= List of volcanic craters in Arizona =

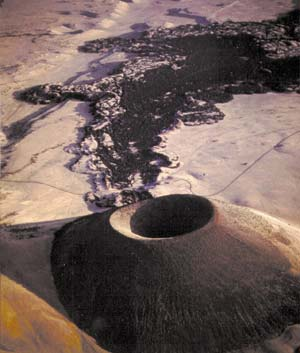
S P Crater

The United States National Geodetic Survey lists 28 volcanic craters in the state of Arizona.

== Coconino County ==
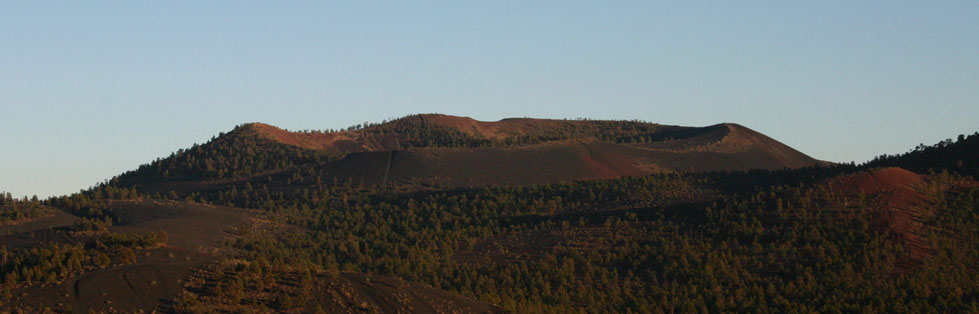
Double Crater

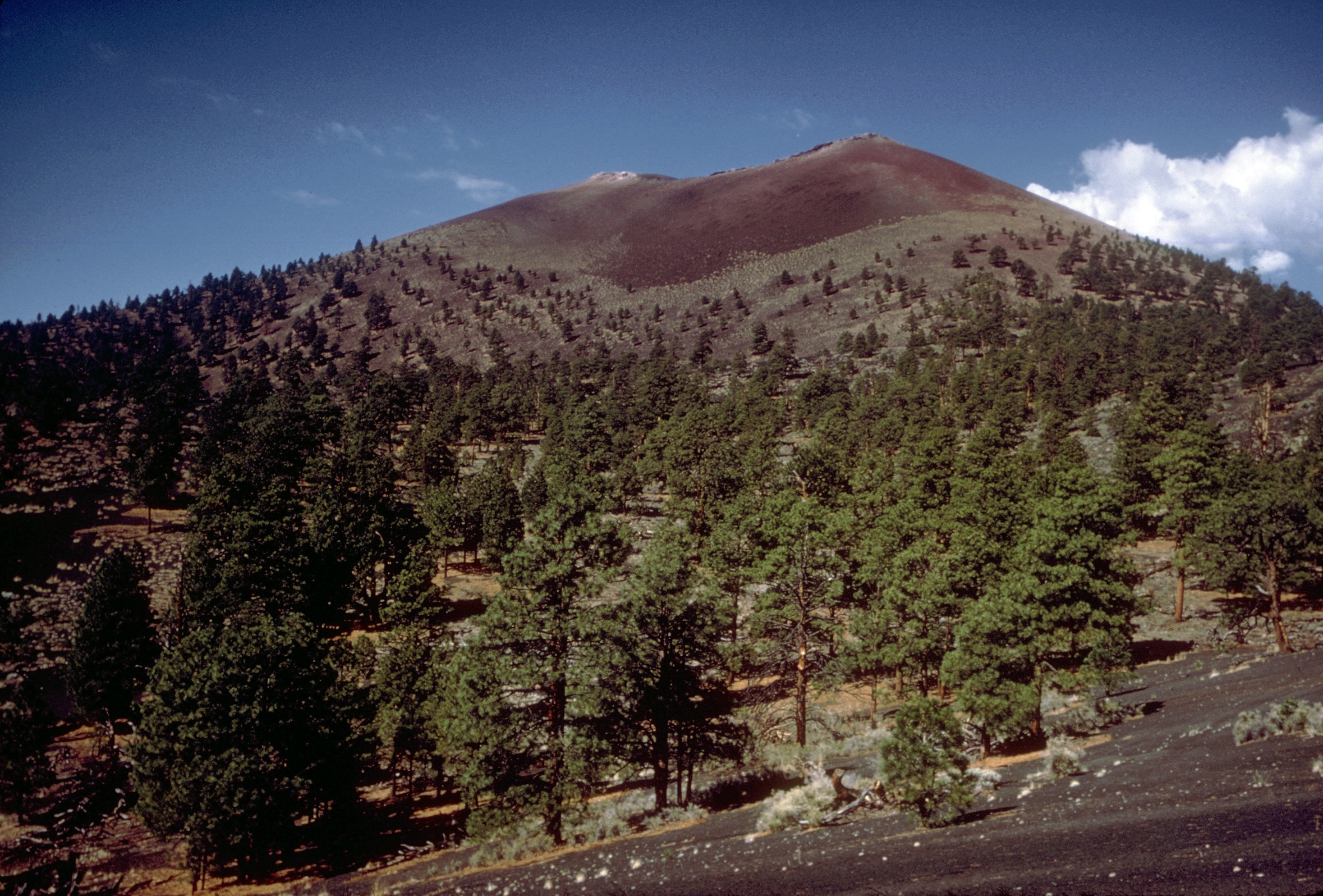
Sunset Crater

- Black Bottom Crater
- Campbell Crater
- Colton Crater
- Double Crater is an extinct Pleistocene volcano within the San Francisco volcanic field, north of Flagstaff.
- Francis Crater
- Haywire Crater
- Junction Crater
- Lenox Crater
- Maroon Crater
- Merriam Crater
- Moon Crater
- North Sheba Crater
- O'Neill Crater
- Old Caves Crater
- Pinnacle Crater
- Rattlesnake Crater
- Robinson Crater was named for Henry H. Robinson, a United States Geological Survey researcher.
- Roden Crater is an extinct volcano crater, and a project of artist James Turrell.
- S P Crater is a cinder cone volcano 25 miles (40 km) north of Flagstaff, Arizona.
- Saddle Crater
- South Sheba Crater
- Stewart Crater
- Strawberry Crater
- Sunset Crater is a cinder cone volcano in the San Francisco volcanic field, and a part of the Sunset Crater National Monument.
- The Sproul

== Cochise County ==
- Paramore Crater

== Greenlee County ==
- Mumphry's Peak

Located just northeast of the town of Clifton, Arizona, this dormant cinder cone volcano and crater is easily visible from the town and In the satellite view of Google Maps. The area is still geologically active, with several hot springs in the area.

== See also ==
- Meteor Crater was created by the impact of a nickel-iron meteorite about 54 yards (49 m) across, around 50,000 years ago.
