= List of lava flows in Arizona =

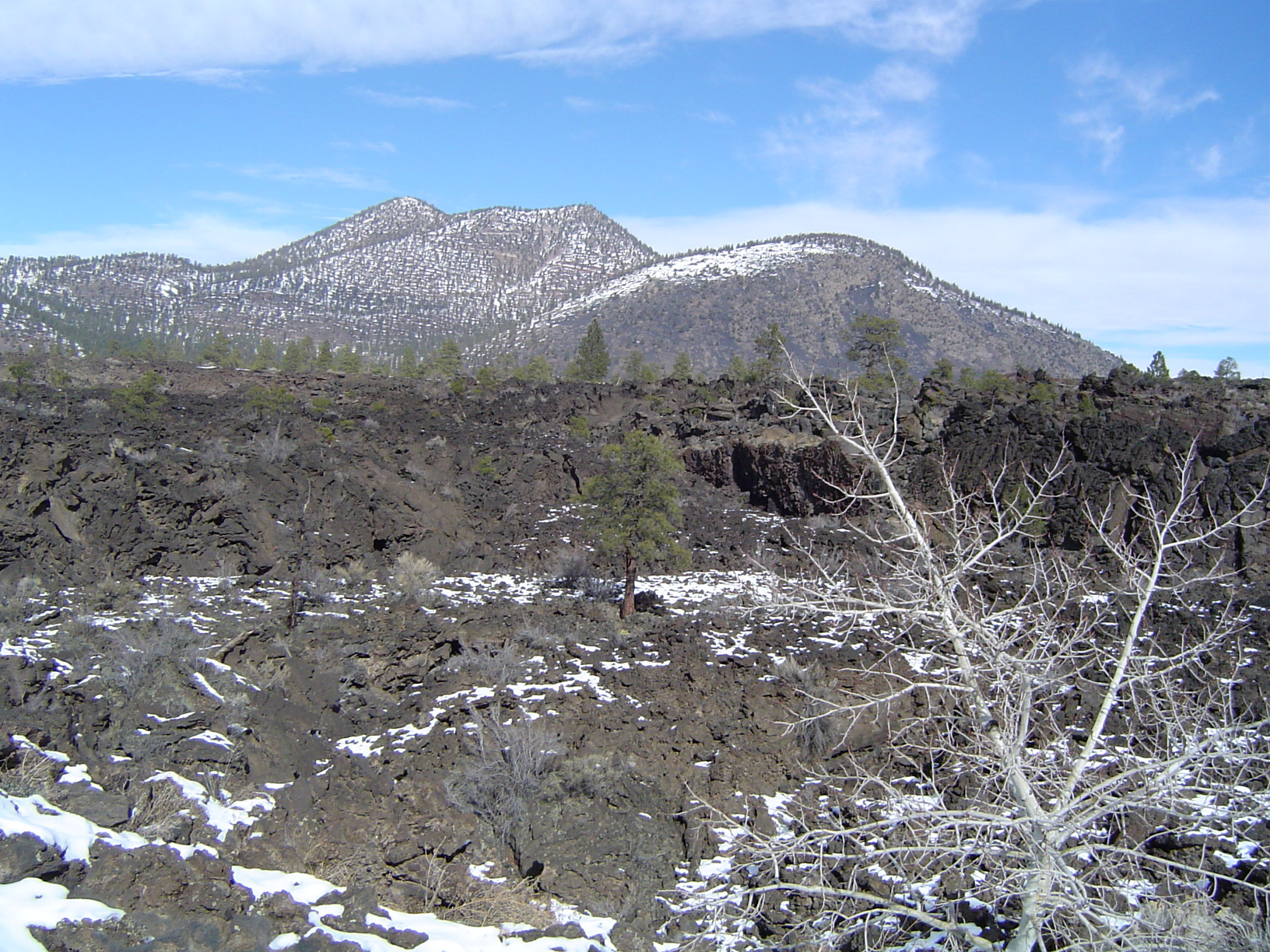
Bonito Lava Flow, with O'Leary Peak and Darton Dome in background.

There are three lava flow areas in the American state of Arizona:

- Bonito Lava Flow - (Map). The basalt lava flow extruded from the base of Sunset Crater around 1180. The flow surface consists of pahoehoe.
- Kana-a Lava Flow - (Map)
- Pinacate Lava Flow - (Map)

== See also ==
- San Francisco Volcanic Field
