= Black Bottom Crater =

Volcanic crater in Coconino County, Arizona

- Location within Arizona

Highest point
- Elevation: 6,332 ft (1,930 m) NGVD 29
- Prominence: 421 ft (128 m)
- Coordinates: 35°23′54″N 111°23′43″W

Geography
- Location: Coconino County, Arizona, U.S.
- Parent range: San Francisco volcanic field
- Topo map: USGS Strawberry Crater

Geology
- Volcanic field: San Francisco volcanic field

Black Bottom Crater is a volcanic crater located in Arizona, east-northeast of Sunset Crater, and west-southwest of Roden Crater. To the northwest is Strawberry Crater. Black Bottom Crater is a cinder cone in the San Francisco volcanic field.
