= Sitgreaves Mountain =

Mountain in Arizona, United States

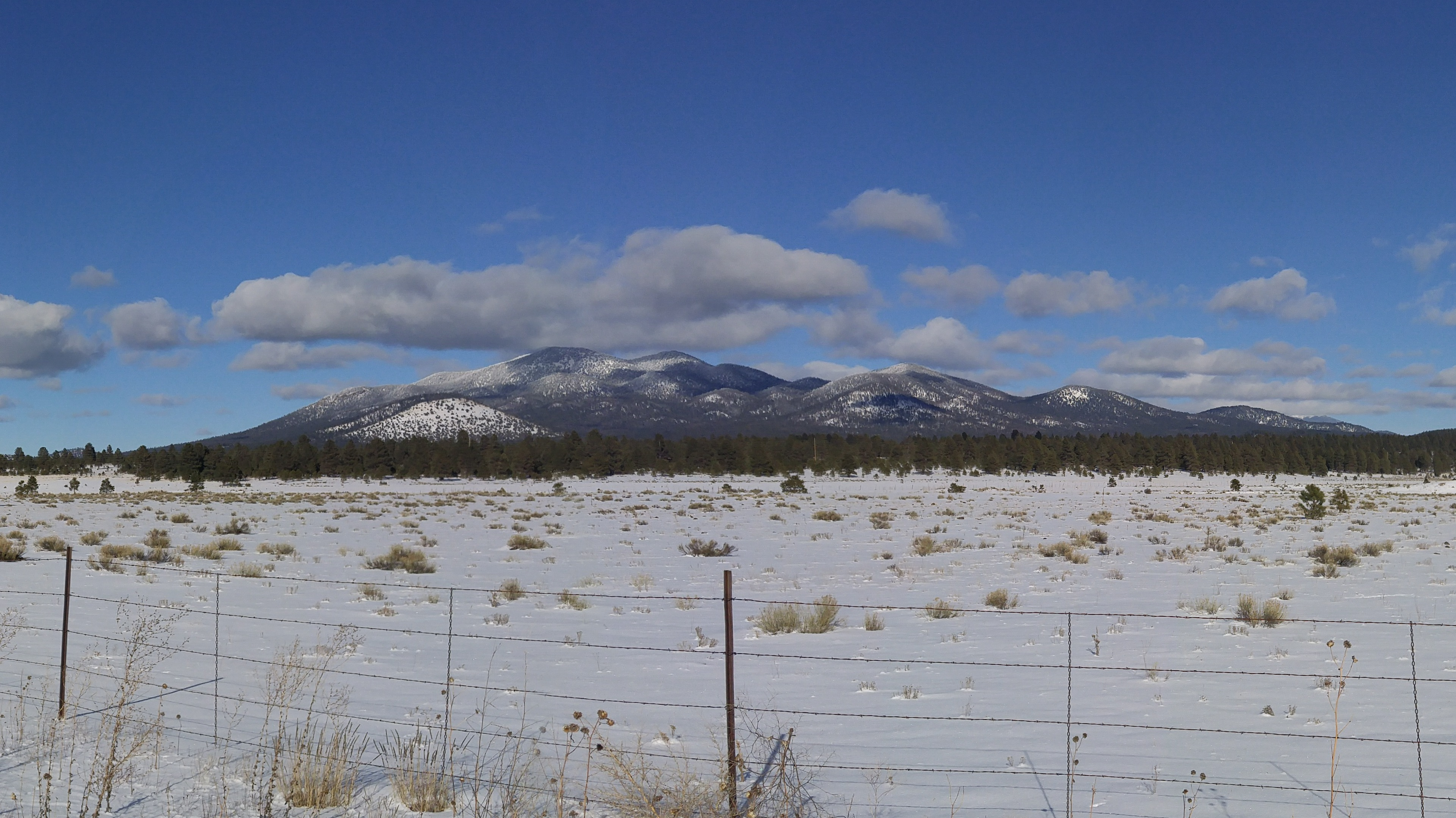
- Sitgreaves Mountain covered in snow

Highest point
- Elevation: 9,388 ft (2,861 m)
- Prominence: 1,949 ft (594 m)
- Coordinates: 35°20′34″N 112°00′22″W

Geography
- Location within Arizona
- Country: United States
- State: Arizona
- County: Coconino County
- Topo map: USGS Mount Sitgreaves

Geology
- Mountain type: Lava domes
- Volcanic arc: San Francisco volcanic field
- Last eruption: 1.9 million years ago

Sitgreaves Mountain is a mountain peak located within Kaibab National Forest in Coconino County, Arizona. It is located between Flagstaff and Williams, Arizona and can be easily seen by drivers along Interstate 40.

Like neighboring Kendrick Peak, this mountain is volcanic in origin, forming a part of the San Francisco Volcanic Field. It is a series of overlapping lava domes, characterized by numerous summits and false peaks. It is located along the same fault line that formed Kendrick Peak and Bill Williams Mountain.
