= Sugarloaf Peak =

Lava dome in Coconino County, Arizona

- Location within Arizona

Highest point
- Elevation: 9,287 ft (2,831 m) NAVD 88
- Prominence: 591 ft (180 m)
- Coordinates: 35°21′48″N 111°36′53″W

Geography
- Location: Coconino County, Arizona, U.S,
- Topo map: USGS Sunset Crater West

Geology
- Mountain type: rhyolite dome
- Volcanic field: San Francisco volcanic field

Sugarloaf is a rhyolite dome located just below the San Francisco Peaks in Flagstaff, Arizona. It formed after a lateral eruption of the mountain, which occurred in a similar fashion to the 1980 eruption of Mount St. Helens.
