= Mount Elden =

Summit in Conconino County, Arizona

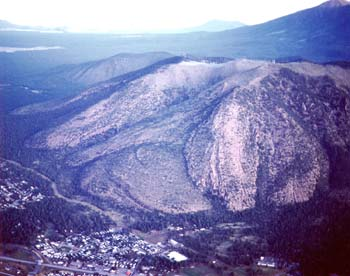
- Mount Elden

Highest point
- Elevation: 9,301 ft (2,835 m) NAVD 88
- Prominence: 1,219 ft (372 m)
- Coordinates: 35°14′28″N 111°35′51″W

Geography
- Location within Arizona
- Location: Coconino County, Arizona, U.S.
- Topo map: USGS Flagstaff East

Geology
- Mountain type: lava dome
- Volcanic field: San Francisco volcanic field
- Last eruption: ~500,000 years ago

Climbing
- Easiest route: road

Mount Elden or Elden Mountain (Hopi: Hovi'itstuyqa) is an extinct lava dome located in central Coconino County northeast of Flagstaff, Arizona. The mountain is named after John Elden, one of the region's earliest Anglo settlers, who established a homestead on its lower slopes and grazed sheep on the open grasslands below during the late 19th century.

Its exposed, rocky slopes are a prominent feature visible from almost any point in Flagstaff, rising steeply by nearly 2,400 feet (730 m) to reach an elevation of 9,301 feet (2,835 m). In 1977, the Radio Fire, a human-caused wildfire, destroyed much of the vegetation on the southern and southeastern slopes, burning 4,600 acres (1,900 hectares).

Despite its rugged appearance, steep relief, and nearly 15 square miles (40 km^{2}) of surface area, Mount Elden is easily accessible via an extensive system of road and non-motorized trail system that is part of the Coconino National Forest.

Mount Elden is one of six hundred volcanoes that dot the San Francisco volcanic field in Northern Arizona. It is currently dormant with the likelihood of eruption in the near future being believed to be extremely remote.

== Geology ==
Mount Elden is one of five large peripheral silicic volcanic features within the greater San Francisco Peaks volcanic system (part of the San Francisco volcanic field) which include the nearby Dry Lake Hills, the Hochderffer and White Horse Hills to the northwest, and O'Leary Peak to the northeast. Because these features developed within close proximity of the San Francisco Mountain strato-volcano there is a strong likelihood that each is a geologic subsidiary of the larger mountain.

Geologically, Mount Elden is a lava dome composed almost entirely of dacitic lava flows which emerged from several vents. These features emerged as intrusive emplacements within sedimentary blocks or as viscous extrusive flows in which the younger flows partially covered the older, lower flows. Geologic evidence suggests that the eruption of the mountain, which occurred at linear vents along regional faults, was a non-explosive event that took place during several flow sequences. Likewise, because of the high viscosity of the dacite, it is likely that the mountain formed in the short period of a few months' time. The mountain's overlapping flows commonly take lobe-like shapes which display a variety of flow characteristics and features including concentric benches, spires, ramping shear fractures, longitudinal tension fractures, and conjugate shear fractures.

Positioned within the central part of Mount Elden, on the mountain's eastern and northwestern flanks, are two sedimentary blocks. Both of these blocks display characteristics of uplift that most likely occurred as dacitic magma intruded into the sedimentary strata at a shallow depth and uplifted the layers, causing them to dip away from the mountain. These blocks of sedimentary material are unique to the mountain, which otherwise is uniformly composed of silicic dacite.

== Contemporary history ==
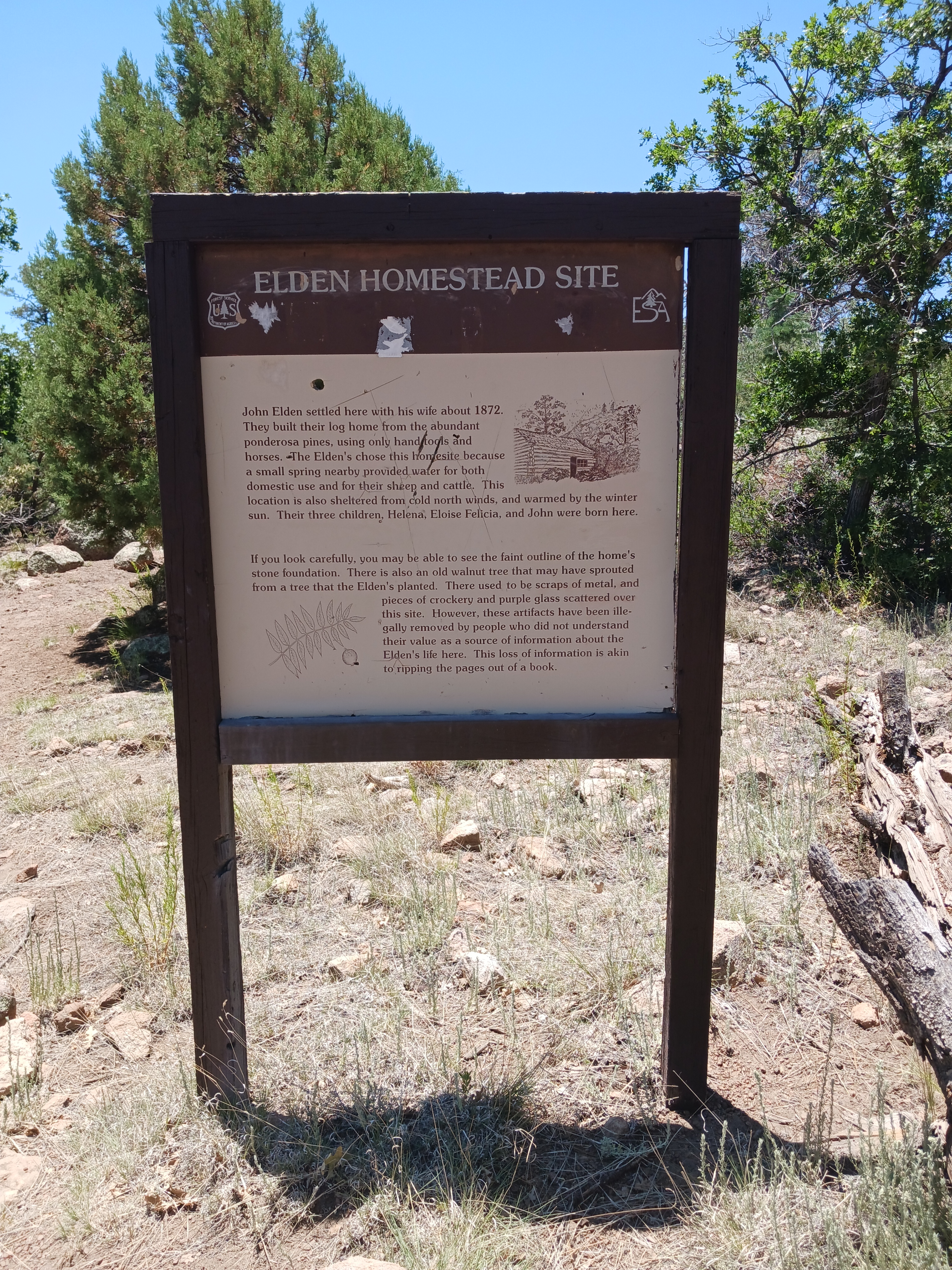
John Elden home-site historical marker at the base of Mount Elden

John Elden, the settler for whom Mount Elden bears its name, settled at the base of what is today Mount Elden in 1877 to raise sheep near a natural spring, now referred to as Elden Springs. The home-site today lies within the Coconino National Forest and bears a National Forest historical marker just north of the City of Flagstaff, Arizona, pictured to the right.

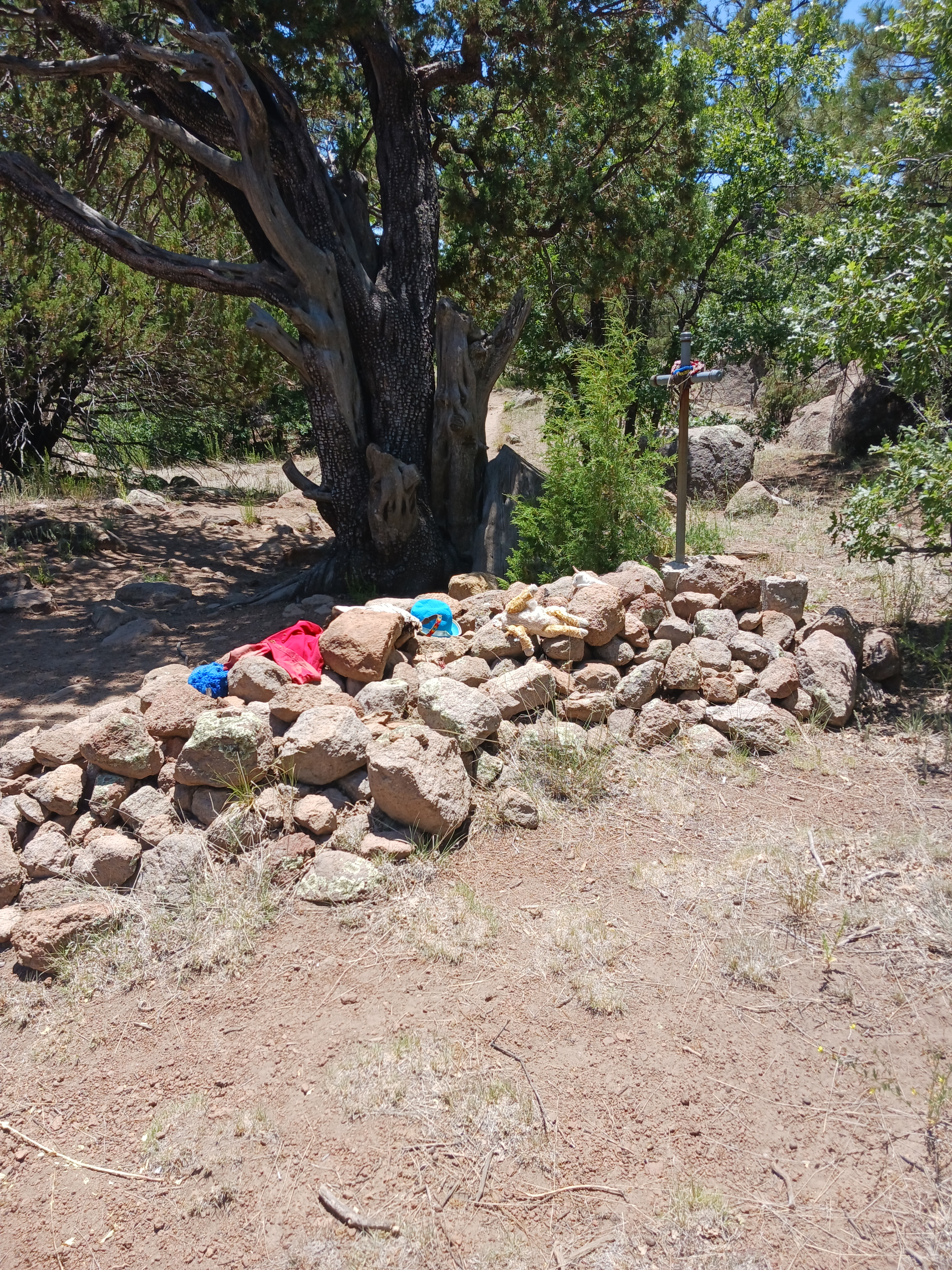
Little John Elden grave site adjacent to the Elden home site.

John Elden earned notoriety when according to legend his six year old son, Little John Elden, was felled by a gunshot, purportedly by a disgruntled stranger named Bob Roberts attempting to water his horse at the spring but was turned away by Mrs. Elden. A citizens posse was formed to track down and catch Roberts, and Roberts was killed shortly afterwards under unknown circumstances. Elden then abandoned the home-site and moved his family to California to start a dairy business. However, none of the legendary story regarding the murder of Little John, the murder of Roberts, or the citizen's posse have any basis in historical fact in that no valid historical records were ever found, although the Little John grave site today remains a historical marker next to the home-site.

== See also ==
- Elden Pueblo
- San Francisco volcanic field
