= Lenox Crater =

Cinder cone in Coconino County, Arizona

Coordinates: 35°21′37″N 111°31′48″W

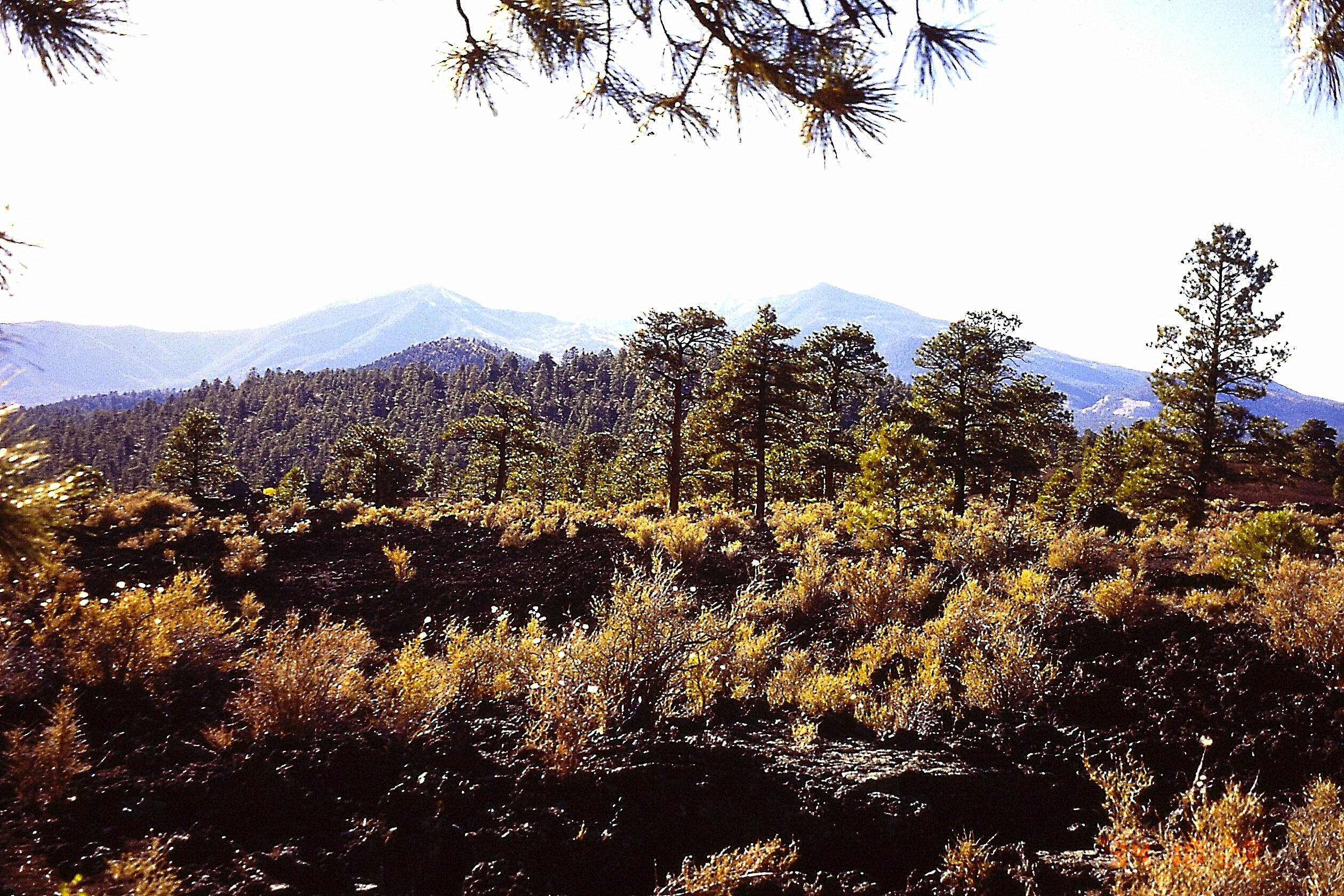
Lenox Crater

Lenox Crater is a cinder cone located in the San Francisco Volcanic Field in Coconino County, near Flagstaff, Arizona, an area known for volcanic activity. The volcano erupted approximately 1,000 years ago, filling a small depression with ash and volcanic cinders. The lava flow from the eruption flowed near the base of Sunset Crater.
