= O'Leary Peak (U.S.) =

Extinct Pleistocene lava dome volcano in Arizona

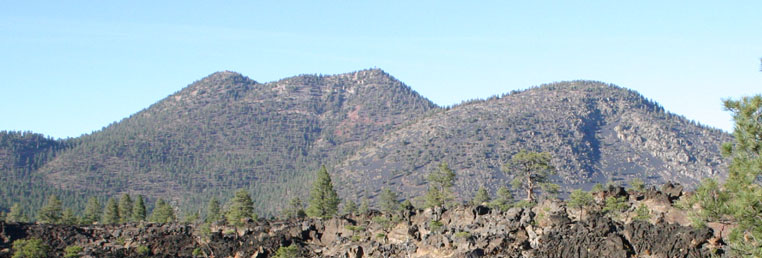
- O'Leary Peak (center) from the Bonito Lava Flow. Darton Dome is at right.

Highest point
- Elevation: 8,919 ft (2,719 m) NAVD 88
- Prominence: 1,778 ft (542 m)
- Coordinates: 35°24′05″N 111°31′35″W

Geography
- Location within Arizona
- Location: Coconino County, Arizona, U.S.
- Topo map: USGS O'Leary Peak

Geology
- Volcanic field: San Francisco volcanic field

O'Leary Peak is an extinct Pleistocene lava dome volcano within the San Francisco volcanic field, north of Flagstaff, Arizona, and to the northwest of Sunset Crater National Monument. A fire lookout tower was built on a subsidiary eastern peak. It has an elevation of 8,919 feet (2,719 m).

== Gallery ==
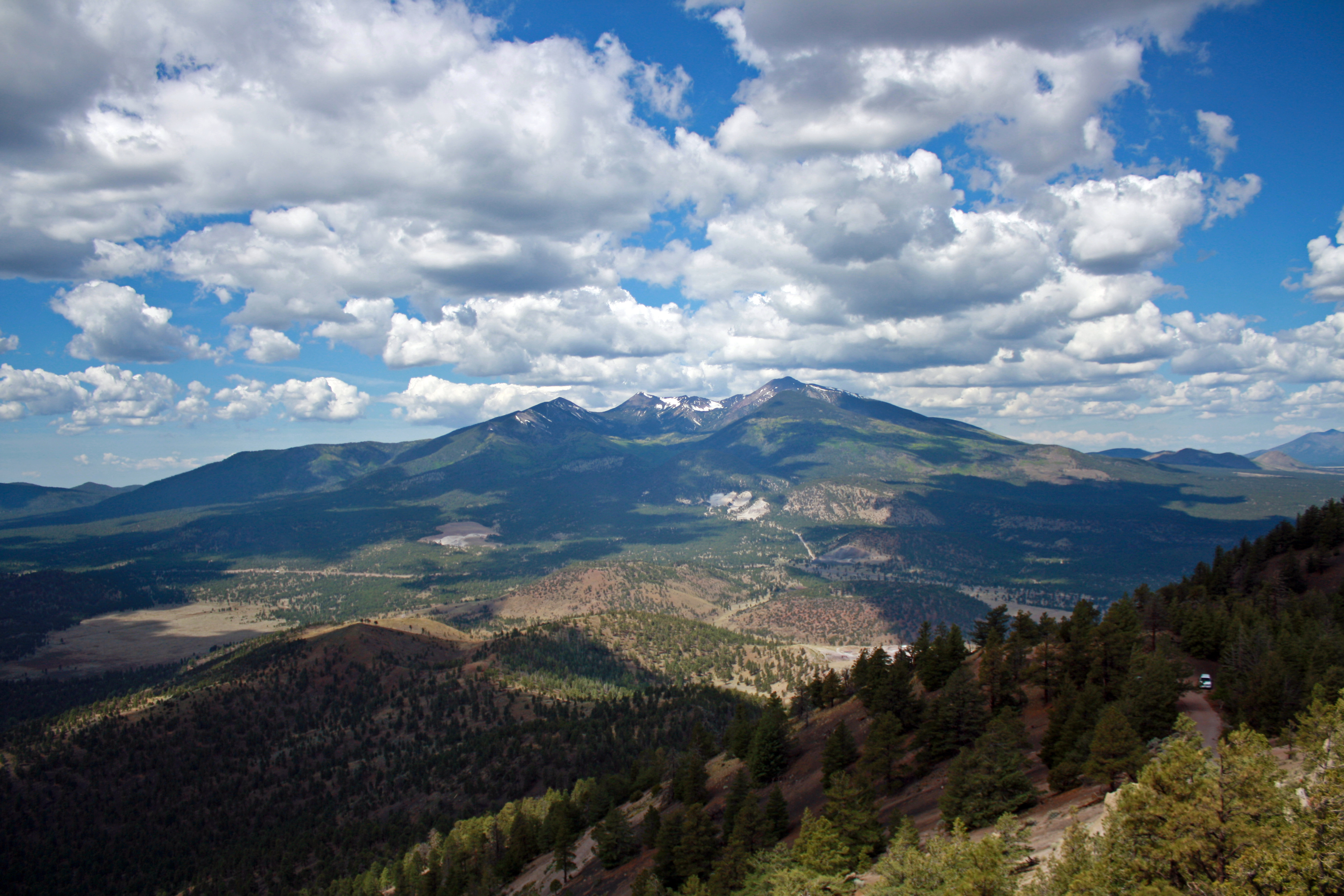
View of the San Francisco Peaks from O'Leary Lookout, 2009

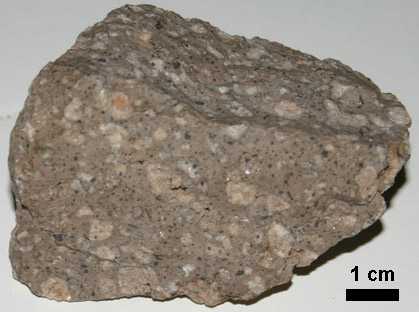
Sample of andesite porphyry from summit of O'Leary peak
