= Humphreys Peak =

Highest mountain in Arizona

- Hopi: Aaloosaktukwi Navajo: Doko'o'osliid
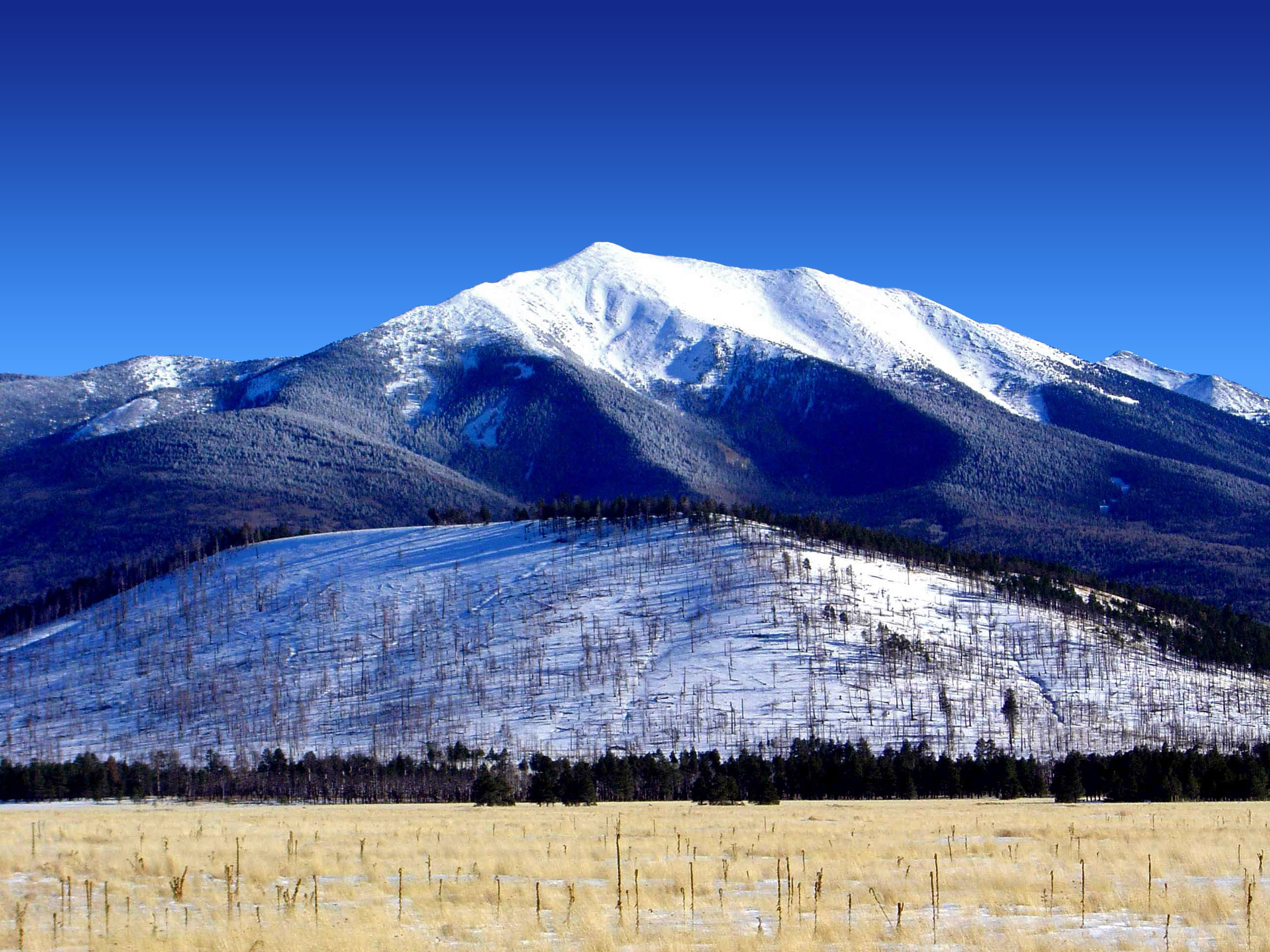
- Humphreys Peak in winter 2004

Highest point
- Elevation: 12,637 ft (3,852 m) NAVD 88
- Prominence: 6,039 ft (1,841 m)
- Isolation: 245.85 miles (395.66 km)
- Listing: North America isolated peaks 48th; U.S. most prominent peaks 64th; U.S. state high point 12th
- Coordinates: 35°20′46.8″N 111°40′40.6″W

Geography
- Location within Arizona
- Location: Coconino County, Arizona, U.S.
- Parent range: San Francisco Peaks
- Topo map: USGS Humphreys Peak

Geology
- Mountain type(s): igneous, volcanic
- Volcanic field: San Francisco volcanic field

Climbing
- Easiest route: Humphreys Trail, class 1

Humphreys Peak (Hopi: Aaloosaktukwi, Navajo: Dookʼoʼoosłííd "its summit never melts") is the highest mountain and the second most prominent peak after Mount Graham in the U.S. state of Arizona. With an elevation of 12,637 feet (3,852 m), (Note: Elevation was recorded as 12,633 feet in a now-superseded survey.) it is located within the Kachina Peaks Wilderness in the Coconino National Forest, about 11 miles (17.7 km) north of Flagstaff, Arizona. Humphreys Peak is the highest of a group of dormant volcanic peaks known as the San Francisco Peaks.

Humphreys Peak was named in about 1870 for General Andrew A. Humphreys, a U.S. Army officer who was a Union general during the American Civil War, and who later became Chief of Engineers of the United States Army Corps of Engineers. However, a United States General Land Office map from 1903 showed the name San Francisco Peak applied to this feature (apparently borrowed from San Francisco Mountain on which the peak stands). Thus the United States Board on Geographic Names approved the variant name in 1911. In 1933, the application of the names was rectified.

== Geology ==
Humphreys Peak is a dormant volcano that rises from the San Francisco Volcanic Field. A gravity induced landslide or blast eruption similar to the 1980 eruptions of Mt St. Helens created the large open-bowl shape on the eastern half of the mountain. Before this collapse, the USGS estimated the volcano could have been 15,000 to 16,000 feet in elevation. During the ice ages of the Pleistocene Epoch, small glaciers carved narrow valleys just below the summit. Much of the mountain is composed of trachyte, a gray volcanic rock.

== Climate ==
The climate at the top of the mountain belongs to the dry-summer subarctic climate (Köppen: Dsc), close to the tundra climate (Köppen: ET), and the climate a little further down the mountainside is Hemiboreal climate (Köppen: Dsb) or warm dry-summer Mediterranean climate (Köppen: Csb). Six months of the year average temperatures below 32 °F (0 °C), and only July averages temperatures above 50 °F (10 °C). No month has a dew point higher than 32 °F (0 °C).

Due to its prominence and isolation, Mt Humphreys is often subject to lightning, especially during the monsoon months in the summer. Additionally, the upper half of the mountain is above the treeline and composed of steep rocks, making hikers more exposed to sudden changes in weather. In 2016, a 17-year-old hiker died and two other teens were injured after being struck by lightning on Humphreys Peak.

Climate data for Humphreys Peak 35.3463 N, 111.6779 W, Elevation: 11,729 ft (3,575 m) (1991–2020 normals)
Month	Jan	Feb	Mar	Apr	May	Jun	Jul	Aug	Sep	Oct	Nov	Dec	Year
Mean daily maximum °F (°C)	32.8 (0.4)	32.6 (0.3)	36.6 (2.6)	42.0 (5.6)	50.1 (10.1)	61.2 (16.2)	64.4 (18.0)	62.1 (16.7)	57.1 (13.9)	48.7 (9.3)	40.2 (4.6)	33.4 (0.8)	46.8 (8.2)
Daily mean °F (°C)	21.6 (−5.8)	20.9 (−6.2)	24.4 (−4.2)	29.0 (−1.7)	36.7 (2.6)	47.0 (8.3)	51.6 (10.9)	50.0 (10.0)	44.6 (7.0)	36.1 (2.3)	28.5 (−1.9)	22.1 (−5.5)	34.4 (1.3)
Mean daily minimum °F (°C)	10.5 (−11.9)	9.2 (−12.7)	12.2 (−11.0)	15.9 (−8.9)	23.4 (−4.8)	32.7 (0.4)	38.8 (3.8)	37.9 (3.3)	32.2 (0.1)	23.6 (−4.7)	16.7 (−8.5)	10.8 (−11.8)	22.0 (−5.6)
Average precipitation inches (mm)	5.20 (132)	5.14 (131)	4.79 (122)	2.60 (66)	1.45 (37)	0.58 (15)	3.64 (92)	5.34 (136)	2.99 (76)	2.90 (74)	3.21 (82)	5.05 (128)	42.89 (1,091)
Average dew point °F (°C)	4.0 (−15.6)	5.5 (−14.7)	6.4 (−14.2)	6.9 (−13.9)	10.6 (−11.9)	11.7 (−11.3)	27.4 (−2.6)	30.9 (−0.6)	26.6 (−3.0)	14.7 (−9.6)	8.5 (−13.1)	4.3 (−15.4)	13.1 (−10.5)
Source: PRISM Climate Group

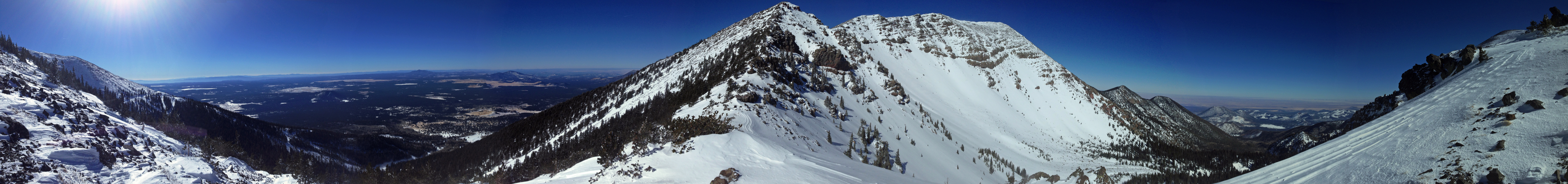
Humphreys Peak right of center from the Humphreys-Agassiz saddle to the south

== Recreation ==
The Arizona Snowbowl ski resort, which operates 8 lifts and 55 ski runs with a total vertical drop of 2,300 ft, is located on the western slope of Mount Humphreys.

Due to its proximity to Flagstaff and the US 180, the trail to the summit is relatively popular. In the summer, when there is no snow, the climb is a strenuous, steep hike with lower oxygen levels at altitude. In the winter, avalanche risk or blizzards is a possible hazard. The trail to the summit is 9 miles (14.5 kilometers) roundtrip with 3400 ft of elevation gain (1 km). The trailhead starts below the tree-line in a dense forest and ends well above the tree-line with unobstructed, 360 degree views, where the Grand Canyon can be seen in the distant north and Flagstaff just to the south.

== See also ==
- List of U.S. states by elevation
- List of Ultras of the United States
- List of mountains and hills of Arizona by height
- San Francisco Peaks
