= Old Caves Crater =

Cinder cone in Coconino County, Arizona

- Cave Hill; Doney Hill; Sheep Hill
- Location within Arizona Location within the United States

Highest point
- Elevation: 7,183 ft (2,189 m)
- Prominence: 423 ft (129 m)
- Coordinates: 35°16′48″N 111°31′38″W

Geography
- Location: Coconino County, Arizona

Old Caves Crater is a cinder cone located in Coconino National Forest, near Flagstaff, Arizona. Its name comes from the numerous small caves on the slopes of the cinder cone. A forest of new growth ponderosa pines cover the lower slopes of the cone, while a pinyon-juniper forest covers the upper slopes. A trail leads to the top of Old Caves Crater, providing views of the San Francisco Peaks and the surrounding area. In the 14th century, Native Americans built a settlement adjacent to the crater.
