= Double Crater =

Extinct Pleistocene volcano in Coconino County, Arizona

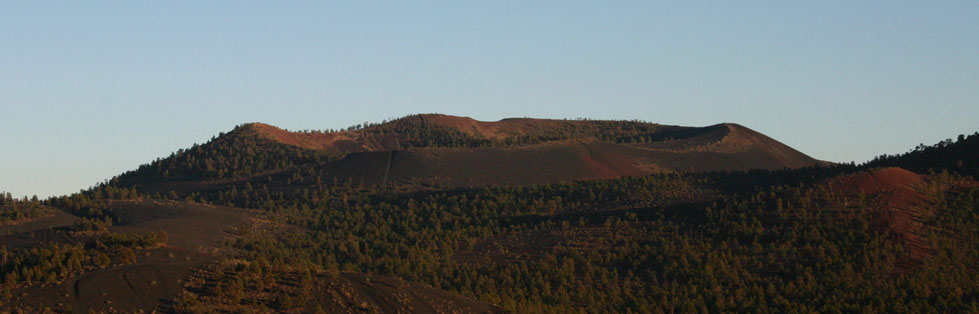
- Double Crater, facing southeast.

Highest point
- Elevation: 8,007 ft (2,441 m)
- Prominence: 944 ft (288 m)
- Coordinates: 35°20′34″N 111°26′52″W

Geography
- Location within Arizona
- Location: Coconino County, Arizona, U.S.
- Topo map: USGS Sunset Crater East

Geology
- Volcanic field: San Francisco volcanic field

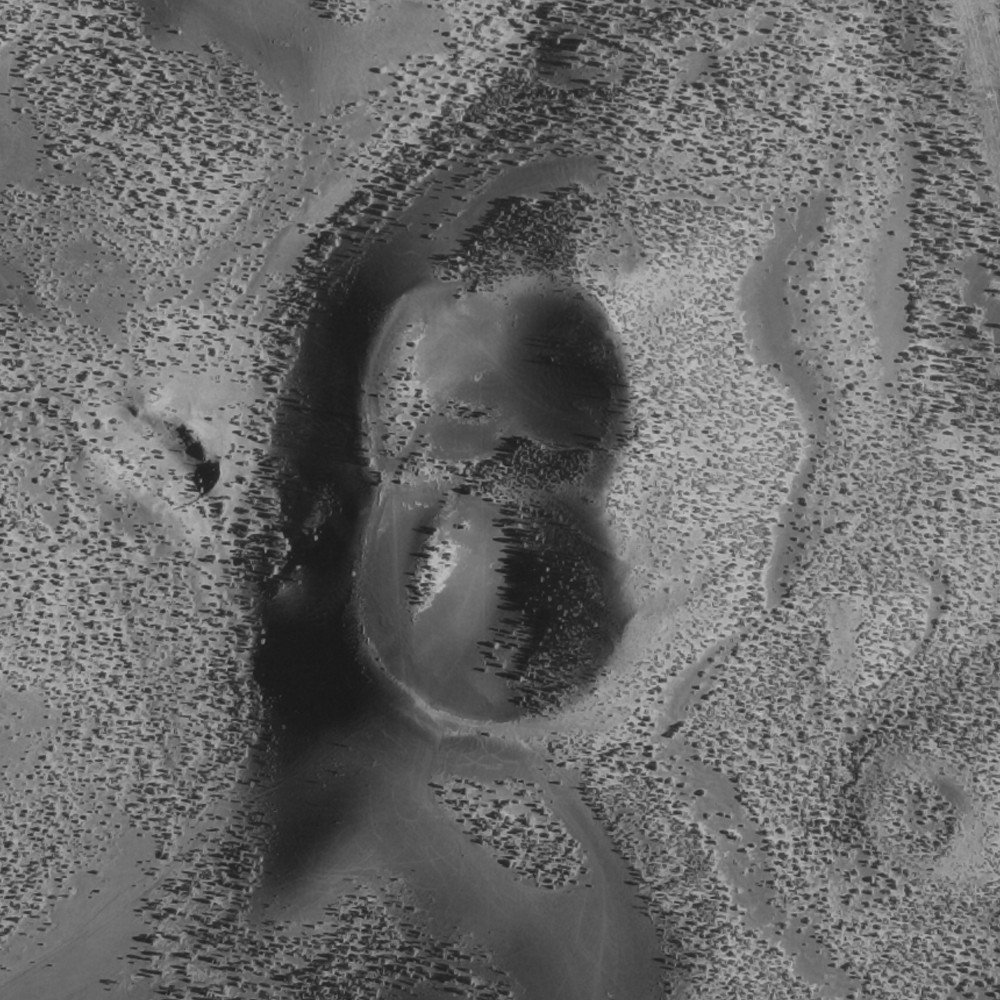
Double Crater, Arizona

Double Crater is an extinct Pleistocene volcano within the San Francisco volcanic field, north of Flagstaff, Arizona. It is to the southeast of Sunset Crater.
