= Bill Williams Mountain =

Summit in Coconino County, Arizona, US

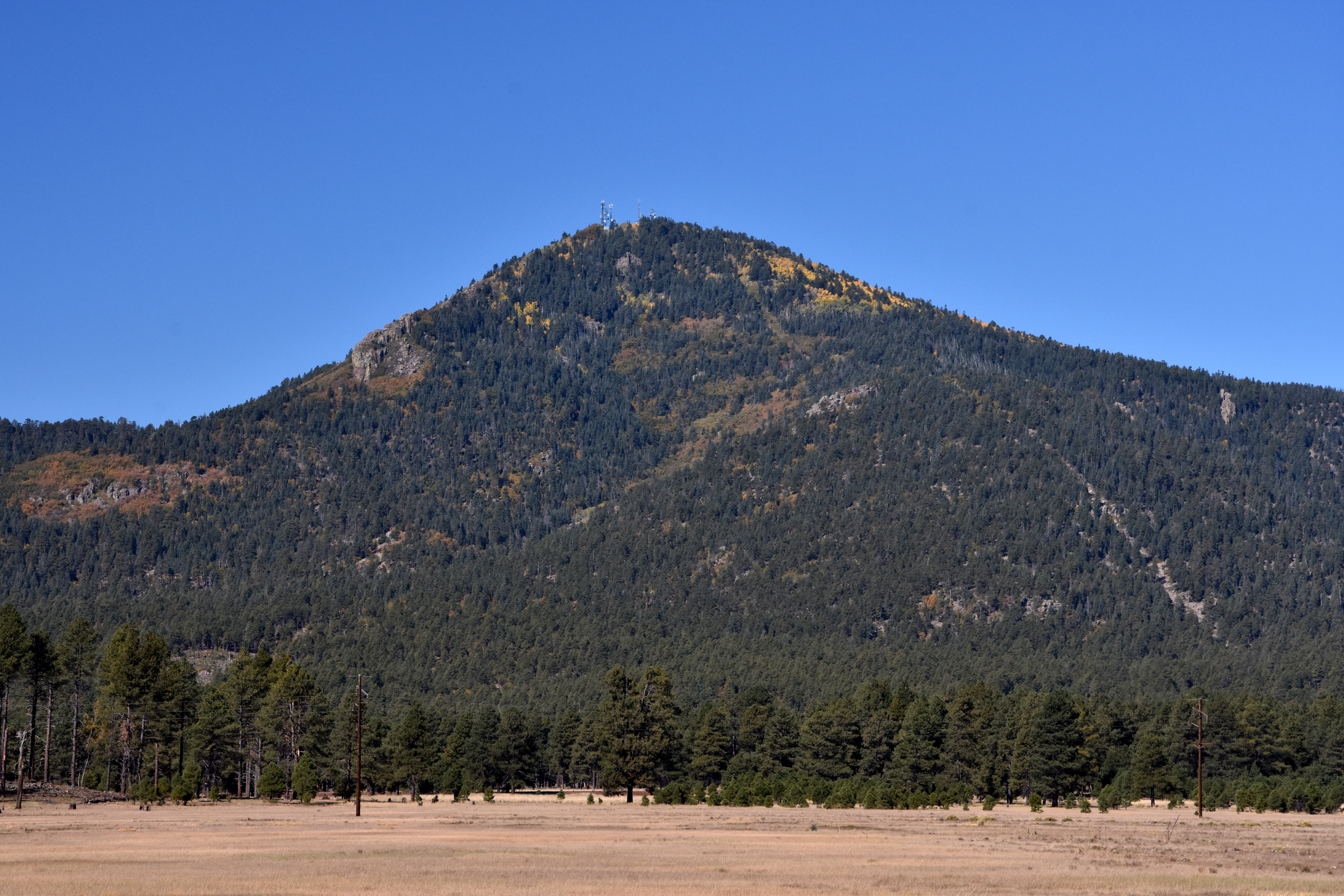
- East aspect

Highest point
- Elevation: 9,259 ft (2,822 m) NAVD 88
- Prominence: 2,296 ft (700 m)
- Coordinates: 35°12′00″N 112°12′19″W

Geography
- Location within Arizona Location within the United States
- Location: Coconino County, Arizona, US
- Topo map: USGS Williams South

Geology
- Mountain type: Lava dome
- Volcanic field: San Francisco volcanic field
- Last eruption: 2.8 million years ago

Climbing
- Easiest route: Road and short hike

Bill Williams Mountain is a peak and lava dome volcano located about 31 miles (50 km) west of Flagstaff and 3.5 miles (5.6 km) south of Williams, Arizona in the Kaibab National Forest. It is named for Old Bill Williams, a scout, guide, and mountain man, who lived in the 1800s. It is part of the San Francisco volcanic field.

== Gallery ==
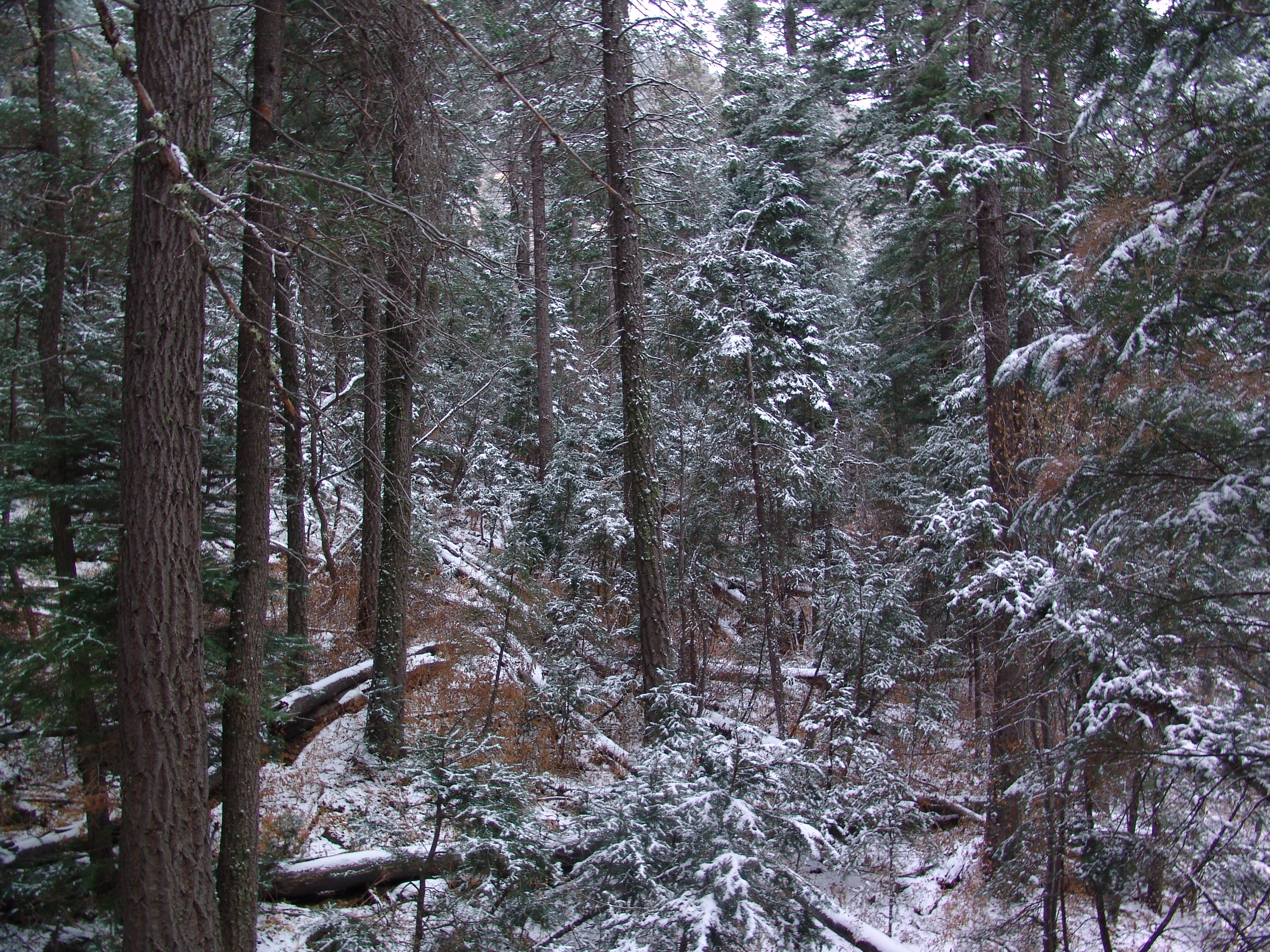

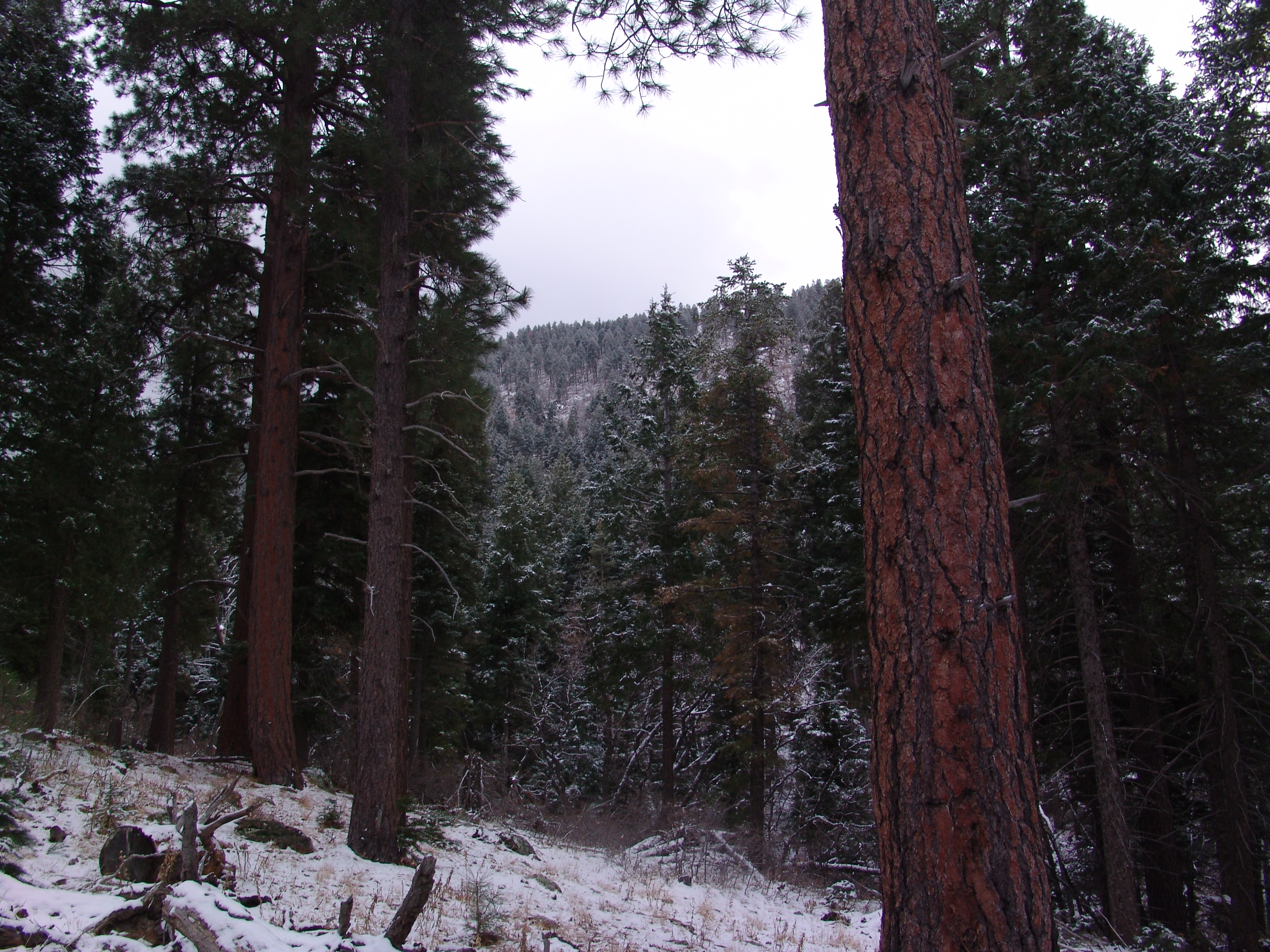

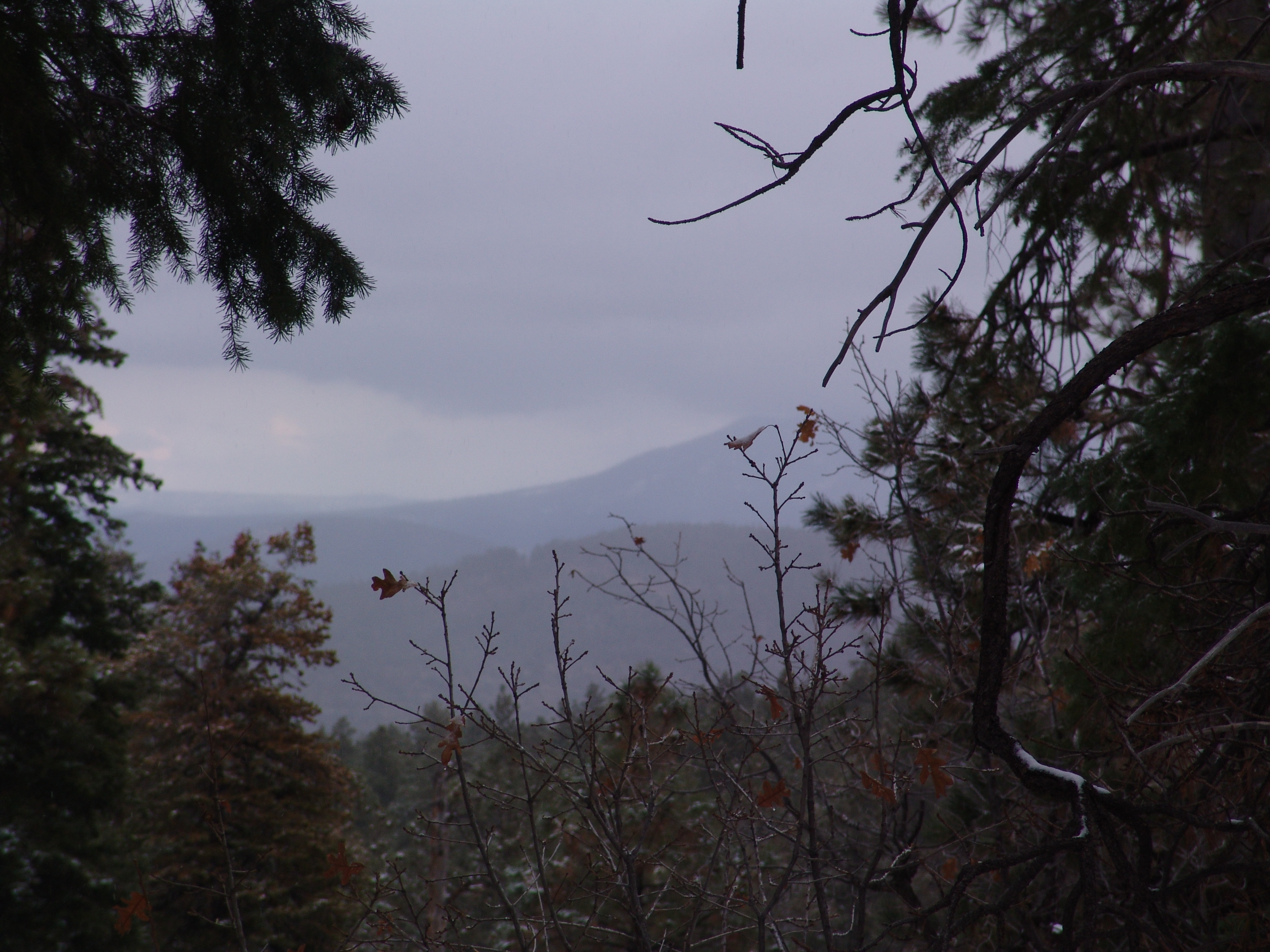

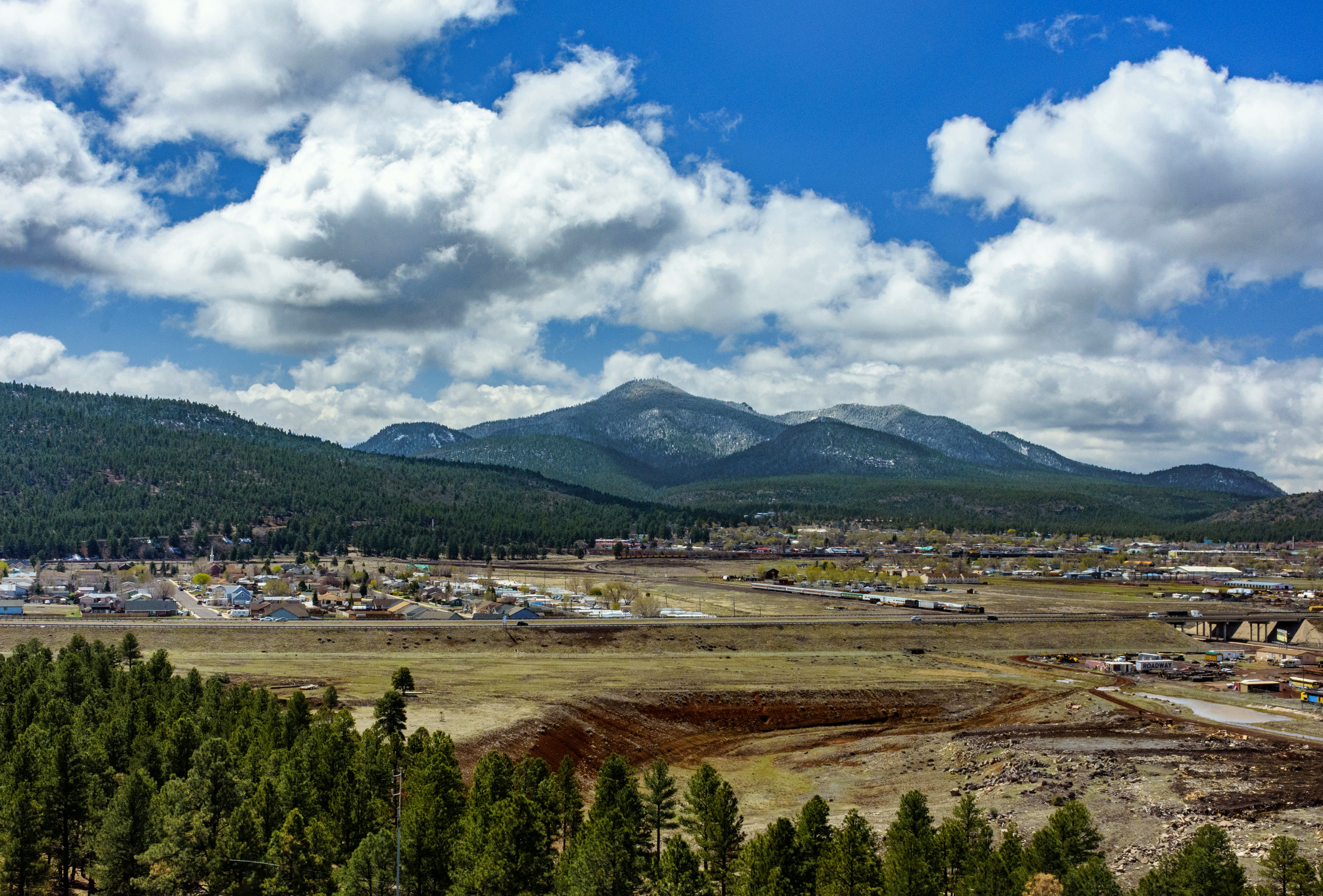
