= S P Crater =

Cinder cone volcano in Arizona, United States

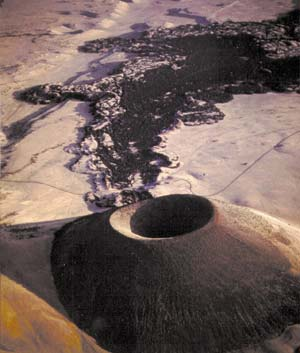

Highest point
- Elevation: 7,021 ft (2,140 m) NGVD 29
- Coordinates: 35°34′56″N 111°37′55″W

Geography
- Location within Arizona
- Location: Coconino County, Arizona, U.S.

Geology
- Rock age: ~6.0–5.5 ka
- Mountain type: Cinder cone
- Volcanic field: San Francisco volcanic field

S P Crater is a cinder cone volcano in the San Francisco volcanic field, 25 miles (40 km) north of Flagstaff, Arizona, United States. It is surrounded by several other cinder cones which are older and more eroded. It is a striking feature on the local landscape, with a well-defined lava flow that extends for 4.3 miles (7 km) to the north. American astronauts have used the crater to train for moonwalking.

== Name ==
The naming of the mountain is a bit of lore from the Old West. S P Crater can be climbed, and the lava flow can be viewed from the crater rim. C. J. Babbitt, an 1880s rancher and early landowner of the mountain, expressed his opinion that the mountain resembled a spilled chamber pot (or Shit Pot, "SP"), and locally this became the accepted name. When viewed from certain angles on the ground, the combination of the smooth round shape of the cone, the dark lava spatter on the rim, and the long dark lava flow extruding from the base may resemble human waste. Mapmakers refused to spell out the full name, and the mountain has been shown on maps and other literature with the abbreviated name.

== Geology ==
S P Crater is an 820-foot (250 m) high cinder cone of basaltic andesite. The cone is capped by an agglomerate rim that helps to protect its structure. A lava flow extends to the north of the cone for about 7 km (4.3 mi) and originated from the same vent. Some scientists consider the lava flow to have slightly predated the cinder cone because of geochemical data that suggests the flow is more silica rich than the cinders and based on the observation that the cone overlaps the lava flow and shows no sign of deformation. However, there is some debate about the relationship between the cone and flow as it is not uncommon to form cinder cones during the early phase of an eruption as a magma degasses, and then to have lava push through the side of a cone during a late phase of eruption.

K–Ar dates on the lava are about 70 ka, but are considered unreliable because of excess argon and the un-weathered young appearance of the cone. More recent optically stimulated luminescence age dating on single-grain quartz xenocrysts from basalt flows at S P Crater has yielded more reliable ages of 6.25±0.86 ka and 5.46±0.70 ka for the older flow, and 5.51±0.60 ka for the younger flow, together suggesting a generalized date of ~6.0–5.5 ka that is more concordant with its youthful geomorphic character.
