= Strawberry Crater =

Cinder cone volcano in Coconino County, Arizona, US

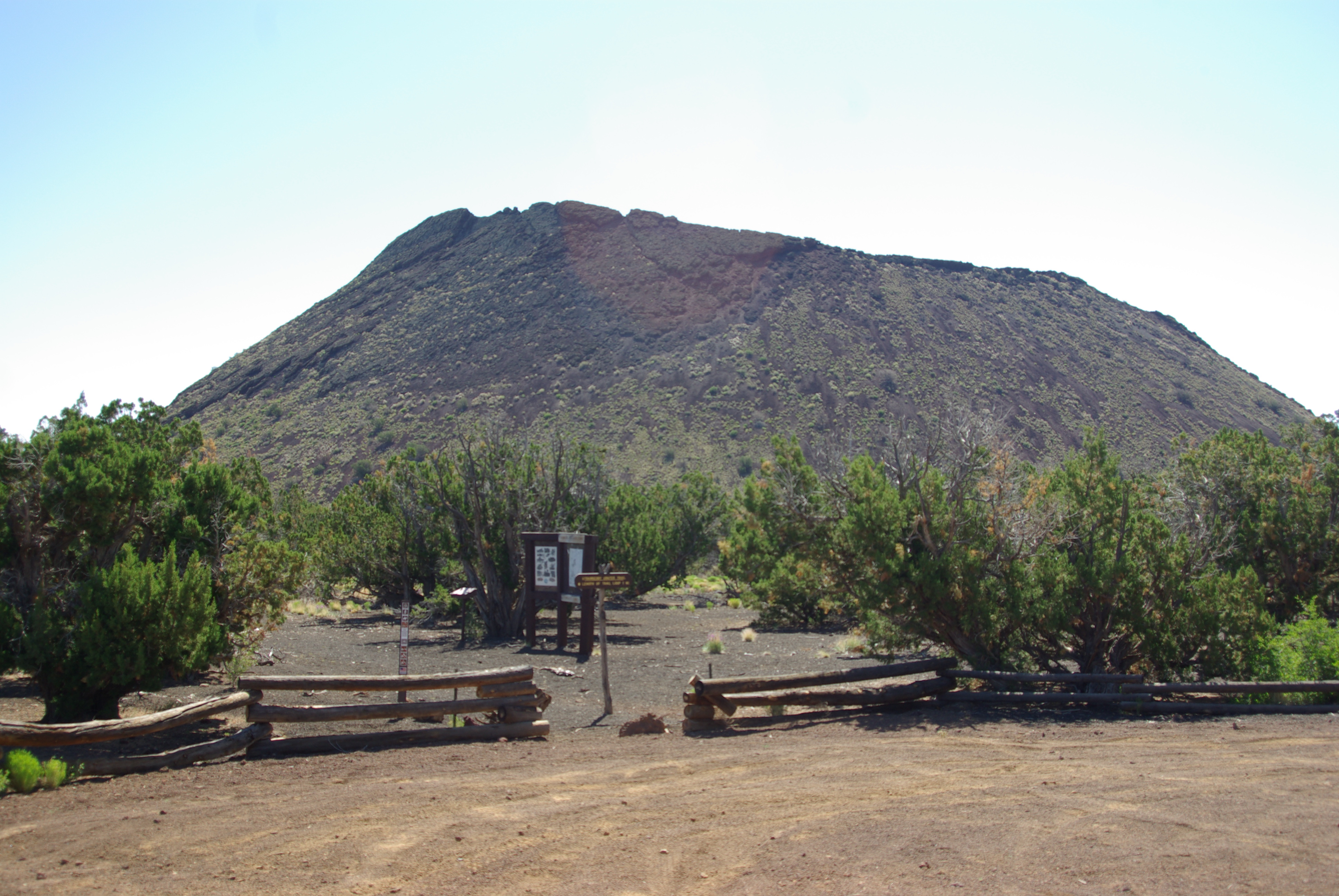

Highest point
- Elevation: 6,526 ft (1,989 m) NGVD 29
- Prominence: 476 ft (145 m)
- Coordinates: 35°26′32″N 111°28′13″W

Geography
- Location within Arizona
- Location: Coconino County, Arizona, U.S.
- Topo map: USGS Strawberry Crater

Geology
- Mountain type: cinder cone
- Volcanic field: San Francisco volcanic field

Climbing
- Easiest route: Trail hike

Strawberry Crater Wilderness
- IUCN category Ib (wilderness area)
- Location within the United States
- Location: Coconino County, Arizona, U.S.
- Nearest city: Flagstaff
- Coordinates: 35°25′49″N 111°25′49″W
- Area: 10,141 acres (4,104 ha)
- Established: 1984
- Administrator: Coconino National Forest; U.S. Forest Service

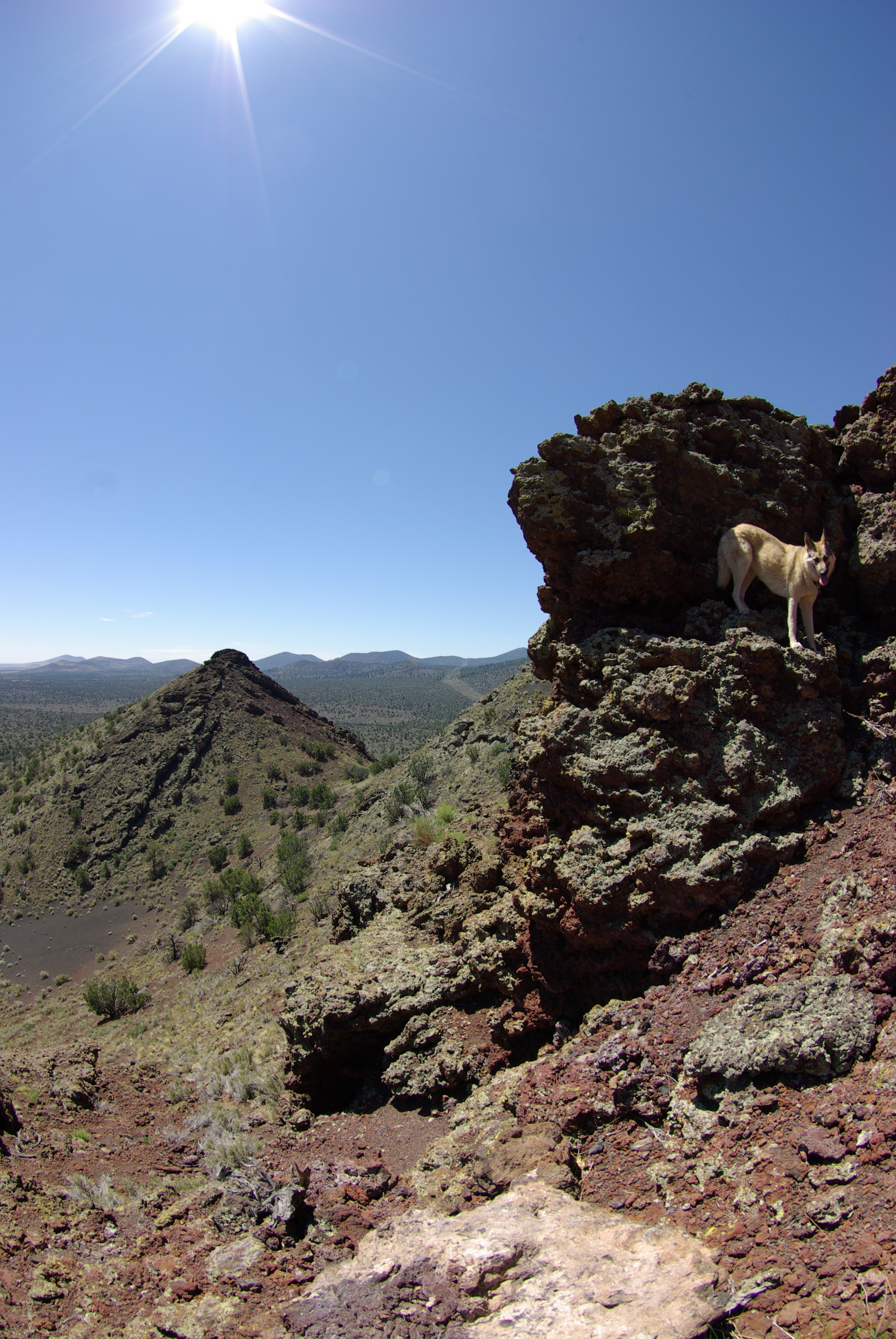
Near the summit

Strawberry Crater is a cinder cone volcano, more than 1,000 feet (300 m) high, in the San Francisco volcanic field, 20 miles (32 km) north of Flagstaff, Arizona. It is along Forest Road 545 between the Wupatki National Monument and Sunset Crater National Monument in the Strawberry Crater Wilderness. The crater lies in a volcanic field at a base elevation of about 5,500 feet (1,700 m), and prominence heights of about 6,526 feet (1,989 m). The northwestern end of the crater is covered with lava flows, while the southern end is filled with low cinder cones. Several of the surrounding cones include the better known, taller and younger Sunset Crater in the adjacent Sunset Crater National Monument.

The wilderness area that includes Strawberry Crater covers 10,743 acres (4,348 ha), consisting mainly of hills, cinder cones, and arid terrain ranging in elevation from 5,500 to 6,000 feet (1,700 to 1,800 m). The surface landforms are about 50,000 to 100,000 years old.

== Name ==
The cone shape and the reddish cinders that created the cone resemble a giant strawberry.

== Geology ==
Experts say that Strawberry Crater is relatively young compared to other craters in the United States. It was formed from volcanic eruptions around 800 and 1604 BCE. There were several volcanic periods, during which multi-colored rocks were deposited on Earth's surface. Nine-hundred-year-old Sinagua ruins in the vicinity include evidence of gardens that used volcanic cinders as a water-retaining mulch. There are many different paths leading to the crater, but there is only one trail that is marked. Surrounding the crater, there are rolling cinder-strewn hills with a variety of different plants from pinons to junipers.

From the top of the cinder cones there are views of the Kachina Peaks Wilderness, the Hopi Buttes, the Painted Desert, and the valley of the Little Colorado River. The geologic forms and twisted junipers make Strawberry Crater Wilderness a popular place for photography.

== Climate ==
Hiking and recreation at Strawberry Crater is open year-round. Winters near the crater average to around 50 degrees, while summers tend to be very hot and dry. There are very few natural water sources near the hiking trail, so travelers are advised to bring a sufficient amount of water.

== Archaeology ==
Around the actual crater, there are low walls of stacked rock. These walls are said to be Native American constructions. There are also remnants of ancient gardens where inhabitants used volcanic cinders for water-retaining mulch.

== Recreation ==
Strawberry Crater offers a variety of recreational activities such as day hiking and horseback riding. Information about these activities can be found on the Coconino National Forest recreational website.

== See also ==
- List of Arizona Wilderness Areas
- List of U.S. Wilderness Areas
- Wilderness Act
