= San Francisco volcanic field =

Volcano in Arizona, United States

San Francisco volcano field
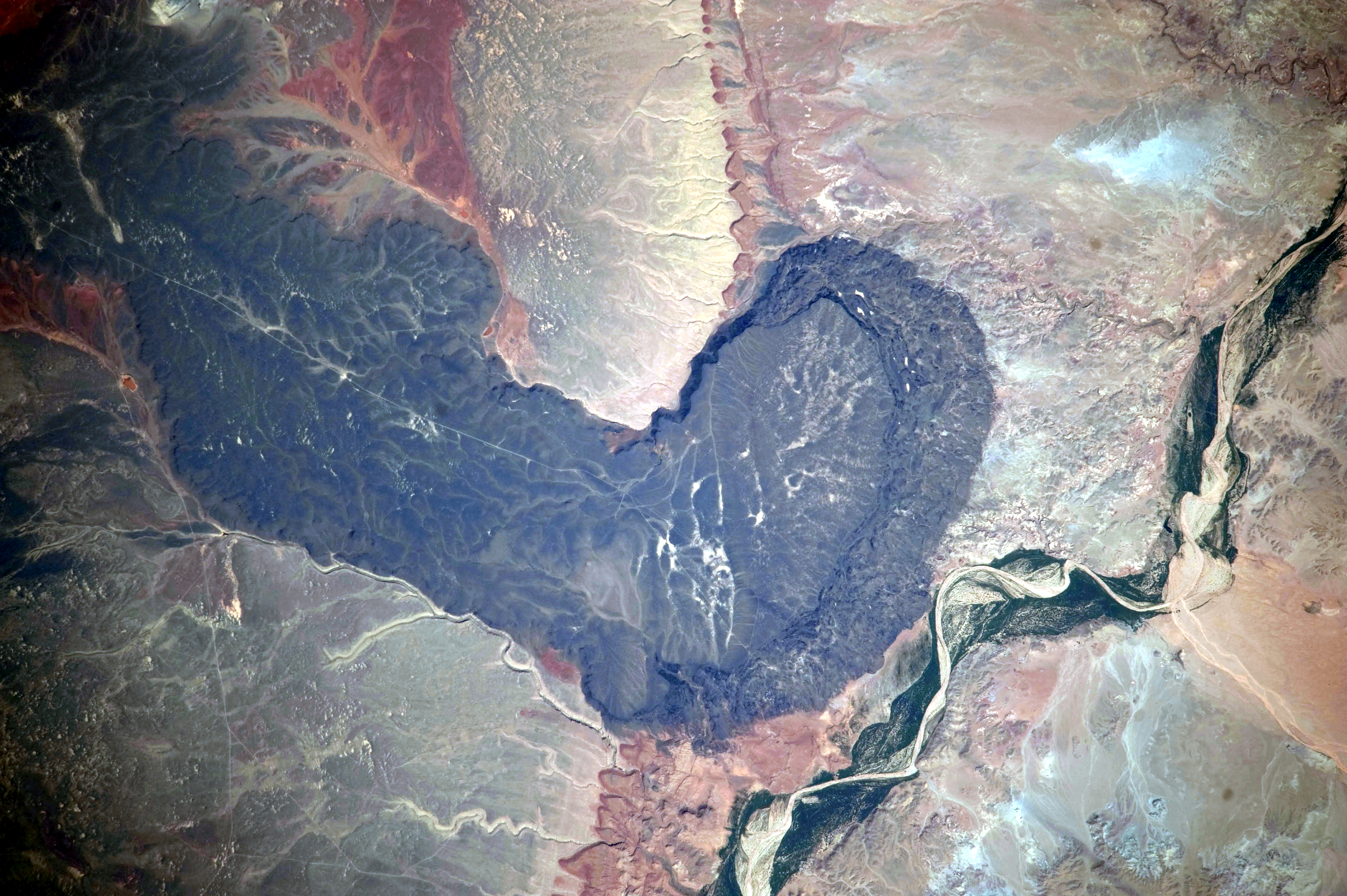
- Satellite image of Black Point lava flow

Highest point
- Peak: Humphreys Peak
- Coordinates: 35.347°N 111.678°W

Dimensions
- Length: 50 miles (80 km)
- Area: 5,000 square kilometres (1,900 mi^{2})

Geography
- Location: just north of Flagstaff, Arizona
- Country: United States
- Region: Arizona

Geology
- Rock age: ~6 Ma
- Mountain type: Volcano field
- Rock types: Basalt; Picro-Basalt; Trachyandesite; Basaltic TrachyandesiteTrachyte; Trachydacite; Dacite; Rhyolite

The San Francisco volcanic field is an area of volcanoes in northern Arizona, north of Flagstaff, US. The field covers 1,800 square miles (4,700 km^{2}) of the southern boundary of the Colorado Plateau. The field contains over 600 volcanoes ranging in age from nearly 6 million years old to less than 1,000 years (Miocene to Holocene), of which Sunset Crater is the youngest. The highest peak in the field is Humphreys Peak, at Flagstaff's northern perimeter: the peak is Arizona's highest at 12,633 feet (3,851.5 m) and is a part of the San Francisco Peaks, an active stratovolcano complex.

== Description ==
The first volcanoes in the San Francisco Volcanic Field began to erupt about 6 million years ago, in an area where the town of Williams, Arizona is now. Subsequently, a several-mile-wide belt of successively younger eruptions migrated eastward, to the area of modern Flagstaff, Arizona, and beyond toward the valley of the Little Colorado River. Today, this belt of volcanoes extends about 50 miles (80 km) from west to east.

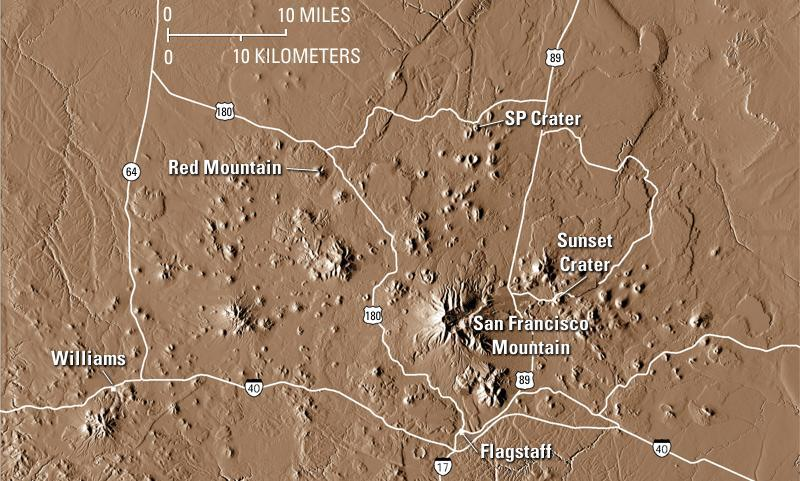
USGS Digital elevation model of the San Francisco volcanic field

Most volcanoes are located near boundaries of the Earth's tectonic plates, but Arizona is well within the interior of the North American Plate. Some geologists suggest that there is a site of localized melting fixed deep within the Earth’s mantle beneath northern Arizona. As the North American Plate moves slowly westward over a stationary source of magma, eruptions produce volcanoes that are strung out progressively eastward. By looking at seismic waves and studying elements and isotopes within rocks from the region, scientists now believe that the layers of molten material in the mantle circulate beneath the Colorado Plateau. Warm material from the asthenosphere is able to invade the lithosphere. The influx of hotter asthenospheric material below the crust provides the heat necessary for volcanism.

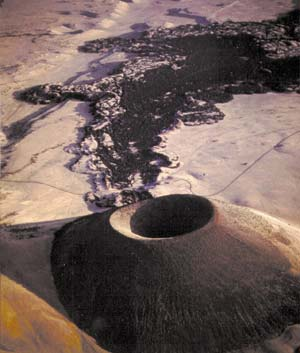
SP Crater is a cinder cone with a basalt lava flow that extends for 4.3 miles (6.9 km)

Most of the more than 600 volcanoes in the San Francisco Volcanic Field are monogenetic basalt cinder cones. The cinder cones are relatively small, usually less than 1,000 ft (300 m) tall, and formed within months to years. They are built when gas-charged frothy blobs of basalt magma are erupted as a lava fountain. During flight, these lava blobs cool and fall back to the ground as dark volcanic rock containing cavities created by trapped gas bubbles. If small, these fragments of rock are called “cinders” and, if larger, “bombs.” As the fragments accumulate, they build a cone-shaped hill. Once sufficient gas pressure has been released from the supply of magma, lava oozes quietly out to form a lava flow. This lava typically squeezes out from the base of the cone and tends to flow away for a substantial distance because of its low viscosity. SP Crater, 25 mi (40 km) north of Flagstaff, is an excellent example of a cinder cone, and its associated lava flow extends for 4.3 mi (6.9 km) to the north of the cone. Several zones of concentrated eruptive activity have been identified – the more silicic volcanic centers appear to have begun with basaltic activity and then evolved to more silicic compositions.

San Francisco Mountain is the only stratovolcano in the San Francisco Volcanic Field. Stratovolcanoes have moderately steep slopes and form by the accumulation of layer upon layer of andesite lava flows, cinders, and ash, interspersed with deposits from volcanic mudflows at lower elevations. San Francisco Mountain was built by eruptions between about 1 and 0.4 million years ago. Since then, much of the mountain has been removed to create the “Inner Basin.” The missing material may have been removed quickly and explosively by an eruption similar to the 1980 eruption of Mount St. Helens, Washington, or it may have been removed slowly and incrementally by a combination of large landslides, water erosion, and glacial scouring.

The San Francisco Volcanic Field also includes several lava domes, formed by highly-viscous dacite and rhyolite magmas. These magmas are so viscous that they tend to pile up and form very steep-sided bulbous domes at the site of eruption. Domes can be active for decades or sometimes centuries. Mount Elden, at the eastern outskirts of Flagstaff, is an excellent example of an exogenous dacite dome and consists of several overlapping lobes of lava. Sugarloaf Peak, at the entrance to San Francisco Mountain’s Inner Basin, is a rhyolite lava dome.

== Future ==
Although there has been no eruption for nearly 1,000 years, it is likely that eruptions will occur again in the San Francisco Volcanic Field. With an average interval of several thousand years between past periods of volcanic activity, it is impossible to forecast when the next eruption will occur. USGS scientists believe that the most probable sites of future eruptions are in the eastern part of the field and that the eruptions are likely to be small. These future eruptions may provide spectacular volcanic displays but should pose little hazard because of their small size and the relative remoteness of the area.

== Visitation and usage ==
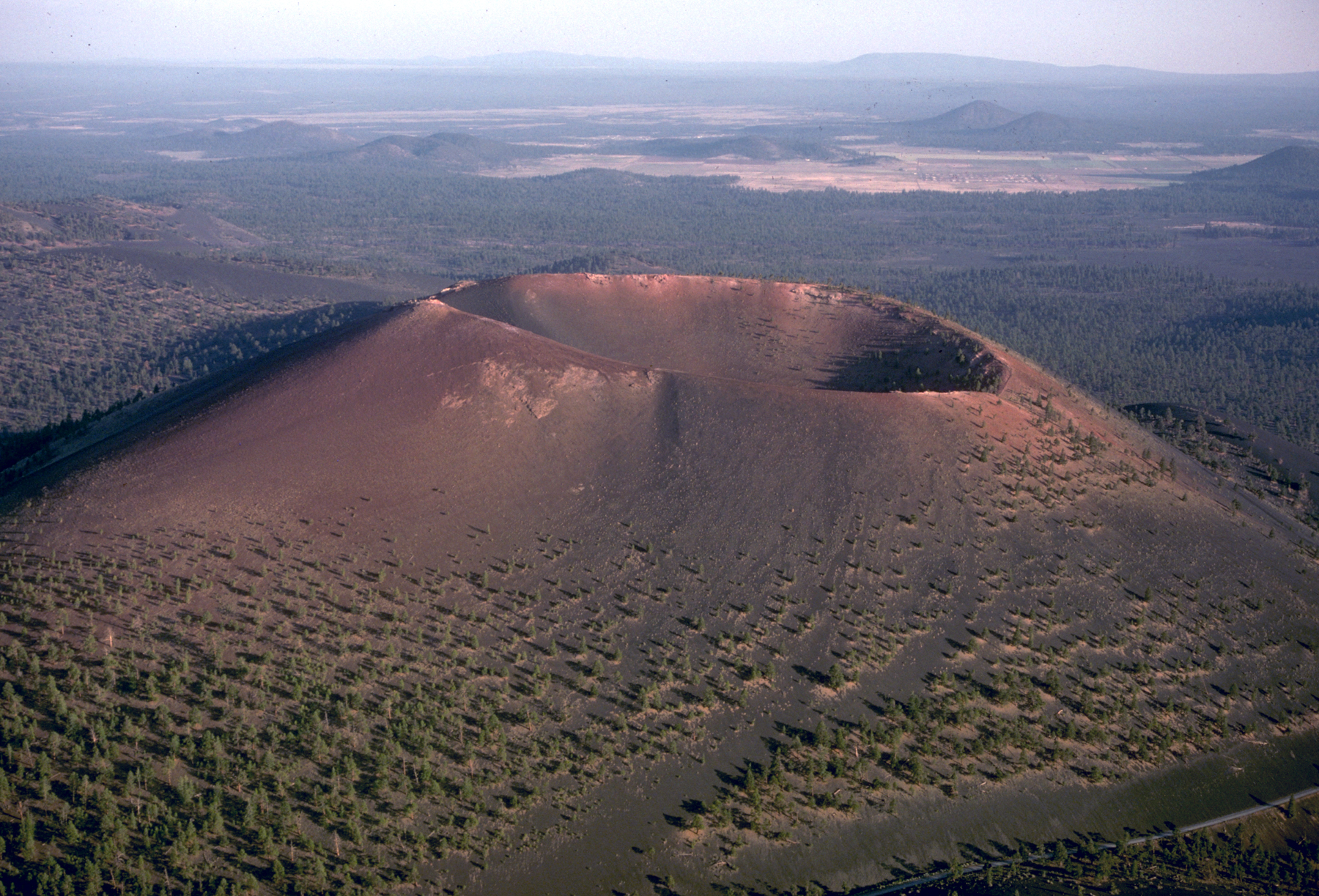
Aerial view of Sunset Crater, 2005

Popular tourist and hiking destinations in the volcanic field include the Kendrick Mountain Wilderness, 20 miles northwest of Flagstaff; and Sunset Crater. Sunset Crater has a hiking trail along an ʻaʻā lava flow to its base.

Areas of the volcanic field have been used by NASA for testing techniques for exploration in a simulated extraterrestrial terrain environment. NASA has also conducted the Desert Research and Technology Studies (DRATS) tests here.

== Notable vents ==
Name	Elevation		Location	Last eruption
Name	meters	feet	Coordinates	Last eruption
Antelope Hill	2,136	7,008	35°33′03″N 111°41′01″W	~650,000 years ago
Bill Williams Mountain	2,822	9,259	35°12′00″N 112°12′19″W	2.8 million years ago
Colton Crater (Crater 160)	2,070	6,791	35°32′42″N 111°38′10″W	-
Double Crater	2,441	8,007	35°20′44″N 111°27′05″W	unknown
Mount Elden	2,835	9,301	35°20′47″N 111°40′40″W	~500,000 years ago
Kendrick Peak	3,178	10,425	35°24′29″N 111°51′03″W	1.4 million years ago
Merriam Crater	2,077	6,813	35°20′19″N 111°17′11″W	20,000 years ago
O'Leary Peak	2,719	8,919	35°24′05″N 111°31′36″W	Pleistocene
San Francisco Peaks	3,851	12,633	35°20′47″N 111°40′40″W	~400,000 years ago
Sitgreaves Mountain	2,861	9,388	35°20′34″N 112°00′22″W	1.9 million years ago
SP Crater (SP Mountain)	2,140	7,021	35°34′56″N 111°37′55″W	5,500 years ago
Strawberry Crater	1,989	6,526	35°26′38″N 111°28′40″W	~50,000 years ago
Sunset Crater	2,451	8,042	35°21′51″N 111°30′11″W	950 ± 40 years
Sugarloaf Peak	2,831	9,287	35°26′38″N 111°28′40″W	~80,000 years ago

== See also ==
- List of volcanoes in the United States
- List of volcanic fields
- Roden Crater
