= San Francisco Peaks =

Mountain range in Arizona, United States

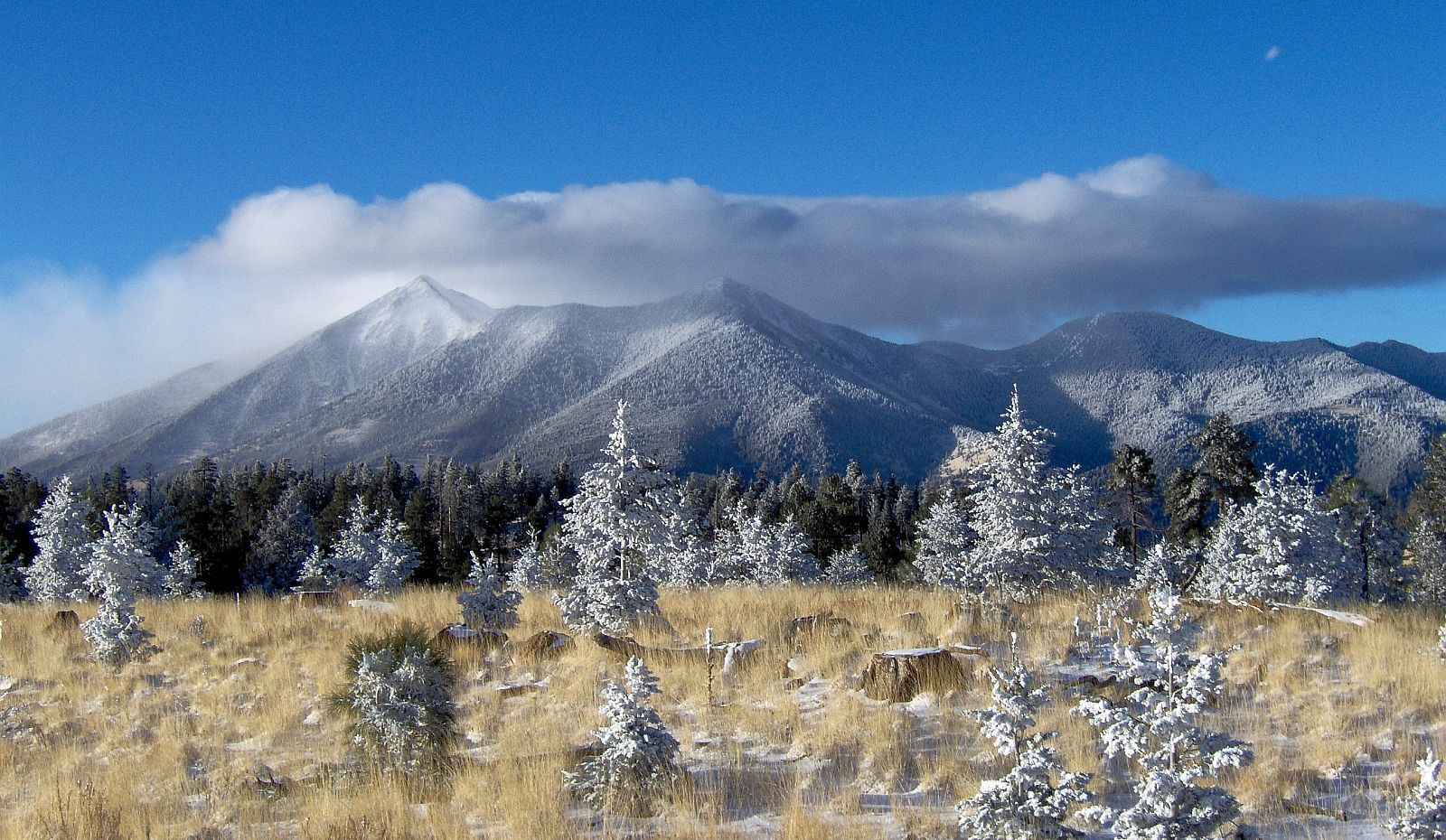
- The San Francisco Peaks viewed from nearby Mount Elden

Highest point
- Peak: Humphreys Peak
- Elevation: 12,633 ft (3,851 m) NAVD 88
- Coordinates: 35°20′47″N 111°40′41″W

Naming
- Native name: Dookʼoʼoosłííd (Navajo); Nuva'tukya’ovi (Hopi); Wi:munakwa (Yavapai)

Geography
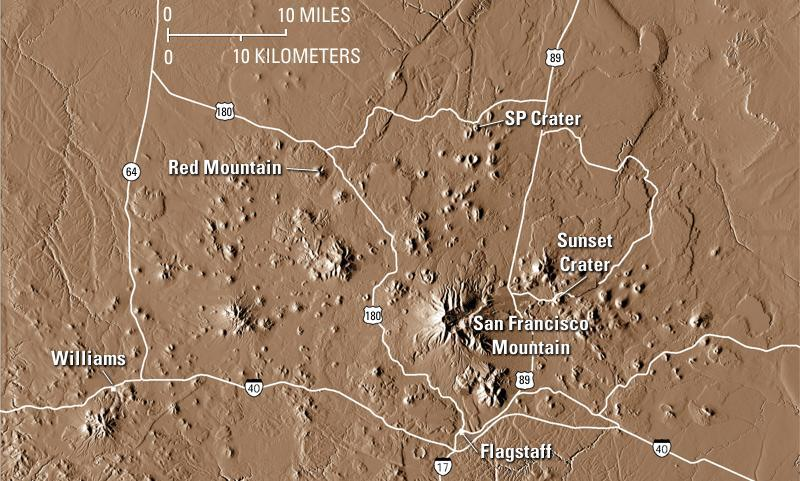
- Map of San Francisco Peaks and surrounding volcanic field
- Country: United States
- State: Arizona
- Range coordinates: 35°20′N 111°40′W

Geology
- Rock age(s): Between 1 Million and 93,000 Years Ago
- Mountain type: Stratovolcano
- Rock type: Igneous
- Volcanic field: San Francisco volcanic field
- Last eruption: ~400,000 years ago

The San Francisco Peaks (Navajo: Dookʼoʼoosłííd, Spanish: Sierra de San Francisco, Hopi: Nuva'tukya'ovi, Western Apache: Dził Tso, Keres: Tsii Bina, Southern Paiute: Nuvaxatuh, Havasupai-Hualapai: Hvehasahpatch/Huassapatch/Wik'hanbaja, Yavapai: Wi:mun Kwa, Zuni: Sunha K'hbchu Yalanne, Mojave: 'Amat 'Iikwe Nyava) are a volcanic mountain range in north central Arizona, just north of Flagstaff. Part of the San Francisco volcanic field, the Peaks are the remnant of the former San Francisco Mountain, a prehistorically larger single stratovolcano. The highest summit in the range, Humphreys Peak, is the highest point in the state of Arizona at 12,633 feet (3,851 m) in elevation. An aquifer within the caldera supplies much of Flagstaff's water while the mountain itself is in the Coconino National Forest, a popular recreation site. The Arizona Snowbowl ski area is on the western slopes of Humphreys Peak, and has been the subject of major controversy involving several tribes and environmental groups.

== Geography ==
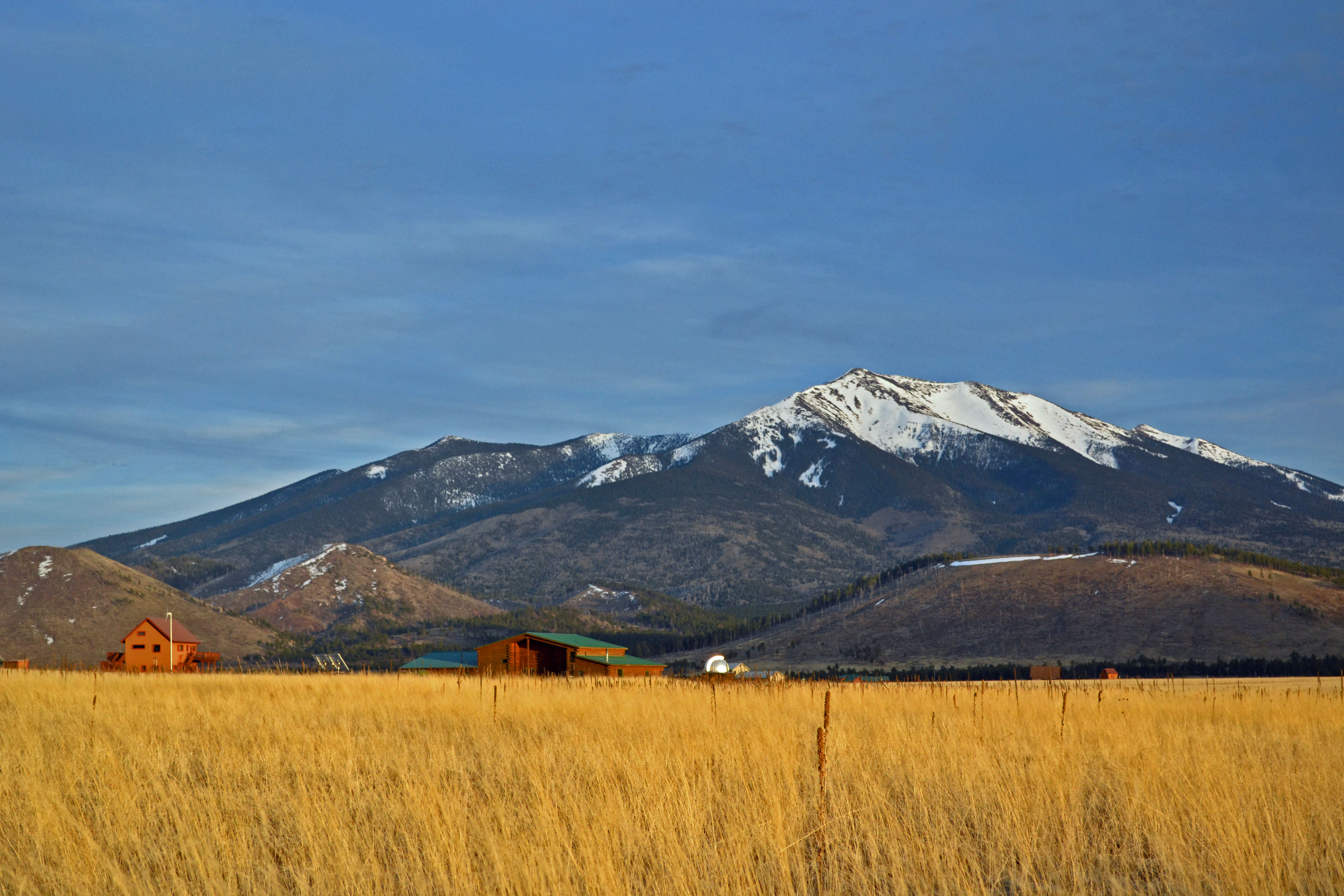
The San Francisco Peaks, Spring 2015

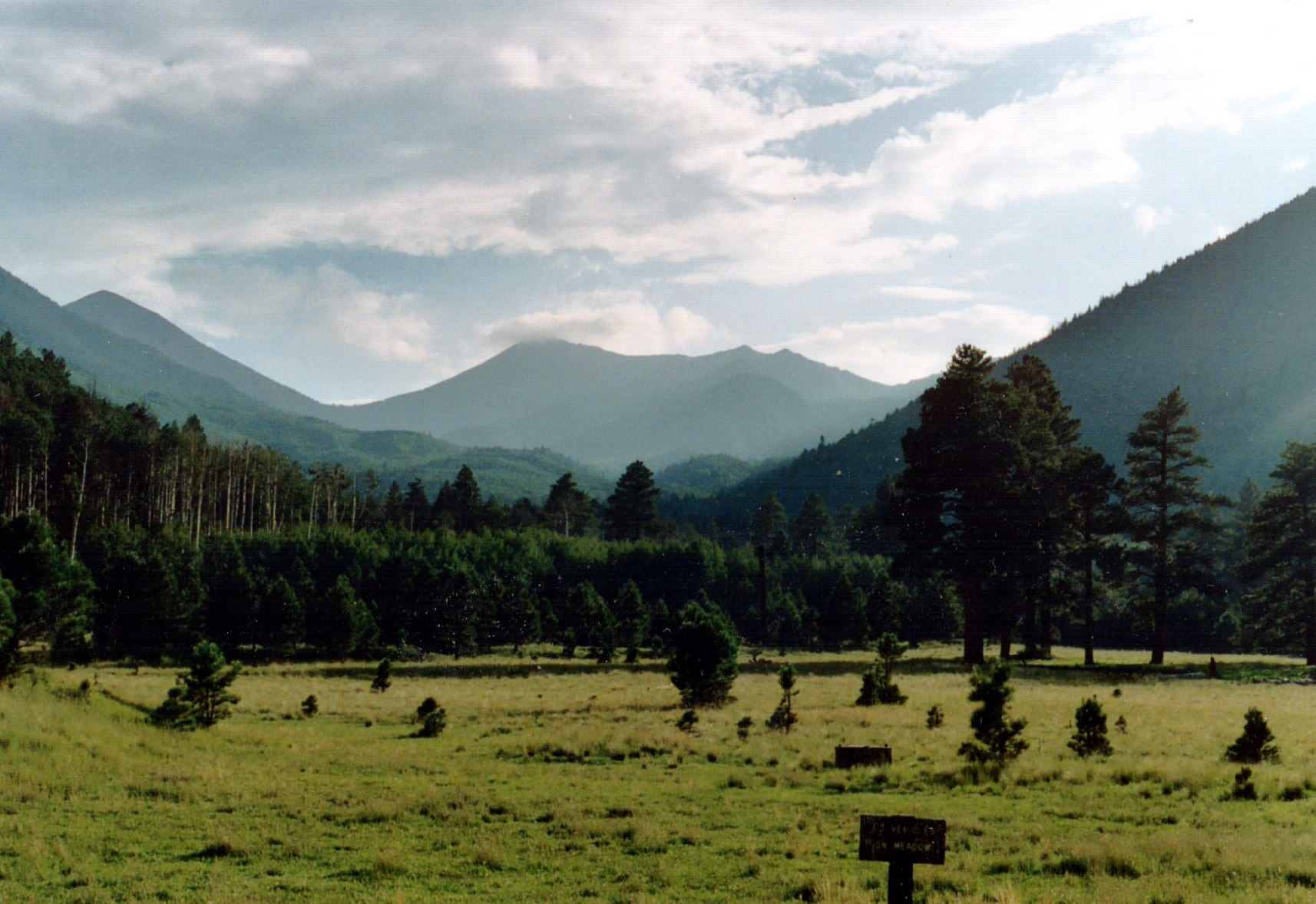
The San Francisco Peaks (with Agassiz center), Fall 2007

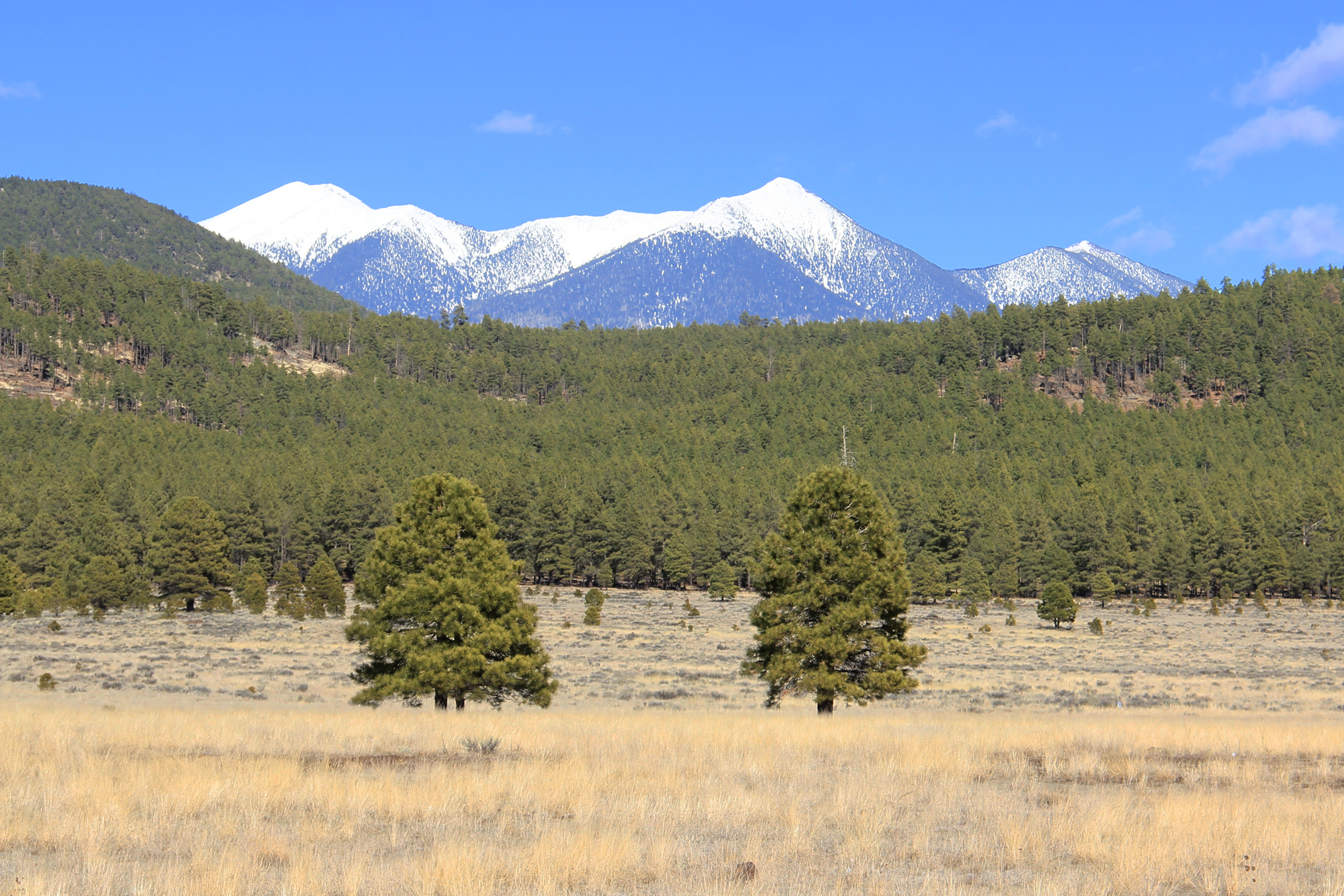
The San Francisco Peaks as seen from Bellemont, Arizona, Winter 2014

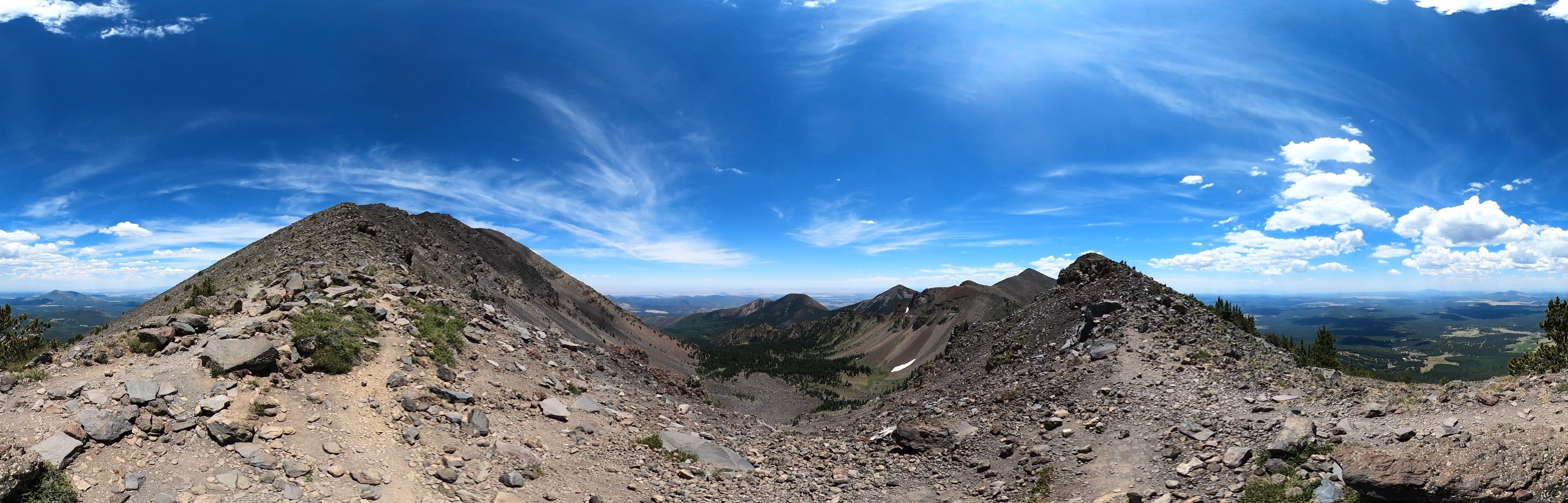
Panorama, taken from above tree-line near Humphrey's Peak (on left)

The six highest individual peaks in Arizona are contained in the range:

- Humphreys Peak, 12,637 feet (3,852 m)
- Agassiz Peak, 12,356 feet (3,766 m)
- Fremont Peak, 11,969 feet (3,648 m)
- Aubineau Peak, 11,838 feet (3,608 m)
- Rees Peak, 11,474 feet (3,497 m)
- Doyle Peak, 11,460 feet (3,493 m)

The mountain provides a number of recreational opportunities, including wintertime snow skiing and hiking the rest of the year. Hart Prairie is a popular hiking area and Nature Conservancy preserve located below the mountain's ski resort, Arizona Snowbowl.

Humphreys Peak (latitude 35°20'47" N) and Agassiz Peak (latitude 35°19'33" N) are the two farthest south-lying mountain peaks in the contiguous United States that rise to a height of more than 12,000 feet (3,700 m) above sea level.

Around 200,000 years ago, the fully matured San Francisco Mountain is estimated to have been around 16,000 feet (4,900 m) in altitude. Since then, much of the mountain has been removed to create the "Inner Basin", a depressed collapse caldera within the outer ring of summits. The missing material may have been removed quickly and explosively by a lateral blast type of eruptive event – similar to the Mount St. Helens in Washington state in the form of a lateral eruption. Alternatively, this may have occurred gradually from landslides, erosion by water and glaciation, or a combination of these with such an eruption."

== History ==
In 1629, 147 years before San Francisco, California, received that name, Spanish friars founded a mission at a Hopi Indian village in honor of St. Francis, 65 miles from the peaks. Seventeenth century Franciscans at Oraibi village gave the name San Francisco to the peaks to honor St. Francis of Assisi, the founder of their order. The mountain man Antoine Leroux visited the San Francisco Peaks in the mid-1850s, and guided several American expeditions exploring and surveying northern Arizona. Leroux guided them to the only reliable spring, one on the western side of the peaks, which was later named Leroux Springs.

Around 1877, John Willard Young, a son of the Mormon leader Brigham Young, claimed the area around Leroux Springs, and he built Fort Moroni, a log stockade, to house railroad tie-cutters for the Atlantic & Pacific Railroad, which was then being built across northern Arizona.

In 1898, U.S. President William McKinley established the San Francisco Mountain Forest Reserve, at the request of Gifford Pinchot, the head of the U.S. Division of Forestry. The local reaction was hostile – citizens of Williams, Arizona, protested and the Williams News editorialized that the reserve "virtually destroys Coconino County". In 1908, the San Francisco Mountain Forest Reserve became a part of the new Coconino National Forest.

A highway known as the San Francisco Mountain Boulevard was constructed in 1926 by John W. Weatherford. Earlier plans for a longer road to the higher peaks never came to fruition.

In 2002, Arizona Snowbowl, the ski resort on the peaks, proposed a plan to expand and begin snowmaking using reclaimed water made of treated sewage effluent. A coalition of Indian tribes and environmental groups sued the Coconino National Forest, which leases the land to the ski resort, in an attempt to stop the proposed expansion, citing serious impacts to traditional culture, public health, and the environment. In 2011, construction began on a wastewater pipeline to the peaks. In response, there was an ongoing series of protest actions including demonstrations and lockdowns in which protesters chained themselves to construction equipment. In 2012, a federal appeals court ruled in favor of Arizona Snowbowl, and wastewater to snow conversion began in the 2012–2013 ski season.

== Ecology ==
The biologist Clinton Hart Merriam studied these mountains and surrounding areas in 1889, describing a set of six life zones found from the bottom of the Grand Canyon to the summit of the mountains, based on elevation, latitude, and average precipitation. He designated their characteristic flora, as follows:

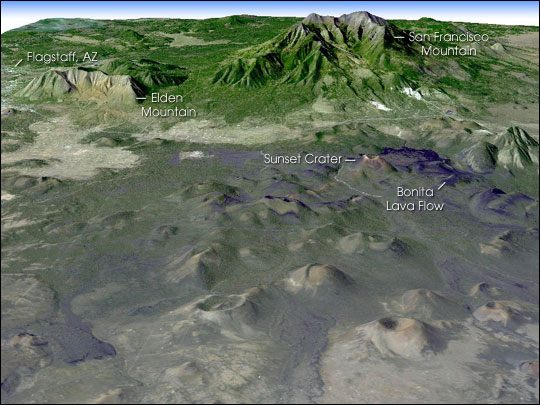
Composite image of the Peaks and the San Francisco volcanic field, looking SW towards Flagstaff. NASA image from satellite imagery projected onto a digital elevation model.

- Lower Sonoran Zone – Sonoran Desert plants
- Upper Sonoran Zone – pinyon and juniper woodlands
- Transition Zone – ponderosa pine forests
- Canadian Zone – mixed conifer forest
- Hudsonian Zone – spruce-fir or subalpine conifer forest
- Arctic-Alpine Zone – alpine tundra

Merriam considered that these life zones could be extended to cover all the world's vegetation types with the addition of only one more zone, the tropical zone.

The San Francisco Peaks themselves contain four of the six life zones. The four life zones that are found along the slopes of the San Francisco Peaks are listed below along with their approximate elevation ranges, dominant tree species found within each of the four life zones, and average annual precipitation of each life zone:

- Ponderosa pine forests – The elevation of the zone ranges from approximately 6,000 to 8,500 feet (1,800 to 2,600 m). The dominant tree species is the southwestern ponderosa pine (Pinus ponderosa var. Brachyptera). Gambel oak (Quercus gambelii) is a common associate of the ponderosa pine at lower elevations in the forest along with New Mexico locust (Robina neomexicana). At higher elevations, associates include southwestern white pine (Pinus strobiformis), Rocky Mountain Douglas-fir, (Pseudotsuga menziesii var. glauca), Rocky Mountain white fir (Abies concolor var. concolor), and quaking aspen (Populus tremuloides). The average annual precipitation in this zone is 18 to 26 inches (460 to 660 mm).
- Mixed conifer forest – The elevation of this zone ranges from approximately 8,000 to 9,500 feet (2,400 to 2,900 m). Species such as Douglas-fir (Pseudotsuga menziesii var. glauca), white fir (Abies concolor), limber pine (Pinus flexilis var. reflexa), blue spruce. (Picea pungens), and less commonly Southwestern white pine (Pinus flexilis) form mixed stands in this community, with Ponderosa pine (Pinus ponderosa var. Brachyptera) joining the mix on warmer slopes. The average annual precipitation in the mixed conifer forest is 25 to 30 inches (640 to 760 mm).
- Subalpine conifer forest – The elevation of this zone varies from approximately 9,500 to 11,500 feet (2,900 to 3,500 m) feet. The dominant tree species of this zone are Engelmann spruce (Picea engelmannii subsp. engelmannii), corkbark fir (Abies lasiocarpa var. arizonica), quaking aspen (Populus tremuloides) and the Rocky Mountain bristlecone pine. (Pinus aristata). The average annual precipitation in the subalpine forest is 30 to 40 inches (760 to 1,020 mm).
- Alpine tundra – The San Francisco Peaks are the home of the only alpine tundra environment in Arizona, occupying 1,200 acres (4.9 km^{2}) above 10,600 feet (3,200 m). Only a few small herbaceous plants have established themselves in the tundra. One of these species, is the endemic and threatened San Francisco Peaks groundsel (Packera franciscana), which is found nowhere else in the world. The average annual precipitation in the tundra is 35 to 40 inches (890 to 1,020 mm).

== In native culture ==
The San Francisco Peaks have considerable religious significance to thirteen local American Indian tribes, including the Apache, Havasupai, Navajo, Hopi, and Zuni. In particular, the peaks form the Navajo sacred mountain of the west, called Dookʼoʼoosłííd. The peaks are associated with the color yellow, and they are said to contain abalone inside, to be secured to the ground with a sunbeam, and to be covered with yellow clouds and evening twilight. They are gendered female.

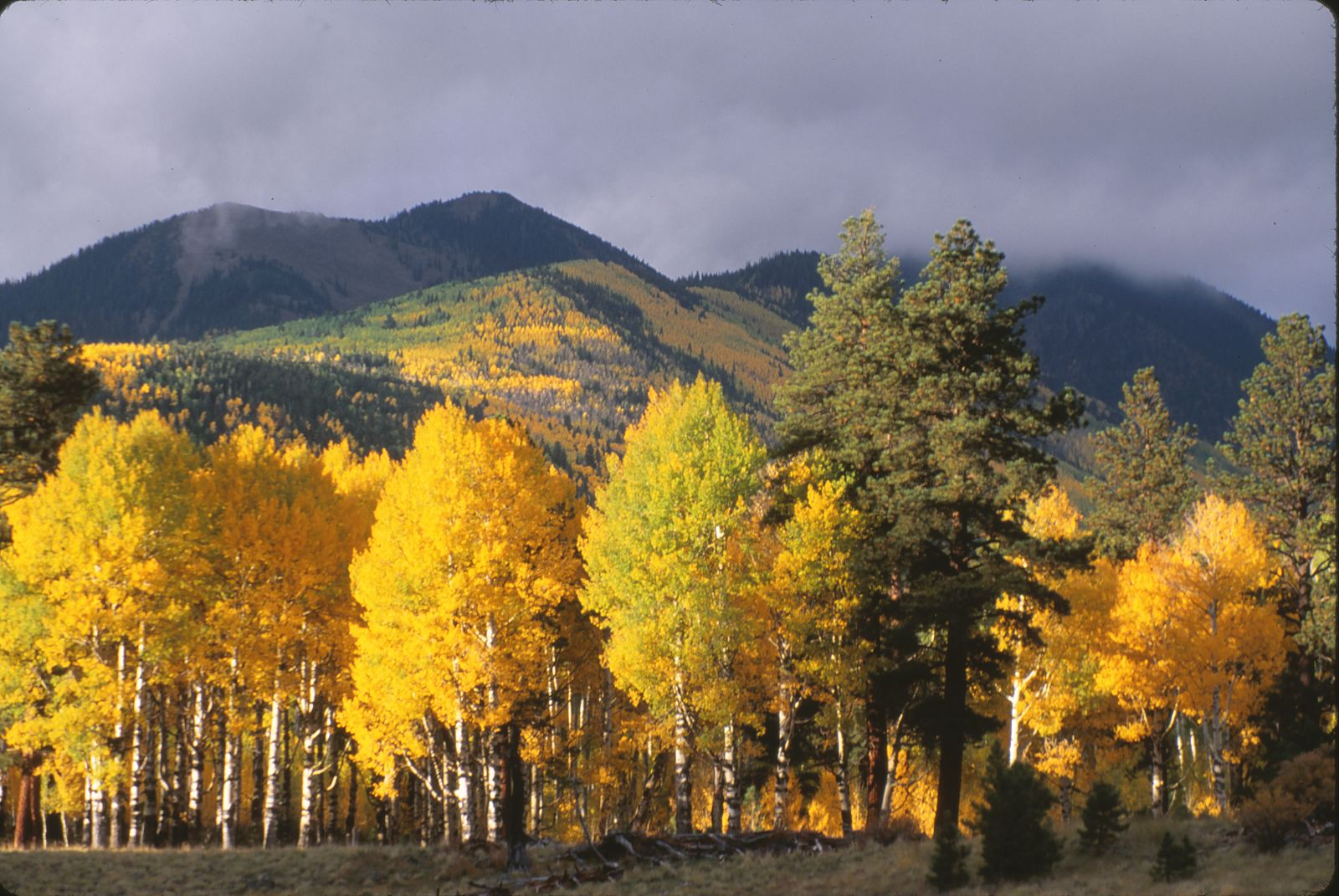
Lockett Meadow, 1996

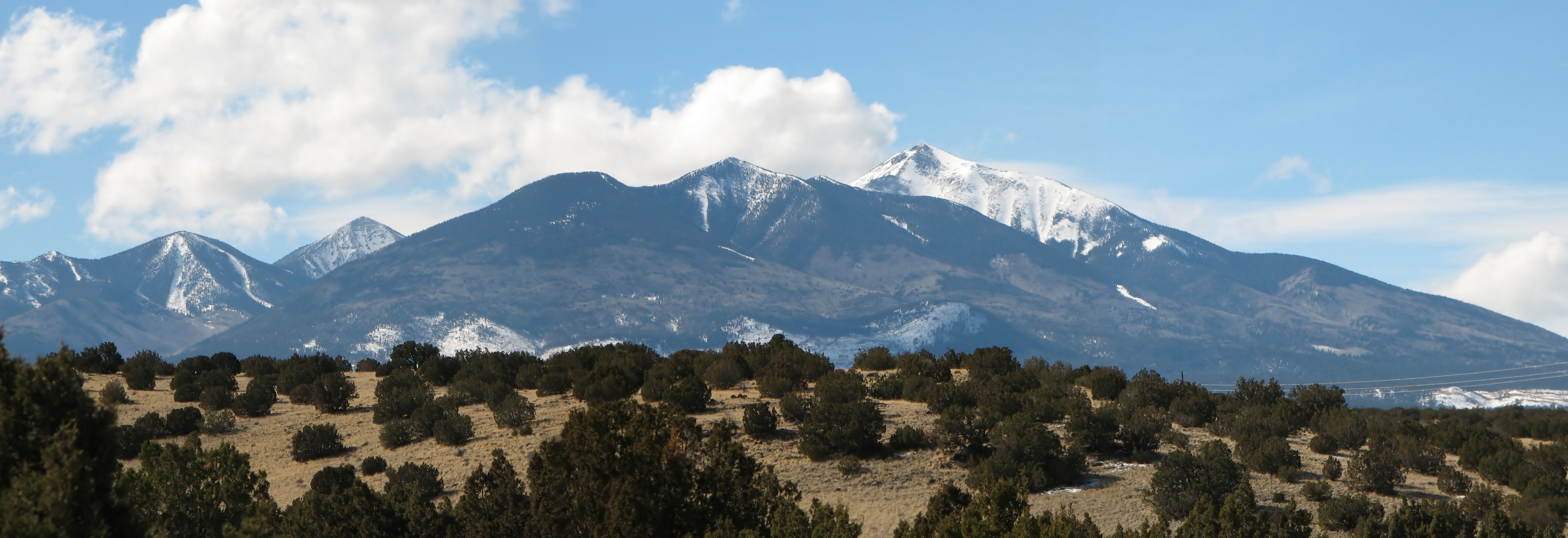
San Francisco Peaks viewed from U.S. Route 89

For the Hopi people, the San Francisco Peaks are associated with the intercardinal direction southwest. They constitute ritually pure sacred spaces, and are used as sources for ceremonial objects. The alignment of the sunset from the peaks to Hopi villages on Black Mesa is used to calculate the winter solstice, signifying "the beginning of a new year, with a new planting season and new life". The peaks are seen as the home of the katsinam or kachina spirits, ancestors who have become clouds following their death. Katsinam are invited to Hopi villages to serve as ethical and spiritual guides to the Hopi community from midwinter to midsummer. Other Native American peoples also relate kachina spirits to heavy snowfalls on the peaks.

Aaloosaktukwi, Humphrey's Peak, holds particular religious significance and is associated with the deity Aaloosaka, a symbol of the Two-Horn Society, a religious group among the Hopi dating to the occupation of the Awat’ovi village on Antelope Mesa.

Depiction of the peaks in association with calendar-keeping is attested in a kiva at the Hisatsinom settlement of Homol'ovi, which was occupied from 1250 to 1425; katsinam imagery dates to the 13th century as well.

There are several names for the San Francisco Peaks in local languages:

- Dookʼoʼoosłííd–(Navajo) "Dookʼoʼoosłííd" means "the summit that never melts" or "the mountain peak that never thaws". James A. Hardy renders it as "shining on top".
- Nuvaʼtukyaʼovi – (Hopi) (Nuvaʼtukyaʼovi, which means "place-of-snow-on-the-very-top")
- Dził Tso – Dilzhe’e – (Apache)
- Tsii Bina – Aaʼku – (Acoma)
- Nuvaxatuh – Nuwuvi – (Southern Paiute)
- Hvehasahpatch or Huassapatch – Havasu ʼBaaja – (Havasupai)
- Wikʼhanbaja – Hwalʼbay – (Hualapai)
- Wi꞉mun Kwa – Yavapai
- Sunha Kʼhbchu Yalanne – A:shiwi (Zuni)
- ʼAmat ʼIikwe Nyava – Hamakhav – (Mojave)
- Sierra sin Agua – (Spanish)
- The Peaks – (Anglo Arizonans)
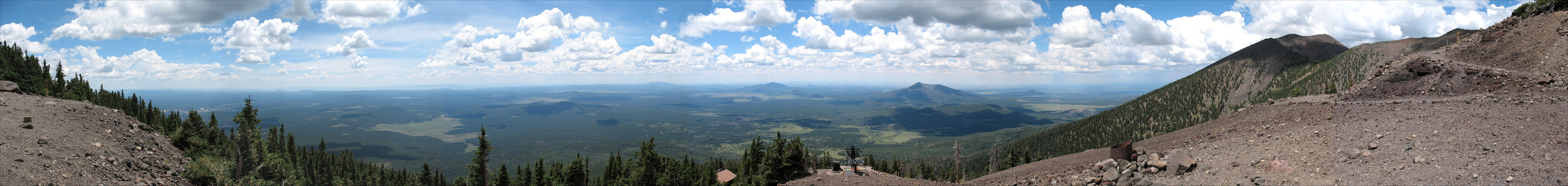
180 degree S/W panorama from the top of the Agassiz Peak chairlift

== See also ==
- San Francisco volcanic field
- List of mountains and hills of Arizona by height
