= Sunset Crater =

Cinder cone in Coconino County, Arizona, US

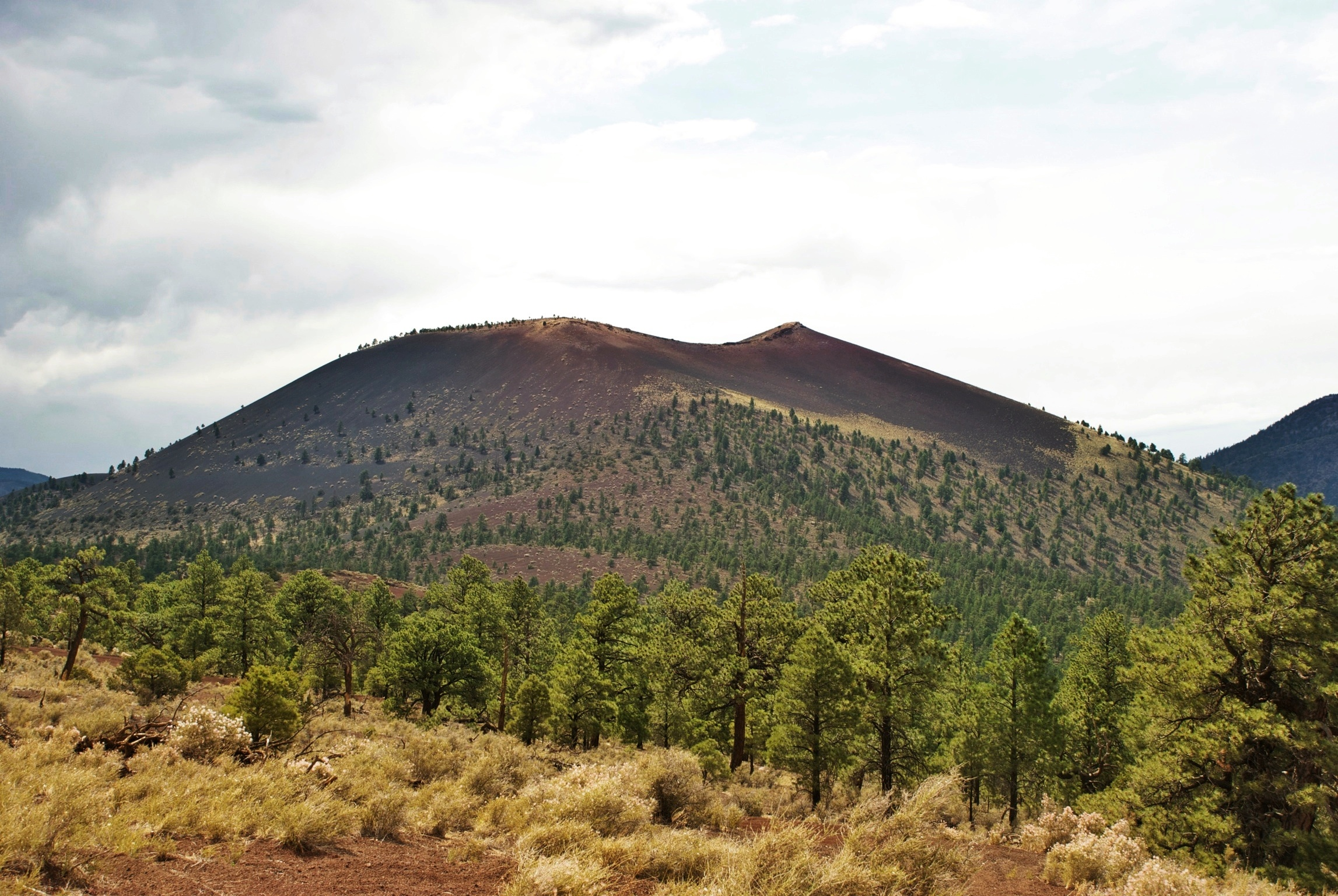
- Sunset Crater from the Cinder Hills

Highest point
- Elevation: 8,042 ft (2,451 m) NAVD 88
- Prominence: 999 ft (304 m)
- Coordinates: 35°21′52″N 111°30′13″W

Geography
- Location: Coconino County, Arizona, U.S.
- Topo map: USGS Sunset Crater East

Geology
- Rock age: ~950 years
- Mountain type: Cinder cone
- Volcanic field: San Francisco volcanic field
- Last eruption: 1075 ± 25 years

Climbing
- Easiest route: Hike
- Sunset Crater Volcano National Monument
- IUCN category III (natural monument or feature)
- Area: 3,138 acres (12.70 km^{2})
- Established: May 26, 1930
- Visitors: 108,348 (in 2025)
- Governing body: National Park Service
- Website: Sunset Crater Volcano National Monument

Sunset Crater is a cinder cone located north of Flagstaff in the U.S. state of Arizona, the youngest in a string of volcanoes (the San Francisco volcanic field) close to the nearby San Francisco Peaks. The crater is within the Sunset Crater Volcano National Monument.

== Formation ==
The date of the eruptions that formed the 340-meter-high cone (1,120 ft) was initially calculated using tree-ring dates, which suggested that the eruption began between the growing seasons of AD 1064–1065. However, more recent geologic and archaeological evidence places the eruption around AD 1085. The largest vent of the eruption, Sunset Crater itself, was the source of the Bonito and Kana-a lava flows that extended about 2.5 kilometers (1.6 mi) northwest and 9.6 kilometers (6 mi) northeast, respectively. Additional vents along a 10-kilometer-long fissure (6.2 mi) extending southeast produced small spatter ramparts and a 6.4-kilometer-long lava flow (4 mi) to the east. The Sunset Crater eruption peaked at VEI 4 (Sub-Plinian), produced a total of 0.52 km^{3} of ejecta, had an eruption column between 20-30km tall and produced a blanket of ash and lapilli covering an area of more than 2,100 square kilometers (810 sq mi), which forced the temporary abandonment of settlements of the local Sinagua people.

== Current condition ==
In the centuries since its eruption, Sunset Crater has partially revegetated, with pines and wildflowers. The volcano is the namesake for the Sunset Crater Beardtongue (Penstemon clutei).

In early June of 2015, a website with black-and-white satellite images reported steam rising from the crater, sparking internet fears that Sunset Crater was erupting. However, local rangers and other officials quickly confirmed there was no volcanic activity on the ground, and it was determined that the "steam" was likely either a cloud formation or a smoke plume from a nearby prescribed burn. Additionally, Sunset Crater volcano is part of the San Francisco volcanic field, which is monitored by the Yellowstone Volcano Observatory. Although the overall volcanic field is classified as a moderate threat, geologists assert that Sunset Crater is extinct, and poses no threat.

In 1973, severe trail damage from hikers forced the National Park Service to close the trail to the top of the crater, and backcountry hiking is no longer allowed. But other designated trails remain, including one that allows visitors to see inside nearby Lenox Crater. One trail below the summit skirts the substantial Bonito Lava Flow, hardened lava that appears black and barren, having devastated the forest in its path. The lava flow also created an ice cave (or "lava tube") that has been closed to the public for safety reasons since 1984, after a partial collapse of the tube.

== Sunset Crater Volcano National Monument ==
Sunset Crater Volcano National Monument is a U.S. national monument created to protect the crater. The monument is managed by the National Park Service in conjunction with nearby Wupatki National Monument and Walnut Canyon National Monument.

A 1-mile (1.6 km), self-guided loop trail is located at the base of Sunset Crater, but hiking to the summit is not permitted. A trail providing access to the summit and crater was closed in 1973 because of excessive erosion caused by hikers. A visitor center is located near the park entrance, 15 miles (24 km) north of Flagstaff, Arizona, accessed from U.S. Highway 89.

In 1928, a Hollywood film company, Famous Players–Lasky Corporation, planned to detonate large quantities of explosives on the side of Sunset Crater in order to create an avalanche for Zane Grey's motion picture Avalanche. Public outcry over this plan led in part to the proclamation of Sunset Crater Volcano National Monument by President Herbert Hoover in 1930.

In April 2022, the Tunnel Fire burned over the entirety of the monument, although the visitor center was spared. In December 2022, 98 acres including the visitor center and administrative facilities were transferred from Coconino National Forest to the national monument.

In 2016, Sunset Crater NM, along with Walnut Canyon NM and Wupatki NM, was designated an International Dark Sky Park by DarkSky International, in recognition of the quality of the star-filled night sky and commitment to reducing light pollution.

== Climate ==
According to the Köppen Climate Classification system, Sunset Crater has a Continental climate, abbreviated "Dsb" on climate maps.

Climate data for Sunset Crater, Arizona (1991–2020 normals, extremes 1969–present)
Month	Jan	Feb	Mar	Apr	May	Jun	Jul	Aug	Sep	Oct	Nov	Dec	Year
Record high °F (°C)	68 (20)	70 (21)	78 (26)	82 (28)	91 (33)	99 (37)	98 (37)	97 (36)	92 (33)	87 (31)	76 (24)	68 (20)	99 (37)
Mean maximum °F (°C)	57.0 (13.9)	59.8 (15.4)	68.1 (20.1)	75.2 (24.0)	83.2 (28.4)	92.8 (33.8)	93.8 (34.3)	89.5 (31.9)	84.9 (29.4)	77.5 (25.3)	67.4 (19.7)	60.8 (16.0)	94.9 (34.9)
Mean daily maximum °F (°C)	43.9 (6.6)	46.6 (8.1)	53.9 (12.2)	61.1 (16.2)	70.2 (21.2)	82.2 (27.9)	84.2 (29.0)	80.7 (27.1)	75.3 (24.1)	64.6 (18.1)	53.3 (11.8)	44.0 (6.7)	63.3 (17.4)
Daily mean °F (°C)	28.4 (−2.0)	31.4 (−0.3)	37.4 (3.0)	44.1 (6.7)	51.9 (11.1)	62.0 (16.7)	66.6 (19.2)	63.9 (17.7)	57.5 (14.2)	46.3 (7.9)	35.8 (2.1)	28.2 (−2.1)	46.1 (7.9)
Mean daily minimum °F (°C)	12.8 (−10.7)	16.3 (−8.7)	21.0 (−6.1)	27.0 (−2.8)	33.6 (0.9)	41.9 (5.5)	49.0 (9.4)	47.1 (8.4)	39.8 (4.3)	27.9 (−2.3)	18.4 (−7.6)	12.4 (−10.9)	28.9 (−1.7)
Mean minimum °F (°C)	−4.1 (−20.1)	−0.3 (−17.9)	5.6 (−14.7)	11.9 (−11.2)	18.6 (−7.4)	27.1 (−2.7)	38.4 (3.6)	37.7 (3.2)	26.5 (−3.1)	15.5 (−9.2)	2.9 (−16.2)	−5.1 (−20.6)	−8.7 (−22.6)
Record low °F (°C)	−26 (−32)	−28 (−33)	−9 (−23)	−1 (−18)	12 (−11)	16 (−9)	27 (−3)	27 (−3)	12 (−11)	−5 (−21)	−12 (−24)	−25 (−32)	−28 (−33)
Average precipitation inches (mm)	1.41 (36)	1.10 (28)	1.08 (27)	0.65 (17)	0.69 (18)	0.31 (7.9)	2.65 (67)	3.45 (88)	1.72 (44)	1.39 (35)	0.87 (22)	1.72 (44)	17.04 (433)
Average snowfall inches (cm)	12.2 (31)	9.4 (24)	6.1 (15)	4.2 (11)	0.8 (2.0)	0.0 (0.0)	0.0 (0.0)	0.0 (0.0)	0.0 (0.0)	1.2 (3.0)	3.5 (8.9)	11.9 (30)	49.3 (125)
Average precipitation days (≥ 0.01 inch)	5.6	5.8	4.9	3.8	4.1	2.3	11.9	14.2	7.6	5.0	3.6	5.8	74.6
Average snowy days (≥ 0.1 inch)	4.1	4.4	2.7	1.8	0.4	0.0	0.0	0.0	0.0	0.4	1.9	4.4	20.1
Source: National Oceanic and Atmospheric Administration.

== See also ==
- List of national monuments of the United States
