= List of submarine volcanoes =

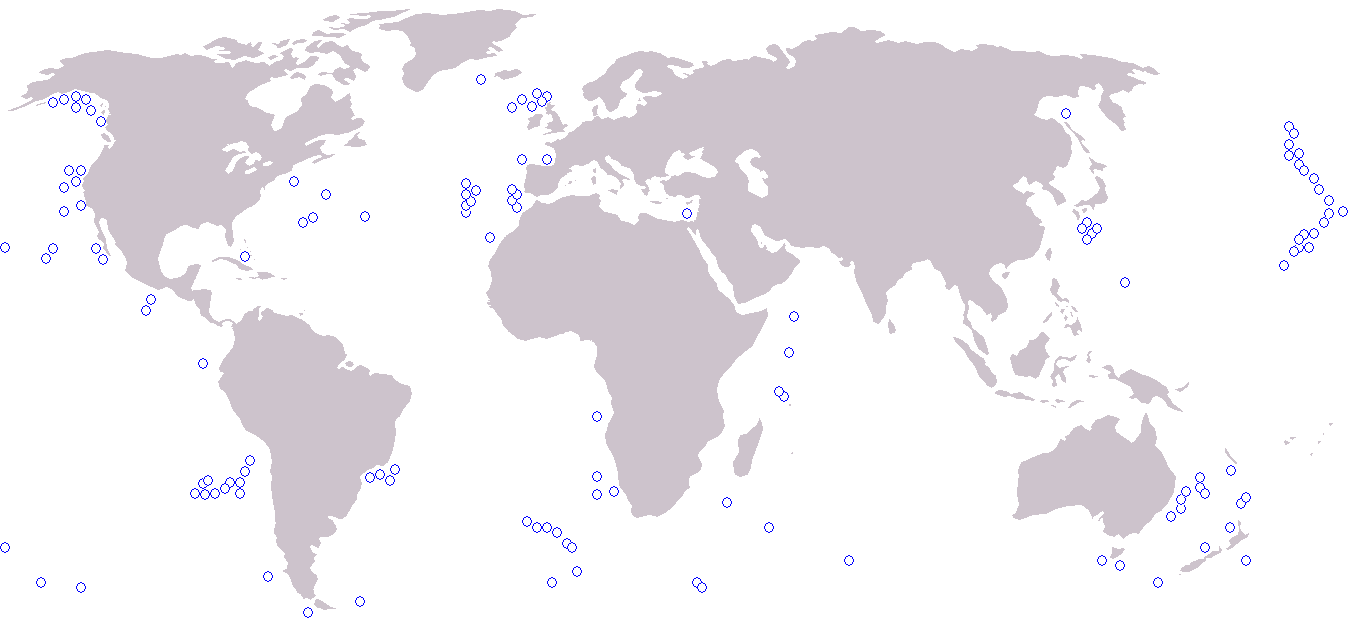
Map of world's major seamounts.

A list of active and extinct submarine volcanoes and seamounts located under the world's oceans. There are estimated to be 40,000 to 55,000 seamounts in the global oceans. Almost all are not well-mapped and many may not have been identified at all. Most are unnamed and unexplored. This list is therefore confined to seamounts that are notable enough to have been named and/or explored.

== List ==
Name	Summit Elevation	Approximate elevation above seafloor	Location	Coordinates	Last known eruption
Adams Seamount	−39 m (−128 ft)	3,500 m (11,000 ft)	Pitcairn Islands	25.37°S 129.27°W	50 BCE ± 1000 years
Addington Volcanic Field	−74 m (−243 ft)		United States	55.44°N 134.17°W	Pleistocene
Ahyi Seamount	−75 m (−246 ft)	1,925 m (6,300 ft)	United States	20.42°N 145.03°E	2024
Ampère Seamount	−55 m (−180 ft)	4,445 m (15,000 ft)	Portugal	35.08°N 12.55°W	
Avos' Rocks	35 m (110 ft)		Russia	49.72°N 154.12°E	Pleistocene
Axial Seamount	−1,400 m (−4,590 ft)		United States	45.55°N 130.00°W	2015
Banc Capel			France	24°45.70′S 159°42.13′E	
Banua Wuhu	−5 m (−16 ft)	400 m (1,300 ft)	Indonesia	3.138°N 125.491°E	1919
Bear Seamount	−1,100 m (−3,610 ft)	2,000 m (6,560 ft)	United States	39.92°N 67.4°W	
Boomerang Seamount	−650 m (−2,130 ft)		French Southern and Antarctic Lands	37.7216°S 77.8221°E	1995
Bounty Seamount	−450 m (−1,480 ft)	3,950 m (13,000 ft)	Pitcairn Islands	25°11′S 129°23′W	
Bowie Seamount	−24 m (−79 ft)	3,000 m (9,800 ft)	Canada	53.3°N 135.63°W	18,000 BP
Brothers Volcano	−1,350 m (−4,430 ft)		New Zealand	34.875°S 179.075°E	
Campi Flegrei del Mar di Sicilia	−8 m (−26 ft)		Italy	37.1°N 12.7°E	1867
Central Bismarck Sea	−1,300 m (−4,300 ft)		Papua New Guinea	3.03°S 147.78°E	1972
Central Segment	−3,300 m (−11,000 ft)		United States	3.03°S 147.78°E	Pleistocene
Chamorro	−804 m (−2,640 ft)		Northern Mariana Islands	20.81°N 144.704°E	Pleistocene
Cheref	−2,800 m (−9,190 ft)		Northern Mariana Islands	19.406°N 145.468°E	Pleistocene
Cleft Segment	−2,140 m (−7,020 ft)		North Pacific Ocean	44.83°N 130.3°W	1986
CoAxial Segment	−2,400 m (−7,870 ft)		North Pacific Ocean	46.62°N 129.58°W	1993
Clark	−860 m (−2,820 ft)		New Zealand	36.466°S 177.839°E	
Cobb Seamount	−34 m (−110 ft)	2,743 m (9,000 ft)	North Pacific Ocean	46°44′N 130°47′W	
Cobb Segment	−2,100 m (−6,900 ft)		North Pacific Ocean	46.88°N 129.33°W	1180BCE
Cole Seamount	−2,400 m (−7,900 ft)		New Zealand	33.411°S 179.953°E	Pleistocene
Coleman Seamount	−717 m (−2,400 ft)		Solomon Islands	8.841°S 157.16°E	
Concepción Bank	−158 m (−520 ft)	2,433 m (8,000 ft)	Spain	30.021°N 12.724°W	
Cortes Bank	−1 m (−3.3 ft)		United States	32.478°N 119.215°W	
Curacoa	−33 m (−110 ft)		Tonga	15.62°S 173.67°W	1979
Dom João de Castro Bank	−14 m (−46 ft)		Portugal	38.23°N 26.63°W	1720
Doyo Seamount	−590 m (−1,900 ft)	2,340 m (7,700 ft)	Japan	27.68°N 140.8°E	
Dugong Seamount	−1,170 m (−3,800 ft)		Tonga	15.431°S 175.725°W	
East Blanco Depression	−3,000 m (−9,800 ft)		North Pacific Ocean	44.267°N 129.879°W	
East Diamante	−127 m (−420 ft)		Northern Mariana Islands	15.93°N 145.67°E	
East Epi	833 m (2,700 ft)		Vanuatu	16.68°S 168.37°E	2023
East Gakkel Ridge at 85°E	−3,800 m (−12,000 ft)		Arctic Ocean	85.608°N 85.25°E	1999
East Mata	−1,286 m (−4,200 ft)		Tonga	15.102°S 173.677°W	Pleistocene
Echo Bank	−255 m (−840 ft)	3,445 m (11,000 ft)	Spain	25.40°N 19.44°W	72 Million Years Ago
Eifuku	−551 m (−1,800 ft)		Northern Mariana Islands	21.409°N 144.161°E	Pleistocene
Eldey	70 m (230 ft)		Iceland	63.733°N 23°W	1926
Empedocles	−7 m (−23 ft)	400 m (1,300 ft)	Italy	37°09′49″N 12°43′07″E	
Emperor of China	−2,850 m (−9,350 ft)		Indonesia	6.62°S 124.22°E	
Endeavor Segment	−2,050 m (−6,700 ft)		North Pacific Ocean	47.95°N 129.1°W	3940BCE
Escanaba Segment	−1,700 m (−5,600 ft)		United States	40.98°N 127.5°W	2260BCE
Esmeralda Bank	−74 m (−240 ft)		Northern Mariana Islands	14.958°N 145.249°E	
Feinga Seamount	−393 m (−1,300 ft)		Tonga	20.154°S 175.163°W	Pleistocene
Fonuafoʻou	−17 m (−55.8 ft)		Tonga	20.32°S 175.42°W	1993
Forecast Seamount	−1,456 m (−4,800 ft)		Guam	13.4°N 143.92°E	
Foundation Seamounts			South Pacific Ocean	35°S 120°W	2001
Fukujin	−217 m (−710 ft)		Northern Mariana Islands	21.93°N 143.47°E	1974
Fukutoku-Okanoba	−29 m (−95 ft)		Japan	24°16′48″N 141°29′06″E	2021
Gaeta Bay Volcanic Field			Italy	40.978°N 13.663°E	Pleistocene
Galapagos Rift	−2,430 m (−8,000 ft)		Ecuador	0.792°N 86.15°W	1996
Gamble	−900 m (−3,000 ft)		New Zealand	27.2°S 177.41°W	Pleistocene
Gaojianshi			China (disputed)	17°N 112.5°E	Pleistocene
Gemini-Ocostar	−33 m (−110 ft)		Vanuatu	20.957°S 170.13°E	1996
Getsuyo Seamount	−1,095 m (−3,600 ft)		Japan	29.306°N 140.471°E	Pleistocene
Giggenbach Volcano	−65 m (−213 ft)		New Zealand	30.036°S 178.712°E	
Giljanes	−700 m (−2,300 ft)		New Zealand	34.775°S 178.579°E	Pleistocene
Gorringe Ridge	−25 m (−82 ft)		Portugal	36°28′36″N 11°35′1″W	
Graveyard Seamounts	−750 m (−2,460 ft)	−400 m (−1,310 ft)	New Zealand	42°45′S 180°0′W	Cenozoic
Hankow Reef	−5 m (−16.4 ft)		Papua New Guinea	4.883°S 146.717°E	
Haungaroa	−660 m (−2,200 ft)		New Zealand	32.617°S 179.624°W	Pleistocene
Havre Seamount	−720 m (−2,360 ft)	1,030 m (3,400 ft)	New Zealand	31.11°S 179.00°W	2012
Healy	−980 m (−3,220 ft)		New Zealand	34.98°S 179.00°E	1360
Hebrides Terrace Seamount	−980 m (−3,220 ft)	1,400 m (4,593 ft)	United Kingdom	56.28°N 10.17°W	Cenozoic
Henry Seamount	−3,650 m (−12,000 ft)	660 m (2,200 ft)	Spain	27.34°N 17.789°W	350,000?
Hinepuia	−850 m (−2,800 ft)		New Zealand	26.39°S 177.26°W	Pleistocene
Hinetapeka	−140 m (−460 ft)		New Zealand	28.831°S 177.826°W	Pleistocene
Hollister Ridge	−1,000 m (−3,300 ft)		South Pacific Ocean	53.998°S 139.845°W	
Home Reef	−10 m (−33 ft)		Tonga	18°59′28″S 174°45′47″W	2006
Hunga Tonga–Hunga Haʻapai	−114 m (−370 ft)		Tonga	20.545°S 175.3925°W	2022
Ile des Cendres	−20 m (−66 ft)		Vietnam	10.158°N 109.014°E	1923
Inambajima	74 m (240 ft)		Japan	33.648°N 139.302°E	Pleistocene
Jackson Segment	−3,100 m (−10,000 ft)		United States	42.15°N 127.05°W	
Jasper Seamount	−70 m (−230 ft)	3,300 m (10,827 ft)	Mexico	30°26.40′N 122°44.40′W	
Kaena	−1,200 m (−3,940 ft)		United States	22.822°N 158.772°E	Pleistocene
Kaikata Seamount	−165 m (−540 ft)	2,350 m (7,700 ft)	Japan	26.667°N 140.929°E	
Kaitoku Seamount	−95 m (−310 ft)		Japan	26.122°N 141.096°E	2023
Kana Keoki	−700 m (−2,300 ft)	3,000 m (9,843 ft)	Solomon Islands	8.75°S 157.03°E	
Kamaʻehuakanaloa Seamount (Lōʻihi)	−969 m (−3,180 ft)	3,000 m (9,840 ft)	United States	18.92°N 155.27°W	1996
Kasuga 1	−598 m (−2,000 ft)	2,400 m (7,900 ft)	Northern Mariana Islands	21.765°N 143.71°E	1959
Kasuga 2	−274 m (−900 ft)	2,830 m (9,300 ft)	Northern Mariana Islands	21.6°N 143.637°E	
Kasuga 3	−1,325 m (−4,300 ft)		Northern Mariana Islands	21.399°N 143.626°E	
Kavachi	−20 m (−66 ft)		Solomon Islands	8.991°S 157.979°E	2021
Kawio Barat	−1,874 m (−6,100 ft)		Indonesia	4.675°N 125.088°E	Pleistocene
Kayo Seamount	−814 m (−2,700 ft)		Japan	29.064°N 140.537°E	Pleistocene
Kelvin Seamount			United States	38.48°N 63.59°W	
Kemp Caldera	−80 m (−262 ft)		United Kingdom	59°42′S 28°15′W	
Kibblewhite	−1,000 m (−3,300 ft)		New Zealand	34.576°S 179.262°E	Pleistocene
Kick 'em Jenny	−185 m (−607 ft)	1,300 m (4,270 ft)	Grenada	12.30°N 61.64°W	2015
Kinyo Seamount	−838 m (−2,700 ft)		Japan	28.084°N 140.802°E	Pleistocene
Kita-Bayonnaise	−360 m (−1,200 ft)		Japan	32.1°N 139.85°E	
Kita-Fukutokutai	−73 m (−240 ft)		Japan	24.417°N 141.417°E	1954
Kolbeinsey Ridge	5 m (16 ft)		Iceland	66.67°N 18.5°W	1755
Kolumbo	−10 m (−33 ft)		Greece	36°31′00″N 25°29′30″E	1650
Kurose Hole	−114 m (−374 ft)		Japan	33.4°N 139.68°E	
Kuiwai	−560 m (−1,800 ft)		New Zealand	33.159°S 179.957°W	Pleistocene
Kuwae	−4 m (−13.1 ft)		Vanuatu	16.85°S 168.52°E	
Lateiki	43 m (140 ft)		Tonga	19.18°S 174.87°W	2019
Lobster	−1,500 m (−4,900 ft)		Tonga	15.333°S 176.283°W	
Macdonald seamount	−40 m (−131 ft)	4,200 m (13,800 ft)	French Polynesia	28°58.7′S 140°15.5′W	1989
Māhukona	−1,080 m (−3,500 ft)		United States	20.17°N 156.42°W	Pleistocene
Malumalu	−145 m (−480 ft)		American Samoa	14.601°S 169.787°W	
Malutut	−515 m (−1,700 ft)		American Samoa	14.371°S 170.174°W	Pleistocene
Mariana Back-Arc Segment at 15.5°N	−4,100 m (−13,000 ft)		Northern Mariana Islands	15.406°N 144.596°E	2015
Marsili	−450 m (−1,480 ft)	3,000 m (9,800 ft)	Italy	39°15′00″N 14°23′40″E	
Mikura Seamount	−321 m (−1,100 ft)		Japan	33.725°N 139.408°E	Pleistocene
Minami-Hiyoshi	−107 m (−350 ft)	1,300 m (4,300 ft)	Japan	23.5°N 141.935°E	1975
Moai		2,500 m (8,200 ft)	Easter Island	27.1°S 109.85°W	100,000 BCE
Mokuyo Seamount	−933 m (−3,100 ft)	1,780 m (5,800 ft)	Japan	28.327°N 140.572°E	
Monaco Bank	−197 m (−646 ft)		Portugal	37.6°N 25.88°W	1911
Monowai Seamount	−132 m (−433 ft)		New Zealand	25.887°S 177.188°W	2008
Moua Pihaa	−312 m (−1,000 ft)	3,500 m (11,000 ft)	French Polynesia	18.325°S 148.525°W	1970
Muirfield Seamount	−16 m (−52.5 ft)	4,800 m (16,000 ft)	Australia	13°13′30″S 96°7′30″E	
Myōjin-shō	−11 m (−36.1 ft)		Japan	31°55.1′N 140°1.3′E	
Nadir Seamount	−900 m (−3,000 ft)		Guinea	8°45′N 16°55′W	
Napo Taroare	0 m (0.0 ft)		Indonesia	4.048°N 125.345°E	Pleistocene
Ngatoroirangi	−340 m (−1,100 ft)		New Zealand	33.729°S 179.827°E	Pleistocene
Nichiyo Seamount	−1,042 m (−3,400 ft)		Japan	29.482°N 140.327°E	Pleistocene
Nieuwerkerk	−2,285 m (−7,500 ft)		Indonesia	6.60°S 124.675°E	
Nikko	−392 m (−1,300 ft)	2,608 m (8,600 ft)	Japan	23.078°N 142.326°E	
Niua Volcanic Complex	−677 m (−2,200 ft)		Tonga	15.122°S 173.549°W	Pleistocene
Niuatahi	−1,270 m (−4,200 ft)	730 m (2,400 ft)	Tonga	15.368°S 174.003°W	
North Gorda Ridge Segment	−3,000 m (−9,800 ft)		United States	42.67°N 126.78°W	1996
North Kawio	109 m (360 ft)		Indonesia	4.684°N 125.468°E	Pleistocene
Northeast Bank	−57 m (−190 ft)		American Samoa	14.061°S 170.084°W	Pleistocene
Northern EPR at 10.7°N	−2,900 m (−9,500 ft)		North Pacific Ocean	10.73°N 103.58°W	2003
Northern EPR at 16°N	−2,300 m (−7,500 ft)		Mexico	15.83°N 105.43°W	50BCE
Northern EPR at 17°N	−2,700 m (−8,900 ft)		Mexico	16.55°N 105.32°W	50BCE
Northern EPR at 9.8°N	−2,500 m (−8,200 ft)		North Pacific Ocean	9.83°N 104.3°W	2006
Northern Matas	−1,855 m (−6,100 ft)	1,300 m (4,300 ft)	Tonga	15.005°S 173.793°W	Pleistocene
NW Eifuku	−1,535 m (−5,000 ft)		Northern Mariana Islands	21.485°N 144.043°E	
NW Rota-1	−517 m (−1,700 ft)		Northern Mariana Islands	14.601°N 144.775°E	2010
Oliver-Speight	−1,840 m (−6,000 ft)		New Zealand	32.288°S 179.591°W	Pleistocene
Ōmurodashi			Japan	34°32′48″N 139°26′30″E	active
Onoharajima	114 m (370 ft)		Japan	34.045°N 139.387°E	Pleistocene
Orca Seamount		500 m (1,640 ft)	British Antarctic Territory	62°26′00″S 58°24′00″W	inactive
Palinuro Seamount	−70 m (−230 ft)	3,000 m (9,840 ft)	Italy	39°29′04″N 14°49′44″E	8040 BCE
Patton Seamount	−160 m (−520 ft)	3,900 m (12,795 ft)	United States	54°34.80′N 150°26.40′W	33 Million Years Ago
Phoenix Segment	−3,000 m (−9,800 ft)		United States	41.404°N 127.38°W	Pleistocene
Pico Fracture Zone	−4,200 m (−14,000 ft)		North Atlantic Ocean	38.75°N 38.08°W	1865
Piip	−300 m (−984 ft)	2,200 m (7,200 ft)	Russia	55.42°N 167.33°E	5050 BCE
Poyo	−2,830 m (−9,300 ft)		Northern Mariana Islands	19.223°N 145.524°E	Pleistocene
Protector Shoal	−55 m (−180 ft)	1,200 m (3,900 ft)	South Georgia and the South Sandwich Islands	56°01′S 28°25′W	1962
Pukao		2,500 m (8,200 ft)	Easter Island	26.9323°S 110.2490°W	>100,000 BCE
Putoto	−260 m (−850 ft)		New Zealand	27.857°S 177.621°W	Pleistocene
Rakahore	−640 m (−2,100 ft)		New Zealand	26.81°S 177.4°W	Pleistocene
Rapuhia	−650 m (−2,130 ft)		New Zealand	34.776°S 178.505°E	Pleistocene
Rocard	−2,515 m (−8,250 ft)		French Polynesia	17.662°S 148.586°W	1972
Romanche Fracture Zone	−1,528 m (−5,010 ft)		South Atlantic Ocean	0.433°S 19.596°W	
Ruby	−174 m (−571 ft)		Northern Mariana Islands	15.605°N 145.572°E	2023
Rumble I	−1,100 m (−3,610 ft)		New Zealand	35.5°S 178.9°E	
Rumble II East	−1,150 m (−3,770 ft)		New Zealand	35.418°S 178.652°E	Pleistocene
Rumble II West	−1,200 m (−3,940 ft)	1,800 m (5,900 ft)	New Zealand	35.353°S 178.527°E	
Rumble III	−220 m (−722 ft)	2,300 m (7,500 ft)	New Zealand	35.745°S 178.478°E	2008
Rumble IV	−500 m (−1,640 ft)		New Zealand	36.13°S 178.05°E	
Rumble V	−400 m (−1,310 ft)	2,000 m (6,600 ft)	New Zealand	36.139°S 178.197°E	
Rungapapa Knoll			New Zealand	37.547°S 176.98°E	Pleistocene
Seamount JF6	−642 m (−2,110 ft)		Chile	33.427°S 76.87°W	Pleistocene
Seamount X	−1,230 m (−4,040 ft)		Guam	13.25°N 144.02°E	
Sedlo Seamount	−660 m (−2,170 ft)	2,340 m (7,680 ft)	Azores	40°12.8′N 26°15.8′W	
Shestakov			Russia	49.75°N 154.75°E	
Silent II East	−1,250 m (−4,100 ft)		New Zealand	35.21°S 178.978°E	Pleistocene
Silent II West	−780 m (−2,560 ft)		New Zealand	35.169°S 178.902°E	Pleistocene
Sofugan	99 m (320 ft)	2,200 m (7,218 ft)	Japan	29.794°N 140.342°E	
Sonne	−995 m (−3,260 ft)		New Zealand	34.077°S 179.576°E	Pleistocene
Soso	−1,814 m (−5,950 ft)		American Samoa	13.764°S 170.235°W	Pleistocene
South Daikoku	−301 m (−988 ft)		Northern Mariana Islands	21.023°N 144.525°E	Pleistocene
South Sarigan Seamount	−184 m (−604 ft)		Northern Mariana Islands	16.58°N 145.78°E	2010
Southern EPR at 17.5°S	−2,566 m (−8,420 ft)		South Pacific Ocean	17.436°S 113.206°W	1990
Southern EPR at 18.2°S	−2,650 m (−8,690 ft)		South Pacific Ocean	18.175°S 113.35°W	1890
Southern EPR at 18.5°S	−2,600 m (−8,530 ft)		South Pacific Ocean	18.53°S 113.42°W	1915
Southern EPR at 8°S	−2,800 m (−9,190 ft)		South Pacific Ocean	8.27°S 107.95°W	1969
Submarine 1922	−5,000 m (−16,400 ft)		Indonesia	3.97°N 124.17°E	
Submarine Volcano NNE of Iriomotejima	−200 m (−660 ft)		Japan	24.57°N 123.93°E	1924
Suiyo Seamount	−1,418 m (−4,650 ft)		Japan	28°36′0″N 140°38′0″E	
Sumisujima	136 m (446 ft)		Japan	31.44°N 140.051°E	1916
Supply Reef	−8 m (−26 ft)		Northern Mariana Islands	20.13°N 145.1°E	1989
Syoyo Ridge	−481 m (−1,580 ft)		Japan	22.546°N 142.863°E	Pleistocene
Tafu-Maka	−1,400 m (−4,590 ft)		Tonga	15.37°S 174.23°W	2010
Tagoro			Spain	27.6153°N 18.0264°W	2011
Tamai	−2,655 m (−8,710 ft)		American Samoa	13.746°S 170.543°W	Pleistocene
Taney Seamounts			United States	20.13°N 125.3375°W	
Tangaroa	−600 m (−1,970 ft)		New Zealand	36.321°S 178.028°E	
Teahitiʻa	−1,450 m (−4,760 ft)		French Polynesia	17.564°S 148.821°W	1985
The Paps	−1,600 m (−5,250 ft)	2,700 m (8,860 ft)	Spain	25.92°N 20.3°W	91.1 ± 0.2 Ma
Thompson	−1,250 m (−4,100 ft)		New Zealand	35.285°S 178.863°E	Pleistocene
Tisa	−883 m (−2,900 ft)		American Samoa	14.407°S 171.221°W	Pleistocene
Tjörnes Fracture Zone	−75 m (−246 ft)		Iceland	66.309°N 17.118°W	1868
Tokara Hirase	27 m (88.6 ft)		Japan	30.036°N 130.058°E	Pleistocene
Tracey Seamount	−900 m (−2,950 ft)		Guam	13.65°N 144.42°E	Pleistocene
Tropic Seamount	−970 m (−3,180 ft)		North Atlantic Ocean	23.89°N 20.72°W	60 Ma
Tulaga	−79 m (−259 ft)		American Samoa	14.518°S 170.024°W	Pleistocene
Tuzo Wilson Seamounts	−1,410 m (−4,630 ft)	700 m (2,300 ft)	Canada	51.4°N 130.9°W	Holocene
Udintsev Transform	−5,700 m (−18,700 ft)		South Pacific Ocean	56.153°S 143.373°W	
Unnamed volcano (Ibugos)	−24 m (−79 ft)		Philippines	20.33°N 121.75°E	1854
Vailuluʻu	−590 m (−1,940 ft)		American Samoa	14°12′54″S 169°3′30″W	2001-2004
Vance Segment	−1,985 m (−6,510 ft)		North Pacific Ocean	45.3°N 130.1°W	Pleistocene
Vavilov	−800 m (−2,600 ft)		Italy	39.86°N 12.59°E	
Vema seamount	−26 m (−85 ft)	4,900 m (16,100 ft)	South Atlantic Ocean	31°38′S 8°20′E	11 Million Years Ago
Volcano OP	−875 m (−2,870 ft)		New Zealand	28.218°S 177.692°W	Pleistocene
Volcano Q	−1,200 m (−3,940 ft)		New Zealand	27.468°S 177.506°W	Pleistocene
Volcano W	−900 m (−2,950 ft)		New Zealand	31.85°S 179.18°E	
Volsmar	−1,600 m (−5,200 ft)		Vanuatu	21.485°S 170.218°E	Pleistocene
Walters Shoals	−18 m (−59.1 ft)	4,750 m (15,580 ft)	Indian Ocean	33°12′S 43°50′E	
Walvis Ridge	−1,200 m (−3,940 ft)		South Atlantic	32.958°S 5.22°W	2002
West Mata	−1,100 m (−3,610 ft)		Tonga	15.1°S 173.75°W	2009
West Valley Segment	−2,550 m (−8,400 ft)		Canada	48.78°N 128.64°W	Pleistocene
Whakatāne Seamount	−900 m (−2,950 ft)	1,200 m (3,900 ft)	New Zealand	36°49′S 177°28′E	
Wright	−750 m (−2,460 ft)		New Zealand	31.5°S 179.2°E	
Yersey	−3,800 m (−12,500 ft)		Indonesia	7.53°S 123.95°E	
Yokosuka	−1,060 m (−3,500 ft)		New Zealand	34.709°S 178.545°E	Pleistocene
Zealandia Bank	0 m (0.0 ft)		Northern Mariana Islands	16.88°N 145.85°E	Pleistocene

== See also ==
- Lists of volcanoes
- Submarine volcanoes topics
- Submarine topography
- List of seamounts in the Southern Ocean
