= List of volcanoes in French Polynesia =

This is a list of active and extinct volcanoes.

Name	Elevation		Location	Last eruption
Name	meters	feet	Coordinates	Last eruption
Bora Bora	727	2385	16°26′40″S 151°45′5″W	3.1 Mya
Mangareva	441	1446	23°06′34″S 134°57′57″W	extinct
Mehetia	435	1427	17.87°S 148.07°W	<31,000 years ago
Moua Pihaa	-180	-590	18.32°S 148.67°W	1970
Nuku Hiva	1224	4015	-	extinct
Raiatea	-	-	-	2.29 Mya
Rocard	-2100	-6888	17.642°S 148.60°W	1972
Teahitia	-1600	-5248	17.57°S 148.85°W	1985
Tohiea	1207	-		1.36 Mya
Orohena	2241	-		1.67 Mya
Mount Ronui	1332	-	17.822767°S 149.215352°W	0.25 Mya
