= Rocard =

Seamount in the Pacific Ocean

Highest point
- Elevation: −2,515 m (−8,251 ft)
- Coordinates: 17.662°S 148.586°W

Geography
- Location: French Polynesia

Geology
- Mountain type: Submarine volcano
- Volcanic zone: Society hotspot
- Last eruption: 1972

Rocard is a submarine volcano in French Polynesia, located between the island of Mehetia and the Teahitia seamount. The volcano's summit is 2515m below sealevel. It has erupted in March 1966, September 1971, and July 1972.

The volcano was first located in 1976 using seismograph records, and its existence confirmed by a bathymetric survey.

In 2011 and 2013, seismic records suggested shallow magma outpouring from the volcano.
