= Kibblewhite =

Kibblewhite is a surname. Notable people with the surname include:

- Ebeneezer J. Kibblewhite (fl. 1860–1910), English editor
- Ethel Kibblewhite (1873–1947), host of an artistic and literary salon in London
- James Kibblewhite (1770–1845), English politician
- Paul Kibblewhite (1941–2015), New Zealand scientist
- Michael Kibblewhite, English choral conductor

also

- Graham Kibble-White British writer and popular culture critic
- Roseanne Kibblewhite, New Zealand artist
- Andrew Kibblewhite, Secretary of Justice
