= Iriomote submarine volcano =

Submarine volcano in the East China Sea

Submarine Volcano NNE of Iriomotejima
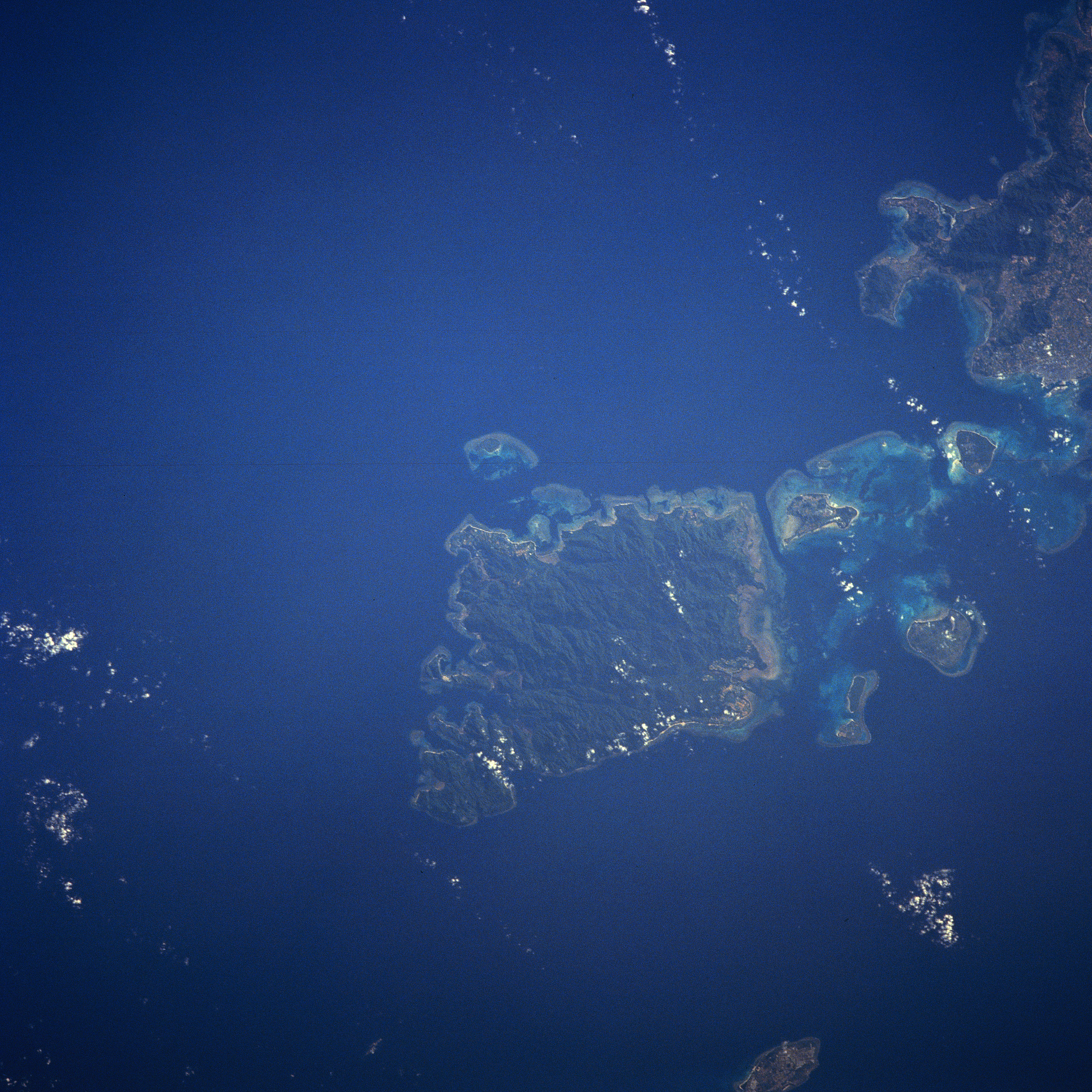
- Satellite image of Iriomote Island–the volcano is located approximately in the center of the upper part of the image.

- Location within East China Sea
- Summit depth: −200 m (−656 ft)

Location
- Coordinates: 24.57°N 123.93°E
- Country: Japan

Geology
- Type: Submarine volcano
- Last eruption: October 1924

The Iriomote submarine volcano is an active submarine volcano located 20 km (12 mi) north of Iriomote Island, Japan. The volcano is also known as the Submarine Volcano NNE of Iriomotejima. Its only reported eruption occurred on October 31, 1924—measuring a Volcanic explosivity index (VEI) of 5, it is one of the largest historical eruptions in Japan. However, scientific knowledge about the eruption is sparse.

== 1924 eruption ==
A volcanic eruption was first observed by the crew of the Miyako Maru, a ship belonging to Mitsui O.S.K. Lines. It traveled from Iriomote Island en route to the Port of Keelung. A report was filed by Captain Naoichi Kano while sailing the Hatoma Channel between Iriomote and Hatoma islands towards Ishigaki Island. At 9:35 a.m, the sea was reportedly discolored over 10 km (6.2 mi). Pumice blanketed the ocean from the islands of Akari to Iriomote. The Captain Kano concluded that this was the product of a submarine eruption and diverted its course from east towards Ishigaki Island to north-northeast. At 11:05 a.m., due to poor visibility from worsening weather, the ship returned to Nakara Port on Iriomote Island, from where it had departed.

Immediately after returning to port, the Captain Kano reported to the incident to Okinawa authorities, the nearby weather station, and Osaka Merchant Marine by telegram. The local newspaper on Ishigaki Island published an extra on the same day to cover the eruption. In the newspaper, a local shaman predicted that a tsunami would strike on the day after the eruption. Rumors spread across Ishigaki Island, causing confusion among the islanders. Residents evacuated to an elementary on a hill and refused to sleep for fear of the tsunami. Several people committed burglary in homes abandoned by their inhabitants. Local knowledge of a destructive tsunami affecting the Sakishima Islands in 1771 was a factor that contributed to the chaos.

The harbour on Iriomote Island, close to the eruption, was covered in a layer of pumice and ash which lasted for three months. The port was closed and ships were unable to sail. About three weeks after the eruption, pumice washed up on the coasts of various parts of the Okinawa Islands. The Tsushima and Kuroshio currents carried the pumice to other parts of Japan. One year following the eruption, pumice was found on Rebun Island in Hokkaido. The distribution of pumice provided information for ocean currents research due to its sparse understanding at the time. A month after the eruption, pumice washed up along the coast of the Yaeyama Islands. Some pumice were the size of a tatami, enough to keep two or three people afloat. An estimated 1 km^{3} (0.24 cu mi) of pumice was ejected during the eruption. The pumice is 73 percent composed of rhyolite and silicon dioxide, and 1 percent of potassium oxide.

== Eruption size ==
The estimated volume of this eruption was 1 km^{3} (0.24 cu mi), corresponding to a VEI of 5. It is one of the largest eruptions in Japan, with only seven events confirmed within the last 1,000 years. It was recently attributed to the volcano in 2022 by the Global Volcanism Program.
