= Taney Seamounts =

Underwater volcanoes west of San Francisco, CA, USA

- Location within Pacific Ocean

Highest point
- Coordinates: 36.6882°N 125.3375°W

Dimensions
- Volume: 11 km^{3} (3 cu mi) to 187 km^{3} (45 cu mi) in volume

Geography
- Location: Pacific Ocean, west of San Francisco
- Peaks: Five seamounts (underwater volcanoes)

Geology
- Rock age: ~26 million years
- Mountain type: Volcanic chain

The Taney Seamounts are a range of five extinct underwater volcanoes located 300 kilometres (160 nmi; 190 mi) west of San Francisco on the Pacific Plate. The seamounts were identified during the United States Geological Survey's scan of the Exclusive Economic Zone, conducted in the 1980s with the GLORIA sidescan sonar.
