= Moua Pihaa =

Seamount in the Pacific Ocean

Highest point
- Elevation: −160 m (−520 ft)
- Coordinates: 18.325°S 148.525°W

Geography
- Location: French Polynesia

Geology
- Mountain type: Submarine volcano
- Volcanic zone: Society hotspot
- Last eruption: 1970

Moua Pihaa is a submarine volcano in French Polynesia. It is located southwest of Mehetia in the Society Islands, and is the largest of a group of seamounts stretching between Mehetia and Tahiti. The volcano's summit is 160m below sea level.

The volcano was first located in 1976 using seismograph records, and its existence confirmed by a bathymetric survey.

Moua Pihaa was seismically active from 22 to 29 April 1969, and from 21 to 23 June 1970, which suggests that submarine eruptions have occurred.
