= NW Rota-1 =

Seamount in the United States of America

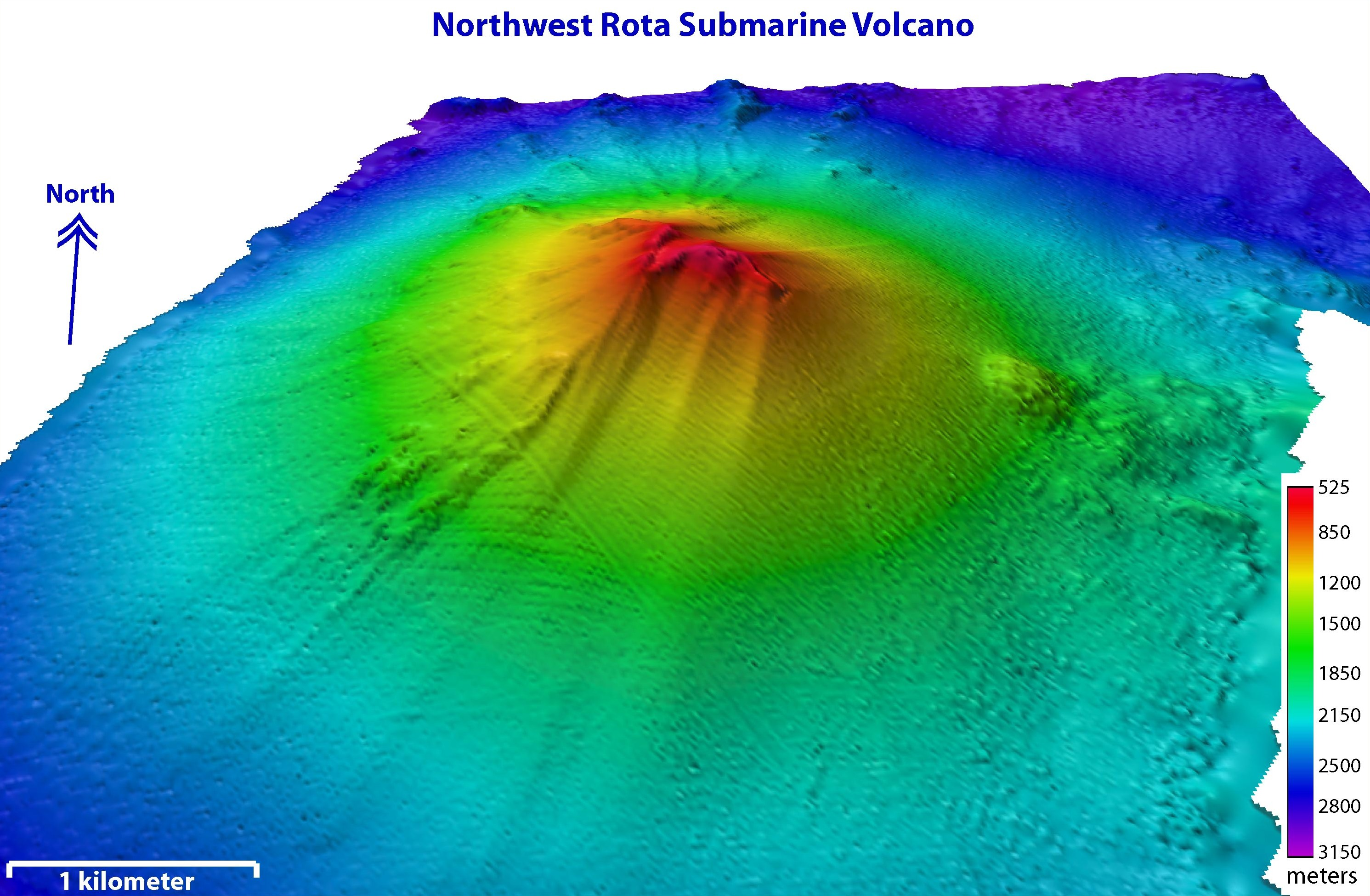
- NW Rota-1 seen from the south
- Summit depth: 1,696 feet (517 m)

Location
- Coordinates: 14.601°N 144.775°E

NW Rota-1 is a seamount in the Mariana Islands, northwest of Rota, which was discovered through its hydrothermal activity in 2003. The volcano has been observed to be erupting underwater, the first time that submarine explosive eruptions have been directly witnessed.

The summit of the seamount lies at 517 m (1,696 ft) below sea level, with a ridge capping off the seamount. It has several craters, the most active of which is located south of the summit ridge and is called "Brimstone Pit". Eruptions have been recorded in 2008–2010 and took the form of Strombolian eruptions with the emission of lava and large amounts of tephra. The erupted material is unstable and forms sediment flows and landslides; one large landslide occurred on 14 August 2009 and stripped part of the southern flank of NW Rota-1. Such landslides generate ash plumes underwater and are similar to large landslides at other active submarine volcanoes.

The activity gives rise to intense hydrothermal plumes, which contain droplets of molten sulfur and bubbles of carbon dioxide, among other compounds. It is estimated that NW Rota-1 releases 400,000 ± 100,000 tonne/year of carbon dioxide. The hydrothermal activity nourishes microbial mats and these in turn many animals, although the unstable environment from the frequent eruptions limits animal diversity.

== Research history ==
NW Rota-1 was discovered to be hydrothermally active by NOAA in 2003 and first mapped by the remotely operated vehicle (ROV) ROPOS in 2004. The volcano has repeatedly been targeted by dives of ROVs. Hydrophones have been placed at the summit and vent during several dives. NW Rota-1 is also known as "Northwest Rota-1".

NW Rota-1 is the first volcano where submarine explosive eruptions were directly observed, in 2004. The intensity of the eruptions is diminished by being underwater, allowing more direct observations than would be possible at subaerial volcanoes.

== Geography and geomorphology ==
NW Rota-1 is located 64 km (40 mi) northwest of Rota in the Commonwealth of the Northern Mariana Islands, and about 100 km (62 mi) north of Guam. It is part of the Mariana Trench Marine National Monument, which was established in 2009.

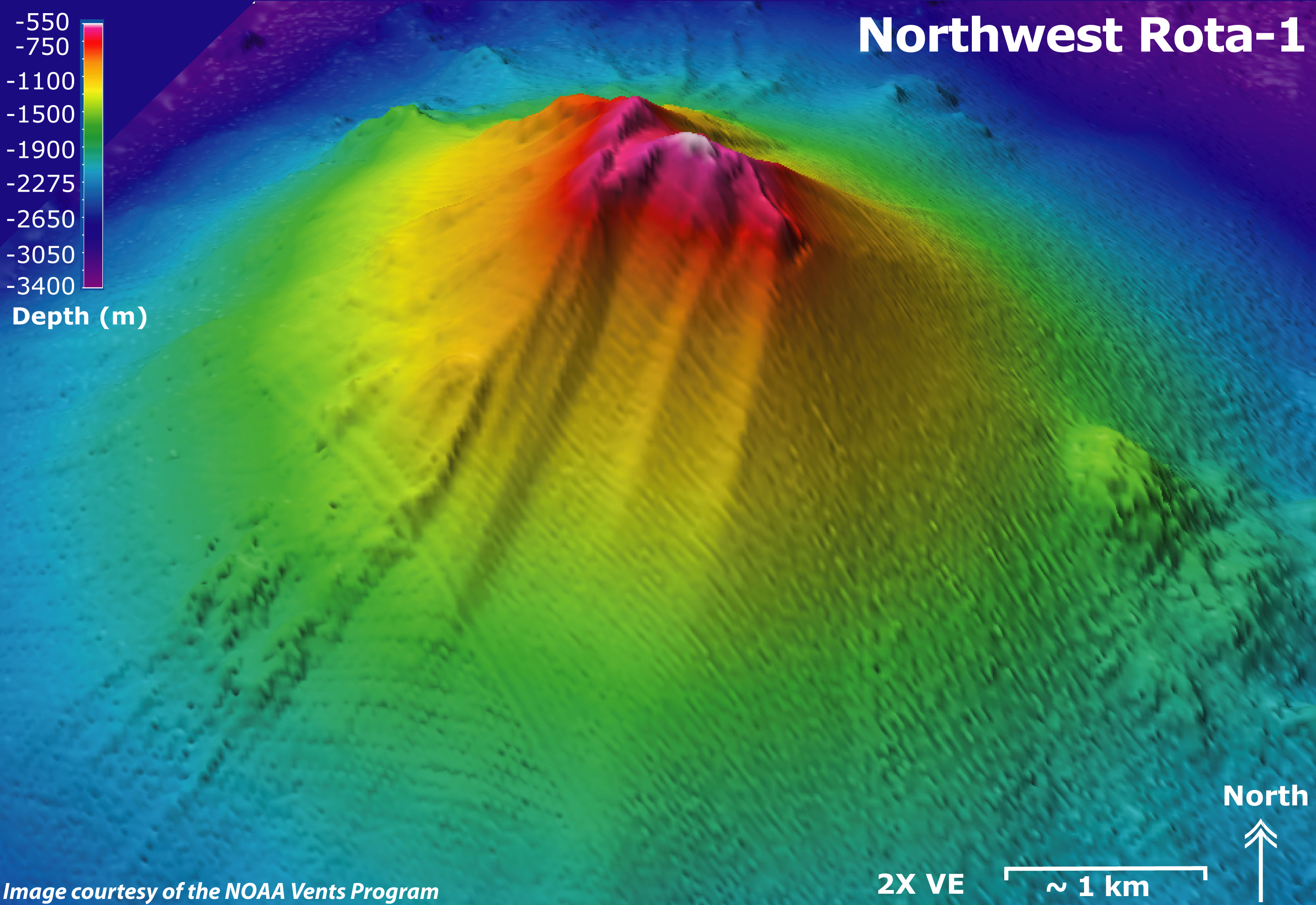
Bathymetric map viewed from the south

NW Rota-1 is a steep volcanic cone, which rises from a 16 kilometres (9.9 mi) wide base at 2,700–2,800 metres (8,900–9,200 ft) depth to 517 metres (1,696 ft) below sea level. The summit and slopes of the volcano are covered by volcanic debris (including ash and sand), sulfur globules and talus. Rock and lava outcrops and cemented breccia are also found; the outcrops are part of the inner structure of the volcano. The summit is formed by a northwest–southeast trending ridge that probably formed as a headwall of a landslide. Normal faults cut across the volcano and bound the summit ridge. An inactive summit is located 1,600 feet (500 m) northwest from the main summit at 600 metres (2,000 ft) depth.

The active crater "Brimstone Pit" lies 45 m (148 ft) south of the summit on the steep, debris covered slope of the volcano. A 100 metres (330 ft) wide depression east of the summit may be an older crater, now partially filled. Farther east lies the "Fault Shrimp" ridge, where diffuse hydrothermal venting takes place.

The appearance of the "Brimstone Pit" has changed over time:

- In March–April 2004 it was a 20 metres (66 ft) wide funnel-shaped pit situated atop a cinder cone and its northern rim was almost contiguous with the southern slope of the volcano.
- By October 2005, it had grown in height by about 66 feet (20 m) while the pit had shrunk in size and become less deep.
- When surveyed in April 2006, the cinder cone was gone. Presumably it had collapsed, leaving only a sulfur-encrusted remnant of the inner slope of the crater. Four 1–5 metres (3 ft 3 in – 16 ft 5 in) wide overlapping vents were present within the crater. Slide chutes and volcanic bombs were encountered below Brimstone Pit.
- In 2009, a lava debris cone appeared at Brimstone Pit. Pillow lavas were identified below the cone.

In 2010 other active vents appeared 30–40 metres (98–131 ft) below the summit on the southern flank. These are (from west to east) "Phantom", "Sulfur", "Styx" and "Charon". They form a 360 feet (110 m) long alignment that also contains Brimstone Pit as its middle member. The appearance of these new vents may be due to landslides disrupting the magma conduits.

=== Landsliding ===
Evidence of landslides is found over the entire volcano, and sediment flows have been observed from ROVs. They form when material accumulated around vents becomes unstable and collapses. The landslides generate plumes of ash-rich water which can spread kilometres from the volcano. Such plumes are a unique trait of volcanism at NW Rota-1 and have been identified at Kavachi, Monowai, NW Rota-1 and West Mata submarine volcanoes.

One such landslide took place on 14 August 2009 and removed debris that had accumulated around Brimstone Pit as well as the southern parts of the summit. Schnur et al. 2017 gave volume estimates of 0.53 cubic kilometres (0.13 cu mi) and 0.034 cubic kilometres (0.0082 cu mi) but despite this large volume it did not result in a detectable tsunami. It left rocky outcrops exposed that had previously been buried under looser material.

Cycles of volcano growth and collapse have been found at other seamounts like Monowai and West Mata, and much larger and less frequent collapses are recorded from large intraplate volcanoes such as Hawaii. Seismic activity, sea level changes and hydrothermal alteration appear to play a role in initiating landsliding.

== Geology ==
At the 2,500 kilometres (1,600 mi) Izu-Bonin-Mariana volcanic arc, the Pacific Plate subducts beneath the Philippine Plate. The subduction of the old Pacific Plate releases fluids from the downgoing slab into the mantle. The interaction between these fluids and the mantle fertilizes the latter and results in volcanic activity. Compared to ocean island volcanoes, these volcanoes are longer lived and produce more gas-rich magma.

The Mariana Arc contains 52-60 submarine volcanoes, about five times more than rise above sea level. At least 20 volcanoes including NW Rota-1 are hydrothermally active. The islands Guam, Rota and Saipan are uplifted parts of the forearc.

NW Rota-1 is part of South Mariana Seamount Province. It is the western end and largest member of a chain of four large and five smaller submarine volcanoes. This "cross-chain" is perpendicular to the main volcanic arc and is correlated to a slab discontinuity. The cross-chain lies in an area of crustal extension. Another volcano close to NW Rota-1 is Chaife, about 16 miles (25 km) east-northeast of the former. Esmeralda Bank and the caldera West Rota lie northwest and due south of NW Rota-1, respectively. There might be a shallow magma chamber at NW Rota-1, which could explain the vigorous hydrothermal activity.

=== Composition ===
The volcano is formed by andesite, basalt and basaltic andesite. The volcanic rocks define a calc-alkaline rock family with some components that border on the tholeiitic family. The rock family has a medium potassium content. Phenocryst phases contained in the rocks are olivine, plagioclase and pyroxene. Sulfur has been found encased in ejecta, which are often covered in volcanic glass from the interaction between seawater and lava. Volcanic rocks are porphyritic and contain many vesicles. The magma erupted at NW Rota-1 is among the most water rich of the entire Mariana Arc.

The formation of NW Rota-1 magmas appears to involve the melting of subducted, water-bearing sediments and the interaction of the resulting melts with the mantle wedge. Back-arc may also play a role. The interaction products rise as diapirs in two distinct populations, one with a large sediment component and one with a small one. Eventually liquids separate from crystals in the diapir and rise to the surface.

== Exhalations ==
Like other volcanoes, NW Rota-1 emits carbon dioxide (CO_{2}), hydrogen sulfide (H_{2}S), methane (CH_{4}), sulfur dioxide (SO_{2}) and water. The volcano produces about 400,000 ± 100,000 of CO_{2}, which is about 0.2–0.6% of the worldwide CO_{2} flux at subaerial volcanoes.

The particle-rich plumes and most exhalations originate from Brimstone Pit crater; however, diffuse degassing at the summit generates hydrothermal plumes as well. Because the water in the plumes is warmer than surrounding seawater, it rises under its own buoyancy about 100 metres (330 ft) above the vents. The water in the plumes is acidic and enriched in aluminum, the helium isotope helium-3, iron, manganese, phosphorus, silicon and sulfur are enriched in the plumes. The composition of the plumes depends on the location of their vents and changes during their ascent; elemental sulfur forms from the disproportionation of sulfur dioxide in the water column.

The carbon dioxide forms clear bubbles, which consist of about 90% CO_{2} and 10% H_{2}. These bubbles are on average 1–2 centimetres (0.39–0.79 in) wide and quickly rise owing to their buoyancy. Some vents continuously emit carbon dioxide bubbles, others only cyclically. Sulfur is generated by the mixture of sulfur-containing gases with water and forms droplets of liquid sulfur. Sulfur globules form from such droplets; they cover the ground like a powdery dusting and have been recovered from the surfaces of ROVs. Sulfur accumulating in the slopes forms agglomerates and crusts which cement the slopes, reducing their instability.

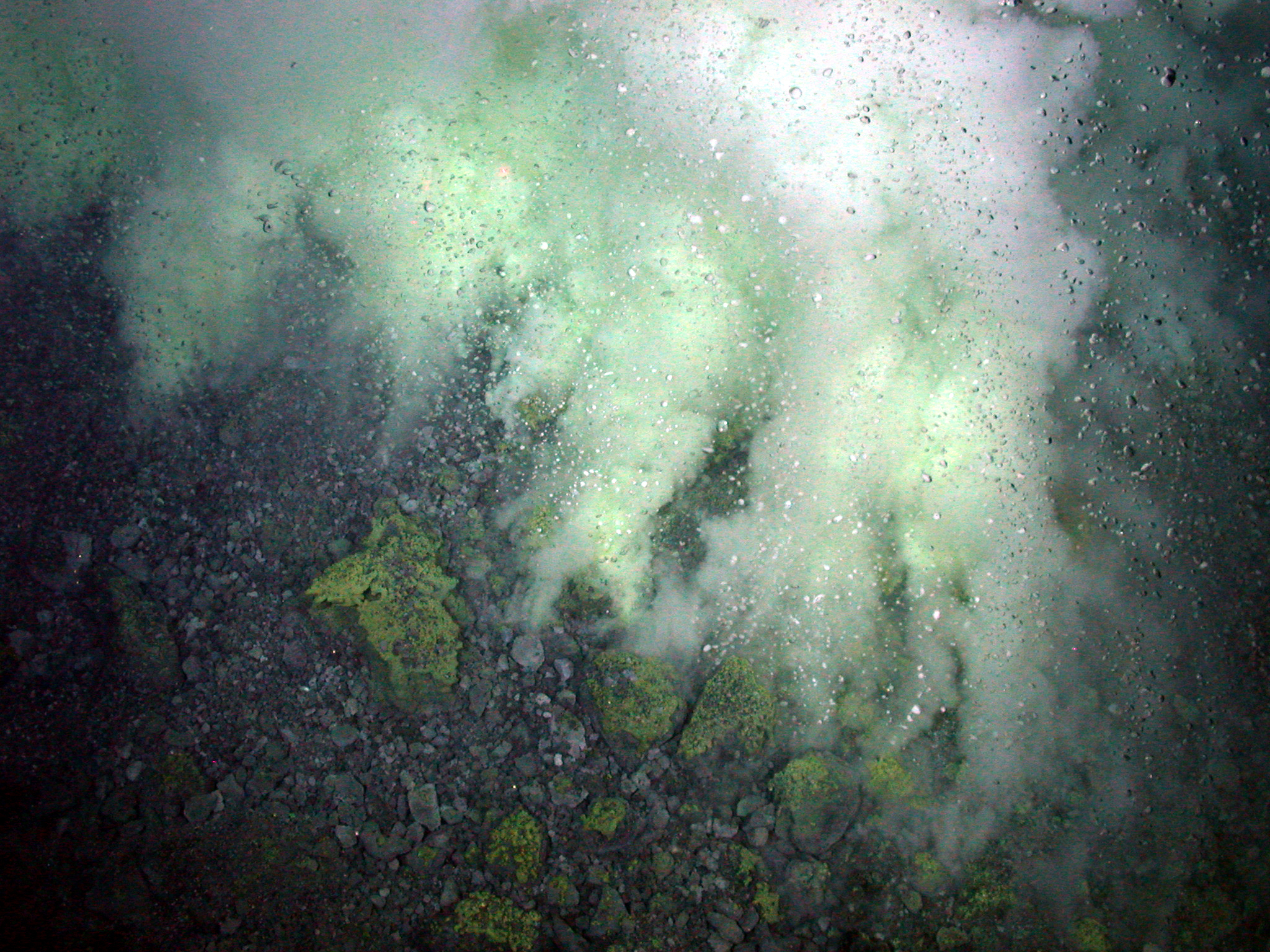
CO_{2} bubbles rising from NW Rota-1

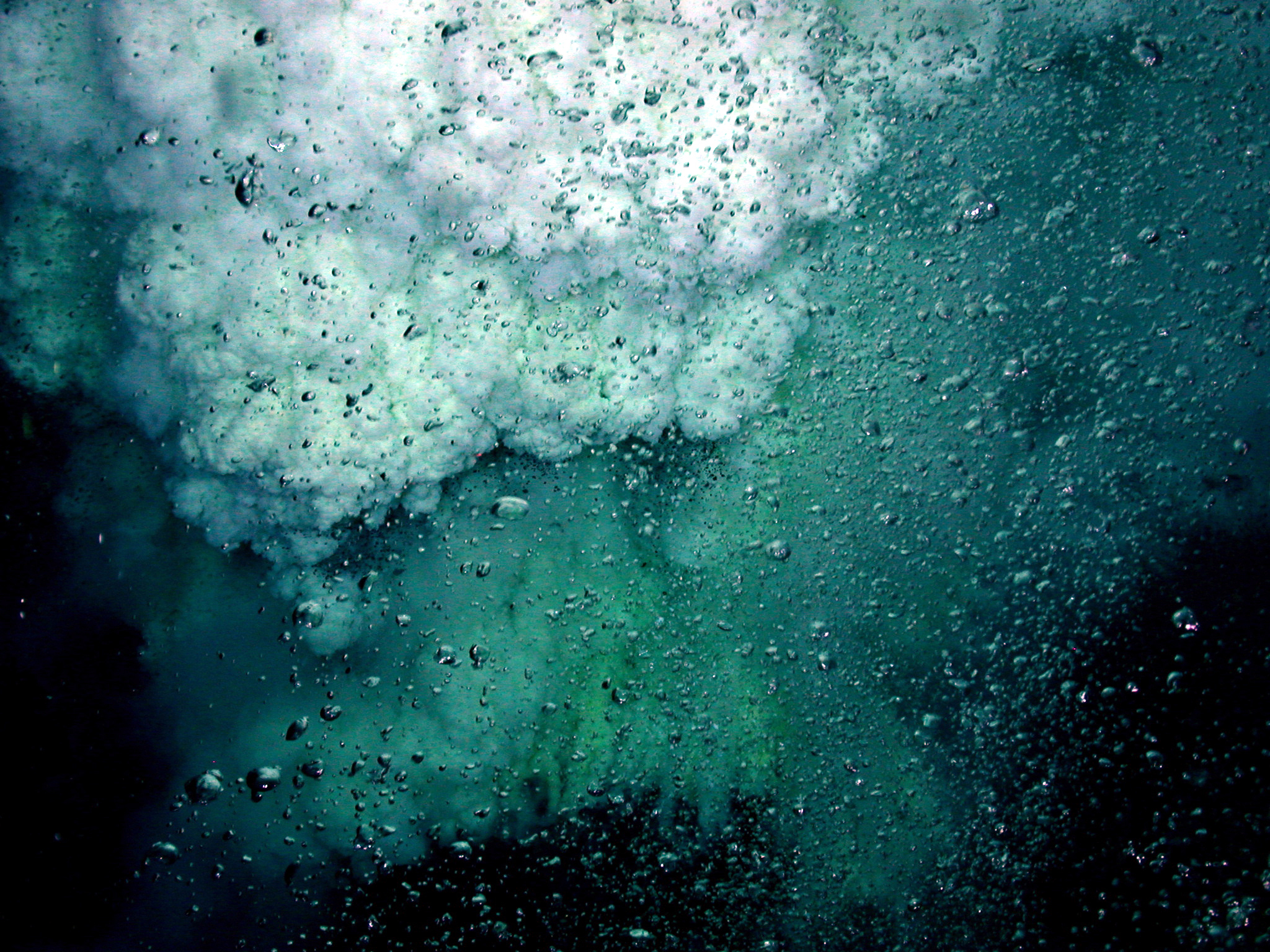
Bubbles of CO_{2} in the foreground; droplets of liquid sulfur rise in the background

NW Rota-1 also emits aluminium sulfate-phosphate such as alunite and woodhousite group minerals, iron oxyhydroxydes and sulfuric acid. It is the first volcano known to vent alunite minerals. These compounds appear to originate both through direct venting from the volcano, interactions with seawater and the interaction of the exhalations with the volcanic rocks.

=== Biology ===
Vents above Brimstone Pit and on the eastern ridge are covered with microbial mats and these in turn are frequented by animals such as copepods, crabs, limpets, polychaetes and shrimp. The microbial mats are chemoautotrophic. These animals feed not only on the microbial mats but also on other animals killed by the volcanic activity. There are no sessile animals other than rare limpets, presumably due to the intense volcanism and unstable conditions. A larger animal community has been found at the northwestern summit; it includes amphipods, anenomes, copepods, crabs, fish, isopods, jellyfish, ostracods and polychaetes.

The caridean shrimp Alvinocaris marimonte was discovered from populations on NW Rota-1, Myojin Knoll and NW Eifuku seamount. The animals found at NW Rota-1 and NW Eifuku have a distinct appearance. Other animals from NW Rota-1 are the limpet Shinkailepas sp., the copepods Ameira sp., Ameiropsis minor, Amphiascus minutus, Cyclopina sp., Halectinosoma angulifrons and Tisbe furcata, bresiliid shrimp Opaepele loihi, the crab Gandalfus yunohana and the polychaete Branchinotogluma sp..

The communities south of the summit were decimated by the 2009 landslide. The reduction of activity after 2010 allowed the communities to expand, and new species appeared.

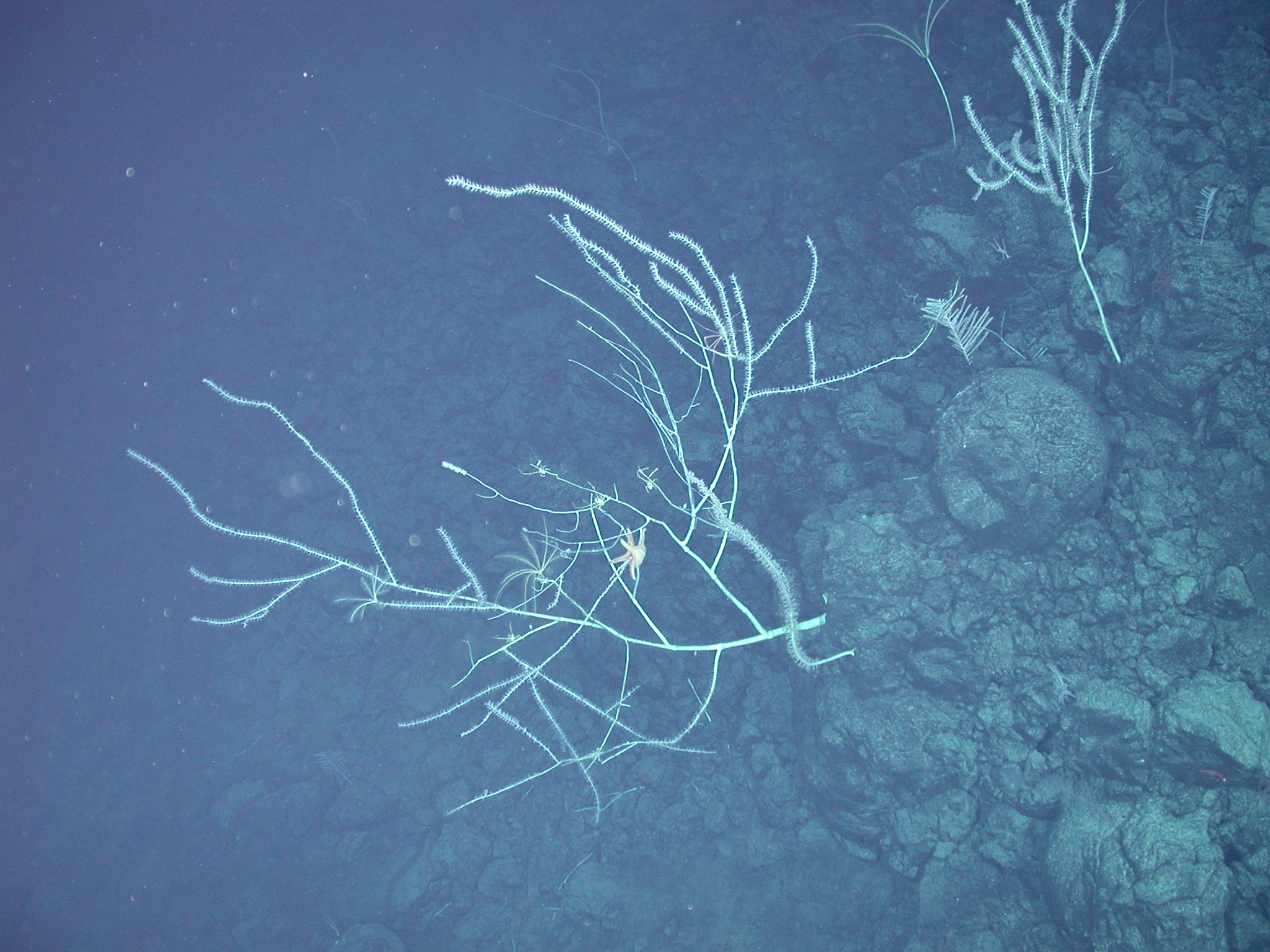
Animals around Brimstone Pit

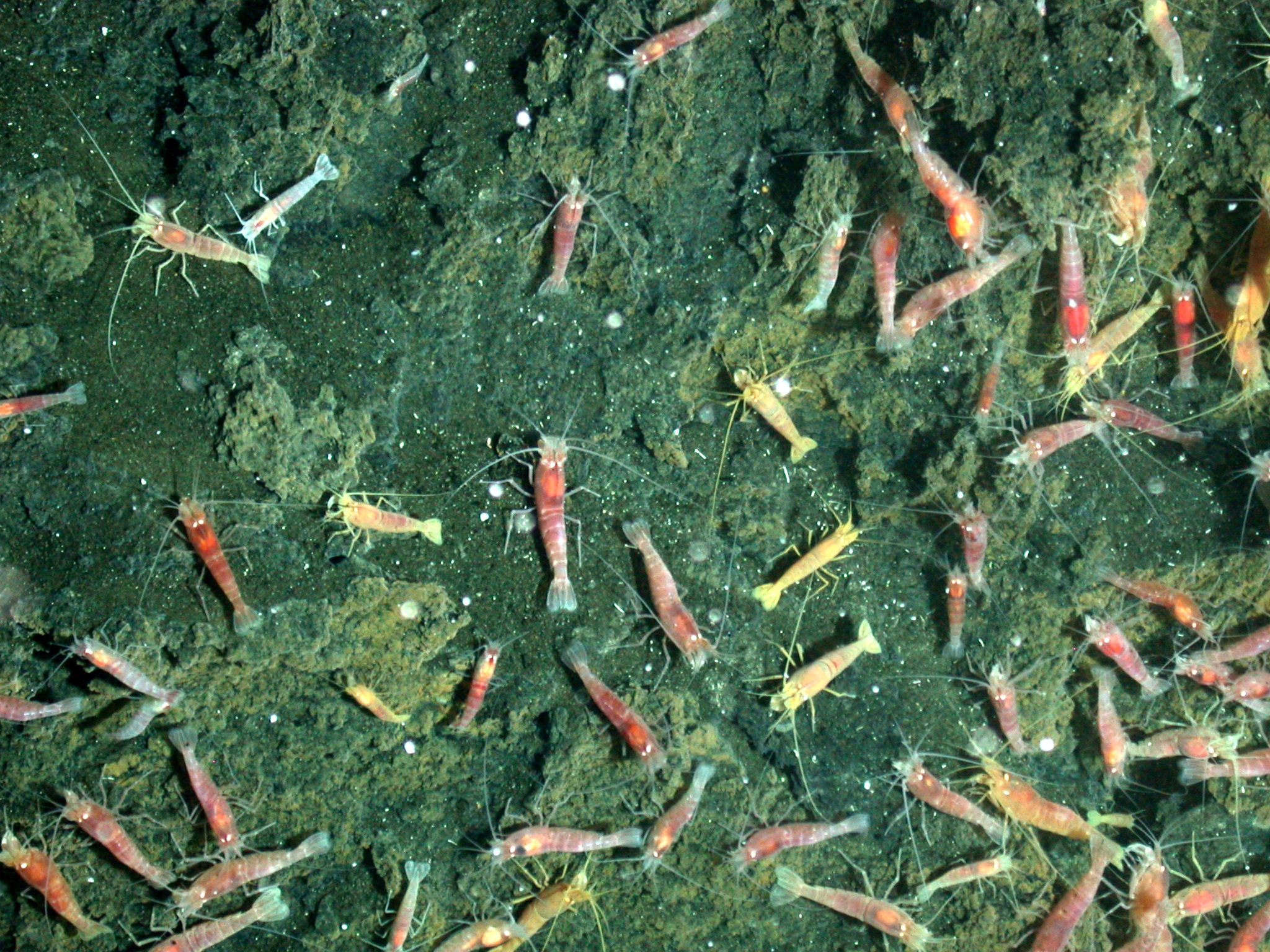
Shrimp at NW Rota-1

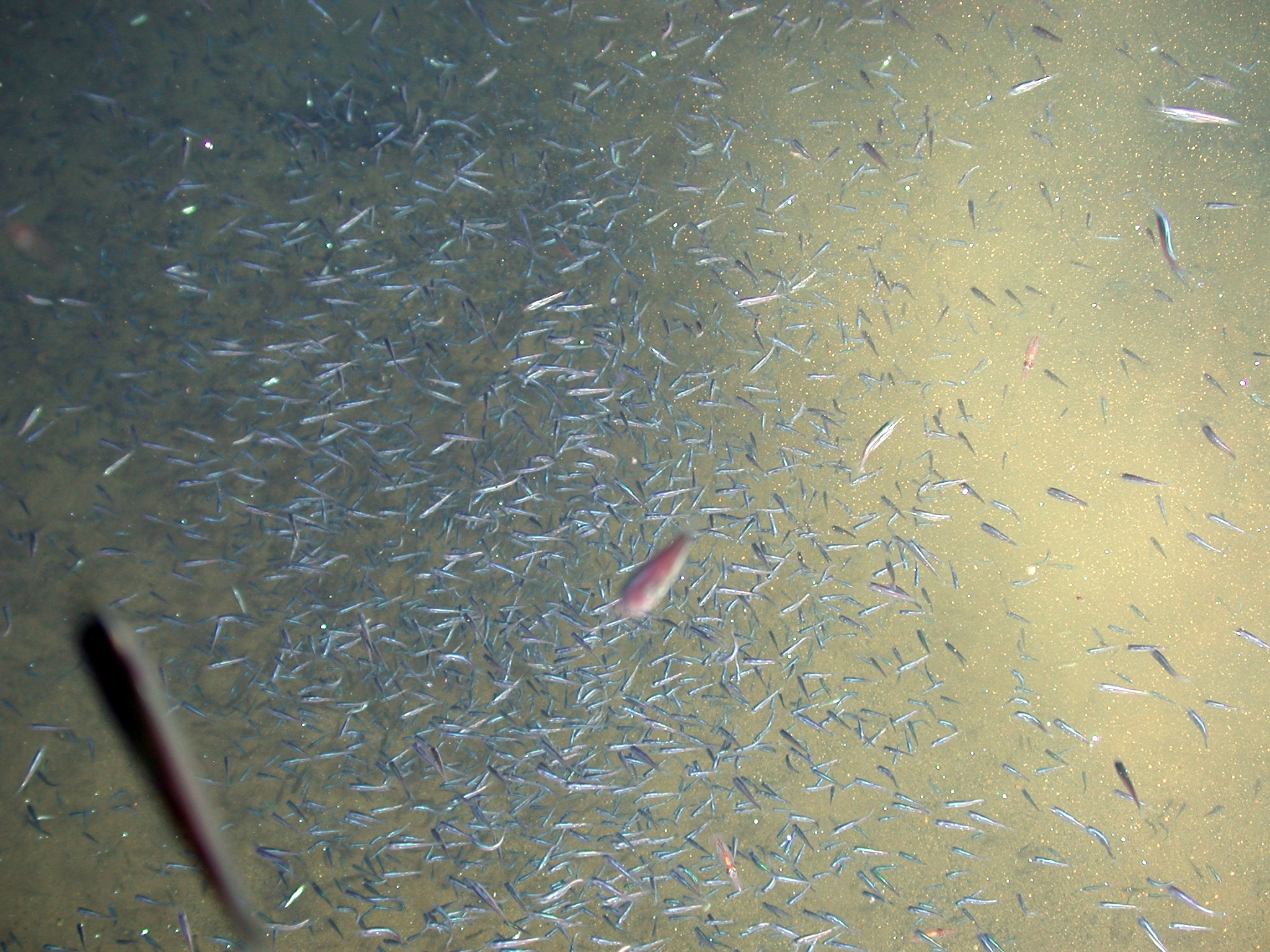
Fish swimming through a hydrothermal plume

== Eruption history and activity ==
The Brimstone Pit crater is probably a recent vent, given its small size. The rocky outcrops are older. The structure of the volcanic deposits suggests that long pauses between eruptions are rare at NW Rota-1.

Eruptions took place in 2004, 2005, 2006 – each of the eruptions occurred in a different physical context and with different characteristics – 2009 and 2010. Activity appears to be continuous but variable over this time and until 2014 - when a ROV dive found no activity - each dive to NW Rota-1 found the volcano in eruption:

- In March–April 2004, Brimstone Pit erupted bursts of ash and lapilli and a yellow plume containing droplets of liquid sulfur rose from the crater. Turbid plumes formed by volcanic glass spread at greater depths to distances of 7.5 miles (12 km); they were formed either as gravity flows of sediment or through mass wasting of eruption deposits around Brimstone Pit.
- In October 2005, eruptive activity could be seen from a closer distance and was similar to that in 2004. No turbid plumes were observed at depth, but mass flows were occurring around the crater.
- The April 2006 eruption, which was observed shortly after a collapse of the cinder cone, began as an effusive eruption from multiple vents and subsequently became explosive and focused on a single vent. Clouds of CO_{2} droplets were emitted prior to the extrusion of lava, which was itself accompanied by the emission of sulfur and ash. Turbid plumes similar to these in 2004 were observed again, initially obscuring the view of the seafloor. Presumably these plumes were caused by a collapse of the cinder cone.
- In 2009, the extrusion of lava was observed. It would slowly emerge from the vent, and blocks of lava would fragment and tumble down at the side of the vent. This process was accompanied by intense degassing, a yellowing of the plumes from sulfur and emission of tephra. A seismic swarm took place northwest of NW Rota-1 in April 2009 and was presumably caused by magma intrusion, which may relate to the subsequent eruption.
- In 2010 activity occurred at all five vents. Some vents undergoing mainly passive degassing and others mild explosive activity or a combination of the two patterns.

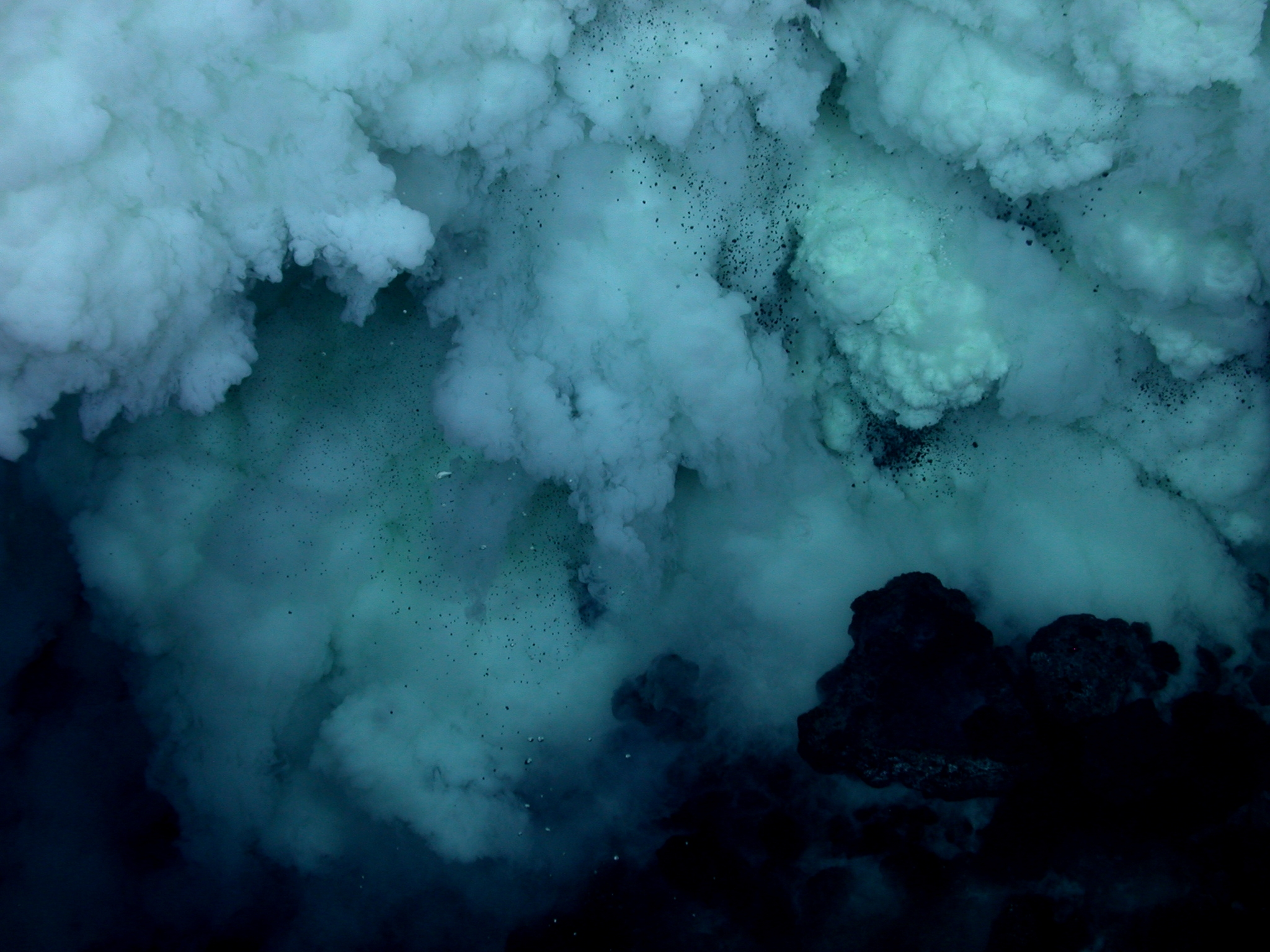
An eruption in 2006

The eruptions at Brimstone Pit resemble Strombolian eruptions on land, with a similar high gas flow and low magma supply. In such eruptions, each burst corresponds to the arrival of bubble-rich melt at the vent. The gas accumulates in the debris-blocked conduit and pressurizes it, until the pressure clears the blockage and a plume escapes. Volcanic bombs and debris are ejected during the eruptions and cover the slopes of the volcano.

Contact between seawater and magma causes brief steam explosions. This is followed by the abrupt condensation of the steam and the collapse of bubbles, which are recorded by hydrophones as pulsating sounds. Water-magma interaction also produces pyroclastics or alters them after they have been ejected. The eruptions appear to be part of a long-term eruption during which cones form and collapse at Brimstone Pit and water in the magma drives explosive bursts.

Eruptions at NW Rota-1 did not breach the surface and are unlikely to do so in the future. If not for fortuitous observations the activity of NW Rota-1 would not have been discovered.

=== Hydrophone records ===
In 2008 and 2009, hydrophones recorded a cyclical activity, with bursts of acoustic signals lasting one to several minutes separated by pauses less than a minute long. Each burst consisted of hundreds of pulses, each several tenths of a second long. An intense acoustic signal recorded between 12 and 16 August 2009 exhibited high amplitudes and low frequencies, with two distinct pulses on 14 August 2009. This signal has been interpreted as an intense explosive eruption which led to the landslide on 14 August 2009. After the landslide the volcano became acoustically quiet for some time before sound levels increased again. Between 2009 and 2010 hydrophones recorded numerous acoustic signals, reflecting the steady eruptions, and tremors which may originate in the magmatic conduit although most of the acoustic signals appear to come from the vent. Apart from an increased amplitude in the burst cycles, the acoustic signal in 2010 was similar to that of 2009.
