= Esmeralda Bank =

Submarine volcano

Coordinates: 15.00°N 145.25°E

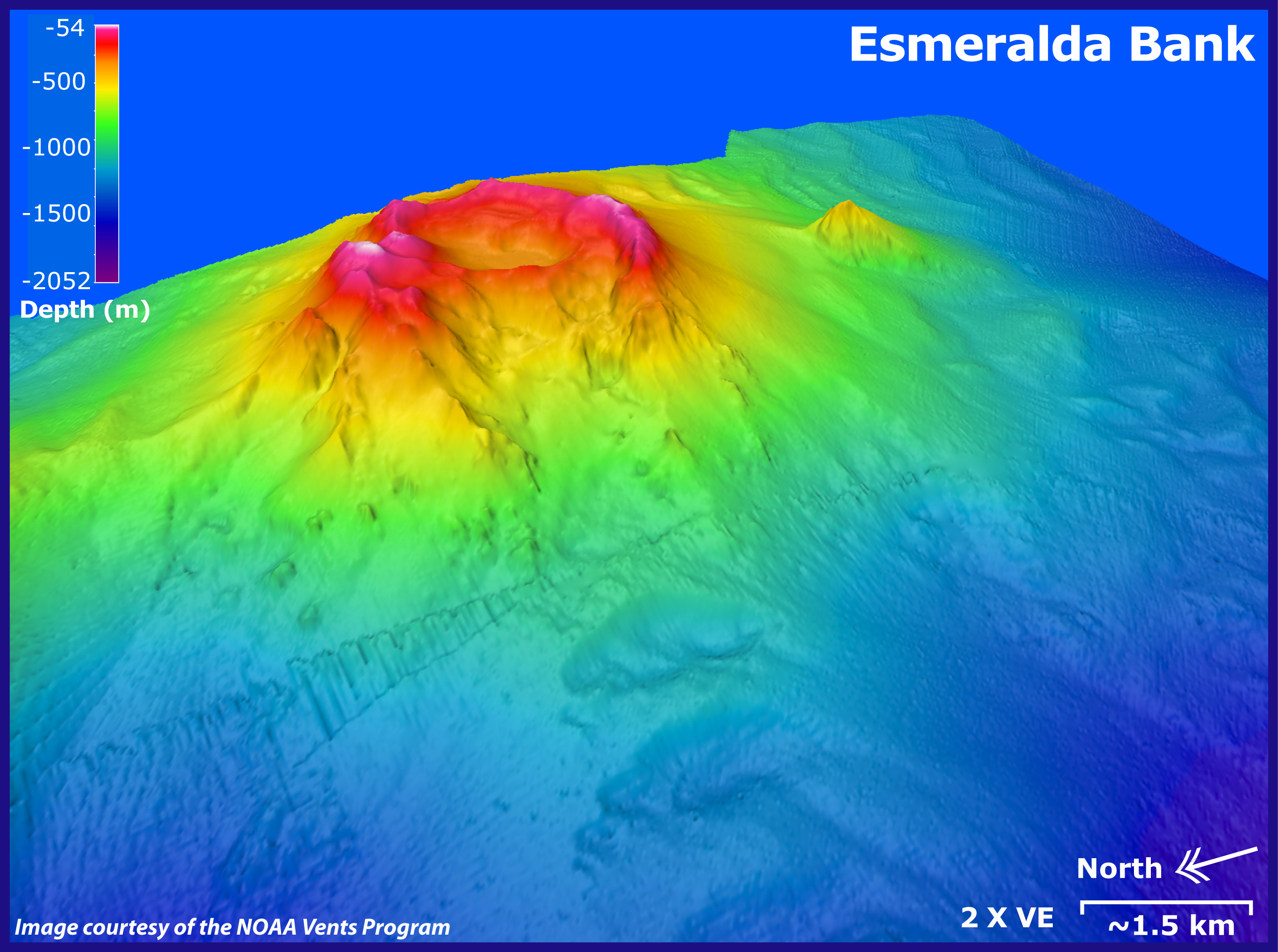
Esmeralda Bank

Esmeralda Bank is a submarine volcano around 37 km west of Tinian Island of the Northern Mariana Islands in the Pacific Ocean. It is located at the southern end of the Mariana Arc. It has three summit cones lying along a north–south line. The highest peak is about 43 meters below the sea surface and has a caldera about 3 kilometers wide and several parasitic cones on the edge of the caldera. Sulfur boils and water discoloration have been observed at the site of the volcano, attributed to either eruptions or fumarolic activity.

== Last Known Activity ==
On May 26, 1987, a pilot observed violently bubbling and discolored water over Esmeralda Bank.
