= Coleman Seamount =

Seamount in the Pacific Ocean

Coordinates: 8.841°S 157.160°E

Coleman Seamount is a submarine volcano in the western Solomon Islands. The volcano was discovered in 1985 by the Hawaiian "Moana Wave" research vessel.
