= Michael Kibblewhite =

English choral conductor

Michael Kibblewhite (1944-2023) was an English Choral conductor. He was educated at Magdalen College, Oxford where he was a boy chorister and soon after a Music and Choir scholar at Trinity College, Cambridge.

== Choirs ==
Kibblewhite founded and also directed a number of choirs in the south-east of England, including:

- Coro 94, which Kibblewhite founded in 2014. This chamber choir of 25-30 singers are currently active (as of 2020), and perform many concerts per year in the UK and in Europe. Coro 94 began as an 'alumni' group of Cantate Youth Choir. Its members are predominantly former singers with that award-winning youth choir. Coro 94 released an album called 'Allus' in late 2018.
- Cantate Youth Choir, which Kibblewhite founded in 1994,
- Cambridge Chorale, also founded by Kibblewhite in 1994;
- English Festival Voices,
- Harlow Boy's Choir, which Kibblewhite founded and conducted until 1993.
- Harlow Chorus, which Kibblewhite founded in 1975,
- Hertfordshire Chorus, which Kibblewhite founded in 1977
- High Voices
- North-East London Polytechnic (NELP) Chorus, now East London Chorus, founded by Kibblewhite in 1971
- King's Lynn Festival Chorus of which Kibblewhite was Musical Director 2001-2009
