= Mehetiʻa =

Island in French Polynesia

Mehetia
Native name: Mehetiʻa
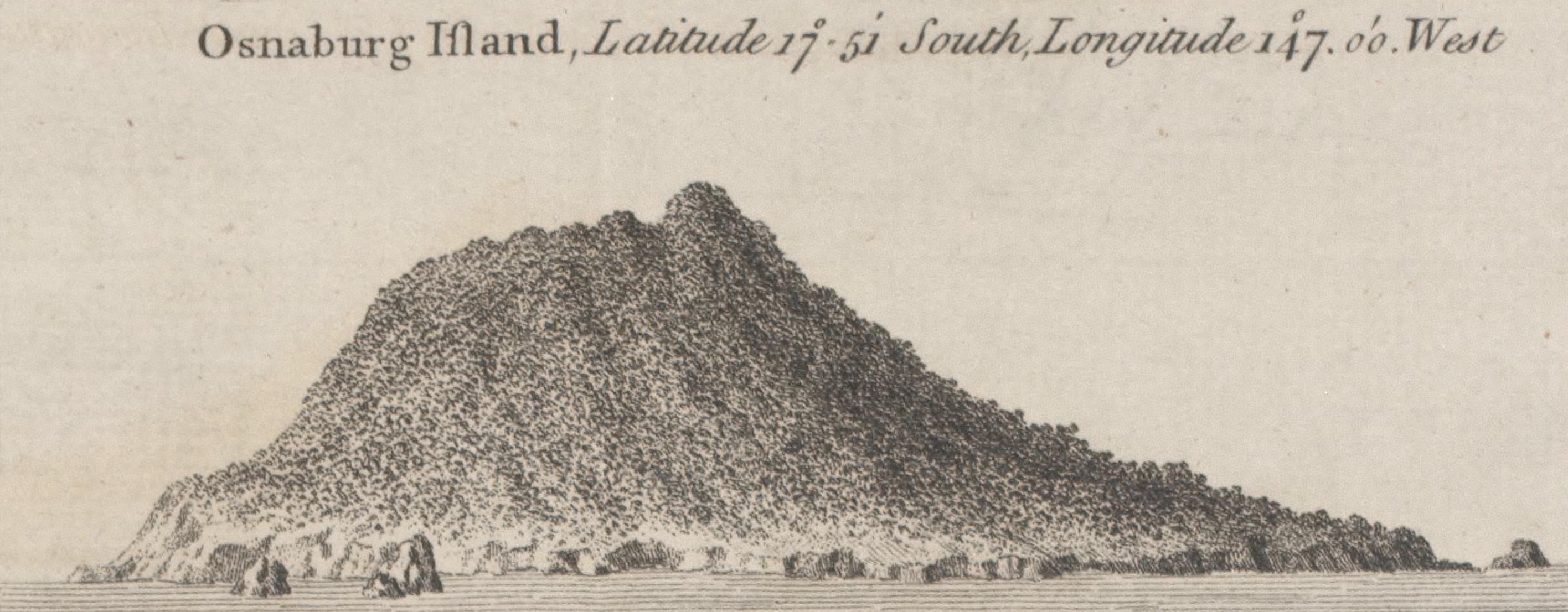
- Coastal view of Osnaburg Island, now Mehetia

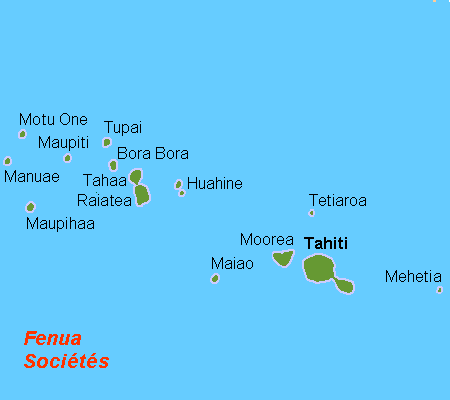

Geography
- Location: Pacific Ocean
- Coordinates: 17°52′S 148°04′W
- Archipelago: Society Islands
- Total islands: 1
- Major islands: Mehetia
- Area: 2.3 km^{2} (0.89 sq mi)
- Highest elevation: 435 m (1427 ft)
- Highest point: Mont Fareura

Administration
- France
- Overseas collectivity: French Polynesia
- Administrative subdivision: Windward Islands
- Commune: Taiarapu-Est

Demographics
- Population: uninhabited

Mont Fareura
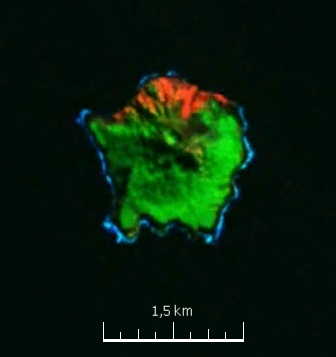
- NASA Geocover 2000 image

Highest point
- Elevation: 435 m (1,427 ft)
- Prominence: 435 m (1,427 ft)
- Coordinates: 17°52′S 148°4′W

Geography
- Location: Society Islands

Geology
- Mountain type: Stratovolcano
- Last eruption: Unknown

Mehetiʻa or Meʻetiʻa is a volcanic island in the Windward Islands, in the east of the Society Islands in French Polynesia. It is a very young active stratovolcano 110 kilometres (68 mi) east of the Taiarapu Peninsula of Tahiti. It is associated with the Teahitiʻa-Mehetia hotspot, and the South Pacific superswell.

The island has an area of 2.3 square kilometres (0.89 sq mi) and its highest point is 435 metres (1,427 ft). The peak is a well-defined volcanic crater. In 1981 the island was the centre of earthquakes.

== History ==
Tahitian oral tradition holds that navigators stopped at Mehitiʻa, which was regarded as sacred, on their long voyage to New Zealand. This oral history correlates with geological evidence found in southern New Zealand which can be traced back to Mehitiʻa.

The early Polynesian voyagers commonly gave Polynesian ancestral names and symbolism to new places. The high point of Mehetia is Mount Hiurai (Hi’ura’i/Hikurangi) The name Hikurangi in Aotearoa / New Zealand probably came from Mehetia and the name Hi’ura’i probably has its origin in Siʻulagi (Siʻulangi) in Taʻu, Samoa.

The first European sighting was by the Spanish expedition of Pedro Fernández de Quirós on 9 February 1606, that charted it as Decena (ten in Spanish). Later on it was sighted by Samuel Wallis in HMS Dolphin 1767 and Louis Antoine de Bougainville in 1768. It was also sighted by Spanish navigator Domingo de Boenechea on November 6, 1772, on ship Aguila. He named this island San Cristóbal.

== Administration ==
Mehetiʻa is administratively part of the commune (municipality) of Taiarapu-Est and of its easternmost commune associée Tautira. The island is uninhabited and does not have much vegetation but has a small coral reef on the underwater slopes.

== See also ==
- List of volcanoes in French Polynesia
