= Eifuku =

Two volcanic seamounts in the Northern Marianas

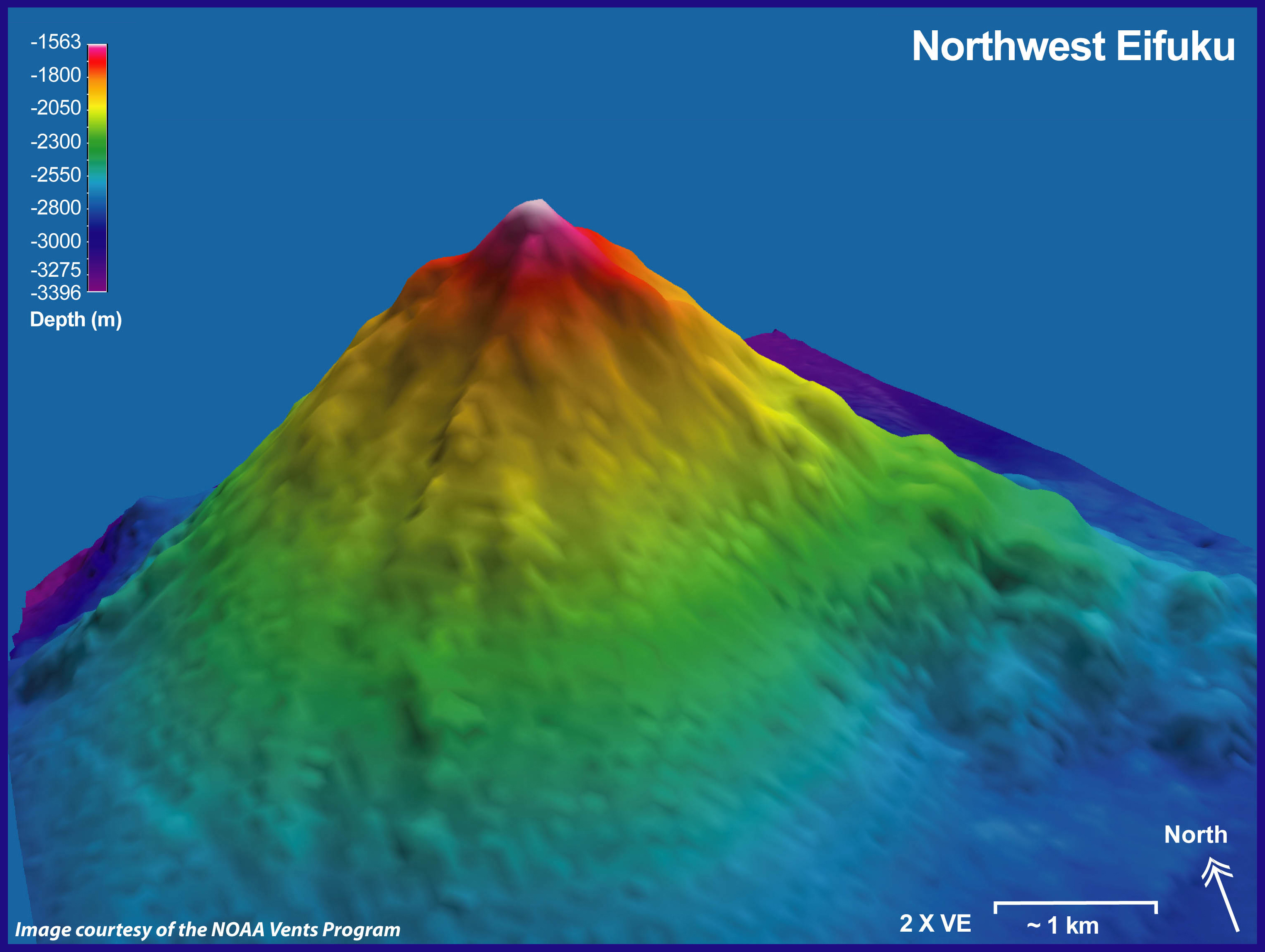
- Bathymetic image of NW Eifuku as viewed to the northeast

- Location within North Pacific

Location
- Coordinates: 21.485°N 144.043°E

Eifuku (Japanese: 永福) and NW Eifuku (北西永福) are two seamounts in the Pacific Ocean. The better known one is NW Eifuku, where an unusual hydrothermal vent called "Champagne" produced droplets of liquid CO_{2}. Both seamounts are located in the Northern Marianas and are volcanoes, part of the Izu-Bonin-Mariana Arc. NW Eifuku rises to 1,535 metres (5,036 ft) depth below sea level and is a 9 kilometres (5.6 mi) wide volcanic cone.

Both Eifuku seamounts are hydrothermally active, with numerous vent sites found on NW Eifuku including the "Champagne" vent site, where there are a number of white smokers. Diverse ecosystems dominated by mussels live in proximity and around the hydrothermal vent sites.

== Geography and geology ==
The Eifuku seamounts are located northwest of Farallon de Pajaros island in the Northern Marianas. Geologically, both Eifuku seamounts are part of the Northern Marianas volcanic arc and are grouped within the Northern Seamount Province. The Northern Marianas are part of the c. 2,500-kilometre (1,600 mi) Izu-Bonin-Mariana Arc between Japan and Guam, which owes its existence to the subduction of the Pacific Plate underneath the Philippine Plate that began in the Eocene. About 40 submarine and island volcanoes make up the Northern Marianas arc.

NW Eifuku and Eifuku are small volcanoes at the northwestern end of a volcano chain that also includes Daikoku; NW Eifuku is the smallest of these. Daikoku also features hydrothermal venting and has been considered a twin cone with Eifuku. Eifuku proper is composed of boulders, dykes and lava domes. The occurrence of volcanic breccia, hydrothermal muds, sandstone and sulfides has been reported but without a clear attribution to either Eifuku or NW Eifuku.

NW Eifuku seamount rises to 1,535 metres (5,036 ft) depth below sea level and has a roughly conical outline, with a basal width of 9 kilometres (5.6 mi). Its summit is formed by a lava dome that is surrounded by jagged rocks. A ridge, which likely corresponds to a dyke in the crater, runs from the summit and features old and mostly inactive hydrothermal vents. Rocks with columnar joints, lava spines and pillow basalts are found in the summit region. The southwestern slope of NW Eifuku and its summit are cut by the scar of a sector collapse. A northwest-southeast trending fracture may underlie the seamount and could be responsible for the mass wasting observed on the seamount. The venting at "Champagne" appears to indicate that there is degassing magma.

=== Composition ===
Rocks erupted by Eifuku range from basalt to andesite that define either a potassium-rich calc-alkaline or a tholeiitic suite. The basalts contain clinopyroxene, olivine and plagioclase and feature abundant vesicles despite the great depth of the volcano. This composition may occur on either NW Eifuku or Eifuku or both seamounts. Sulfur mineralizations exist in the form of crusts, large deposits and also as infill within other rocks. Silica and iron oxides form fluffy sediments.

== Hydrothermal vents ==
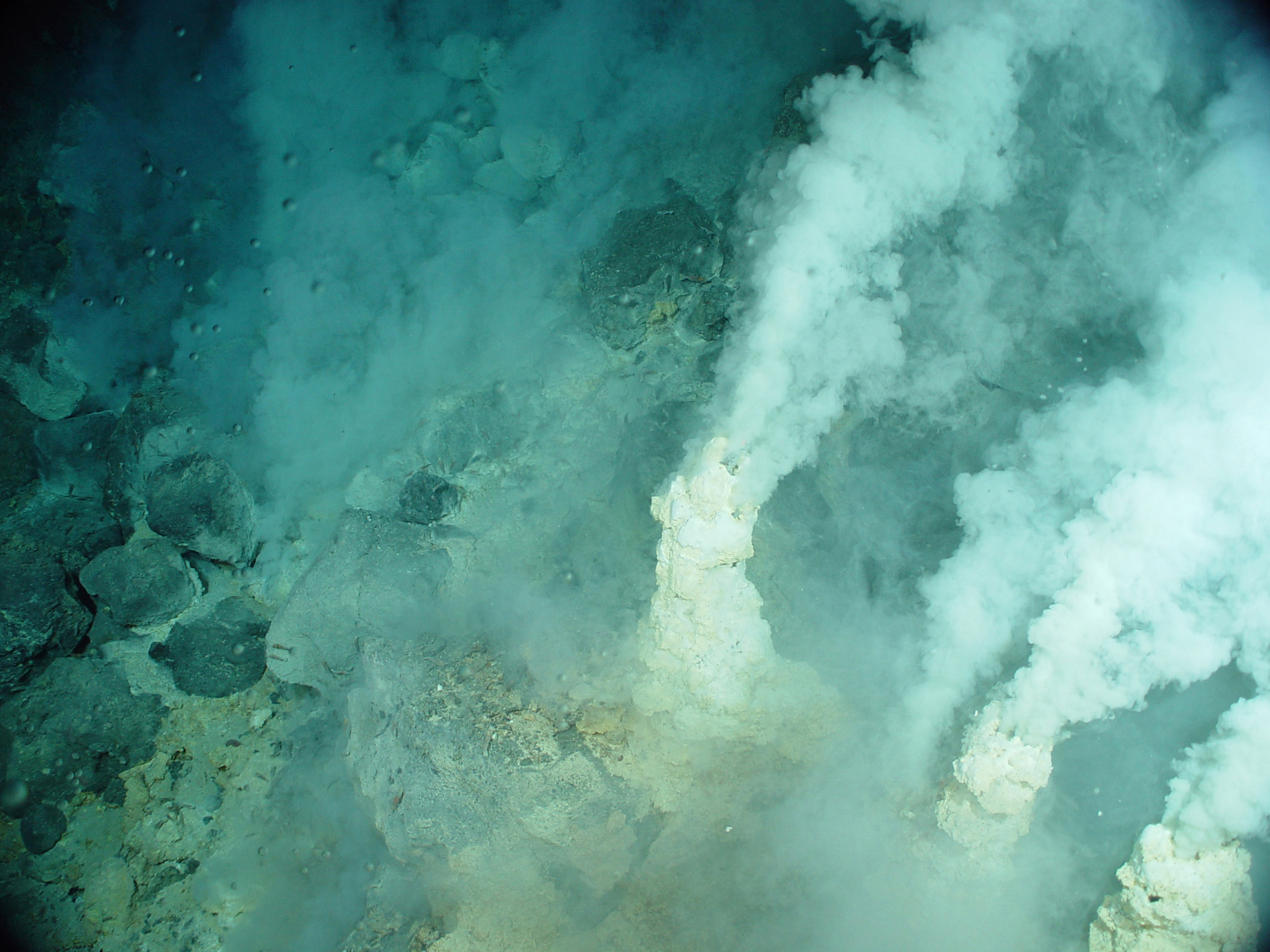
Chimneys and white smokers on Eifuku

Both Eifuku and NW Eifuku are hydrothermally active, with NW Eifuku displaying white smokers and hydrothermal vents dispersed over several sites on the volcano. There are several sites, including diffuse venting at the summit, a low-temperature area at 1,570 metres (5,150 ft) depth and high-temperature vents at 1,610 metres (5,280 ft) depth which include the so-called "Champagne" site about 80 metres (260 ft) west-northwest of the summit. Two other vent sites northeast and north of "Champagne" are known as "Cliff House" and "Sulfur Dendrite", respectively. Additional vents are "Yellow Cone" and "Yellow Top" which are low-temperature iron-rich vents and the latter of which is located south of the summit. A sixth vent site is known as "Bacto Balls". There are anecdotal reports of liquid sulfur. The seawater above NW Eifuku has anomalous composition, a sign of hydrothermal degassing.

=== Champagne vent ===
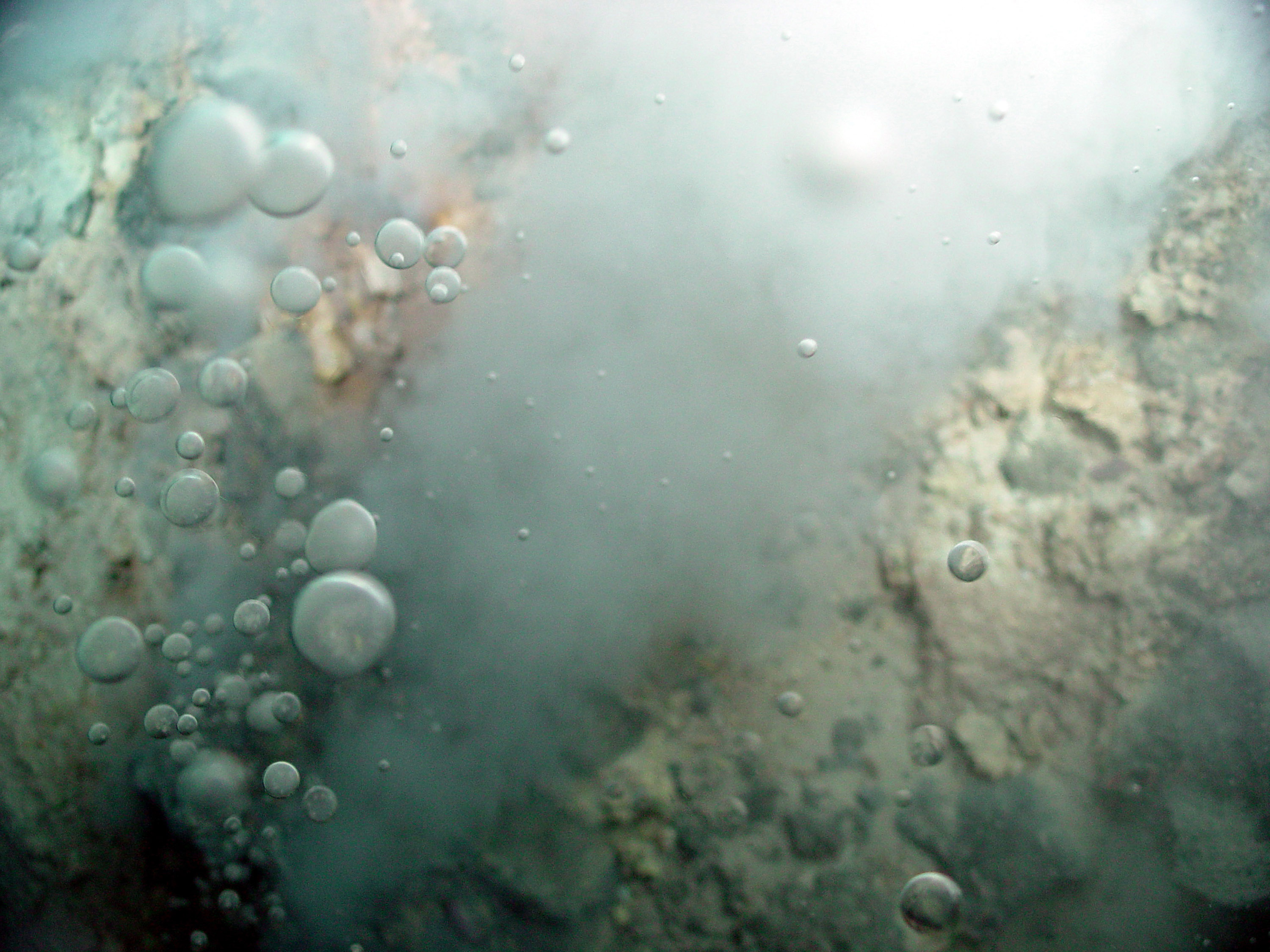
Carbon dioxide bubbles rising from Eifuku volcano

The "Champagne" vent was discovered either in 2004 by the ROPOS remotely operated vehicle (ROV) or by a NOAA expedition in 2003. (Note: Authors of a 2016 NOAA report into Eifuku say they are not aware of any previous ROV dive.) It lies west of the summit in the sector collapse scar and features both focused (white smokers that form chimneys) and diffuse venting. Temperatures of the discharge reach 105 °C (221 °F) in gas-rich fluids that contain H_{2}S. The chimneys are formed by sulfur.

"Champagne" is known for being one of only three sites on Earth (Note: Two other sites are in the Okinawa Trough and additional reports come from Vailulu'u seamount and North Su in the Manus Basin.) where liquid CO_{2} is emitted. The CO_{2} rises from the pumice and sulfur deposits on the ground through crevices, and it forms cold droplets with a milky skin that stick to surfaces such as ROV tools. The bubbles do not merge and their discharge increases when the seafloor is disturbed by a ROV. They ascend slowly owing to their buoyancy under the conditions at the vent. They appear to originate from a layer underneath the ground surface, as disturbing the vent leads to increasing exhalations. The name "Champagne" is based on the appearance of the exhalations.

Apart from CO_{2}, they contain sulfur compounds and small amounts of hydrogen and methane. CO_{2} makes up about 87% of the droplets, which are rimmed by CO_{2} clathrates, the concentrations per unit mass are about twice the solubility of CO_{2} under the environmental conditions and considerably larger than at other known CO_{2} venting sites. Eifuku's CO_{2} output appears to be a significant component of global volcanic CO_{2} flux, or at least of submarine volcanic CO_{2} flux. Based on isotope ratios, much of this CO_{2} is derived from the subduction of carbonates rather than from the mantle. The emission rate may not be steady over time, as output varied between different expeditions.

== Biology ==
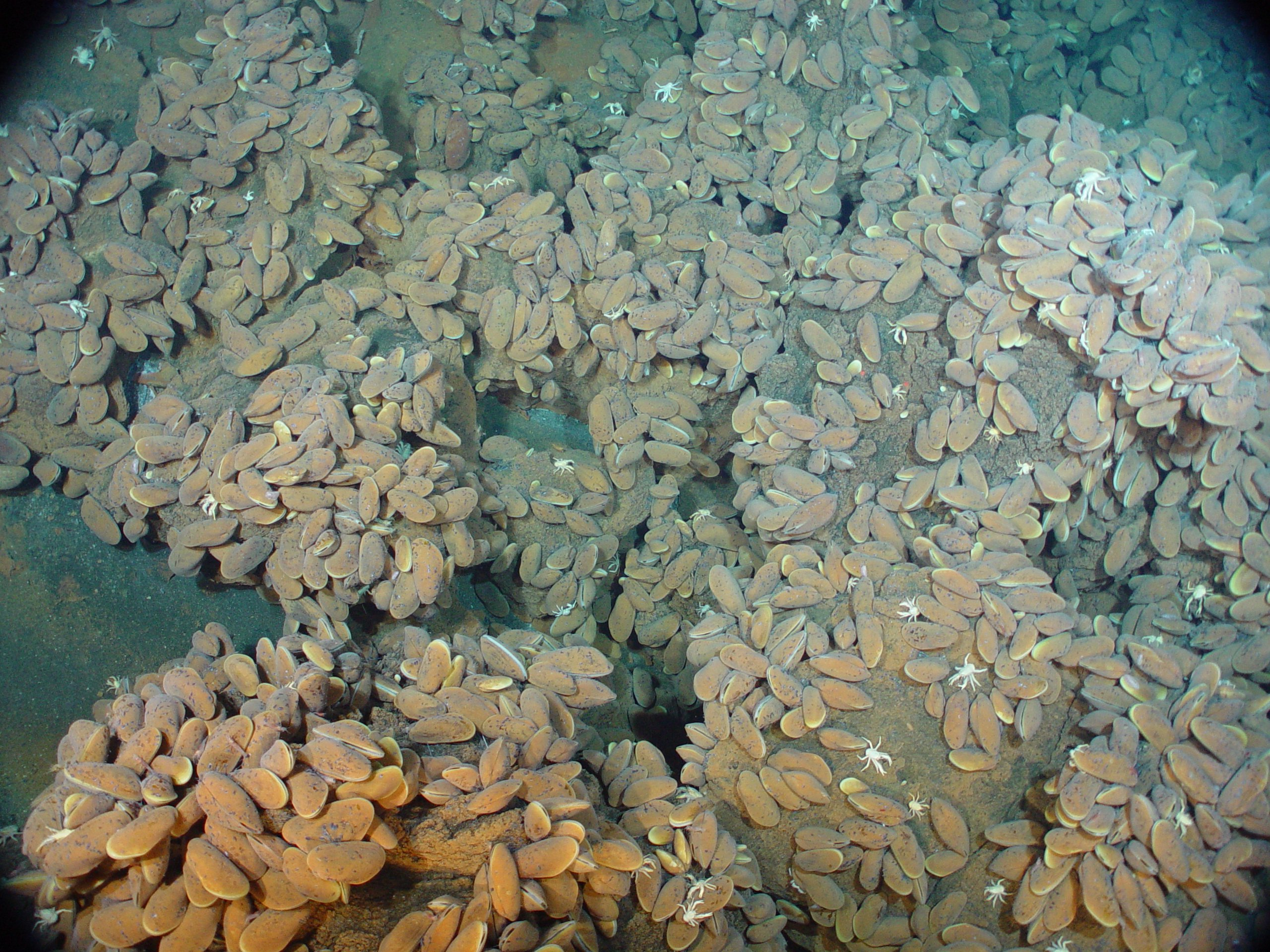
Mussel beds at Eifuku volcano

Several ecological communities have been found at NW Eifuku, at 1,550 metres (5,090 ft) depth and with distinct microbiotas:

- The "Champagne" site features chemobiosynthetic organisms. Microbial mats lie between the vents. Animals are not frequent here. The shrimp Opaepele loihi is the most important animal species and is accompanied by galatheid crabs, scale worms and vent gastropods. (Note: Including a species discovered on Eifuku at the "Golden Lips" and "Champagne" sites, Provanna exquisita.) The animals feed mainly at the edges of the mats, where environmental conditions are not as extreme.
- A site called "Mussel bed" is covered with mussels of the Bathymodiolus genus, which cover an area of about 10,000 square metres (110,000 sq ft) with densities of more than 100 mussels per 1 square metre (11 sq ft). Other animals there include harpacticoid copepods, bythograeid and galatheid (Note: Including a species discovered at Eifuku and Myojin Knoll, Munidopsis myojinensis.) crabs, nematodes, polynoid and other polychaetes and alvinocarid (Note: Including a species discovered at Eifuku and Myojin Knoll, Alvinocaris marimonte, and Rimicaris cambonae discovered at Eifuku.) shrimps. This site is awash with hydrothermal discharges from the "Champagne" site, which lies at slightly greater depth. The mussels appear to feed on H_{2}S transported to the beds by water currents. It appears to be a more diverse ecosystem than the other two sites and has been stable over years.
- "Top Tower" is a 1–2 metres (3 ft 3 in – 6 ft 7 in) high pile of talus that exhales hydrothermal fluids. It features occasional microbial mats and the sporadic animals are harpacticoid copepods, galatheid crabs, nematodes, polychaetes and scale worms.

The properties of exhaled fluids strongly influence the ecosystems surrounding hydrothermal vents, and the environment of NW Eifuku has been used as an example for an ecosystem under heavy CO_{2} concentrations. Compared to other hydrothermal vent sites in the Pacific Ocean, mussels at NW Eifuku grow more slowly and have eroded shells, but they also are less subject to predation by crabs and their body condition is not uniformly inferior.

Orange coloured microbial mats are widespread on Eifuku's summit region and around the vents. Barnacles, bivalves, nudibranchs, octocorals including bamboo corals, sea stars and sponges occur on Eifuku seamount. The fish species Randall's snapper and an unidentified species of the fish genus Grammatonotus were observed on Eifuku.
