= Teahitiʻa =

Submarine volcano northeast of the southeast tip of Tahiti in the Society Islands

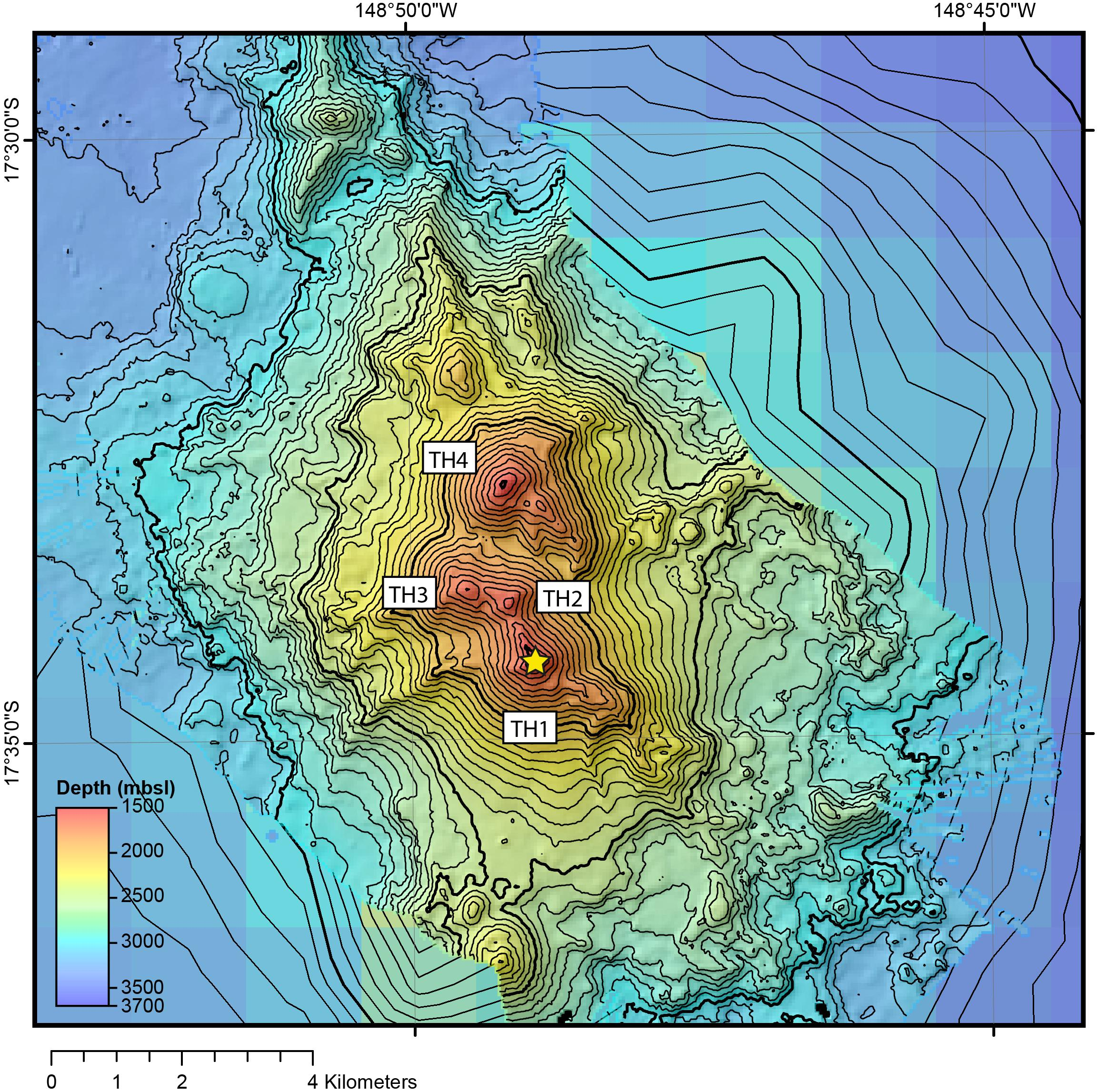
- Map of the Teahitiʻa Seamount

Highest point
- Elevation: −1,450 m (−4,760 ft)
- Coordinates: 17.57°S 148.85°W

Geography
- Location: French Polynesia

Geology
- Mountain type: Submarine volcano
- Volcanic zone: Society hotspot
- Last eruption: 10 January 1985 - 25 January 1985

Teahitiʻa ("Standing Fire") is a submarine volcano, located 40 km (25 mi) northeast of the southeast tip of Tahiti of the Society Islands in the Pacific Ocean, with its peak 1450 meters below the water surface. It belongs to the Society hotspot which is associated at this point in time with the South Pacific superswell. Teahitiʻa's last eruption occurred in 1985.

The seamount has four prominent cones. Submersible dives in 1986 and 1989 found two active hydrothermal fields on the volcano's flanks. A further dive in 2013 found ongoing hydrothermal venting.

Earthquake swarms in March 1982, July 1983, December 1983, and January 1985 have been associated with submarine eruptions. On 16 March 2008 Teahitiʻa was the epicentre of an earthquake measuring 3.2 on the Richter scale. The weak tremor was felt in Tahiti, causing the beginnings of panic in the population unaccustomed to these seismic phenomena and fearing a tidal wave.
