= Submarine volcano =

Underwater vents or fissures in the Earth's surface from which magma can erupt

Scheme of a submarine eruption.: 1. Water vapor cloud; 2. Water; 3. Stratum; 4. Lava flow; 5. Magma conduit; 6. Magma chamber; 7. Dike; 8. Pillow lava

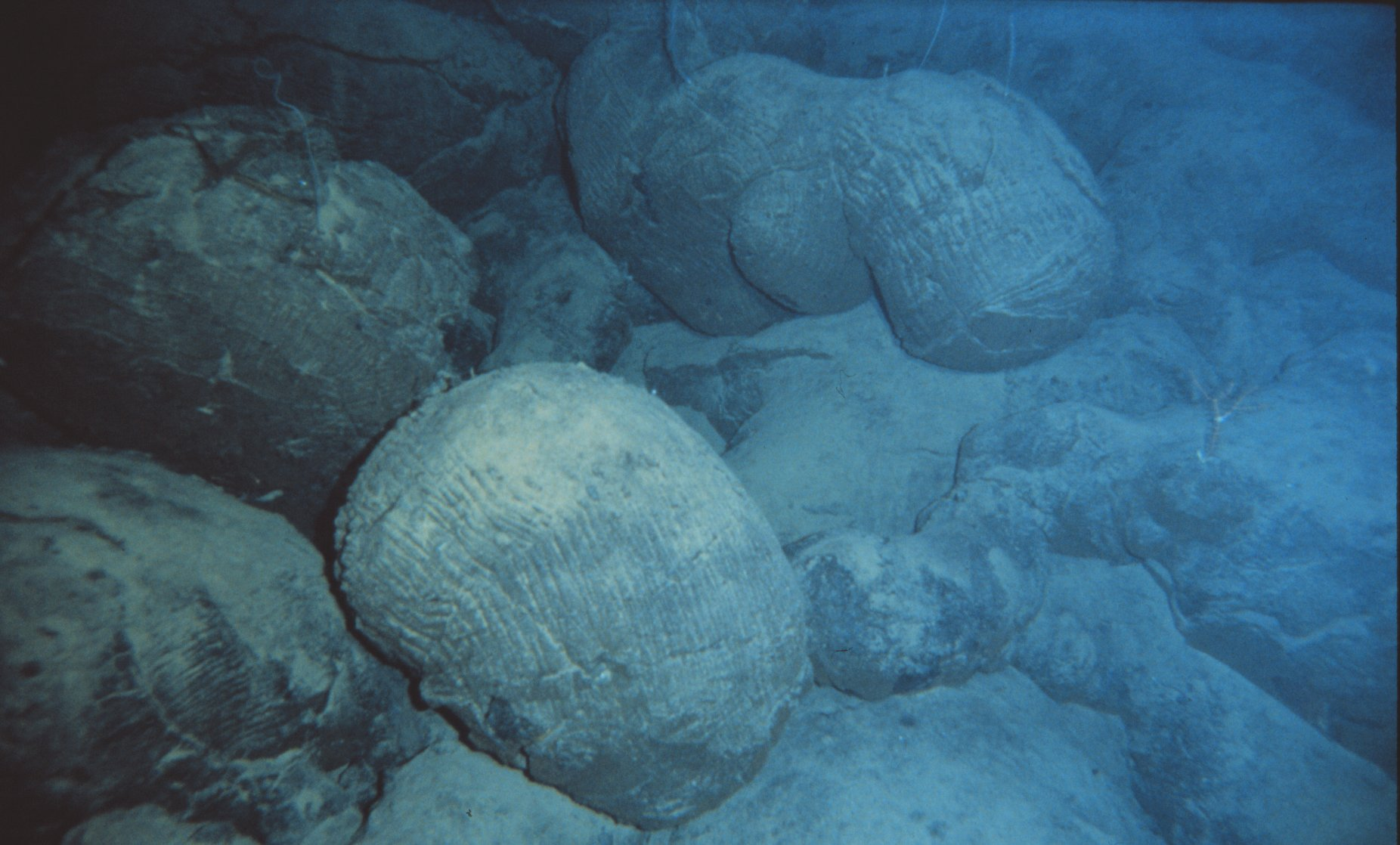
Pillow lava formed by a submarine volcano

NOAA exploration video showing remnants of underwater tar volcanoes.

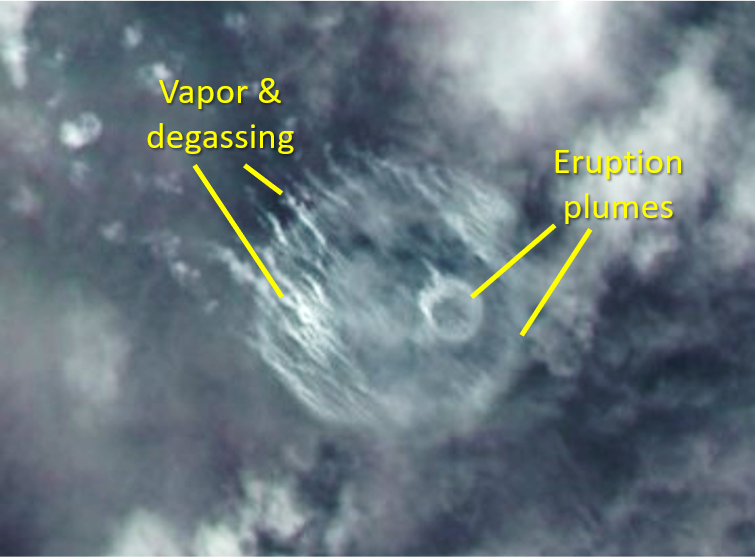
Circular plumes from a submarine eruption near Tonga

Submarine volcanoes are underwater vents or fissures in the Earth's surface from which magma can erupt. Many submarine volcanoes are located near areas of tectonic plate formation, known as mid-ocean ridges. The volcanoes at mid-ocean ridges alone are estimated to account for 75% of the magma output on Earth. Although most submarine volcanoes are located in the depths of seas and oceans, some also exist in shallow water, and these can discharge material into the atmosphere during an eruption. The total number of submarine volcanoes is estimated to be over one million (most are now extinct) of which some 75,000 rise more than 1 kilometre (0.62 miles) above the seabed. Only 119 submarine volcanoes in Earth's oceans and seas are known to have erupted during the last 11,700 years.

Hydrothermal vents, sites of abundant biological activity, are commonly found near submarine volcanoes.

== Seamounts ==
Many submarine volcanoes are seamounts, typically extinct volcanoes that rise abruptly from a seafloor of 1,000 metres (3,300 ft) - 4,000 metres (13,000 ft) depth. They are defined by oceanographers as independent features that rise to at least 1,000 metres (3,300 ft) above the seafloor. The peaks are often found hundreds to thousands of meters below the surface, and are therefore considered to be within the deep sea. An estimated 30,000 seamounts occur across the globe, with only a few having been studied.

However, some seamounts are also unusual. For example, while the summits of seamounts are normally hundreds of meters below sea level, the Bowie Seamount in Canada's Pacific waters rises from a depth of about 3,000 metres (9,800 ft) to within 24 metres (79 ft) of the sea surface.

== Effect of water on volcanoes ==
The presence of water can greatly alter the characteristics of a volcanic eruption and the explosions of underwater volcanoes in comparison to those on land.

For instance, water causes magma to cool and solidify much more quickly than in a terrestrial eruption, often turning it into volcanic glass. The shapes and textures of lava formed by submarine volcanoes are different from lava erupted on land. Upon contact with water, a solid crust forms around the lava. Advancing lava flows into this crust, forming what is known as pillow lava.

Below ocean depths of about 2,200 metres (7,200 ft) where the pressure exceeds the critical pressure of water (22.06 MPa or about 218 atmospheres for pure water), it can no longer boil; it becomes a supercritical fluid. Without boiling sounds, deep-sea volcanoes can be difficult to detect at great distances using hydrophones.

The critical temperature and pressure increase in solutions of salts, which are normally present in seawater. The composition of aqueous solution in the vicinity of hot basalt, and circulating within the conduits of hot rocks, is expected to differ from that of bulk water (i.e., of sea water away from the hot surfaces). One estimation is that the critical point is 407 °C (765 °F) and 29.9 MPa, while the solution composition corresponds to that of approximately 3.2% NaCl.

== Identifying types of eruptions by sounds ==
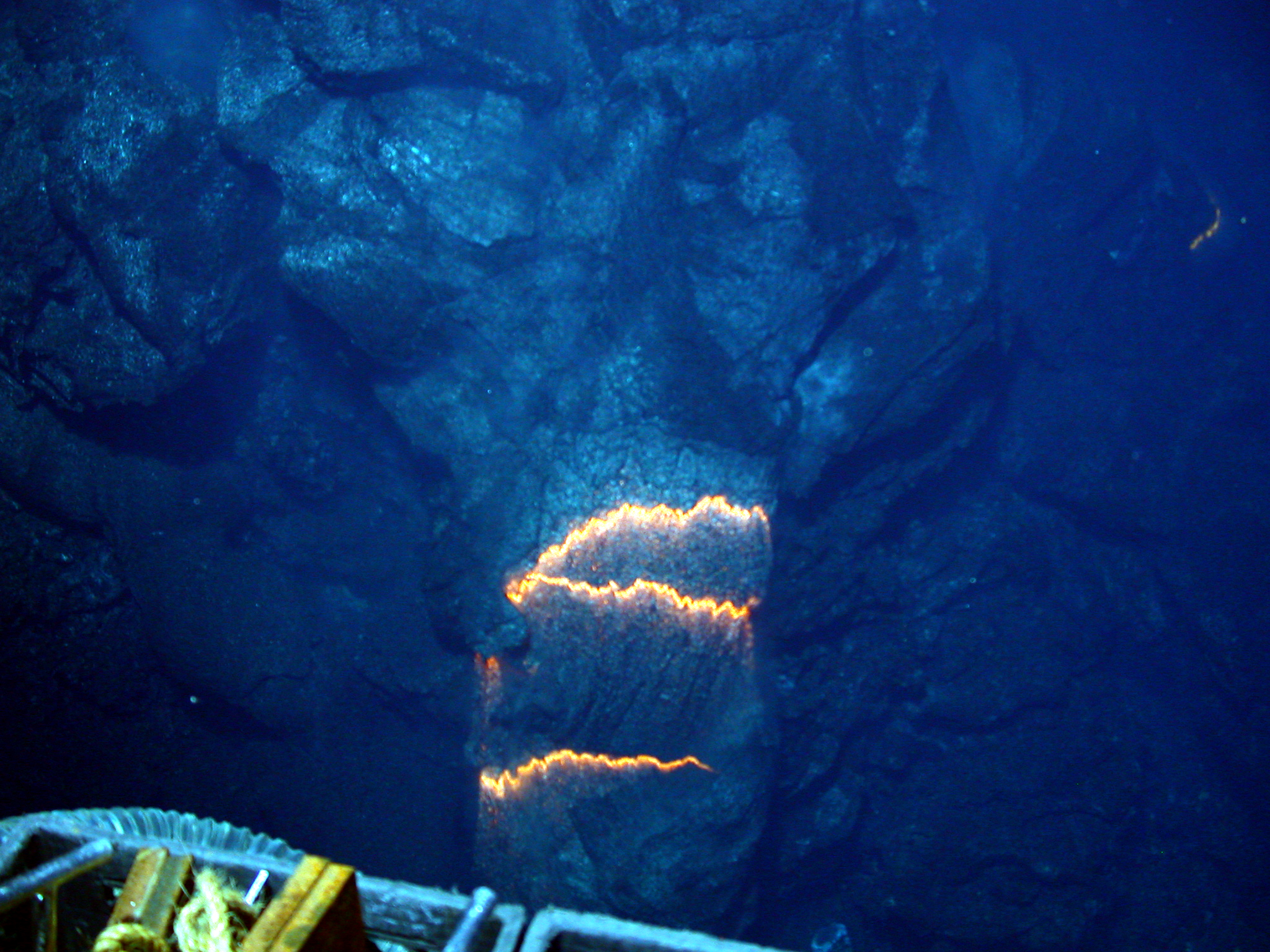
Deepest ever filmed submarine volcano, West Mata, May 2009.

There are two types of sound generated by submarine eruptions: One created by the slow release and bursting of large lava bubbles, while quick explosions of gas bubbles create the other one. Using this method to be able to distinguish the two can help measure the related effects on marine animals and ecosystems, the volume and composition of the lava flow can also be estimated and built into a model to extrapolate potential effects.

Scientists have connected sounds to sights in both types of eruptions. In 2009, a video camera and a hydrophone were floating 1,200 metres (3,900 ft) below sea level in the Pacific Ocean near Samoa, watching and listening as the West Mata Volcano erupted in several ways. Putting video and audio together let researchers learn the sounds made by slow lava bursting and the different noises made by hundreds of gas bubbles.

== Research ==
Scientists still have much to learn about the location and activity of underwater volcanoes. In the first two decades of this century, NOAA's Office of Ocean Exploration has funded exploration of submarine volcanoes, with the Ring of Fire missions to the Mariana Arc in the Pacific Ocean being particularly noteworthy. Using Remote Operated Vehicles (ROV), scientists studied underwater eruptions, ponds of molten sulfur, black smoker chimneys and even marine life adapted to this deep, hot environment.

Research from the ROV KAIKO off the coast of Hawaii has suggested that pahoehoe lava flows occur underwater, and the degree of the submarine terrain slope and rate of lava supply determine the shape of the resulting lobes.

In August 2019, news media reported a large pumice raft floating in the South Pacific between Fiji and Tonga. Subsequent scientific investigations revealed the pumice raft originated from the eruption of a nearby submarine volcano, which was directly observed as a volcanic plume in satellite images. This discovery will help scientists better predict for the precursors of a submarine eruption, such as low-frequency earthquakes or hydrophone data, using machine learning.

== Santorini: magma pressure ==
Santorini, Greece, is located in the southern Aegean Sea. It is located around 128 nautical miles southeast of the Greek mainland and about 63 nautical miles north of Crete. Crete is the largest of the Greek islands. Santorini is located along the active South Aegean Volcanic Arc. This arc was formed by the subduction of the African Plate beneath the Aegean Sea microplate. This leads to the creation of seismicity and volcanic unrest in the region. One of these cases happened in late January 2025 in Santorini. The island of Santorini and neighboring islands experienced a sequence of over 28,000 earthquakes. Several over a magnitude of 5.0. These crisis lasted the duration of a month. Scientists later found that 300 million cubic meters of magma intruded 4km below the seabed. This means that no submarine volcanoes erupted; rather, scientists found that pressure can accumulate between islands and these underwater magmatic systems. This opens a whole new set of questions. Eruptions aren't the only thing to worry about; this buildup of pressure has caused over 20,000 earthquakes and forced locals to flee. These events show that while these underwater volcanoes might not be super dangerous now, they serve as a long-term warning of potential future activity.

== See also ==
- List of submarine volcanoes
