= List of volcanoes in the United States =

This article contains a list of volcanoes, which are active, dormant, or extinct in the United States and its territories.

== Alaska ==
Name	Elevation		Location	Last eruption
Name	meters	feet	Coordinates	Last eruption
Mount Adagdak	645	2115	51°59′16″N 176°35′30″W	210,000 ± 5,000 years ago
Mount Akutan	1303	4275	54°8′4″N 165°59′10″W	1996
Alagogshak	1675	5495	59°09′26″N 155°23′54″W	43,000 ± 8,000 years ago
Amak Volcano	488	1601	55°25′26″N 163°8′57″W	1796
Mount Amukta	1066	3497	52°30′0″N 171°15′8″W	1997
Mount Aniakchak	1341	4400	56°53′0″N 158°10′0″W	1931
Mount Augustine	1252	4108	59°21′48″N 153°26′0″W	2005
Black Peak	1032	3385	56°33′11″N 158°47′12″W	1900 BCE ± 150 years
Bogoslof Island	150	492	53°56′0″N 168°2′0″W	2017
Buldir Volcano	656	2152	52°21′0″N 175°54′38″W	Holocene
Mount Bona	5005	16,421	61°23′6″N 141°45′3″W	847
Mount Blackburn	4996	16,390	61°43′54″N 143°25′59″W	3.4 million years ago
Buzzard Creek	830	2723	64°3′40″N 148°24′55″W	1050 BC
Capital Mountain	2356	7728	62.43°N 144.10°W	1.02 million years ago
Mount Carlisle	1620	5315	52°53′38″N 170°3′15″W	1987
Chagulak Island	1142	3747	52°34′36″N 171°8′0″W	Unknown
Mount Chiginagak	2221	7287	57°8′6″N 156°59′24″W	1998
Mount Cleveland	1730	5676	52°49′30″N 169°56′38″W	2020
Mount Dana	1354	4442	55°38′28″N 161°12′50″W	1890 BC
Davidof Volcano	328	1076	51.9542°N 178.326°E	Probably Holocene
Mount Denison	2318	7606	58°25′4″N 154°26′57″W	Probably Holocene
Devils Desk	1954	6409	58.5°N 154.3°W	245,000 years ago
Double Glacier Volcano	1239	4065	60.68°N 152.62°W	Pleistocene
Mount Douglas	2140	7021	58°51′19″N 153°32′31″W	Probably Holocene
Mount Dutton	1506	4941	55°10′5″N 162°16′18″W	Holocene
Mount Edgecumbe	970	3132	57°3′0″N 135°45′0″W	2220 BC ± 100 years
Mount Emmons	1436	4711	55°20′26″N 164°4′43″W	More than 10,000 years ago
Espenberg			66.35°N 164.33°W	17,500 years BP
Mount Fisher	1112	3648	54°39′0″N 164°26′0″W	1830
Fourpeaked	2105	6906	58°46′12″N 153°40′20″W	2006
Frosty Peak Volcano	1920	6299	55.082°N 162.894°W	Late Pleistocene or later
Gareloi Volcano	1573	5161	51°47′25″N 178°47′38″W	1989
Mount Gilbert	818	2684	54.2521°N 165.662°W	Unknown, fumaroles until 1948
Great Sitkin	1740	5709	52°4′34″N 176°7′48″W	2026 (ongoing non-stop)
Mount Gordon	2755	9039	62°8′0″N 143°5′0″W	Holocene
Mount Griggs	2317	7602	58°21′14″N 155°5′30″W	1790 BC ± 40 years
Hayes Volcano	3034	9954	61°38′25″N 152°24′41″W	1200 ± 300 years
Mount Herbert	1280	4199	52°44′32″N 170°6′38″W	Unknown
Mount Iliamna	3053	10,016	60°1′55″N 153°5′25″W	1876
Imuruk Lake	610	2001	65°36′0″N 163°55′0″W	300
Ingakslugwat Hills	190	623	61°26′0″N 164°28′0″W	Holocene
Isanotski Peaks	2446	8025	54°45′54″N 163°43′21″W	Unknown
Kagamil Island	893	2930	52°58′25″N 169°43′0″W	1929
Mount Kaguyak	901	2956	58°36′30″N 154°1′40″W	1650 BC
Mount Kanaga	1307	4288	51°55′22″N 177°10′4″W	2012
Kasatochi Island	314	1030	52°10′39″N 175°30′30″W	2008
Mount Katmai	2047	6716	58°16′47″N 154°57′48″W	1912
Kejulik Volcano	1517	4977	58°01′33″N 155°39′17″W	Unknown
Mount Kialagvik	1575	5167	57°12′10″N 156°44′43″W	Holocene
Kiska Volcano	1220	4003	52.1031°N 177.6035°E	1990
Koniuji Island	273	896	52°13′0″N 175°8′0″W	1150 BC
Korovin Volcano	1533	5029	52°22′54″N 174°9′57″W	2007
Mount Kukak	2043	6703	58°27′10″N 154°21′18″W	Holocene
Mount Kupreanof	1895	6217	56°0′40″N 159°47′50″W	1987
Kookooligit Mountains	673	2208	63°36′0″N 170°26′0″W	Holocene
Little Sitkin	1174	3852	51°57′0″N 178°32′35″W	1830
Mount Mageik	2165	7103	58°11′41″N 155°15′10″W	500 BC ± 50 years
Mount Makushin	1800	5905	53°53′27″N 165°55′22″W	1996
Mount Martin	1863	6112	58°10′20″N 155°21′40″W	1953
Mount Moffett	1196	3924	51°56′38″N 176°44′48″W	1600 BC
Novarupta	841	2759	58°16′0″N 155°9′24″W	1912
Nunivak Island	511	1676	60°1′0″N 166°20′0″W	300,000 years ago
Mount Okmok	1073	3520	53°26′0″N 168°8′0″W	2008
St. Michael volcanic field	715	2346	63°27′0″N 162°7′0″W	More recent than 500 BC
Mount Pavlof	2519	8264	55°25′0″N 161°53′15″W	2022
Pavlof Sister	2142	7027	55°27′10″N 161°50′35″W	1786
Pogromni	2002	6569	54.57°N 164.85°W	Late Pleistocene
Pyre Peak	1054	3458	52°18′55″N 172°35′30″W	1993
Mount Recheschnoi	1984	6509	53°9′24″N 168°32′20″W	3,000 years ago
Mount Redoubt	3108	10,197	60°29′7″N 152°44′31″W	2009
Roundtop Mountain	1871	6138	54°48′0″N 163°35′20″W	9,100-10,000 years ago
Mount Sanford	4949	16,237	62°13′0″N 144°8′0″W	320,000 years ago
Mount Segula	1160	3806	52°0′55″N 178°8′8″W	A few hundred years ago
Semisopochnoi Island	1221	4006	51°56′0″N 179°35′0″W	2023
Mount Sergief	560	1837	52°2′0″N 174°56′0″W	Pleistocene
Mount Shishaldin	2857	9373	54°45′20″N 163°58′0″W	2023
Snowy Mountain	2162	7093	58°20′8″N 154°40′55″W	1710 ± 200 years
Mount Spurr	3374	11,069	61°17′58″N 152°15′4″W	1992
St. Michael volcanic field	715	2346	63°27′0″N 162°7′0″W	Within 3,000 years
St. Paul Island	203	666	57°11′0″N 170°18′0″W	1280 BC ± 40 years
Mount Steller	2272	7454	58°26′0″N 154°24′0″W	Probably Holocene
Stepovak Bay 3	1555	5102	55°56′0″N 160°0′0″W	Probably Pleiocene
Table Top-Wide Bay	792	2598	53°58′5″N 166°40′38″W	Holocene
Mount Takawangha	1449	4754	51°52′22″N 178°0′20″W	Last few hundred years
Tana (volcano)	1170	3839	52°49′48″N 169°16′12″W	Mid-late Holocene
Mount Tanaga	1806	5925	51°53′6″N 178°8′45″W	1914
Tlevak Strait-Suemez Island	50	164	55°15′0″N 133°18′0″W	Holocene/Post-glacial
Trident Volcano	1864	6115	58°14′8″N 155°6′0″W	1975
Ugashik-Peulik	1474	4836	57°45′3″N 156°22′5″W	1814
Ukinrek maars	91	299	57°49′54″N 156°30′35″W	1977
Uliaga Island	888	2913	53°3′54″N 169°46′0″W	Holocene
Mount Veniaminof	2507	8225	56°10′0″N 159°23′0″W	2021
Mount Vsevidof	2149	7050	53°7′48″N 168°41′35″W	1957
Mount Westdahl	1654	5426	54°31′6″N 164°39′0″W	1992
Yantarni Volcano	1345	4413	57°1′17″N 157°11′6″W	800 BC ± 500 years
Yunaska Island	550	1804	52°38′34″N 170°37′43″W	1937
Prindle Volcano	-	-	63.72°N 141.62°W	Pleistocene
Mount Churchill	4766	15,632	61.25°N 141.7°W	700 ± 200 years
Mount Drum	3661	12,010	62.1°N 144.5°W	About 250,000 years ago
Mount Jarvis	4091	13,422	62°1′4″N 143°37′2″W	1 million years ago
Mount Wrangell	4317	14,163	62.00°N 144.02°W	1999

== American Samoa ==
Name	Elevation		Location	Last eruption
Name	meters	feet	Coordinates	Last eruption
Malumalu	-	-	14°36′29″S 169°47′06″W	Last 8,000 years
Taʻū	931	3054	14.23°S 169.454°W	30,000 years ago
Ofu-Olosega	639	2096	14.175°S 169.618°W	1866 unnamed submarine cone eruption
Tutuila	653	2142	14.295°S 170.70°W	440 CE
Vailuluʻu	-592	-1842	14.295°S 170.70°W	2003 west of unnamed submarine caldera and nafauna

== Arizona ==
Name	Elevation		Location	Last eruption
Name	meters	feet	Coordinates	Last eruption
Arlington Cone	-	-	33°20′55.6″N 112°44′54.2″W	-
Black Bottom Crater	-	-	35°23′54.02″N 111°23′42.55″W	-
Colton Crater	2,246	7,368	35°32′42″N 111°38′13.2″W	1075 AD Sunset Crater and Unnamed Fissure vents
Double Crater	2,426	7,959	35°20′34.03″N 111°26′51.55″W	Pleistocene
Lenox Crater	-	-	35°21′35.999″N 111°31′47.62″W	-
Maroon Crater	-	-	35°26′32.02″N 111°28′12.56″W	-
Merriam Cone	2,077	6,813	35°18′N 111°18′W	150,000 years ago
Mount Baldy	3,480	11,420	33°54′22″N 109°33′46″W	8-9 million years ago
Mount Elden	2,834	9,299	35°14′28″N 111°35′48″W	250,000 years ago
Red Mountain	2428	7965	35°31′23″N 111°52′32″W	740,000 years ago
Roden Crater	-	-	35°25′37.02″N 111°15′27.76″W	400,000 years ago
San Francisco Peaks	3851	12,633	35°20′47″N 111°40′40″W	92,000 years ago
San Francisco volcanic field	-	-	35°21′51″N 111°30′11″W	1075 AD ± 25 years
SP Crater	2141	7021	35°34′56″N 111°37′55″W	5,500 years ago
Stewart Crater	-	-	35°21′39.6″N 111°24′14.4″W	-
Strawberry Crater	1,989	6,526	35°26′32.02″N 111°28′12.6″W	Late Pleistocene
Sunset Crater (San Francisco volcanic field)	2447	8026	35°21′51″N 111°30′11″W	1075 AD ± 25 years
Uinkaret volcanic field	-	-	36°13′7.93″N 113°4′38.74″W	1100 AD ± 75 years Little Springs Pyroclastic Cone

== California ==
Name	Elevation		Location	Last eruption
Name	meters	feet	Coordinates	Last eruption
Amboy Crater	- 300	- 984	- 34°32′38″N 115°47′28″W	23 million years ago 79,000 ± 5,000 years ago
Big Cave	1259	4131	40.955°N 121.365°W	38,000 ± 7,000 years ago
Big Pine volcanic field			37°00′N 118°15′W	17,000 years ago
Black Butte	1939	6362	41.363°N 122.348°W	9,500 years ago
Brushy Butte	1174	3852	41.178°N 121.443°W	12,000 years ago
Burney Mountain	2397	7863	40.81°N 121.63°W	280,000 ± 6,000 years ago
Cima volcanic field	1509	6925	35.25°N 115.75°W	15,000 ± 5,000 years ago
Cinder Cone and the Fantastic Lava Beds	2105	6907	40.55°N 121.32°W	1666
Inyo Craters	2629	8625	37.692°N 119.02°W	1380 CE ± 50 years
Mount Konocti (Clear Lake Volcanic Field)	1312	4305	38.97°N 122.77°W	11,000 years ago
Lassen Peak	3189	10,462	40°29′17″N 121°30′18″W	1917
Lassen Volcanic Center	-	-	40°29′30″N 121°30′30″W	1917
Long Valley Caldera	3390	11,122	37.6°N 118.8°W	50,000 years ago
Malapai Hill	1304	4278	33.9°N 116.0°W	15.93 ± 0.08 million years ago
Mammoth Mountain	3371	11,059	37.63°N 119.03°W	1260 AD ± 40 years
Medicine Lake Volcano	2412	7913	41.36°N 121.33°W	1060 AD
Mono Craters	2,796	9,173	37.88°N 119.00°W	1350 AD ± 20 years
Pinnacles	-	-	36.487°N 121.167°W	23 million years ago
Pipkin			34°41′12″N 116°37′12″W	770,000 ± 40,000 years ago
Pisgah Crater	774	2,539	34°44′47″N 116°22′30″W	18,000 ± 5,000 years ago
Red Cones	2,748	9,015	37.58°N 119.05°W	8,500 years ago
Round Mountain (Clear Lake Volcanic Field)	696	2,294	39.048955°N 122.636205°W	10,000 years ago
Round Top	538	1,764	37.85°N 122.48°W	10 Million Years Ago
Mount Saint Helena	1,323	4,342	38.67°N 122.63°W	3.4 million years ago
Mount Shasta	4,317	14,162	41.409°N 122.193°W	1250
Sutter Buttes	650	2,130	39°12′20.61″N 121°49′12.9″W	1.5 million years ago
Tumble Buttes	2,191	7,188	40.68°N 121.55°W	10,000 – 15,000 years ago
Twin Buttes	1631	5351	40.78°N 121.60°W	10,000 to 15,000 years ago
Ubehebe Craters	752	2467	37.02°N 117.45°W	150 BC

== Colorado ==
Name	Elevation		Location	Last eruption
Name	meters	feet	Coordinates	Last eruption
Dotsero	2,230	7,316	39°39′40″N 107°02′06″W	2200 BC ± 300 years
La Garita Caldera	4,274	14,022	37°43′36″N 106°46′28″W	26.3 Ma
Never Summer Mountains	3,946	12,945	40°28′10″N 105°53′42″W	24 to 29 million years ago
Summer Coon	-	-	37°46′51″N 106°22′09″W	24 to 34 million years ago

== Hawaii ==
Name	Elevation		Location	Last eruption
Name	meters	feet	Coordinates	Last eruption
Diamond Head	232	761	21°15′35″N 157°48′42″W	400,000 to 500,000 years ago
Haleakalā or East Maui Volcano	3055	10,023	20.71°N 156.25°W	1750
Hanauma Bay (Koko Head)	196	642	21°16′17″N 157°41′40″W	10,000 - 32,000 years ago
Hualālai	2521	8270	19.69°N 155.87°W	1801
Kaʻau Crater	462	1,516	21°19′43″N 157°46′21″W	35000 or 76000 years ago.
Kaʻena Point	-	-	21°34′31″N 158°16′57″W	Pleistocene Epoch
Kahoʻolawe	450	1475	20.6°N 156.6°W	1 million years ago
Kauhakō Crater	150	490	21°11′16″N 156°57′58″W	230,000-300,000 years ago
Kawaikini	1,598	5,243	22°03′24″N 159°29′48″W	4 million years ago
Kīlauea	1247	4091	19.452°N 155.292°W	January 2026 (ongoing)
Kohala	1670	5480	20°5′10″N 155°43′2″W	120,000 years ago
Koko Guyot	-	-	35°15′N 171°35′E	50 million years ago
Koko Crater	368	1207	21.261585°N 157.702949°W	10,000 years ago
Koʻolau Range	941	3149	21.37°N 157.80°W	40,000 years ago
Lānaʻi	1,026	3,366	20°50′N 156°56′W	1.2 million years ago
Kamaʻehuakanaloa Seamount (Loihi)	-975	-3199	18.92°N 155.25°W	1996
Māhukona	-	-	20.1°N 156.1°W	About 470,000 years ago
Mauna Kea	4208	13,796	19.8°N 155.5°W	2460 BC ± 100 years
Mauna Loa	4169	13,679	19.5°N 155.6°W	2022
Mount Waiʻaleʻale	1,544	5,066	22°04′26″N 159°29′55″W	-
Puʻu Hawaiʻiloa	103	337	21°26′53″N 157°45′24″W	450,000 - 420,000
Punchbowl Crater	-	-	21°18′45″N 157°50′46″W	400,000 to 500,000 years ago
Ulupaʻu Crater	201	659	21°27′16″N 157°43′54″W	600,000 - 400,000 years ago
Waiʻanae Range	1342	4,025	21°30′25″N 158°08′34″W	2.6 million years ago
West Maui Volcano	1,764	5,788	20°53′37″N 156°35′22″W	320,000 years ago

== Idaho ==
Name	Elevation		Location	Last eruption
Name	meters	feet	Coordinates	Last eruption
Big Southern Butte	2298	7540	43.24°N 113.01°W	300,000 years ago
Blue Creek	-	-	-	-
Craters of the Moon	2005	6578	43.42°N 113.50°W	130 BC ± 50 years
Yellowstone Plateau volcanic field	2805	9203	44°28′16″N 110°30′07″W	70,000 years ago (magmatic) / 1350 BC ± 200 years (hydrothermal)
Juniper Buttes	1905	6250	44.20°N 111.53°W	-
Menan Buttes	1713	5619	43.60°N 111.5°W	10,000 years ago
Shoshone Volcano	-	-	-	-
Split Butte	-	-	44.25°N 111.73°W	-
The Great Rift	-	-	43°27′42″N 113°33′46″W	-

== Illinois ==
Name	Elevation		Location	Last eruption
Name	meters	feet	Coordinates	Last eruption
Hicks Dome	203	666	37.53°N 88.37°W	400-345 million years ago

== Louisiana ==
Name	Elevation		Location	Last eruption
Name	meters	feet	Coordinates	Last eruption
Door Point Volcano	-2200	-7200	-	74-90 million years ago

== Michigan ==
Name	Elevation		Location	Last eruption
Name	meters	feet	Coordinates	Last eruption
Porcupine Mountains Central-Volcano	595	1,958	46°46′52″N 89°40′51″W	1.093 billion years ago

== Mississippi ==
Name	Elevation		Location	Last eruption
Name	meters	feet	Coordinates	Last eruption
Jackson Volcano	-880 (from surface)	-2900	32°18′0″N 90°10′19″W	65 million years ago
Midnight Volcano	-1110 (from surface)	-3641	33.04904°N 90.573494°W	66 million years ago

== Missouri ==
Name	Elevation		Location	Last eruption
Name	meters	feet	Coordinates	Last eruption
Taum Sauk Caldera	540	1772	37.5288°N 90.7862°W	1.485 billion years ago

== Montana ==
Name	Elevation		Location	Last eruption
Name	meters	feet	Coordinates	Last eruption
Elkhorn Mountains	2869	9414	46.3022957°N 112.012053°W	Late Cretaceous, 74 million years ago
Yellowstone Plateau Volcanic Field	2805	9203	45.5°N 110.52°W	70,000 years ago (magmatic) / 1350 BC ± 200 years (hydrothermal)

== Nevada ==
Name	Elevation		Location	Last eruption
Name	meters	feet	Coordinates	Last eruption
Cottonwood Caldera	-	-	-	15.70 million years ago
Crater Flat (Southwest Nevada Volcanic Field)	-	-	36°47′N 116°34′W	80,000 years ago
Indian Peak-Caliente Caldera Complex	-	-	38°00′00″N 114°00′00″W	18 million years ago
Jessup area	-	-	39°56′N 118°52′W	Jurassic
Lunar Crater volcanic field	-	-	38°N 116°W	38,100 ± 10,000 years ago
McDermitt Caldera	2078	6816	42°00′05″N 117°59′48″W	16.39 ± 0.02 million years ago
Steamboat Springs	1415	4642	39.375°N 119.72°W	1.14 million years ago
Soda Lakes	1251	4104	39°53′N 119°27′W	Holocene
Virgin Valley Caldera	-	-	-	16.38 million years ago
Yucca Mountain	2044	6707	36°56′N 116°29′W	80,000 years ago

== New Hampshire ==
Name	Elevation		Location	Last eruption
Name	meters	feet	Coordinates	Last eruption
Pawtuckaway Mountains	-	-	43°06′39″N 71°11′11″W	Cretaceous
Ossipee Mountains	-	-	43°44′37″N 71°16′26″W	Cretaceous

== New Jersey ==
Name	Elevation		Location	Last eruption
Name	meters	feet	Coordinates	Last eruption
Rutan Hill	310	1,020	41°14′43″N 74°40′35″W	Ordovician

== New Mexico ==
Name	Elevation		Location	Last eruption
Name	meters	feet	Coordinates	Last eruption
Albuquerque volcanic field	1,840	6,030	35°8′29″N 106°46′19″W	70,000-170,000 years ago
Capulin Volcano	2,494	8,182	36°47′20″N 103°57′42″W	58,000–52,000 years ago
Carrizozo Malpais	1,731	5,679	33°47′N 105°56′W	3,250 BC ± 500 years ago
Cerros del Rio	664	2,178	35°42′N 106°12′W	2.2 million years ago
Jemez Mountains	3,525	-	35°53′N 106°32′W	60,000-50,000 years ago
Jornada del Muerto Volcano	1,565	5,136	33°32′N 106°52′W	760,000 years ago
Kilbourne Hole	1,555	4,240	31°58′N 106°58′W	80,000 years ago
Mount Taylor	2,445	11,300	35°14′19″N 107°36′30″W	1,500,000 years ago
Shiprock	2,188	7,177	36°41′15″N 108°50′10″W	27 million years ago
Sierra Blanca	3,652	11,981	33°22′27″N 105°48′31″W	26 million years ago
Valles Caldera	3,430	11,253	35°52′N 106°34′W	50,000 to 60,000 years ago
Zuni-Bandera volcanic field	2,550	8,366	34°48′N 108°00′W	1,170 BC ± 300 years

== North Carolina ==
Name	Elevation		Location	Last eruption
Name	meters	feet	Coordinates	Last eruption
Hillsborough Caldera	-	-	36°4′24″N 78°58′52″W	630 million years ago
Morrow Mountain	276	906	35°21′8.49″N 80°05′34.19″W	550 million years ago
Pond Mountain Volcanic Center	1517.904	4980	36°34′29.1″N 81°39′10.7″W	760 million years ago

== Northern Mariana Islands ==
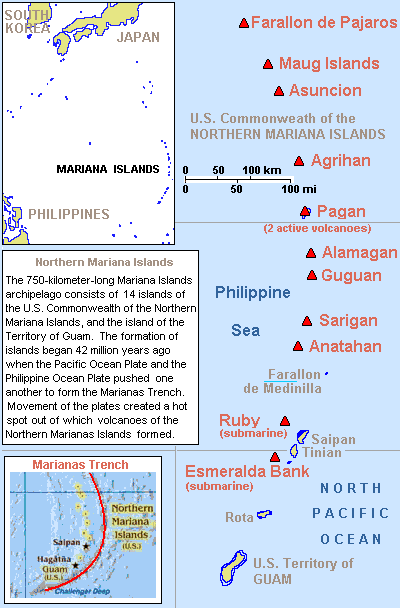
Major volcanoes of the Mariana Islands

Name	Elevation		Location	Last eruption
Name	meters	feet	Coordinates	Last eruption
Agrigan	965	3165	18.8°N 145.7°E	1917
Ahyi Seamount	-137	-449	20.42°N 145.03°E	2025 (continuing)
Alamagan	744	2441	17.60°N 145.83°E	1887
Anatahan	788	2592	16.35°N 145.67°E	2008
Asuncion Island	857	2810	19.7°N 145.4°E	1906
Daikoku Seamount	-323	-1060	21.32°N 144.19°E	Holocene
Eifuku	-1535	-5036	21.485°N 144.043°E	Holocene
East Diamante	-127	-417	15.93°N 145.67°E	Holocene
Esmeralda Bank	-43	-141	15.00°N 145.25°E	Holocene
Farallon de Pajaros	360	1,180	20.5°N 144.9°E	1967
Forecast Seamount	-1456	-4777	13.4°N 143.92°E	Holocene
Fukujin Seamount	-217	-712	21.93°N 143.47°E	1974
Guguan	287	942	17.32°N 145.83°E	1883
Kasuga Seamounts	-598	-1962	21.765°N 143.71°E	1959
Maug Islands	227	745	20.02°N 145.22°E	Pleistocene
Northwest Rota-1	-517	-1696	14.601°N 144.775°E	2004
Pagan Island	570	1870	18.10°N 145.76°E	2021
Ruby Seamount	-230	-755	15.62°N 145.57°E	2023
Sarigan	538	1765	16.708°N 145.78°E	Unknown
Seamount X	-1230	-4035	13.25°N 144.02°E	Holocene
South Sarigan Seamount	-184	-604	16.58°N 145.78°E	2010
Supply Reef	-8	-26	20.13°N 145.10°E	1989
Zealandia Bank	0	0	16.88°N 145.85°E	Holocene

== Oregon ==
Name	Elevation		Location	Last eruption
Name	meters	feet	Coordinates	Last eruption
Mount Bachelor	2,763	9,064	43°58′45.90″N 121°41′18.63″W	5800 BC ± 750 years
Bald Mountain Caldera	-	-	43°25′N 121°25′W	3.4 to 4.6 million years ago
Mount Bailey	2,551	8,368	43°9′18.52″N 122°13′11.98″W	11,000 to 100,000 years ago
Belknap Crater	2,095	6,873	44°17′05.80″N 121°50′32.04″W	480 AD
Black Butte	1,962	6,436	44°23′59.0″N 121°38′07.7″W	About 1,430,000 years ago
Blue Lake Crater	1,230	4,035	44°24′40″N 121°46′26″W	680 AD ± 200 years
Broken Top	2,800	9,185	44°04′58″N 121°41′59″W	About 100,000 years ago
Brown Mountain	-	-	42°22′N 122°16′W	12,000 to 60,000 years ago
Cinnamon Butte	1,956	6,417	43°14′28″N 122°06′29″W	4855 BC to 9,000 BC
Columbia River Basalt Group	-	-	-	6.0 million years ago
Crater Lake (Mount Mazama)	2,487	8,159	42°56′N 122°07′W	2850 BC
Crooked River caldera	-	-	44°18′N 120°54′W	29.5 million years ago
Diamond Craters	1,450	4,750	43°06′N 118°42′W	5610 BC ± 470 years
Diamond Peak	2,665	8,744	43°31′14.5″N 122°08′58.5″W	11,000 to 100,000 years ago
Fort Rock	1,716	5,628	43°22′27″N 121°04′08″W	13,500 to 18,000 years ago
Gray Butte	-	-	44°30′N 121°18′W	29.5 million years ago
Mount Hood	3,426	11,237	45°22′24.65″N 121°41′45.31″W	1866
Jackies Butte	1,418	4,652	42°36′22″N 117°35′20″W	Holocene
Mount Jefferson	3,199	10,492	44°42′N 121°48′W	950 AD
Jordan Craters	1,400	4,600	43°08′49″N 117°27′36″W	1250 BC or later
Maiden Peak	2,380	7,810	43°37′37″N 121°57′50″W	Pleistocene
McDermitt Caldera	2,078	6,816	-	16.39 ± 0.02 million years ago
Mahogany Mountain	-	-	43°14′06″N 117°15′21″W	15.5 million years ago
Mount McLoughlin	2,894	9,492	42°26′40.10″N 122°18′56.23″W	20,000 to 30,000 years ago
Middle Sister	3,063	10,050	44°09′N 121°47′W	14,000 years ago
Newberry Caldera	2,434	7,986	43°42′N 121°30′W	690 AD ± 100 years
North Sister	3,075	10,090	44°10′N 121°46′W	46,000 years ago
Olallie Butte	2,200	7,219	44°49′18.1″N 121°45′50.2″W	11,000 years ago or earlier
Pelican Butte	-	-	42°31′N 122°04′W	60,000 years ago or earlier
Rocky Butte	-	-	45°32′48″N 122°33′57″W	30,000 to 90,000 years ago
Round Butte	-	-	44°30′N 121°00′W	-
Saddle Butte	1,700	-	43°00′N 117°48′W	430,000 ± 90,000 years ago
South Sister	3,158	10,360	44°06′N 121°46′W	50 BC
Strawberry Volcanics	-	-	44°12′N 118°48′W	12.5 to 16.2 million years ago
Mount Sylvania	298	978	45°26′17″N 122°43′21″W	1 million years ago or earlier
Mount Tabor	-	636	45°30′46″N 122°35′33″W	300,000 years ago or earlier
Mount Thielsen	2,800	9,184	43°09′10.21″N 122°03′59.45″W	290,000 years ago
Three Fingered Jack	2,390	7,840	44°28′42″N 121°50′29″W	40,000 to 80,000 years ago
Tower Mountain (Oregon)	-	-	-	22.0 million years ago
Mount Washington	2,376	7,790	44°19′55″N 121°50′13″W	700 AD
Wildcat Mountain Caldera	-	-	-	36.0 million years ago

== Texas ==
Name	Elevation		Location	Last eruption
Name	meters	feet	Coordinates	Last eruption
Cornudas Mountains	2145	7039	31°59′42″N 105°32′56″W	Tertiary
Inge Mountain	125	410	29°10′52″N 99°45′58″W	Eocene or possibly Miocene
Pilot Knob	169	576	30°09′43″N 97°42′22″W	79 to 83 million years ago (late Cretaceous)

== Utah ==
Name	Elevation		Location	Last eruption
Name	meters	feet	Coordinates	Last eruption
Bald Knoll Volcanic Field	2,135	7,005	37°19′41″N 112°24′29″W	300,000 years ago or later
Black Rock Desert Volcanic Field	1,800	5,904	38°58′12″N 112°30′00″W	1290 AD ± 150 years
Fumarole Butte	1,609	5,279	39°36′54″N 112°48′11″W	900,000 years ago
Indian Peak-Caliente Caldera Complex	-	-	38°00′00″N 114°00′00″W	18 million years ago
Marysvale Volcanic Field	3,694	12,137	38°30′00″N 112°30′00″W	19 million years ago
Markagunt Plateau Volcanic Field	2,840	9,318	37°37′01″N 112°49′30″W	1050 AD
Santa Clara Volcanic Field	1,465	4,806	37°15′25″N 113°37′30″W	32,000 years ago
Wah Wah Springs Caldera	1,672	5,485	38°28′44″N 113°29′20″W	30.06 million years ago

== Virginia ==
Name	Elevation		Location	Last eruption
Name	meters	feet	Coordinates	Last eruption
Culpeper Basin	-	-	38°23′55″N 77°25′18″W	201 million years ago (late Triassic)
Mole Hill	577	1,893	38°26′26″N 78°57′12″W	47 million years ago (early Eocene)
Trimble Knob	952	3,123	38°24′17″N 79°35′16″W	35 million years ago (late Eocene)
Catoctin Formation	-	-	40°44′31″N 73°49′22″W	560 million years ago (Ediacaran)
Battle Mountain	354	1,162	38°39′26″N 78°3′36″W	704 million years ago (Cryogenian)

== Washington ==
Name	Elevation		Location	Last eruption
Name	meters	feet	Coordinates	Last eruption
Battle Ground Lake	229	750	45°48′19″N 122°39′29″W	105,000 years ago
Black Buttes	2,857	9,373	48°46′09″N 121°51′10″W	500,000 to 300,000 years ago
Mount Adams	3,743	12,281	46°12′09″N 121°29′27″W	500 BC ± 1000 years
Mount Baker	3,285	10,778	48°46′38″N 121°48′48″W	1880
Glacier Peak	3,213	10,541	48°06′45″N 121°06′50″W	1700 ± 100 years
Goat Rocks	2,494	8,184	46°30′N 121°27′W	500,000 years ago
Indian Heaven	1,513	5,925	45°56′N 121°49′W	~6250 BC
Lone Butte	1457	4,780	46°03′16″N 121°50′21″W	Either 80,000 or 140,000 years ago ± 10,000 years
Marble Mountain-Trout Creek Hill volcanic zone	1,378	4,521	45°54′N 122°00′W	~7700 years ago
Mount Rainier	4,392	14,411	46°51′11″N 121°45′35″W	1894
Mount St. Helens	2,550	8,364	46°11′28″N 122°11′39″W	2008
Mount Si	1,270	4,167	47°30′27″N 121°44′24″W	Cretaceous to Jurassic
Pinnacle Peak	549	1,801	47°10′25″N 121°58′24″W	
Silver Star Mountain	1,330	4,364	45°44′51.8″N 122°14′20.5″W	Pluton formed 20 million years ago
Simcoe Mountains	1954	6,410	46°06′N 120°54′W	631,000 ± 27,000 years ago
Trout Creek Hill	890	2,920	45°50′11″N 121°59′41″W	340,000 years ago
Tumtum Mountain	611	2,004	45°56′03″N 122°20′13″W	70,000 years ago
West Crater	1,329	4,360	45°53′N 122°05′W	~6000 BC
White Chuck Cinder Cone	1,830	6,002	48°03′N 121°10′W	Between 17,000 and 2,000 years ago

== West Virginia ==
Name	Elevation		Location	Last eruption
Name	meters	feet	Coordinates	Last eruption
Ugly Mountain	792	2,598	38°26′11″N 79°19′25″W	42.8 ±0.5 Ma

== Wyoming ==
Name	Elevation		Location	Last eruption
Name	meters	feet	Coordinates	Last eruption
Yellowstone Caldera	2,805	9,203	44°28′16″N 110°30′07″W	70,000 years ago (magmatic) / 1350 BC ± 200 years (hydrothermal)

== See also ==
- Geothermal energy in the United States
- List of Cascade volcanoes
- List of large volume volcanic eruptions in the Basin and Range Province
- List of volcanoes in Canada
- List of volcanoes in Mexico
- List of volcanoes in Russia
- List of volcanic craters in Alaska
- List of volcanic craters in Arizona
- List of lava flows in Arizona
- List of Yellowstone geothermal features
- National Volcano Early Warning and Monitoring System
- United States Geological Survey National Volcanic Threat Assessment
