= Kasuga 1 =

Active submarine volcano in the Mariana Islands

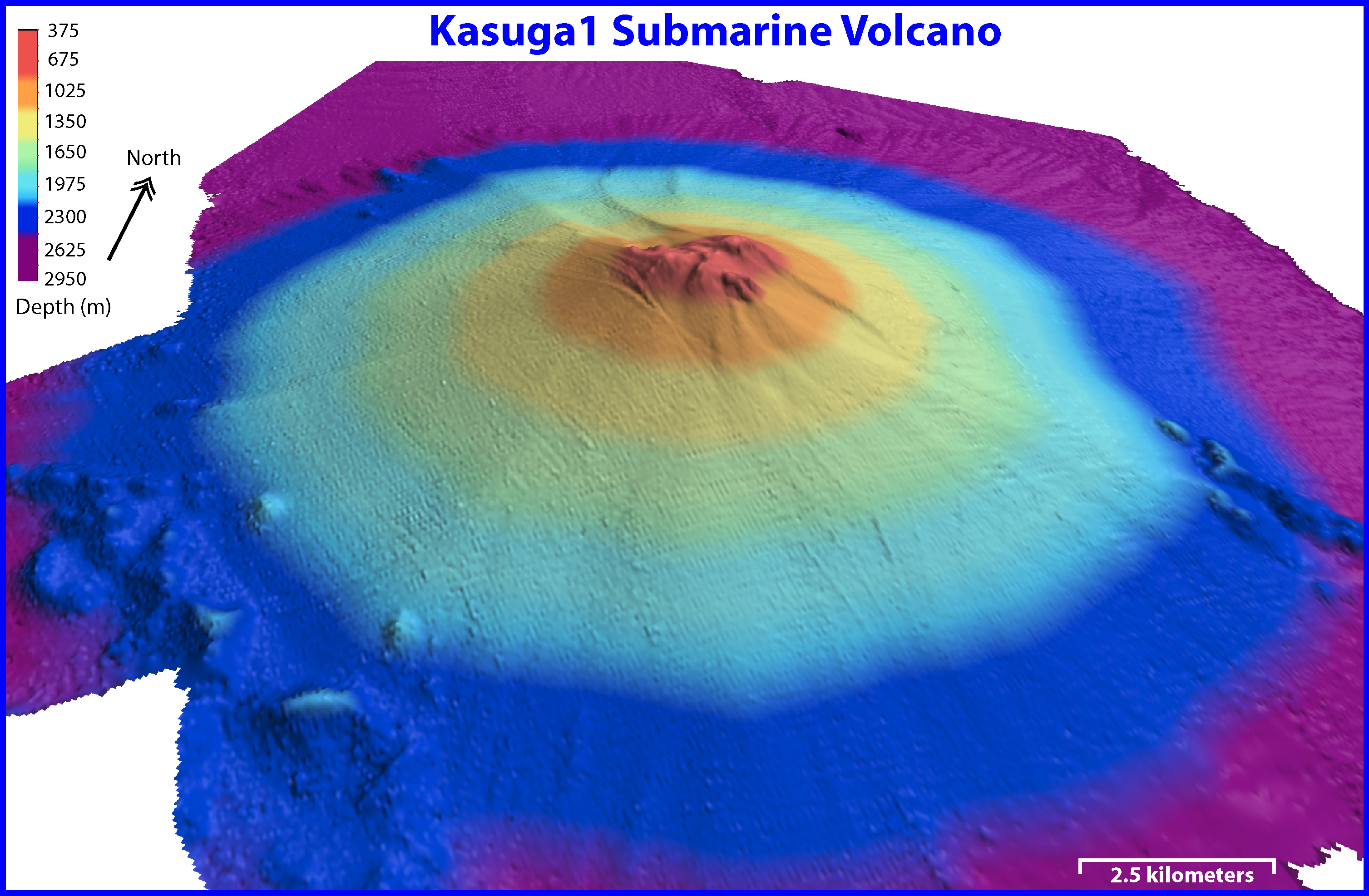
- Kasuga 1
- Summit depth: −598 m (−1,962 ft)
- Height: ~2,400 m (7,874 ft)

Location
- Range: Mariana volcanic arc
- Coordinates: 21.765°N 143.71°E
- Country: United States

Geology
- Type: Stratovolcanoes
- Last eruption: 1959

Kasuga 1 is a seamount and active volcano of the Mariana volcanic arc. It rises 3,000 m (9,800 ft) above the seafloor to about 600 m (2,000 ft) beneath the ocean surface. The volcano represents the northernmost of the three that forms the Kasuga seamount chain and is located southeast of Fukujin. Its last confirmed eruption was in July 1959 which produced pumice and another possible eruption may have occurred in 1975 when discolored water was observed around the seamount. Based on the samples of basalt and andesite collected at the summit, it is the oldest of the seamounts.

== See also ==
- List of volcanoes in the United States
