= Imuruk Lake volcanic field =

Volcanic field in Alaska, United States

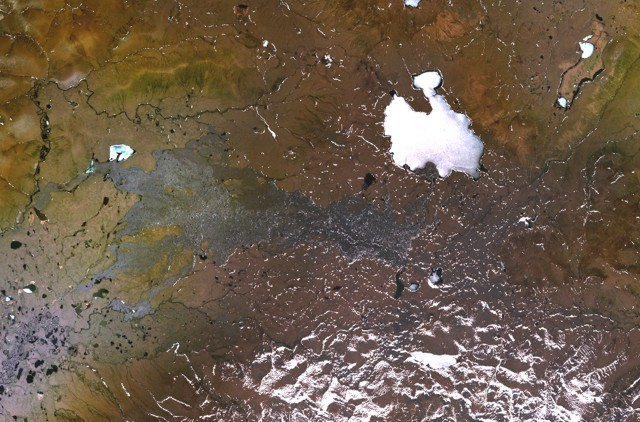

Highest point
- Elevation: 2,001 ft (610 m)
- Listing: List of volcanoes in the United States of America
- Coordinates: 65.60°N 163.92°W

Geography
- Location: Seward Peninsula, Alaska, United States

Geology
- Mountain type: Volcanic field
- Last eruption: 300 CE (?)

The Imuruk Lake volcanic field is a volcanic field in western Alaska, United States, located by Imuruk Lake in the Bering Land Bridge National Preserve in central Seward Peninsula. It is considered part of the Bering Sea Volcanic Province.

== See also ==
- List of volcanic fields
