= Mariana Islands =

Archipelago in the north-western Pacific Ocean

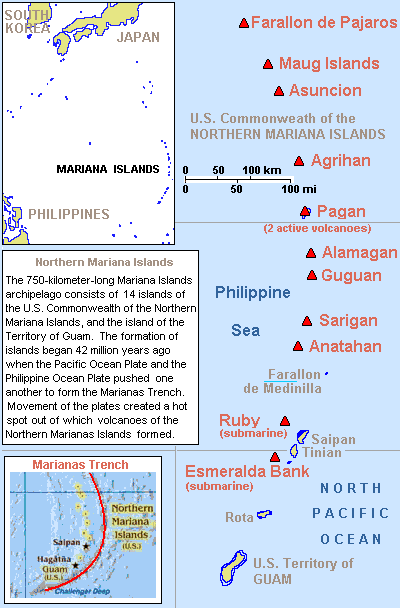
- The Mariana Islands are shown, with the territory of Guam to the extreme south, and the Commonwealth of the Northern Mariana Islands (14 islands) to the north. Active volcanoes are shown with triangles.
- Interactive map of Mariana Islands

Geography
- Location: Pacific Ocean
- Coordinates: 16.70°N 145.78°E

Administration
- United States; Guam (U.S.); Northern Mariana Islands (U.S.)

The Mariana Islands (/ˌmæriˈɑːnə/ MARR-ee-AH-nə; Chamorro: Manislan Mariånas), also simply the Marianas, are a crescent-shaped archipelago comprising the summits of fifteen longitudinally oriented, mostly dormant volcanic mountains in the north-western Pacific Ocean, between the 12th and 21st parallels north and along the 145th meridian east. They lie south-southeast of Japan, west-southwest of Hawaii, north of New Guinea, and east of the Philippines, demarcating the Philippine Sea's eastern limit. They are found in the northern part of the western Oceanic sub-region of Micronesia, and are politically divided into two jurisdictions of the United States: the Commonwealth of the Northern Mariana Islands and, at the southern end of the chain, the territory of Guam. The islands were named after the influential Spanish queen Mariana of Austria following their colonization in the 17th century.

The indigenous inhabitants are the Chamorro people. Archaeologists in 2013 reported findings which indicated that the people who first settled the Marianas arrived there after making what may have been at the time the longest uninterrupted ocean voyage in human history. They further reported findings which suggested that Tinian is likely to have been the first island in Oceania to have been settled by humans.

Spanish expeditions, beginning with one by Portuguese explorer Ferdinand Magellan in the early 16th century, were the first Europeans to arrive; eventually, Spain annexed and colonized the archipelago, establishing their capital on the largest island, Guam. The Marianas were the first islands Magellan encountered after traversing the Pacific from the southern tip of South America. The fruits found there saved the survivors from scurvy, which had already killed dozens of crewmembers.

== Geography ==
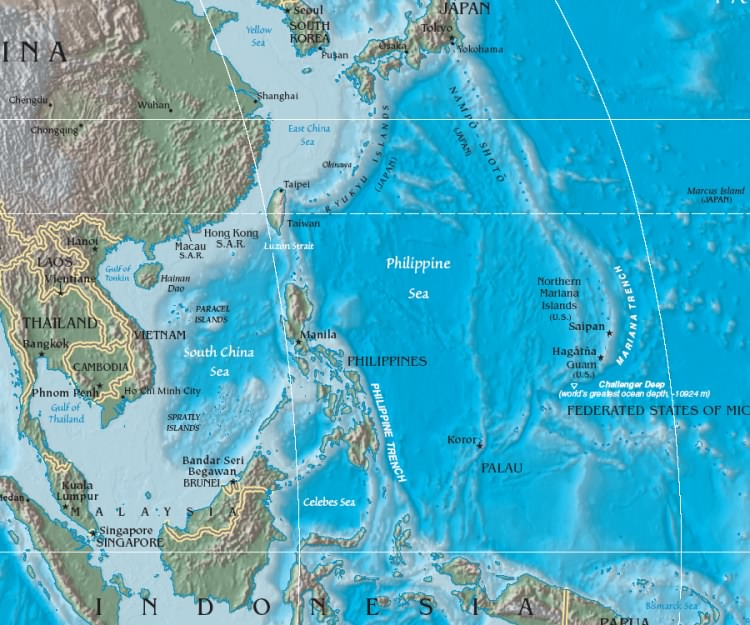
Geology of the west Pacific in the area of the Mariana Islands. The Mariana Islands are at map-right, east of the Philippine Sea and just west of the Mariana Trench in the ocean floor.

The Mariana Islands are the southern part of a submerged mountain range that extends 1,565 miles (2,519 km) from Guam to near Japan. Geographically, the Marianas are part of a larger region called Micronesia, situated between 13° and 21°N latitude and 144° and 146°E longitude. The Mariana Islands have a total land area of 1,008 km^{2} (389 sq mi).

The island chain geographically consists of two subgroups, a northern group of ten volcanic main islands, all of which are currently uninhabited, and a southern group of five coralline limestone islands (Rota, Guam, Aguijan, Tinian and Saipan), of which all but Aguijan are inhabited. In the northern volcanic group a maximum elevation of about 2,700 feet (820 m) is reached; there are craters showing signs of activity, and earthquakes are not uncommon. Coral reefs fringe the coasts of the southern isles, which are of slight elevation.

The lowest point on the Earth's crust, the Mariana Trench, is near the islands and is named after them.

The majority of islands in the Marianas still retain their indigenous names ending in the letters -an; for example, Guahan (the indigenous name of Guam), Agrigan, Agrihan, Aguihan/Aguigan, Pagan, Sarigan, Saipan, and Tinian.

== Political divisions ==
The Mariana Islands are composed of two administrative units:

- Guam, a United States territory
- the Northern Mariana Islands (including the islands of Saipan, Tinian and Rota), which make up a Commonwealth of the United States.

== Geology ==
The islands are part of a geologic structure known as the Izu–Bonin–Mariana Arc system. The island chain arose as a result of the western edge of the Pacific Plate moving westward and plunging downward below the Mariana plate, a region which is the most volcanically active convergent plate boundary on Earth. This subduction region, just east of the island chain, forms the noted Mariana Trench, the deepest part of the Earth's oceans and lowest part of the surface of the Earth's crust. In this region, according to geologic theory, water trapped in the extensive faulting of the Pacific Plate as serpentinite, is heated by the higher temperatures of depth during its subduction, the pressure from the expanding steam results in the hydrothermal activity in the area and the volcanic activity which formed the Mariana Islands.

== Ecology ==
Marianas tropical dry forests
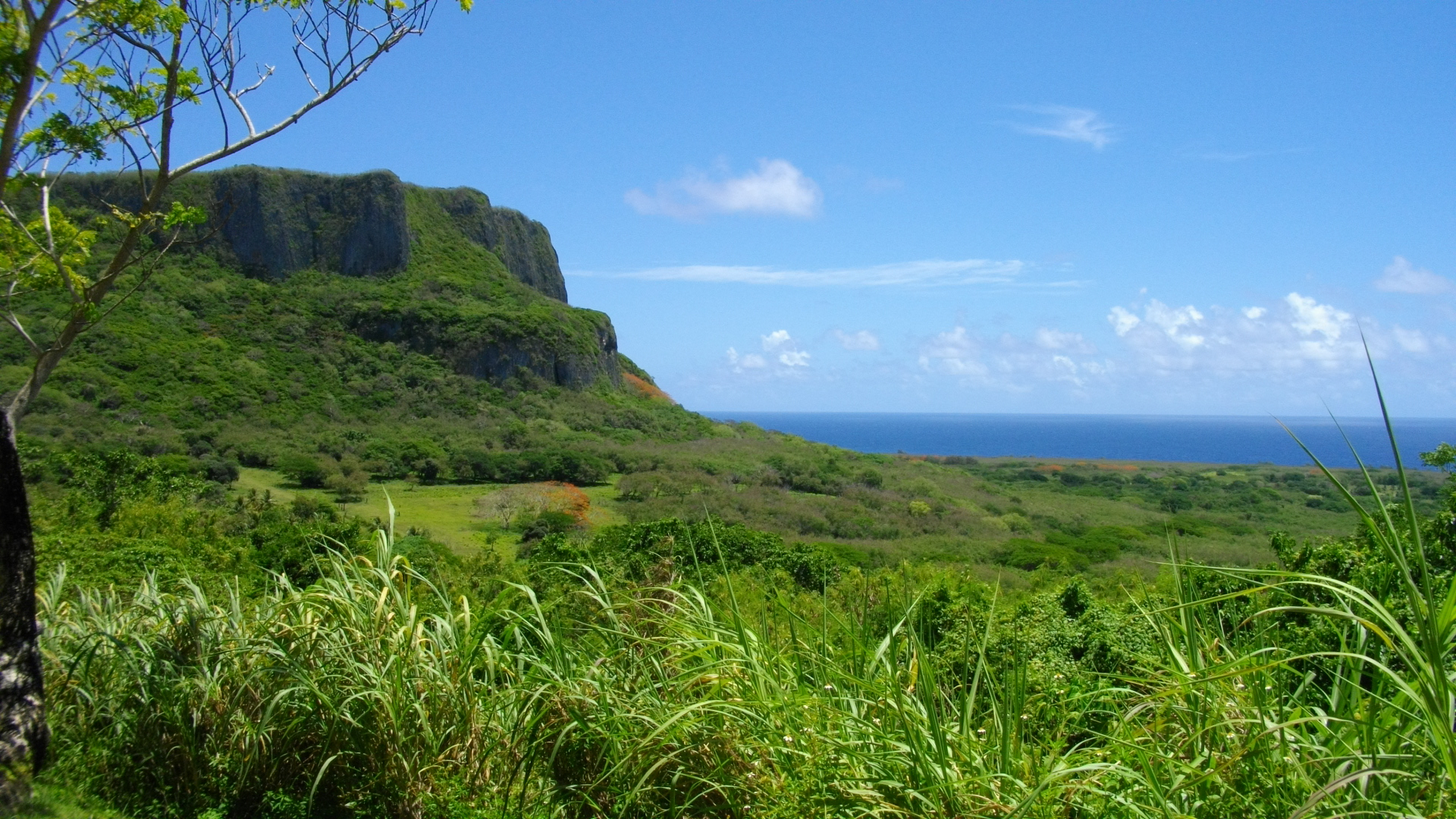
- Tropical dry forest on Saipan

Ecology
- Realm: Oceanian
- Biome: Tropical and subtropical dry broadleaf forests
- Bird species: 59
- Mammal species: 2

Geography
- Area: 1,036 km^{2} (400 mi^{2})
- Country: United States
- Territories: Guam and the Northern Mariana Islands

Conservation
- Conservation status: Critical/Endangered
- Habitat loss: 76.8%
- Protected: 1.11%

All the islands, except Farallon de Medinilla and Uracas or Farallon de Pajaros (in the northern group), are more or less densely forested, and the vegetation is dense, much resembling that of the Carolines and also of the Philippines, from where species of plants have been introduced. Owing to the moistness of the soil cryptogams are numerous, as are also most kinds of grasses. On most of the islands there is a plentiful supply of water.

The fauna of the Marianas, though inferior in number and variety, is similar in character to that of the Carolines and certain species are indigenous to both island groups. The climate though damp is healthy, while the heat, being tempered by the trade winds, is milder than that of the Philippines; the variations of temperature are not great.

== History ==
=== Early ===
The islands are part of a geologic structure known as the Izu–Bonin–Mariana Arc system. The islands are formed as the highly dense and very old western edge of the Pacific Plate plunges downward to form the floor of the Mariana Trench and carries trapped water under the Mariana plate as it does so. This water is super-heated as the plate is carried farther downward and results in the volcanic activity which has formed the arc of Mariana Islands above this subduction region.

Map showing the Neolithic Austronesian migrations into the islands of the Indo-Pacific

The Mariana Islands were the first islands settled by humans in Remote Oceania. Incidentally it is also the first and the longest of the ocean-crossing voyages of the Austronesian peoples into Remote Oceania, and is separate from the later Polynesian settlement of the rest of Remote Oceania. They were first settled around 1500 to 1400 BCE by migrants departing from the Philippines.

Archeological studies of human activity on the islands have revealed pottery with red-slipped, circle-stamped and punctate-stamped designs found in the Mariana Islands dating from between 1500 and 1400 BC. These artifacts show similar aesthetics to pottery found in Northern and Central Philippines, particularly Nagsabaran (Cagayan Valley) pottery, which flourished during the period between 2000 and 1300 BC.

Comparative and historical linguistics also indicate that the Chamorro language is most closely related to the Philippine subfamily of the Austronesian languages, instead of the Oceanic subfamily of the languages found in the rest of Remote Oceania.

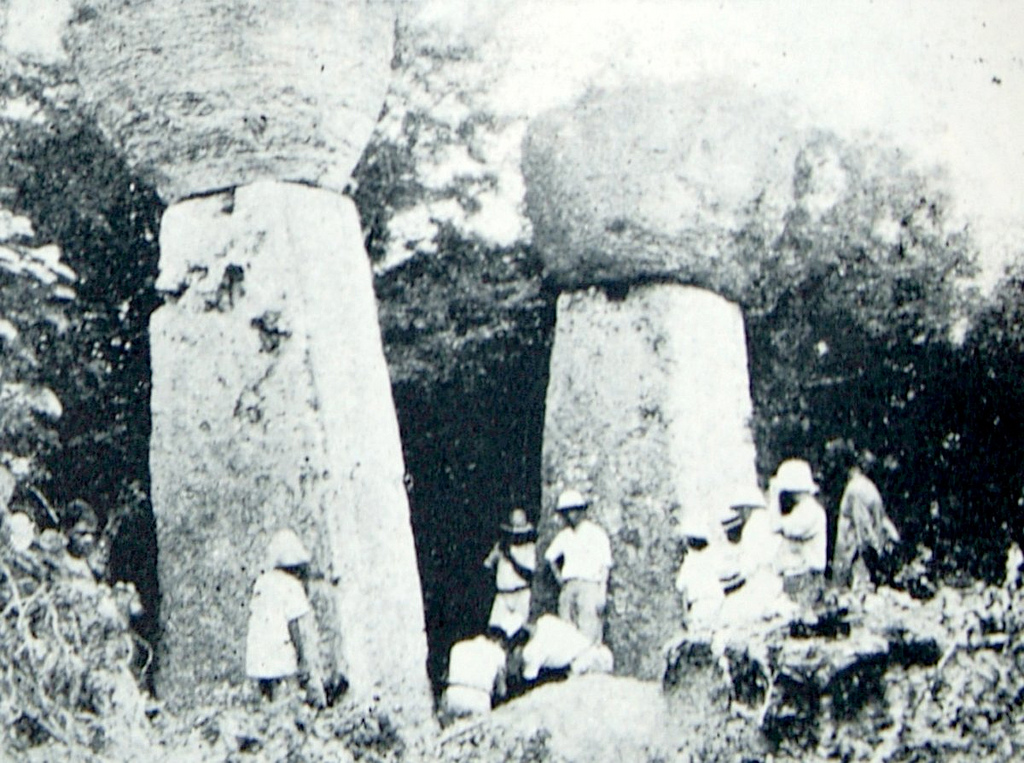
Ruins of Guma Taga on Tinian. The pillars/columns are called latte (pronounced læ'di) stones, a common architectural element of prehistoric structures in the Mariana Islands, upon which elevated buildings were built. Earthquakes had toppled the other latte at this site by the time this photo was taken; an earthquake in 1902 toppled the one seen on the left, and today only the one on the right remains standing.

Mitochondrial DNA and whole genome sequencing of the Chamorro people strongly support an ancestry from the Philippines. Genetic analysis of pre-Latte period skeletons in Guam also show that they do not have Australo-Melanesian ("Papuan") ancestry, which rules out origins from the Bismarck Archipelago, New Guinea, and eastern Indonesia. The Lapita culture itself (the ancestral branch of the Polynesian migrations) is younger than the first settlement of the Marianas (the earliest Lapita artifacts are dated to around 1350 to 1300 BCE), indicating that they originated from separate migration voyages.

Nevertheless, DNA analyses also show close genetic relationships between ancient settlers of the Marianas and early Lapita settlers in the Bismarck Archipelago. This may indicate that both the Lapita culture and the Marianas were settled from direct migrations from the Philippines, or that early settlers from the Marianas voyaged further southwards into the Bismarcks and reconnected with the Lapita people.

The Marianas also later established contact with and received migrations from the Caroline Islands at around the first millennium CE. This brought new pottery styles, languages, genes, and the hybrid Polynesian breadfruit.

The period 900 to 1700 CE of the Marianas, immediately before and during the Spanish colonization, is known as the Latte period. It is characterized by rapid cultural change, most notably by the massive megalithic latte stones (also spelled latde or latti). These were composed of the haligi pillars capped with another stone called tasa (which prevented rodents from climbing the posts). These served as supports for the rest of the structure which was made of wood. Remains of structures made with similar wooden posts have also been found. Human graves have also been found in front of latte structures, The Latte period was also characterized by the introduction of rice agriculture, which is unique in the pre-contact Pacific Islands.

The reasons for these changes is still unclear, but it is believed that it may have resulted from a third wave of migrants from Island Southeast Asia. Comparisons with other architectural traditions makes it likely that this third migration wave were again from the Philippines, or from eastern Indonesia (either Sulawesi or Sumba), all of which have a tradition of raised buildings with capstones. The word haligi ("pillar") is also used in various languages throughout the Philippines; while the Chamorro word guma ("house") closely resembles the Sumba word uma.

=== Spanish exploration and control ===
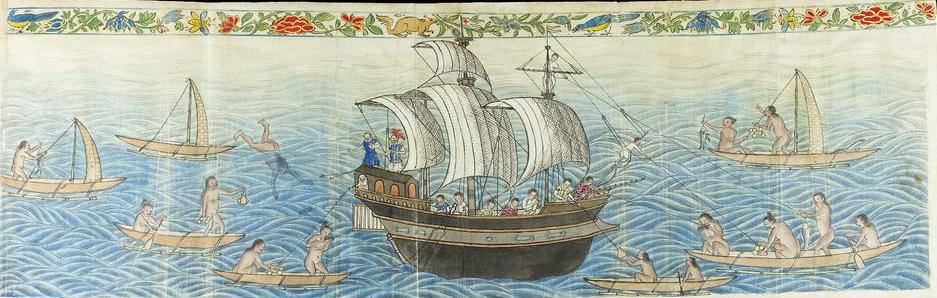
Reception of the Manila Galleon by the Chamorro in the Ladrones Islands, c. 1590 Boxer Codex

The first Europeans to see the island group were a Spanish expedition, who on March 6, 1521, observed a string of islands and sailed between two of them during a Spanish expedition of world circumnavigation under the command of Ferdinand Magellan. Historically, the southern village of Umatac, Guam has been credited as the site of the Spanish landing. As confirmation, a scholarly study of the navigator's diary, now kept in preservation in the Philippines, revealed a drawing of the islands with a tiny island to the south of a much larger island above it. The described placement of the islands confirms that Magellan had actually sailed between Guam and Cocos Island, and not Guam and Rota, as some originally thought, especially since the northern areas of Guam do not have safe coves or harbors to anchor. Moreover, the waters of Northern Guam are often rougher and the currents are even more treacherous in comparison to the safer coves and currents seen by the southwestern side of Guam.

Regardless of where they landed, the Spanish ships arrived in Guam and were unable to get fresh food as the inhabitants, Chamorros, "entered the ships and stole whatever they could lay their hands on", including "the small boat that was fastened to the poop of the flagship", according to Spanish crewman Antonio Pigafetta. The Spanish crew, in retaliation, attacked the Chamorros and dubbed the islands Islas de los Ladrones (Islands of the Thieves). Wrote Pigafetta, "Those people are poor, but ingenious and very thievish, on account of which we called those three islands the islands of Ladrones." Pigafetta writes,

And the captain-general wished to approach the largest of these three islands to replenish his provisions. But it was not possible, for the people of those islands entered the ships and robbed us so that we could not protect ourselves from them. And when we wished to strike and take in the sails so as to land, they stole very quickly the small boat called a skiff which was fastened to the poop of the captain's ship. At which he, being very angry, went ashore with forty armed men. And burning some forty or fifty houses with several boats and killing seven men of the said island, they recovered their skiff.

Pigafetta also described the boats the inhabitants used, including the sail shaped like a "lateen sail" (actually the crab claw sail), hence the name Islas de las Velas Latinas (Islands of the Lateen Sails), the name used as Magellan claimed them for the Spanish crown. San Lazarus archipelago, Jardines ('gardens') and Prazeres are among the names applied to them by later navigators.

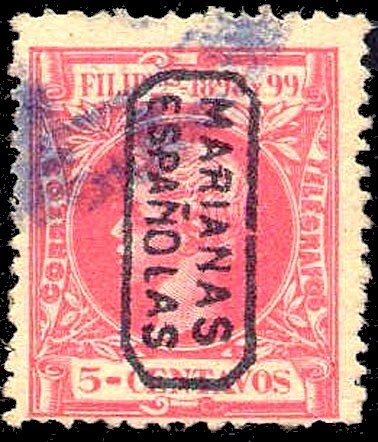
A stamp from the Marianas' late Spanish colonial period, 1898–1899

In 1667, Spain formally claimed them, established a regular colony there and in 1668 gave the islands the official title of Las Marianas, in honor of Spanish Queen Mariana of Austria, widow of King Philip IV of Spain and Queen Regent of the Spanish Empire ruling during the minority of her son King Charles II. They then had a population of more than 50,000 inhabitants. With the arrival of passengers and settlers aboard the Manila Galleons from the Americas, new diseases were introduced in the islands, which caused many deaths in the native Chamorro population. The native population, who referred to themselves as Taotao Tano (people of the land) but were known to the early Spanish colonists as Chamurres or HachaMori, eventually died out as a distinct people, though their descendants intermarried. At the Spanish occupation in 1668, the Chamorros were estimated at 50,000, but a century later only 1,800 natives remained, as the majority of the population was of mixed Spanish-Chamorro blood or mestizo. They were characteristic Micronesians, with a considerable civilization. On the island of Tinian are some remains attributed to them, consisting of two rows of massive square stone columns, about 5 feet 4 inches (1.63 m) broad and 14 feet (4.3 m) high, with heavy, round capitals called latte stones. According to early Spanish accounts cinerary urns were found embedded in the capitals.

When Spanish settlement started on 14 June 1668, they were subordinate to the Mexican colony (soon viceroyalty) of New Spain, until 1817, when they became subordinated to the Philippines, as part of the Spanish East Indies.

Research in the archipelago was carried out by Commodore Anson, who in August 1742 landed upon the island of Tinian. The Ladrones were visited by Byron in 1765, Wallis in 1767 and Julien Crozet in 1772.

The Marianas and specifically the island of Guam were a stopover for Spanish galleons en route from Acapulco, Mexico to Manila, Philippines in a convoy known as the Galeon de Manila. In the 1818 Spanish Census of the Spanish-Philippines, of which, the Marianas islands was under the governance of the Philippine Islands, it was recorded to have had 7,555 souls and of which there were 160 Spanish soldiers from Spain and Mexico, garrisoning the Marianas. Following the 1872 Cavite mutiny, several Filipinos were exiled to Guam, including the father of Pedro Paterno, Maximo Paterno, Dr. Antonio M. Regidor y Jurado and Jose Maria Basa.

The islands were a popular port of call for British and American whaling ships in the 19th century. The first such visit on record was that of the Resource to Guam in October 1799. The last known visit was made by the American whaler Charles W. Morgan in February 1904.

=== Loss from Spain and split in governance ===
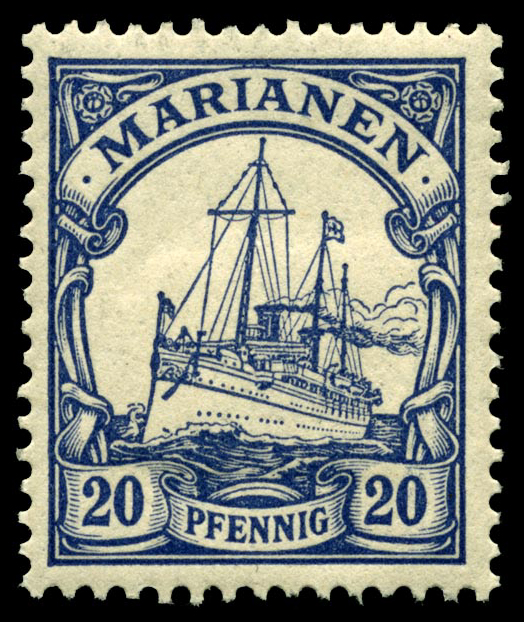
A 1901 stamp from the German-era Marianas

The Marianas remained a Spanish colony under the general government of the Philippines until 1898, when, as a result of its loss in the Spanish–American War, Spain ceded Guam to the United States. Guam has been separate from the Northern Marianas since this time. Following the Philippine–American War, Apolinario Mabini and other Filipino leaders were exiled to Guam in 1901.

Weakened from its defeat in the Spanish–American War, Spain could no longer effectively control and protect the nearly 6,000 islands it retained throughout Micronesia, including the Northern Marianas, Carolines and Pelew Islands. Therefore, Spain entered into the German-Spanish Treaty of February 12, 1899 to sell the Northern Marianas and its other remaining islands to Germany for 837,500 German gold marks (about US$4,100,000 at the time). The Northern Marianas and other island groups were incorporated by Germany as a small part of the larger German Protectorate of New Guinea. The total population in the Northern Marianas portion of these islands was only 2,646 inhabitants around this time, with the ten most northerly islands being actively volcanic and thus mostly uninhabited.

Japan, allied with the Entente Powers during World War I, seized all of Germany's colonial possessions in East Asia and Micronesia, including the Northern Mariana Islands, and held them through the end of the war. Under the terms of the Treaty of Versailles in 1919, Germany was stripped of all her colonies worldwide, including the Palau, Caroline, Northern Mariana and Marshall Islands. By international agreement, these were all placed into trusteeship under the management of the League of Nations which assigned them to Japan as the Class C South Seas Mandate. During this time, Japan used some of the islands for sugarcane production, modestly increasing the population of a few of the islands.

=== World War II ===
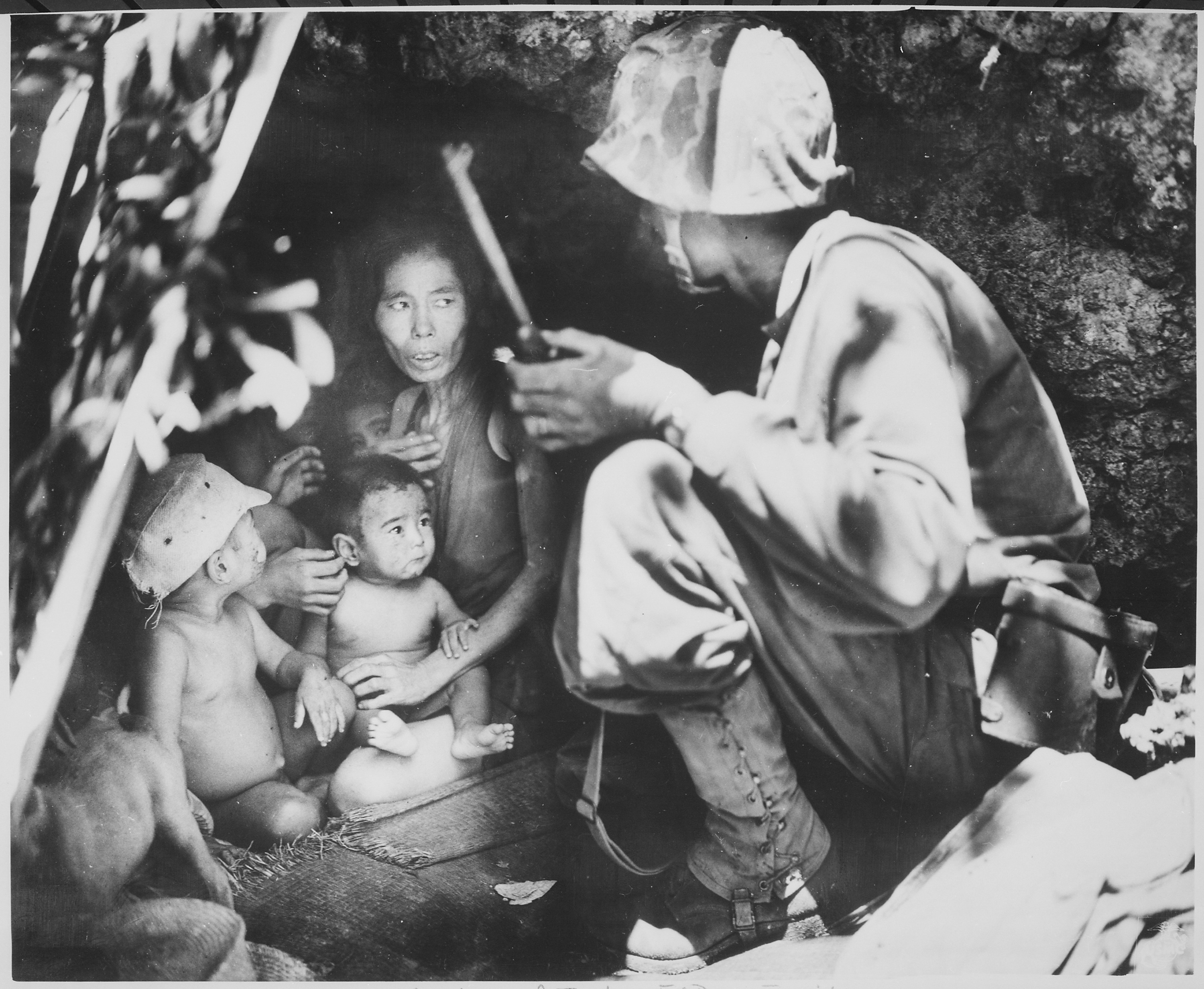
U.S. Marine First Lieutenant Robert B. Sheeks talks a terrified Chamorro woman and her children into abandoning their refuge. Battle of Saipan, 1944.

The island chain saw significant fighting during World War II. Guam, a possession of the United States since 1898, was captured by Japan in an attack from the Northern Mariana Islands that began on the day of the Japanese attack on Pearl Harbor (December 8, 1941, the same time as the Pearl Harbor attack across the International Date Line). In 1944, the United States captured the Mariana Islands chain from Japan: the Northern Mariana Islands were desired by the U.S. as bombing bases to reach the Japanese mainland, with the invasion of Saipan being launched for that reason in June before the U.S. even moved to recapture Guam; a month later the U.S. recaptured Guam and captured Tinian. Once captured, Saipan and Tinian's islands were used extensively by the United States military as they finally put mainland Japan within a round-trip range of American B-29 bombers. In response, Japanese forces attacked the bases on Saipan and Tinian from November 1944 to February 1945. At the same time and afterwards, the United States Army Air Forces based on these islands conducted an intense strategic bombing campaign against the Japanese cities of military and industrial importance, including Tokyo, Nagoya, Osaka, Kobe, and others. Both US bombers the Enola Gay and the Bockscar (which dropped atomic bombs on Hiroshima and Nagasaki, respectively) flew their missions from Tinian's North Field.

According to Werner Gruhl: "Mariana Island historians estimate that 10 percent of Guam's approximately 20,000 population were killed by violence, most by the Japanese Imperial Army and Navy."

=== Post-World War II ===
The direct result of World War II on the Mariana Islands was that, after the war, the Northern Mariana Islands came under the control of the United States in the same way they had earlier come under the control of Japan after World War I. However, this time they became part of the U.S.-administered Trust Territory of the Pacific Islands (TTPI) established pursuant to Security Council Resolution 21. The Commonwealth of the Northern Mariana Islands later became a U.S. territory following its exit from the TTPI pursuant to Security Council Resolution 683. Although now both under U.S. control, the Northern Mariana Islands are separate from Guam. Efforts at reunification have failed in part due to residual post-war tensions resulting from the very different histories of Guam (occupied by Japan for only 31 months, in wartime) and the Northern Mariana Islands (more peacefully occupied by Japan, for about 30 years).

== List of islands (from north to south) ==
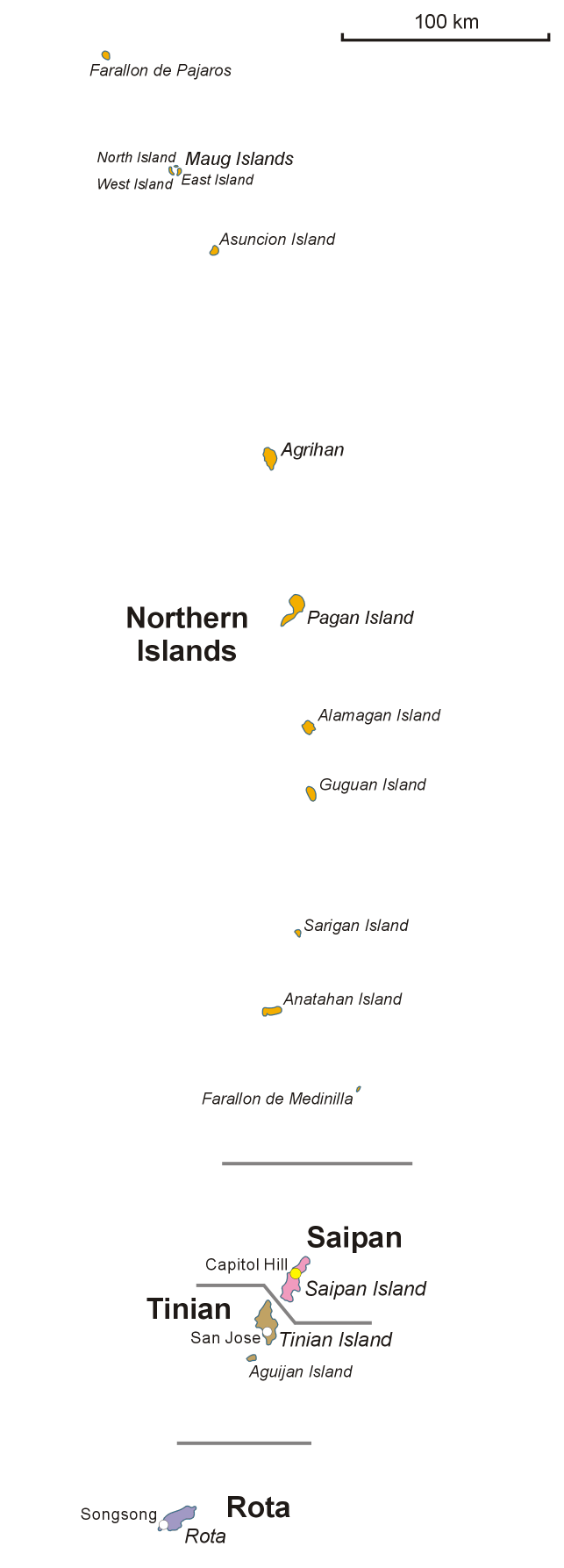
Map of the Northern Mariana Islands divided into their administrative municipalities

Island name	Population (2020 census)	Territory	Administrative divisions
Farallon de Pajaros (Uracus)	0	Commonwealth of the Northern Mariana Islands (CNMI) (unincorporated territory and commonwealth of the USA) Population: 47,329	Municipality of Northern Islands Population: 7
Maug Islands	0	Commonwealth of the Northern Mariana Islands (CNMI) (unincorporated territory and commonwealth of the USA) Population: 47,329	Municipality of Northern Islands Population: 7
Asuncion	0	Commonwealth of the Northern Mariana Islands (CNMI) (unincorporated territory and commonwealth of the USA) Population: 47,329	Municipality of Northern Islands Population: 7
Agrihan	4	Commonwealth of the Northern Mariana Islands (CNMI) (unincorporated territory and commonwealth of the USA) Population: 47,329	Municipality of Northern Islands Population: 7
Pagan	2	Commonwealth of the Northern Mariana Islands (CNMI) (unincorporated territory and commonwealth of the USA) Population: 47,329	Municipality of Northern Islands Population: 7
Alamagan	1	Commonwealth of the Northern Mariana Islands (CNMI) (unincorporated territory and commonwealth of the USA) Population: 47,329	Municipality of Northern Islands Population: 7
Guguan	0	Commonwealth of the Northern Mariana Islands (CNMI) (unincorporated territory and commonwealth of the USA) Population: 47,329	Municipality of Northern Islands Population: 7
Papaungan		Commonwealth of the Northern Mariana Islands (CNMI) (unincorporated territory and commonwealth of the USA) Population: 47,329	Municipality of Northern Islands Population: 7
Sarigan	0	Commonwealth of the Northern Mariana Islands (CNMI) (unincorporated territory and commonwealth of the USA) Population: 47,329	Municipality of Northern Islands Population: 7
Anatahan	0	Commonwealth of the Northern Mariana Islands (CNMI) (unincorporated territory and commonwealth of the USA) Population: 47,329	Municipality of Northern Islands Population: 7
Farallon de Medinilla	0	Commonwealth of the Northern Mariana Islands (CNMI) (unincorporated territory and commonwealth of the USA) Population: 47,329	Municipality of Northern Islands Population: 7
Saipan	43,385	Commonwealth of the Northern Mariana Islands (CNMI) (unincorporated territory and commonwealth of the USA) Population: 47,329	Municipality of Saipan
Tinian	2,044	Commonwealth of the Northern Mariana Islands (CNMI) (unincorporated territory and commonwealth of the USA) Population: 47,329	Municipality of Tinian
Aguijan	0	Commonwealth of the Northern Mariana Islands (CNMI) (unincorporated territory and commonwealth of the USA) Population: 47,329	Municipality of Tinian
Rota	1,893	Commonwealth of the Northern Mariana Islands (CNMI) (unincorporated territory and commonwealth of the USA) Population: 47,329	Municipality of Rota
Guam	153,836	Guam (territory of the USA)	19 villages of Guam

In addition, the Esmeralda Bank, Ruby Seamount, and Supply Reef are submarine landforms in the Mariana archipelago.

== Tourism ==
Tourism in the Northern Marianas is split mainly between Filipino, Japanese, American, Korean, Taiwanese, and Chinese tourists. There are several large tour operators in Saipan that cater to Asian tourists coming to the island. By far, the majority of tourism in the Marianas is in Guam. Several flights a day land in Guam, mostly in the early hours between 1:00 AM and 3:30 AM. With the close of the garment industries in the Northern Marianas, tourism has grown slowly and is now a major part of the economy. Many businesses on the islands rely on purchases from tourists, many of which are from East Asia. However, the COVID-19 pandemic has severely taken a toll on tourism and the variety of nationalities arriving on the islands has rapidly dwindled, making Korean visitors comprise a large majority of tourist arrivals. Guam and the Northern Mariana Islands have reported a 55.6% and 53% decrease in visitors between calendar years 2019 and 2024 respectively. Adding to the decline in tourism is the delay of electronic travel authorizations for Chinese tourists, which is another major blow to the "already crumbling economy" of the Mariana Islands. There is progress to combat the tourism decline, including plans such as the 2 year, $60 million tourist recovery plan backed by Guam governor Lou Leon Guerrero and envisioned by the Guam Visitors Bureau.

== Cuisine ==
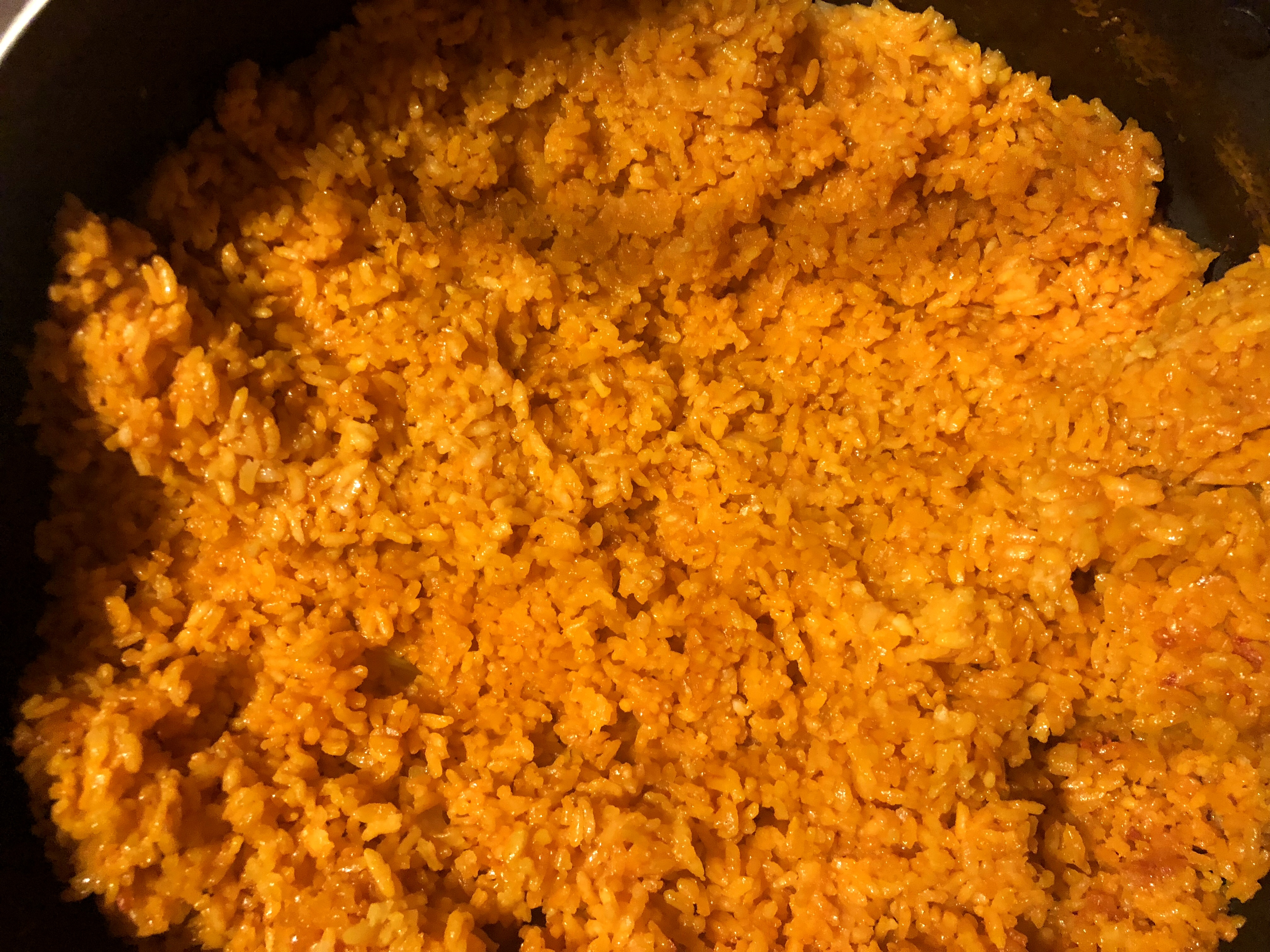
Chamorro red rice

Common dishes in the Mariana Islands include red rice, meat or poultry on the grill or in coconut milk, chicken kelaguen, apigigi (young coconut with cassava paste wrapped in banana leaf), and tropical fruits.

== See also ==
- Rail transport on the Mariana Islands
- Apostolic Prefecture of Mariana Islands
- Lists of islands
- Marianas tropical dry forest
- List of endemic plants in the Mariana Islands
- List of birds of the Northern Mariana Islands
- List of mammals of the Northern Mariana Islands
- Mariana Trench
