= Twin Buttes =

Twin Buttes may refer to one of the following:

- Twin Buttes, Arizona, a ghost town in Pima County, Arizona
- Twin Buttes (California), volcanic cinder cones in California
- Twin Buttes, North Dakota, an unincorporated community in Dunn County, North Dakota
- Twin Buttes Reservoir, an artificial lake in Texas

== See also ==
- Twin Butte, Alberta
