= Roundtop Mountain (Alaska) =

Stratovolcano in Alaska, United States

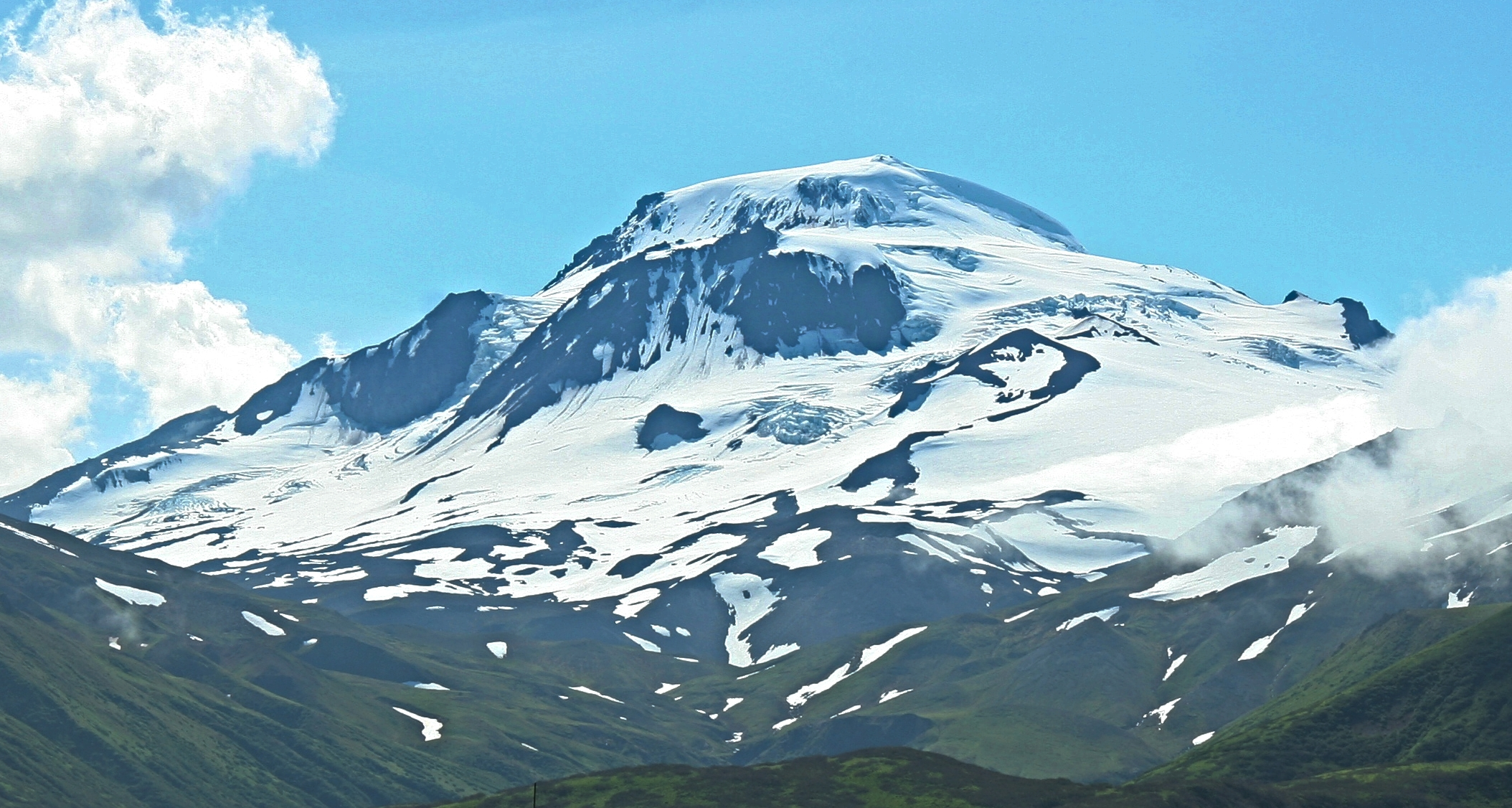
- East aspect from False Pass

Highest point
- Elevation: 6,100 ft (1,900 m)
- Prominence: 3,000 ft (910 m)
- Coordinates: 54°47′52″N 163°35′45″W

Geography
- Location within Alaska
- Location: Alaska, United States
- Parent range: Aleutian Range
- Topo map: USGS False Pass D-5

Geology
- Mountain type: Stratovolcano
- Volcanic arc: Aleutian Arc
- Last eruption: 9,100–10,000 years ago

Roundtop Mountain is a stratovolcano located on the Aleutian island of Unimak in the U.S. state of Alaska. Its last eruption was sometime between 9,100 and 10,000 years ago. This geographic feature was first called "Dome" in 1897 by Lieutenant Commander J. F. Moser, of the U.S. Navy. Its name was reported as "Round Top" by the United States Coast and Geodetic Survey in 1902. Isanotski Peaks, the nearest higher neighbor, is positioned 5.9 mi (9 km) to the west-southwest.

== See also ==
- List of mountain peaks of Alaska
- List of volcanoes in the United States
