= Double Glacier Volcano =

Extinct volcano in Alaska, US

Coordinates: 60.6755°N 152.6635°W

Double Glacier Volcano is an extinct volcano poking up in Double Glacier. The exposed portion is about 1.4 miles (2.3 km) long and 1,410 feet (430 m) above the Double Glacier. Its elevation is 4,839 feet (1,475 m). It was discovered about 1992. It is about 109 miles (175 km) southwest of Anchorage, Alaska. It is just north of Redoubt Volcano and between Redoubt and Mount Spurr in the Aleutian Range.

Double Glacier Volcano lava dome complex of Pleistocene age forms a nunatak in Double Glacier. K–Ar dating of the complex indicates that it formed 627,000 to 887,000 years ago.
