= East Diamante =

Submarine volcano in the Northern Mariana Islands

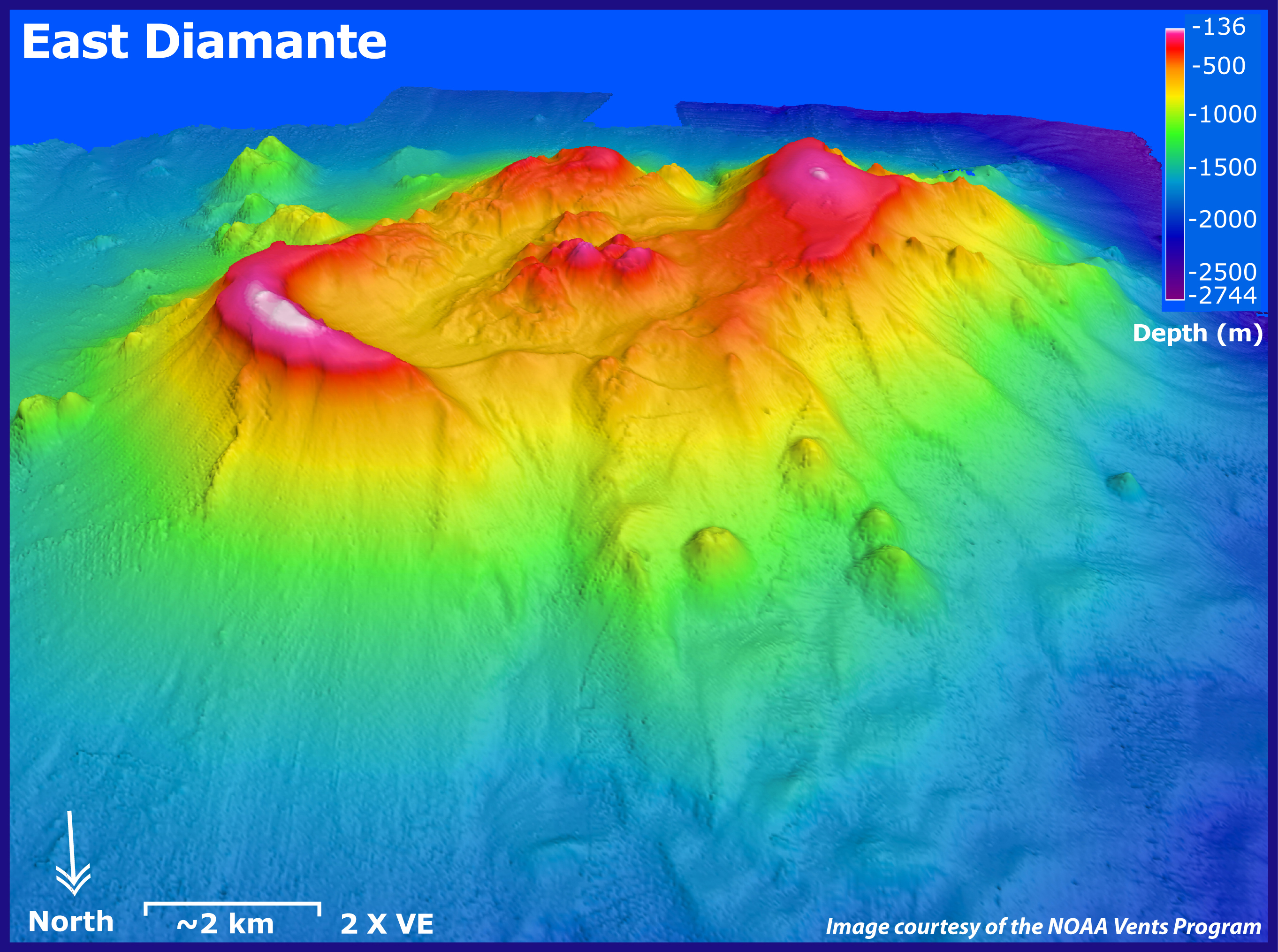
- Bathymetic image of East Diamante as viewed from the north/northeast

- Location within Northern Mariana Islands Location within North Pacific
- Summit depth: −127 m (−417 ft)

Location
- Location: Northern Mariana Islands
- Coordinates: 15.93°N 145.67°E
- Country: United States

Geology
- Type: Submarine volcano
- Volcanic arc/chain: Izu–Bonin–Mariana Arc
- Last eruption: Unknown

East Diamante is a submarine volcano located 43 km (27 mi) south of Anatahan in the Northern Mariana Islands of the northwestern Pacific Ocean. It forms part of the Izu–Bonin–Mariana Arc and is hydrothermally active, containing a complex, elongated caldera at its summit.

== Geology ==
East Diamante is one of two submarine volcanoes in the southern Izu–Bonin–Mariana Arc that have erupted felsic magmas, the other being Zealandia Bank. Dacite is the primary rock type and generally has a porphyritic texture, with phenocrysts embedded in a matrix of quartz, plagioclase, clinopyroxene, orthopyroxene and iron-titanium oxides. The phenocrysts account for up to 41% of the total rock volume.

The summit of East Diamante lies 127 m (417 ft) below sea level and is truncated by an elongated, northeast–southwest-trending caldera. Formation of the caldera was followed by the emplacement of a central dome complex and the construction of a volcanic cone on the southwest caldera rim. The central dome complex displays hydrothermal activity, including black smokers.

Argon–argon dating of dacite from inside the caldera has given an age of 20,000 ± 4000 years, indicating that the volcano was active in the Late Pleistocene. Volcanism continued into the Holocene, but the age of the last eruption is unknown.

== See also ==
- List of volcanoes in the United States
