= Bering Sea Volcanic Province =

Volcanic fields in Alaska, United States

Coordinates: 63.1411°N 164.2936°W

The Bering Sea Volcanic Province, also called the Bering Sea Basalt Province, is a group of volcanic fields in western Alaska, United States.

== Sites ==
- Imuruk Lake volcanic field
- Teller volcanic field
- St. George Island
- St. Lawrence Island
- Nunivak Island
- St. Michael volcanic field
