= Mount Gordon =

Mountain in Alaska, United States

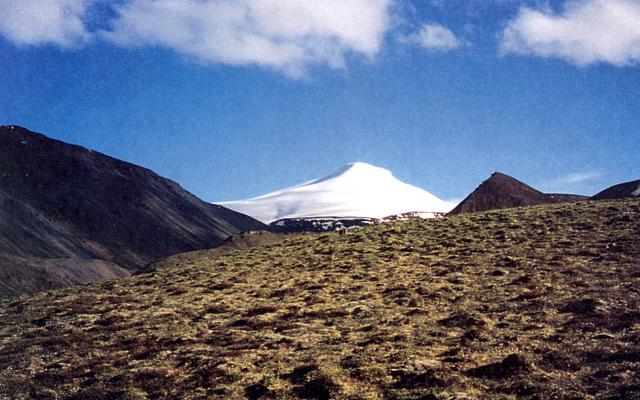
- Mount Gordon

Highest point
- Elevation: 9,040 ft (2,760 m)
- Prominence: 2,018 ft (615 m)
- Listing: Volcanoes in the United States
- Coordinates: 62.1312°N 143.0883°W

Geography
- Location within Alaska
- Location: Valdez-Cordova Census Area, Alaska, United States
- Parent range: Wrangell Mountains
- Topo map: USGS Nabesna A-5 NE

Geology
- Rock age: Pleistocene
- Mountain type: Cinder cone

Mount Gordon is a cinder cone in the Wrangell Mountains of eastern Alaska, United States, located between Nabesna Glacier and the stratovolcano Mount Drum. It is the most prominent of a group of Pleistocene and Holocene cinder cones, most of which are less than 100 m (330 ft) high. The exact age of Mount Gordon remains unknown. The mountain was named after a local prospector who was in the area in 1899.
