= Brushy Butte =

Shield volcano in northern California, United States

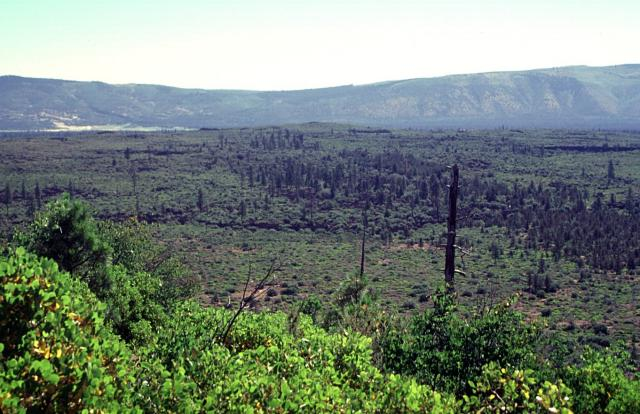

Highest point
- Elevation: 3,852 ft (1,174 m)
- Coordinates: 41°10′41″N 121°26′35″W

Geography
- Location: Shasta County, California, U.S.
- Parent range: Cascade Range

Geology
- Rock age: Pleistocene
- Mountain type: Shield volcano
- Volcanic arc: Cascade Volcanic Arc
- Last eruption: Pleistocene

Brushy Butte is a small, poorly studied, shield volcano located immediately east of Timbered Crater, south-southeast of the Medicine Lake Highlands in northern California, U.S. (near where Siskiyou County, California is adjacent to Shasta County, California). This volcano is considered to have formed soil development and a degree of revegetation similar to that of Hat Creek flow. There is no current information on any Holocene eruptions from Brushy Butte, the last known eruption for the Brushy Butte was in the Pleistocene age, and the eruption was considered to be over 10-20 years, this was found based on the different lava flow landforms created and their placement around the interior of the volcano.. Brushy Butte is located in a rifting area and the type of magma that erupted is called tholeiitic basalt; a type of lava that is dark and it contains 45 to 53 percent of silica, rich in iron and magnesium.

== See also ==
- List of volcanoes in the United States of America
- Cascade Volcanoes
