= Double Glacier =

Glacier in Alaska

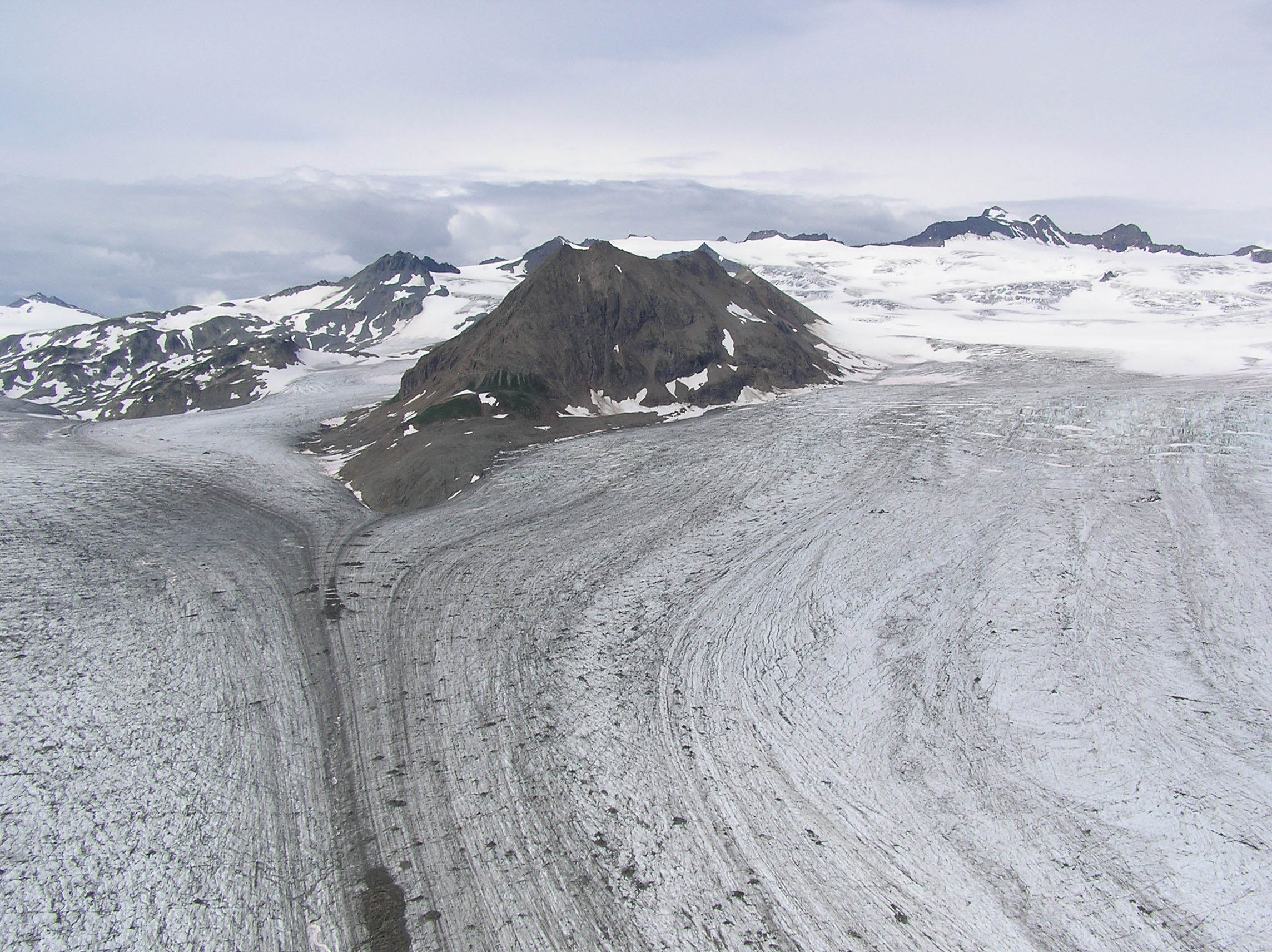
- Double Glacier

- Location within Alaska
- Interactive map of Double Glacier
- Location: Kenai Peninsula Borough, Alaska, U.S.
- Coordinates: 60°41′18″N 152°31′57″W
- Length: 11 mi (18 km)
- Highest elevation: 3,491 ft (1,064 m)

Double Glacier is an 11 mi (18 km) long glacier in the Kenai Peninsula Borough of Alaska, located 47 mi (76 km) west-northwest of Kenai. As its name suggests, Double Glacier is divided into two lobes.

Double Glacier is the largest glacier contained within Lake Clark National Park with an area of 137 km2 and is in retreat. In the 2009 Redoubt volcano eruption the entire glacier was covered by ash.

Double Glacier Volcano lava dome complex of Pleistocene age forms a nunatak in Double Glacier. K–Ar dating of the complex indicates that it formed 627,000 to 887,000 years ago.

== See also ==
- List of glaciers in the United States
- List of volcanoes in the United States
