= Kookooligit Mountains =

Mountain in Alaska, United States

Highest point
- Elevation: 2,208 ft (673 m)
- Listing: List of volcanoes in the United States
- Coordinates: 63°35′38″N 170°22′56″W

Geography
- Location: St. Lawrence Island, Alaska, United States

Geology
- Rock age: Holocene
- Mountain type: Shield volcano
- Last eruption: Unknown

The Kookooligit Mountains are a volcanic mountain range on north-central St. Lawrence Island in the U.S. state of Alaska. They consist of a 30 km (19 mi) long and 40 km (25 mi) wide shield volcano capped with over 100 smaller volcanic cones. The volcanic cones are composed primarily of alkali olivine basalts, olivine tholeiite, and basanite.
