= St. Michael volcanic field =

Volcanic field in Alaska, United States

Highest point
- Elevation: 2,346 ft (715 m)
- Listing: List of volcanoes in the United States of America
- Coordinates: 63.45°N 162.12°W

Geography
- Location: Alaska, United States

Geology
- Rock age: Holocene
- Mountain type: Volcanic field
- Last eruption: 3,000 years

The St. Michael volcanic field is a volcanic field located on St. Michael and Stuart Islands in western Alaska, United States. It contains 55 cones and craters, including low broad shield volcanoes and maars. It is considered part of the Bering Sea Volcanic Province.

While there are no written records of eruptions in recent history, Eskimo elders have an account of the mountains smoking in the region. The oldest Eskimo settlements in Western Alaska date to around 200-500 BC, so mountains in the St. Michael volcanic field likely erupted sometime within the last 3,000 years.

== Volcanoes ==
Volcanoes within the St. Michael volcanic field include:

- Crater Mountain
- The Sisters
- St. Michael Mountain
- Stephens Hill
- Stuart Hill
- West Hill

== See also ==
- List of volcanic fields
