= Big Cave =

Mountain in United States of America

- Location within California

Highest point
- Elevation: 4,130 or 4,131 ft (1,259 or 1,259 m)
- Coordinates: 40°57′18″N 121°21′54″W

Geography
- Location: Shasta County, California, United States
- Parent range: Cascade Range

Geology
- Formed by: Subduction zone volcanism
- Rock age: Pleistocene or Holocene
- Mountain type: Shield volcano
- Volcanic arc: Cascade Volcanic Arc
- Last eruption: unknown

Big Cave is a small shield volcano in Northern California, United States, located in the Cascade Volcanic Arc of the Pacific Northwest. With an elevation listed at either 4,130 feet (1,260 m) or 4,131 feet (1,259 m), it is the product of subduction of several tectonic plates under the North American Plate, which continues at a rate of 4 centimetres (1.6 in) each year.

Big Cave has a basaltic composition, with a rough surface texture, and has been covered by lava flows. Located between Big Lake to the north and Bald Mountain to the south, it forms part of a belt of Late Quaternary volcanoes moving north from the Lassen Peak volcano. It last erupted either during the late Pleistocene or Holocene epoch; its exact age is unknown. It does not possess any major subfeatures besides young pyroclastic cones on its northern flank and on its summit.

== Geography ==
Big Cave lies to the south of Big Lake but north of Bald Mountain. Sources differ on its exact height, listing an elevation of 4,130 feet (1,260 m) or 4,131 feet (1,259 m).

== Geology ==
The Cascade Range has been active for about 36 million years, largely as a result of the subduction through convergence of the Juan de Fuca tectonic plate with the North American Plate, which persists at a rate of 4 centimetres (1.6 in) annually. Cascade volcanism has occurred intermittently; there are volcanic rocks that are probably unrelated to subduction dating to between 55 million and 42 million years ago, with the most recent activity starting roughly 5 million years ago. In the Cascade Volcanic Arc, volcanism during the Holocene epoch spans the Garibaldi Volcanic Belt in southern British Columbia in Canada to the Lassen Peak volcanic complex in northern California. However, along the arc, volcanism shows profound differences. South of Crater Lake in Oregon, the belt bends in southeastern direction until reaching Lassen Peak. The eastern boundary of the Southern Cascades known as the Hat Creek Graben region is cut by many faults and incorporates several tectonic provinces and volcanoes. It also resides at the transition zone between the subducting Gorda tectonic plate, which is also moving under the North American Plate, the Klamath Mountain Region where the Earth's crust is shortening, and an area of normal faults. In this region, more than 500 volcanic vents have erupted in the past 7 million years. In California, volcanoes like Lassen Peak and Mount Shasta occur among rings of mafic (rich in magnesium and iron) shield volcanoes and volcanic fields such as the Medicine Lake Volcano.

Big Cave lies at the northern end of a belt of late, Quaternary volcanoes moving north from Lassen Peak. It is a small shield volcano, likely formed during the Holocene epoch, though scientists from the United States Geological Survey are unsure. It could also be from the late Pleistocene epoch; M. A. Clynne thought it may be of similar age to the nearby Cinder Butte volcano, at 38,000 ± 7,000 years. The volcano consists of basaltic lava and has pyroclastic cones at its summit and northern side. It has a low, "inconspicuous" profile, and is surrounded by a large lava field. Covered with lava flows, it also has a rough surface, and lacks any other major known subfeatures.

== See also ==
- List of volcanoes in the United States
- Cascade Volcanoes
