= Ingakslugwat Hills =

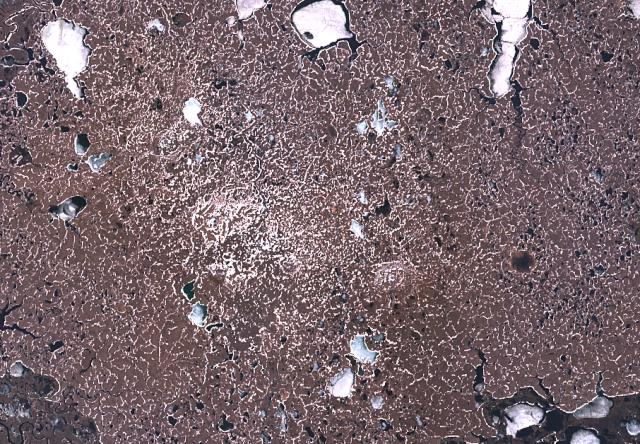
- Landsat image

Highest point
- Elevation: 623 ft (190 m)
- Listing: List of volcanoes in the United States of America
- Coordinates: 61°22′13″N 163°59′13″W

Geography
- Location: Alaska, United States

Geology
- Rock age: Holocene
- Mountain type: Cinder cones
- Last eruption: Unknown

The Ingakslugwat Hills volcanic field is in the Yukon–Kuskokwim Delta in western Alaska. It contains eight large craters and about thirty small pyroclastic cones in an area of some 500 km^{2}. The field contains unusual so-called "Ingakslugwat volcanoes", volcanic ridges up to 7 kilometres (4.3 mi) long and 400 metres (1,300 ft) high which are formed by pyroclastic material. They most likely formed by the interaction of permafrost with magma, seeing as they have a hydrovolcanic nature despite being high above the water table.

The field is located 35 miles (56 km) north of Baird Inlet. The volcanoes rise 600 feet (180 m) over the surrounding plains and often contain small crater lakes. The height of the cones ranges 8–190 metres (26–623 ft). The volcanoes were active between 1 million and 700,000 years ago, but the latest activity may be of Holocene age. The volcanoes are formed by basaltic rocks. Other Quaternary volcanic centres in the region are Nelson Island and the Kusilvak Mountains.

Olivine basalt is the principal volcanic rock but basanite and nephelinite are also found.
