= Fukujin (volcano) =

Active submarine volcano in the Mariana Islands

- Summit depth: −217 m (−712 ft)

Location
- Range: Mariana volcanic arc
- Coordinates: 21.93°N 143.47°E
- Country: United States

Geology
- Type: Stratovolcanoes
- Last eruption: 1974

Fukujin is an active submarine volcano of the Mariana Volcanic Arc that last erupted in 1974. The summit is located about 217 m (712 ft) beneath the ocean surface, although in 1977, it was measured at 70 m (230 ft) and a shoal depth of 3 m (9.8 ft) was obtained in 1980. No minimum depth has been recorded as the presumably shallow depth poses a risk to ships. It measures 40 km (25 mi) across. Volcanic activity in the 1970s is believed to be centered along a southwestern flank vent at 1,200 m (3,900 ft) depth.

== See also ==
- Kasuga 2
- List of volcanoes in the United States
