= Door Point Volcano =

Extinct volcano near Louisiana coast

Coordinates: 30.1°N 89.1°W

The Door Point Volcano is a buried extinct volcano off the shore of St. Bernard Parish, Louisiana. It last erupted in the late Cretaceous period, between 74 and 90 million years ago. It was discovered in a drill core at approximately 8000' depth beneath the sea floor. The volcano is a sill composed of layers of volcanic ash and breccia. The structure and crystallization of the rock indicates that it was a complex, submarine volcano. Door Point Volcano was discovered in 1963 by Shell Oil Company in an exploratory oil well drilling. It is the only known volcanic structure in the northern and western Gulf of Mexico. It is thought to be Louisiana's only volcanic structure.
