= Pipkin (volcano) =

Dormant volcano in California, United States

Coordinates: 34°41′12″N 116°37′12″W

Pipkin / Malpais Crater

Geology
- Mountain type: Cinder Cone
- Volcanic arc: Lavic Lake volcanic field
- Last eruption: c. 600,000 years BP

Pipkin (also known as Malpais Crater) is a volcano in California, with activity during the Quaternary. The surface of erupted lava flows is weathered, and argon-argon dating and potassium-argon dating has yielded ages of 770,000 ± 40,000 and c. 600,000 years before present, respectively.

The volcano lies in the Rodman Mountains. The 300 feet (91 m) high and 2,000 feet (610 m) wide Pipkin cinder cone probably erupted the lava flows which extend to its north and form a lava flow field which has the appearance of a mesa. The cone itself consists of lava bombs and scoria with red and black colours. Lava flows from the vent propagated through Kane Wash and into the Mojave River valley; it is possible that the lava diverted part of the wash into neighbouring Sheep Springs Wash.

The cone is the site of a quarry. Pipkin was mined since the 1950s for its ash.
