= Mount Sergief =

Stratovolcano in Alaska, United States

- Location within Alaska

Highest point
- Elevation: 1,837 m (6,027 ft)
- Coordinates: 52°03′12″N 174°57′08″W

Geography
- Location: Alaska, United States

Geology
- Mountain type: Stratovolcano
- Volcanic arc: Aleutian Arc
- Last eruption: Pleistocene

Mount Sergief is a stratovolcano located on the Aleutian island of Atka in the U.S. state of Alaska. Its highest point is 1,837 ft (560 m) above sea level.

Its last eruption was during the Pleistocene.
