= Isanotski Peaks =

Mountain in Alaska, United States

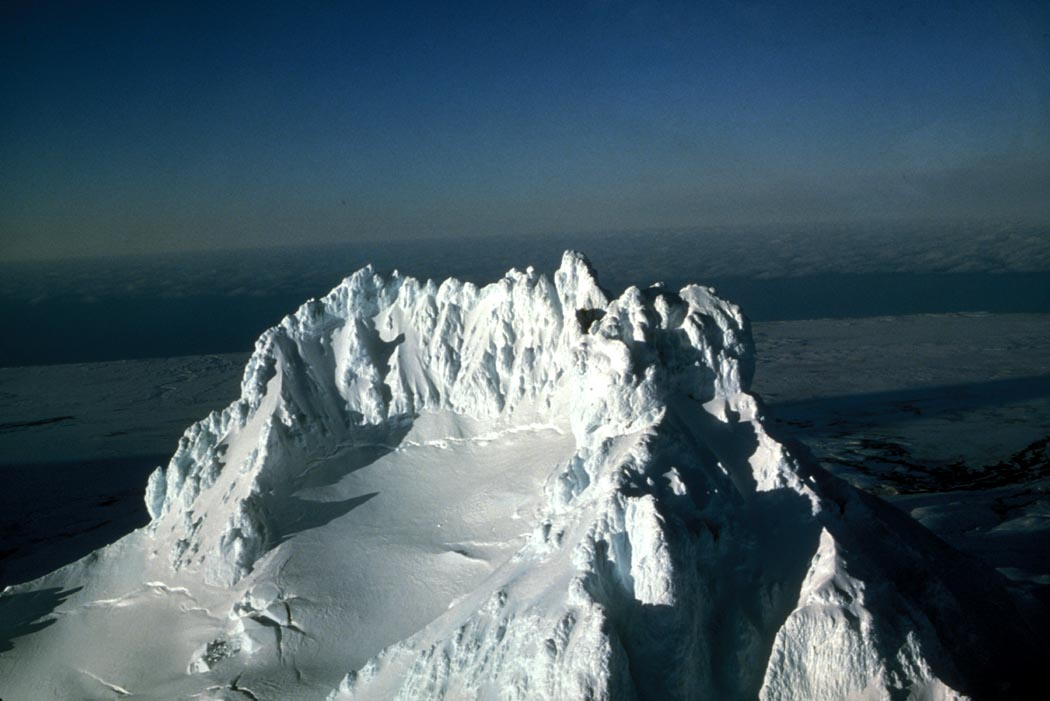
- Peak of Isanotski Peaks

Highest point
- Elevation: 8,106 ft (2,471 m)
- Prominence: 5,831 ft (1,777 m)
- Listing: US most prominent peaks 73rd
- Coordinates: 54°46′07″N 163°43′46″W

Geography
- Location within Alaska
- Location: Unimak Island, Alaska, U.S.
- Parent range: Aleutian Range

Geology
- Formed by: Subduction zone volcanism
- Mountain type: Stratovolcano
- Volcanic arc: Aleutian Arc
- Last eruption: Unknown

Isanotski Peaks or Isanotski Volcano, known locally as "Ragged Jack", is a multipeaked mountain on Unimak Island, the easternmost Aleutian Island in Alaska, United States. It is an old, highly dissected stratovolcano, lying about 10 miles (16 km) east of Shishaldin Volcano, the highest peak in the Aleutian Islands. Its height is also often given as 8,025 feet (2446 m).

In contrast to many of the younger, symmetrical volcanoes of the region, Isanotski is topped by multiple rugged pinnacles. This makes climbing or skiing the peak much more challenging than Shishaldin, for example.

While eruptions from 1825 and the 1840s have been attributed to Isanotski, geologists were only able to find evidence of Holocene eruptions on Shishaldin, not on Isanotski. Because of this, the actual date of Isanotski's last eruption is unknown.

== Gallery ==
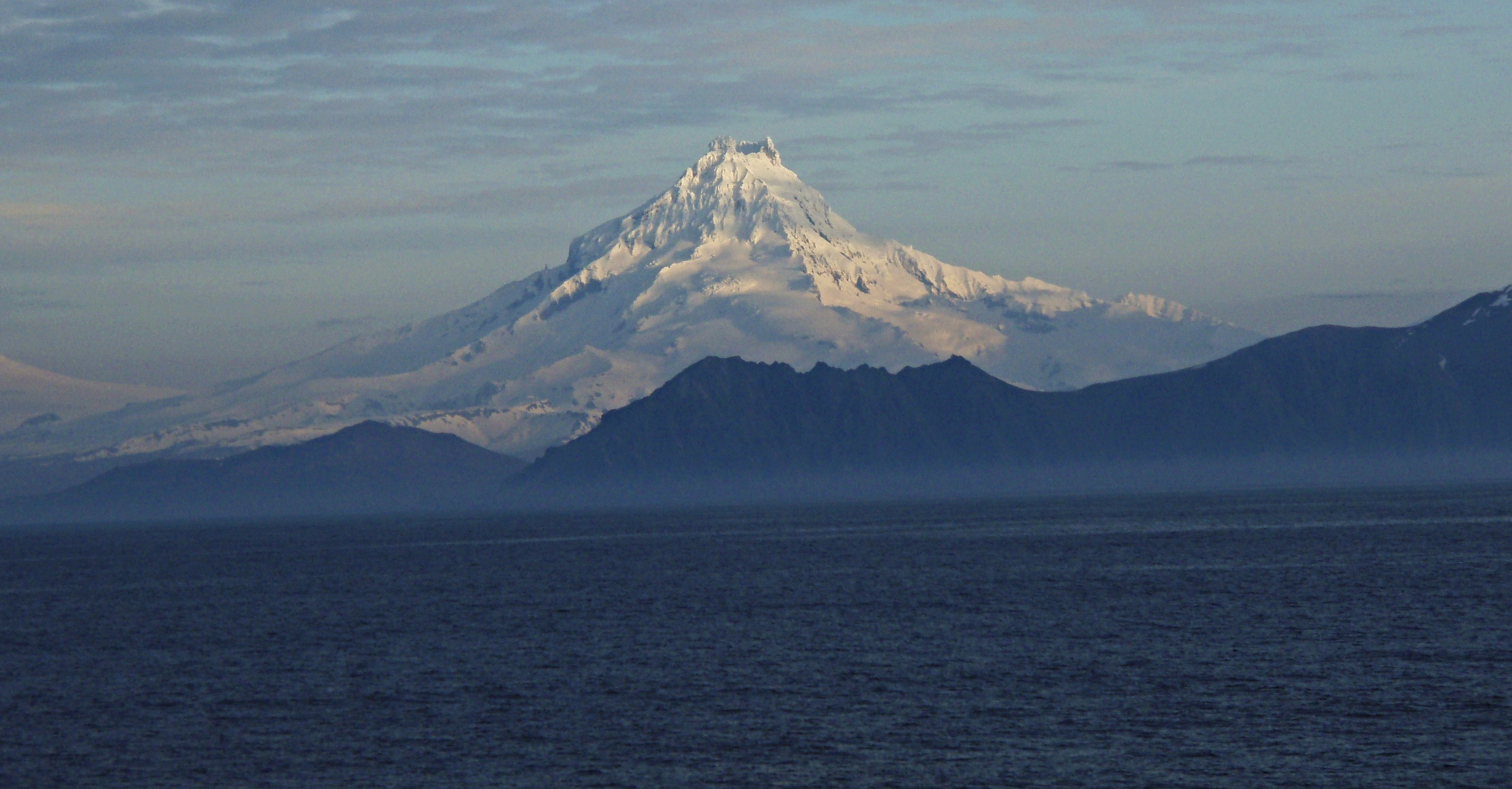
Isanotski Volcano

== See also ==
- List of mountain peaks of North America
  - List of mountain peaks of the United States
    - List of mountain peaks of Alaska
- List of Ultras of the United States
- List of volcanoes in the United States
