= Farallón de Pájaros =

Uninhabited volcanic island in the Northern Marianas island chain

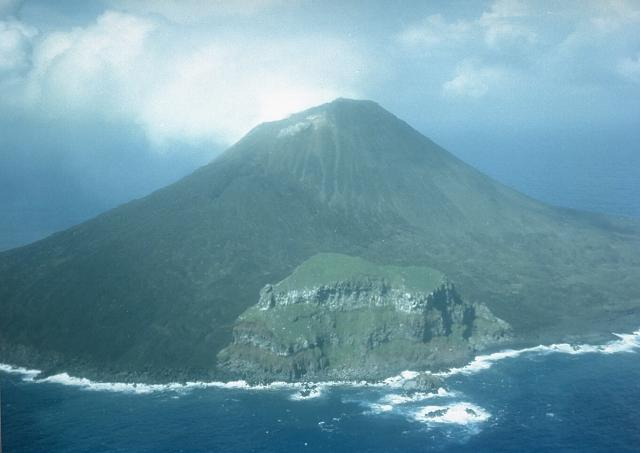
- view of Farallón de Pájaros

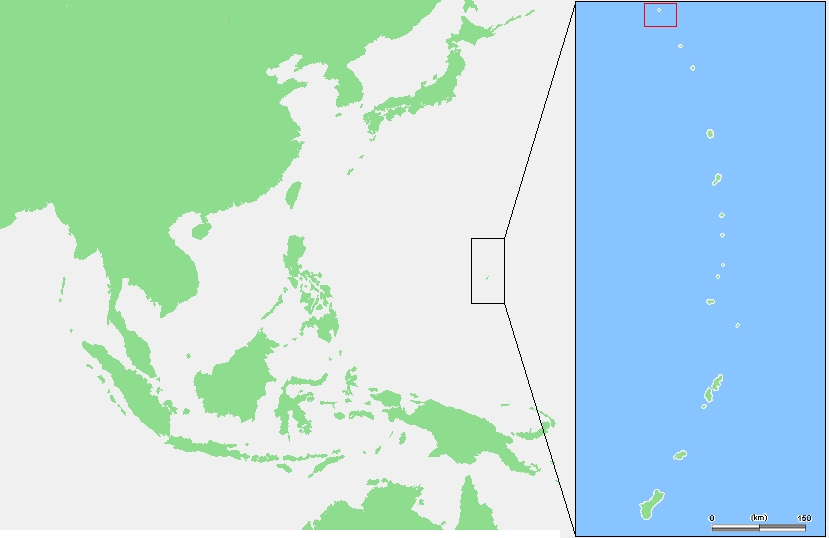

Geography
- Location: Pacific Ocean
- Coordinates: 20°32′42″N 144°53′37″E
- Archipelago: Mariana Islands
- Area: 2.2 km^{2} (0.85 sq mi)
- Length: 1.8 km (1.12 mi)
- Width: 1.6 km (0.99 mi)
- Highest elevation: 360 m (1180 ft)
- Highest point: Farallon de Pajaros

Administration
- United States
- Commonwealth: Northern Mariana Islands

Demographics
- Population: uninhabited - (2010)

Farallón de Pájaros (from Spanish Farallón de Pájaros, meaning "Birds' Sea Stack", see Stack (geology)), also known as Urracas (from Spanish Urracas, meaning "Magpies"), is a small (2.3 km^{2}) uninhabited volcanic island, the northernmost island and also farthest west in the Northern Mariana Islands chain.

== History ==
Presumably Farallón de Pájaros was never permanently inhabited.

Farallón de Pájaros was ceded by Spain to Germany through the German–Spanish Treaty (1899), together with the rest of the Mariana Islands (except Guam). The formalities of the cession were carried out on November 17, 1899, in Saipan, for all the Northern Mariana Islands.

From 1899 to 1914, Farallón de Pájaros was controlled by the German Empire and was administered as part of the colony of German New Guinea. In 1903 the island was leased to a Japanese company, which hunted birds whose feathers were exported to Japan and then to Paris.

After World War I, the island was awarded to the Empire of Japan, by the League of Nations as part of the South Seas Mandate. After World War II, Farallón de Pájaros was awarded to the United States as part of the UN Trust Territory of the Pacific Islands, and is currently administered as part of the Northern Islands Municipality of the Commonwealth of the Northern Mariana Islands.

In 1985, per the Constitution of the Commonwealth of the Northern Mariana Islands, the island was designated as a wilderness area for the protection and conservation of natural resources. Since 2009, the island has been part of Marianas Trench Marine National Monument of the United States.

== Geography ==
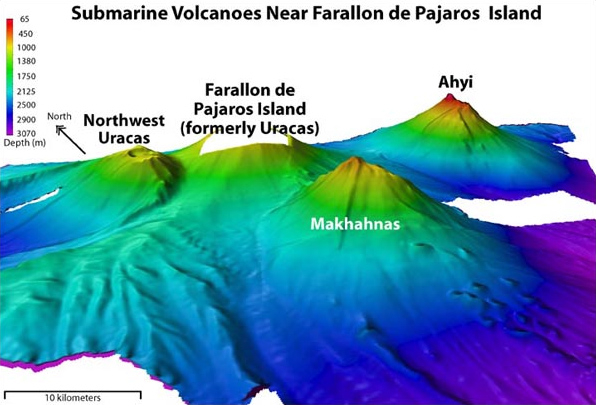
Bathymetry around Farallón de Pájaros

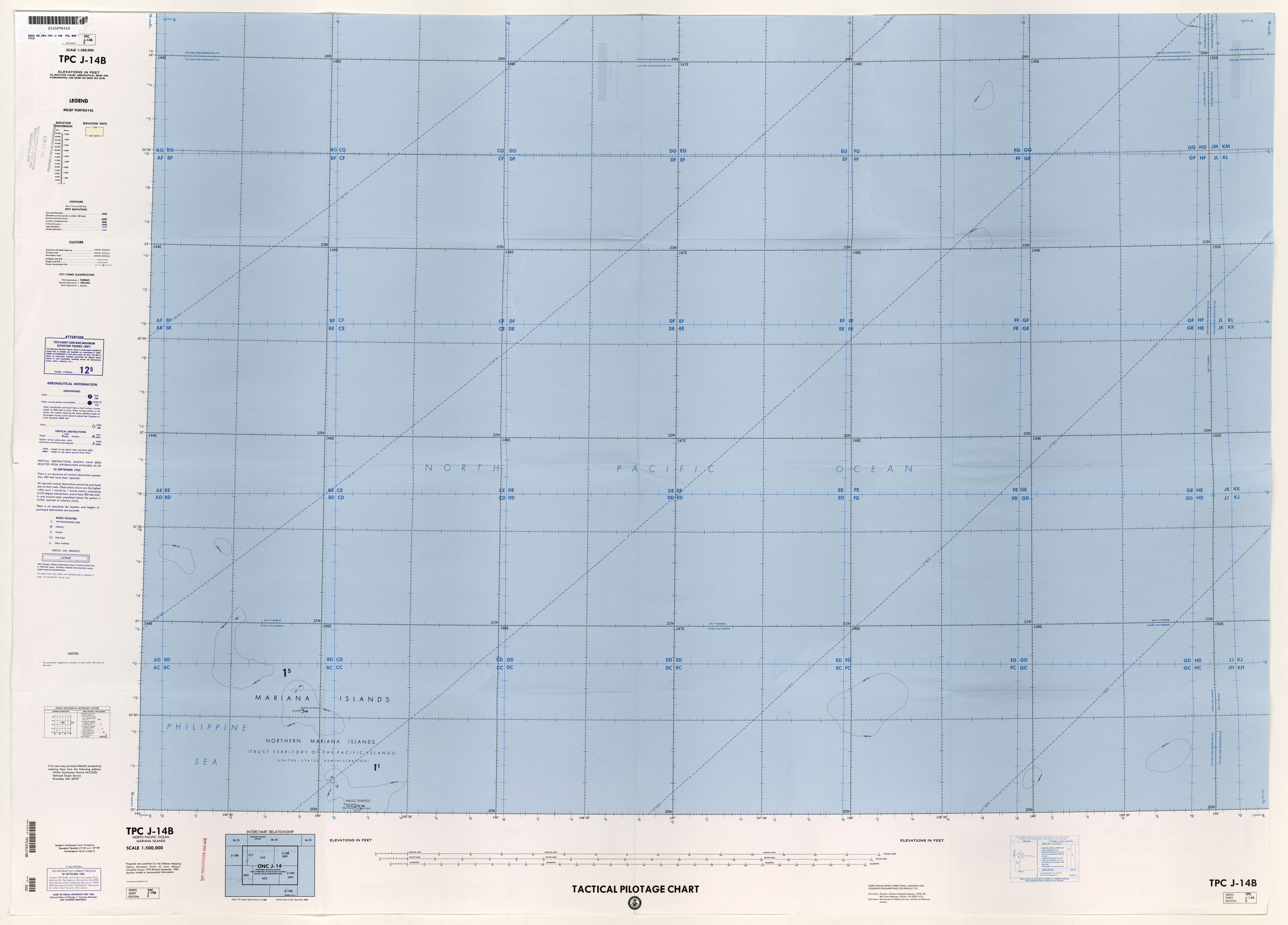
Map including Farallón de Pájaros (DMA, 1983)

Farallón de Pájaros is the northernmost island of the Marianas chain. It is located 65 kilometers (40 mi) northwest of the Maug Islands and 591 km (367 mi) north of Saipan, the main island of the Northern Mariana Islands. Its northern neighbor is South Iwo Jima of the Ogasawara Islands of Japan, located 541 km (336 mi) away.

Farallón de Pájaros is nearly circular, with a length of 1.8 km (1.1 mi), a width of 1.6 km (0.99 mi) and has an area of 2.3 km^{2} (0.89 sq mi). Farallón de Pájaros is the top of an active stratovolcano with a height of 360 meters (1,180 ft) above sea level. The base of this stratovolcano is about 2,000 feet (610 m) below sea level, it has a diameter of 15 to 20 kilometers.

=== Volcanic activity ===
Between 1864 and 1953, 15 volcanic eruptions of Farallón de Pájaros have been recorded.

In the area of Farallón de Pájaros are two submarine volcanoes: The Makhahnas Seamount located about 10 km (6.2 mi) southwest, reaching a height of 640 m (2,100 ft) below sea level, and last erupted in 1967. The Ahyi Seamount located about 18 km (11 mi) south-east and reaches a height of 79 m (259 ft) below sea level. It is associated with a possible eruption in 1979, an eruption in 2001, and a series of underwater eruptions from 24 April to 17 May 2014, with hydrothermal activity continuing at least to December 2014.

=== Important Bird Area ===
The island has been recognised as an Important Bird Area (IBA) by BirdLife International because it supports populations of Micronesian megapodes and sooty terns.

== See also ==
- Okinotorishima
