= Twin Buttes (California) =

Group of volcanic cinder cones in Shasta County, California, United States

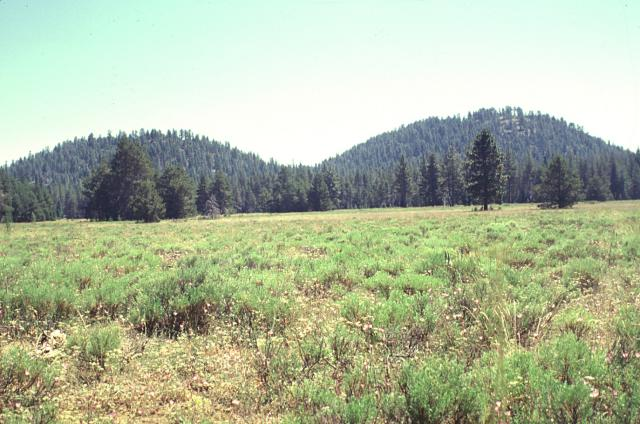
- Twin Buttes cinder cones

Highest point
- Elevation: 5,351 ft (1,631 m)
- Coordinates: 40°46′50″N 121°35′33″W

Geography
- Location: Shasta County, California, U.S.
- Parent range: Cascade Range
- Topo map: USGS Burney Mountain East

Geology
- Formed by: Subduction zone volcanism
- Rock age: Late Pleistocene
- Mountain type: Cinder cones
- Volcanic arc: Cascade Volcanic Arc

The Twin Buttes are two volcanic cinder cones located in the Cascade Range in Shasta County, California. They are part of the Bidwell Spring chain and lie within a region that was active in the Quaternary. Formed during the Pleistocene between 25,000 and 15,000 years ago, the volcanoes erupted lava flows that coursed toward the Burney Mountain lava dome. These lava flows cover an area of 3.9 square miles (10.1 km^{2}) and are made of basalt and dacite. The volcanoes also erupted cinder and volcanic ash that reached eastward.

As of 2012, the Twin Buttes were still monitored by the United States Geological Survey for deformation, an indicator of pre-eruptive activity. However, they are considered to have "low to very low" threat potential for future eruptive activity.

== Geography ==
The Twin Buttes are two cinder cone volcanoes that lie north of Lassen Peak in Shasta County, California. The Twin Buttes reach a summit elevation of about 5,351 feet (1,631 m).^{[a]} Nearby towns include Burney, Old Station, and Viola. About 6,700 people live within 19 miles (30 km) of the volcanoes, though the population within 62 miles (100 km) climbs to more than 260,000. The buttes are aligned north–northwest and lie at the center of the Bidwell Spring volcanic chain.

== Geology ==
The Twin Buttes — and other volcanoes near Lassen Peak — are part of the Cascade Volcanic Arc, which was produced by subduction of the oceanic Juan de Fuca tectonic plate under the North American tectonic plate. Volcanic activity in the region is also influenced by the westward expansion of the Basin and Range Province into the Cascades. Volcanism in the region encompasses a wide variety of eruption types, ranging from cinder cones to shield volcanoes. Eruptive activity has for the most part produced overlapping, mafic volcanoes through nonexplosive to weak explosive eruptions. Volcanic activity during the Quaternary has produced basalt, basaltic andesite, and olivine tholeiite. Other major volcanic centers near the Twin Buttes include the Yana, Maidu, Dittmar, and Latour centers, which were long-lived volcanic systems with magma ranging in composition from andesite to silicic rhyolite; these four systems are now eroded with extinct hydrothermal systems.

The Bidwell Spring chain consists of five eruptive units, including the Twin Buttes basalt. ^{40}Ar/^{39}Ar has placed two other deposits, basaltic andesite from Black Butte and andesite from Bidwell Spring, at 62,000 ± 10,000 years old and 68,000 ± 6,000 years old, respectively. These results suggest several small eruptions between 65,000 and 45,000 years ago from the Bidwell Spring chain. Two other basaltic andesite deposits from the chain have been described by the United States Geological Survey (USGS), which considers the Bidwell Spring chain as part of the Caribou Volcanic Field, a system of 11 eruptive sequences between 200,000 and 100,000 years ago with vents aligned with faults that focused surface volcanic activity. Basalt from the Twin Buttes overlies eruptive material from the Poison Lake Chain and the Cone Lake Chain, which are also within the Caribou Volcanic field. Twin Buttes basalt is overlain by basaltic andesite erupted during the late Pleistocene from an unnamed volcanic vent, which is thought to be between 45,000 and 25,000 years old.

=== Subfeatures ===
Subfeatures of the formation include Red Rock Hill, which has an elevation of 5,240 feet (1,597 m). Other nearby features include basaltic andesite and a distinct basalt deposit southeast and northeast of the Twin Buttes, respectively, both of which were produced by eruptive activity between 50,000 and 35,000 years ago.

== Eruptive history ==
Located in an area that was highly active during the Quaternary, the Twin Buttes volcanoes formed during the late Pleistocene.^{[b]} The North and South Twin Buttes erupted blocky, partially unvegetated lava flows that moved north toward the southeastern base of Burney Mountain, a lava dome, between 25,000 and 15,000 years ago, covering an area of 3.9 square miles (10.1 km^{2}). They have an overall volume of 1.23 cubic kilometres (0.296 cu mi). Eruptive material consisted of basalt (including picrite basalt) and dacite. Basalt erupted from Twin Buttes forms part of the Bidwell Spring chain with an ^{40}Ar/^{39}Ar age of about 46,000 ± 3,000 years, covering an area of 7.6 square miles (19.8 km^{2}). The basalt deposit has a total volume of 0.19 cubic miles (0.8 km^{3}). At the edges, lava flows are steep, with up to 33 feet (10 m) of relief. The lava flows from the Twin Buttes are porphyritic with about 53% silica content; they have vesicular surfaces and dense interiors. Phenocrysts range from 0.020 to 0.039 inches (0.5 to 1 mm); there are also coarse xenoliths of quartz throughout the lava flows. Cinder and volcanic ash erupted by the Twin Buttes extend to the east.

While Twin Buttes last erupted during the late Pleistocene, the area is still monitored by the USGS given its proximity to Lassen Peak. As of 2012, there were three GPS receivers continuously monitoring Twin Buttes for deformation, an indicator of pre-eruptive activity. In 2014, the USGS considered Twin Buttes to have "low to very low" threat potential for a future eruption.

== See also ==
- List of volcanoes in the United States

== Notes ==
- [a] The Global Volcanism Program of the Smithsonian Institution lists the Twin Buttes summit elevation as 5,351 feet (1,631 m). However, the Geographic Names Information System lists its elevation as 5,341 feet (1,628 m).
- [b] The Global Volcanism Program lists Twin Buttes as a Pleistocene volcano. Archived materials published by the United States Geological Survey lists it as late Pleistocene or early Holocene.

== Sources ==
- Clynne, M.A.; Muffler, L.J.P. (December 30, 2010). Geologic Map of Lassen Volcanic National Park and Vicinity, California (PDF) (Map). United States Geological Survey. Scientific Investigations Map 2899.
- Clynne, M.A.; Robinson, J.E.; Nathenson, M.; Muffler, L.J.P. (2012). Volcano hazards assessment for the Lassen region, northern California: U.S. Geological Survey Scientific Investigations Report 2012–5176–A (PDF) (Report). United States Geological Survey.
- Germa, A.; Perry, C.; Quidelleur, X.; Calvert, A.; Clynne, M.; Connor, C.B.; Connor, L.J.; Malservisi, R.; Charbonnier, S. (June 7, 2019). "Temporal relationship between the Lassen volcanic center and mafic regional volcanism". Bulletin of Volcanology. 81 (38). Springer Science+Business Media: 38. Bibcode:2019BVol...81...38G. doi:10.1007/s00445-019-1296-7. S2CID 195240340.
- Muffler, L.J.P.; Clynne, M.A.; Calvert, A.T.; Champion, D.E. (November 1, 2011). "Diverse, discrete, mantle-derived batches of basalt erupted along a short normal fault zone: The Poison Lake chain, southernmost Cascades". Geological Society of America Bulletin. 123 (11–12). Geological Society of America: 2177–2200. Bibcode:2011GSAB..123.2177M. doi:10.1130/B30370.1.
