= Split Butte =

Volcanic crater in Idaho, United States

Highest point
- Elevation: 6,227 ft (1,898 m)
- Coordinates: 44.25°N 111.73°W

Geography
- Location: Butte County, Idaho, United States
- Topo map: USGS Split Butte

Geology
- Rock age: 300,000 years
- Mountain type: Lava dome

Split Butte is a volcanic crater of the Quaternary age located in Fremont county in Idaho.

The National Park Service called Split Butte one of the most unique features of the Snake River Plain.

== Name ==
The name of the crater comes from gap in the upper tephra layers at the eastern side of the butte.

== Geology ==
Split Butte is also a maars and a tuff cone. At one point it had a lava lake.

The split, which is located on the east side is believed to be caused by wind erosion. The winds have also caused more pyroclastic debris to the east side.

It is slightly surrounded by lava flows from the Wapi lava field the butte contains vitric ash that forms a ring.
