= Buzzard Creek (Alaska) =

Highest point
- Elevation: 2,723 ft (830 m)

Geography
- Location: Alaska, United States

Geology
- Mountain type: Tuff cones
- Last eruption: 1050 BC

The Buzzard Creek craters are two tuff rings near Healy, Alaska, United States. Its highest point is 2,723 ft (830 m).

Its last eruption occurred in 1050 BC.

It is the smallest volcano in the world, followed by Dotsero
