= Agrigan =

Small island off the southern coast of the island of Guam

Coordinates: 13.2477°N 144.7172°E

Agrigan is a small island off the southern coast of the island of Guam. It is connected to the mainland by the Merizo Barrier Reef.
