= Ruby Seamount =

Seamount chain east of Australia that includes Lord Howe Island

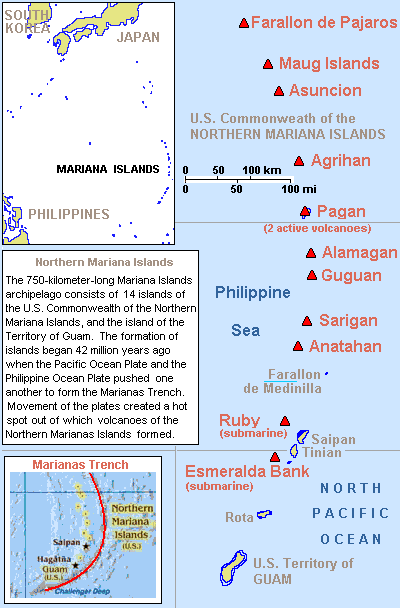
- Major volcanoes of the Mariana Islands

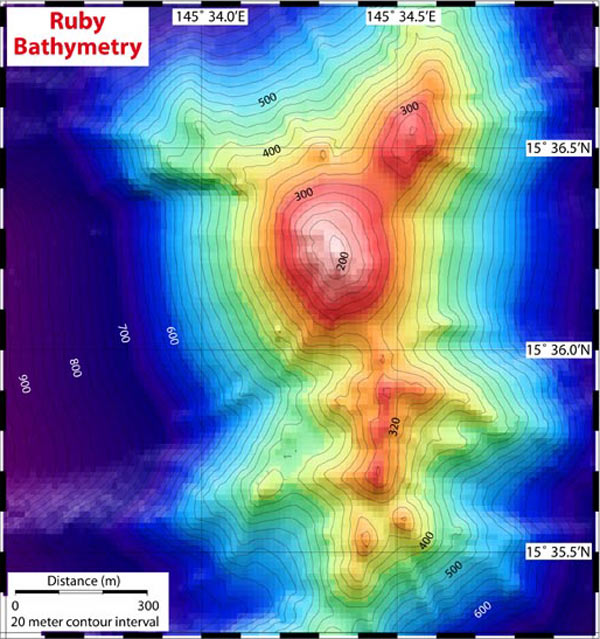
- Ruby Seamount bathymetry
- Ruby Seamount bathymetry
- Summit depth: 175 m (574 ft)

Location
- Location: Pacific Ocean
- Group: Izu–Bonin–Mariana Arc
- Coordinates: 15°37′12″N 145°34′12″E
- Country: Commonwealth of Northern Mariana Islands, United States

Geology
- Type: Seamount
- Age of rock: 2–0 Ma
- Last eruption: 15 September 2023

Ruby Seamount is an active volcanic seamount in the Northern Mariana Islands region of the Pacific Ocean about 50 km (31 mi) north-west of Saipan. It is in a region where the Pacific Plate is subducting under the Philippine Sea Plate producing arc volcanism.

== Eruptions ==
A submarine eruption occurred during a period of about 12 hours between 14 and 15 September 2023, and it also erupted in 1966 and between 11 and 23 October 1995.

== Geology ==
Ruby Seamount is a stratovolcano with a more shallow southern peak, and is part of the nine volcano Southern Seamount Province of the Mariana Arc, in the Izu–Bonin–Mariana Arc. Its location is consistent with it being a back-arc extension associated volcano. Samples of lava have been characterised as arc tholeiitic basalts, suggestive that the magma source was from mantle overlying, not beneath, the subducting Pacific Plate. The age of the volcano is unknown but nearby basalts have been dated at about 2 million years old, so it likely started forming more recently than this.

Hydrothermal activity was demonstrated in 2006 with alkaline, ferrous ion and carbon dioxide venting at 200 m (660 ft) depth. The ratio of CO_{2} / ^{3}He flux observed at Ruby is amongst the highest ever reported, which is consistent with volcanism involving a deep magma source from slab derived carbonate containing rocks.

=== Depth revision ===
Prior to the 1995 eruption the depth was accepted as 230 m (750 ft), but several reports of shallower depths followed the eruption including one of only about 60 m (200 ft) exist. A high quality survey in 2003 gave a depth of 180 m (590 ft) with the peak of North Ruby having a depth of 726 m (2,382 ft). The next high quality survey in 2006 gave a new depth of 175 m (574 ft).

== Ecology ==
A unique ecosystem of crabs and limpets has been described on the flanks of the volcano.

== Name ==
It was first named as Ruby Volcano in the 1973 paper that described some of the 1966 eruption evidence.
