= Supply Reef =

Submerged circular reef of volcanic origin in the Northern Mariana Islands

- Location within Northern Mariana Islands Location within North Pacific
- Summit depth: −8 m (−26 ft)

Location
- Location: Northern Mariana Islands
- Coordinates: 20°08′N 145°6′E
- Country: United States

Geology
- Type: Submarine volcano
- Last eruption: September to December 1989

Supply Reef is a submerged circular reef of volcanic origin in the Northern Mariana Islands chain, about 10 kilometres (6 mi) NW of the Maug Islands. Presently, this igneous seamount is roughly 8 metres (26 ft) below the ocean's surface and about 100 m (300 ft) in diameter. Apparent episodes of submarine volcanism were noted on December 22–24 and 26–27 in 1989.

Volcanic and seismic activity has been noted, as well as hard and soft corals.

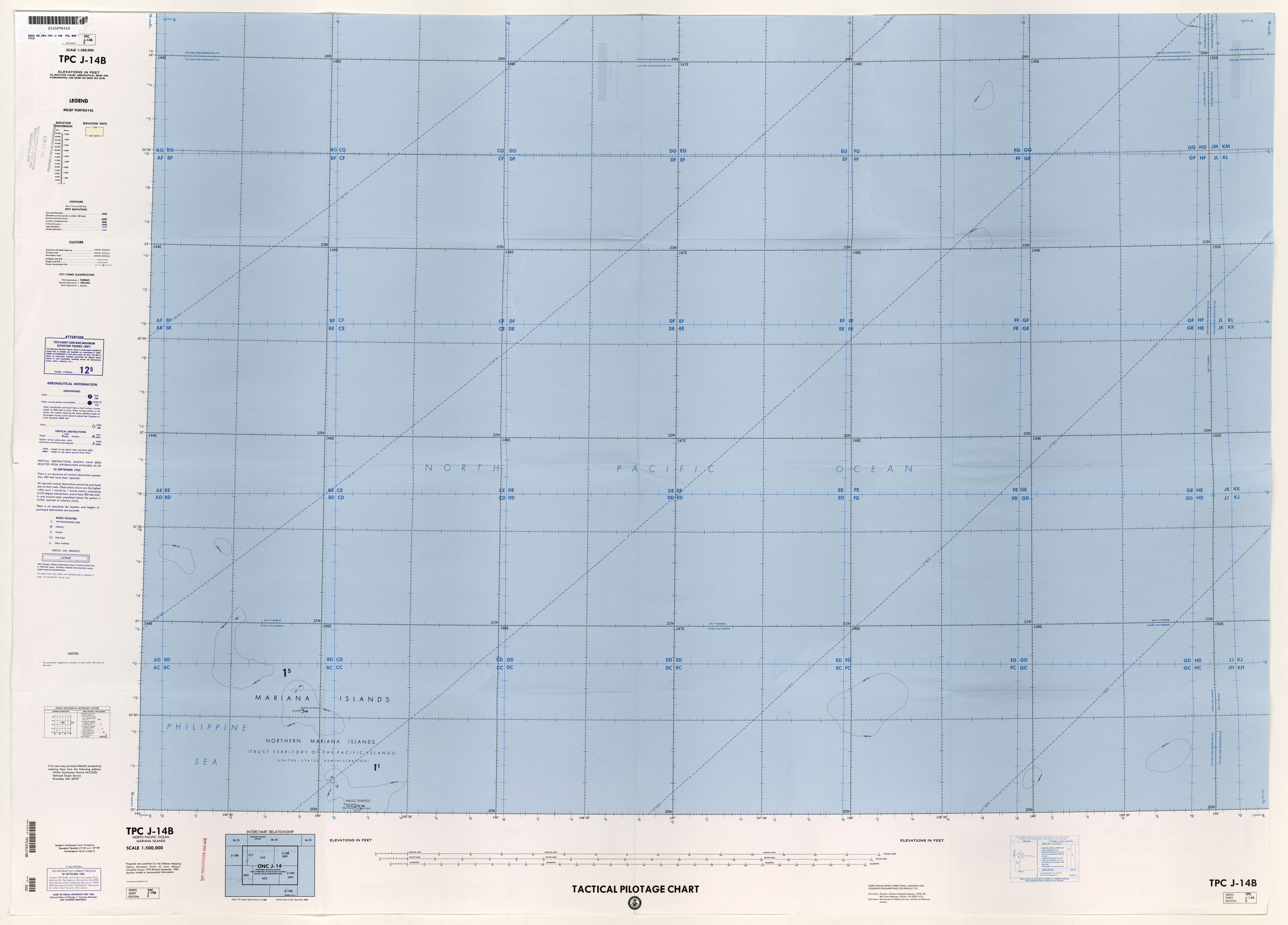
Map including Supply Reef (labeled as 'reef') (DMA, 1983)
