= Egegik (disambiguation) =

Egegik (Igyagiiq in Yup'ik) may also refer to:

- Egegik, Alaska, a city in Lake and Peninsula Borough, Alaska.
- Egegik Airport, a city owned, public use airport serving Egegik city.
- Egegik Bay, a bay in Bristol Bay, Alaska
- Egegik River, a river in Alaska.
- Egegik Yupik, one of the five Central Alaskan Yup'ik dialects
