= List of volcanic craters in Alaska =

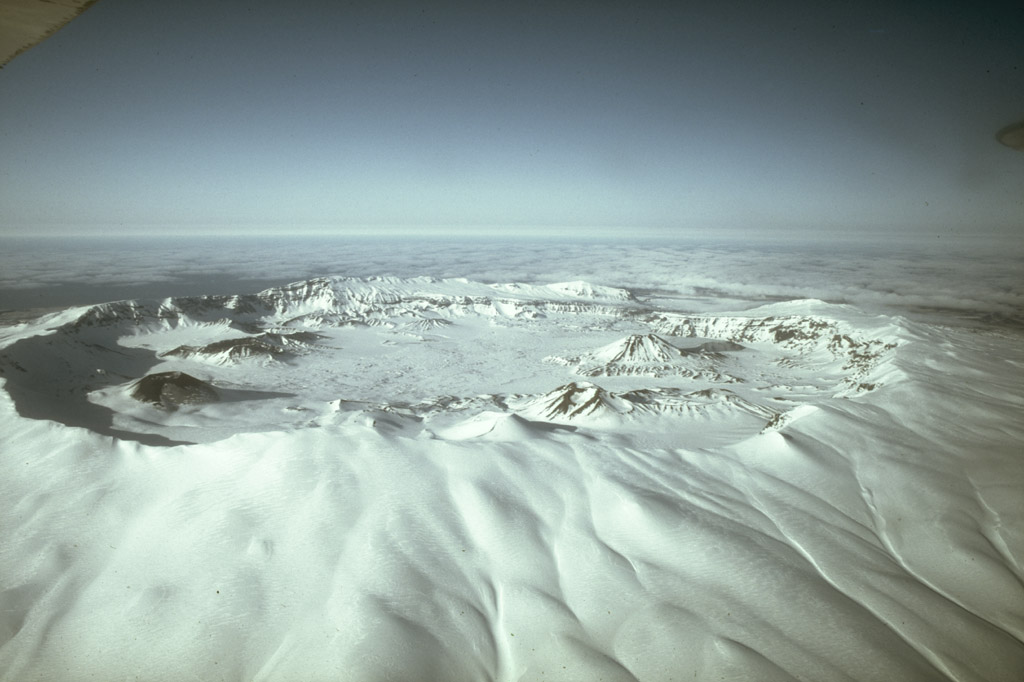
Okmok Caldera

The United States National Geodetic Survey lists thirteen craters in the state of Alaska.

== Aleutians East Borough ==
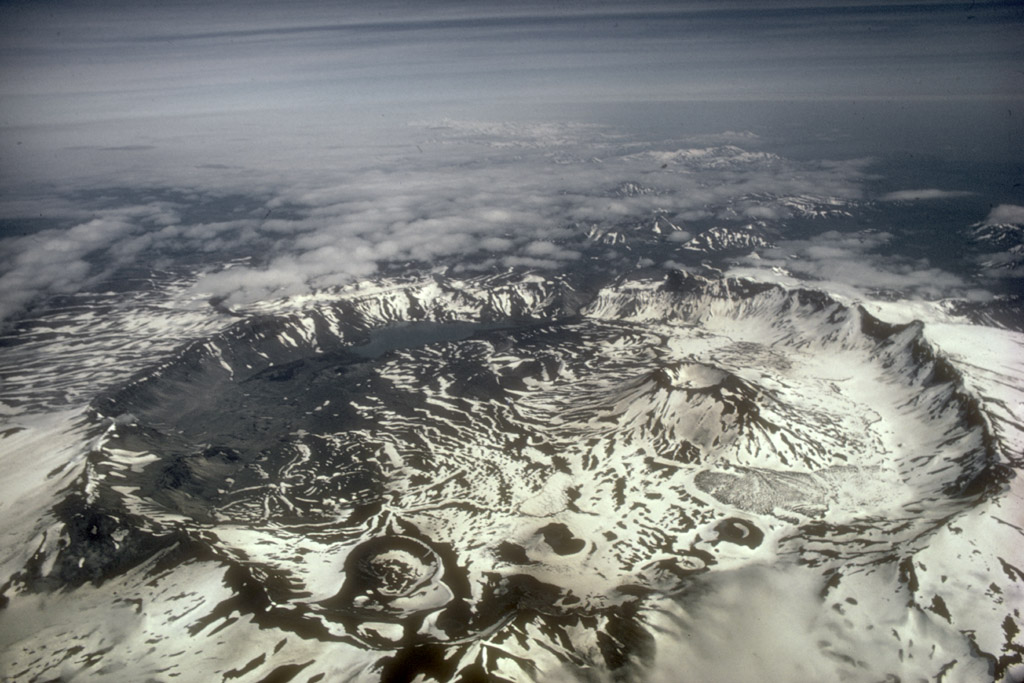
Mount Aniakchak caldera

- Fisher Caldera is located on Unimak Island and named for American geologist Bernard Fisher, who died on June 22, 1946, while exploring the Umnak Pass. It is 8 miles (13 km) by 6 miles (10 km) in area.

== Aleutians West Census Area ==
- Okmok Caldera

== Bethel Census Area ==
- Binalik Crater is located on Nunivak Island. It was named by the Yupik people, and reported in 1937. It is 0.3 miles (0.5 km) across.
- Ikathiwik Crater
- Nanwaksjiak Crater

== Kodiak Island ==
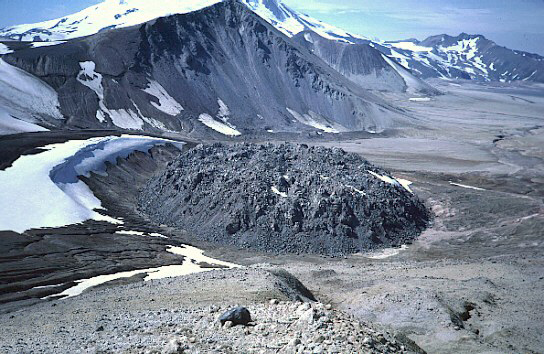
Novarupta, July 1987

- Kaguyak Crater

== Lake and Peninsula Borough ==
- Aniakchak Crater
- Novarupta
- Ukinrek maars

== Nome Census Area ==
- Twin Calderas

== Valdez-Cordova Census Area ==
- East Crater
- Mount Wrangell
- North Crater

== See also ==
- Avak crater - confirmed impact crater near Barrow
