= Mount Becharof =

Mountain in Alaska, United States

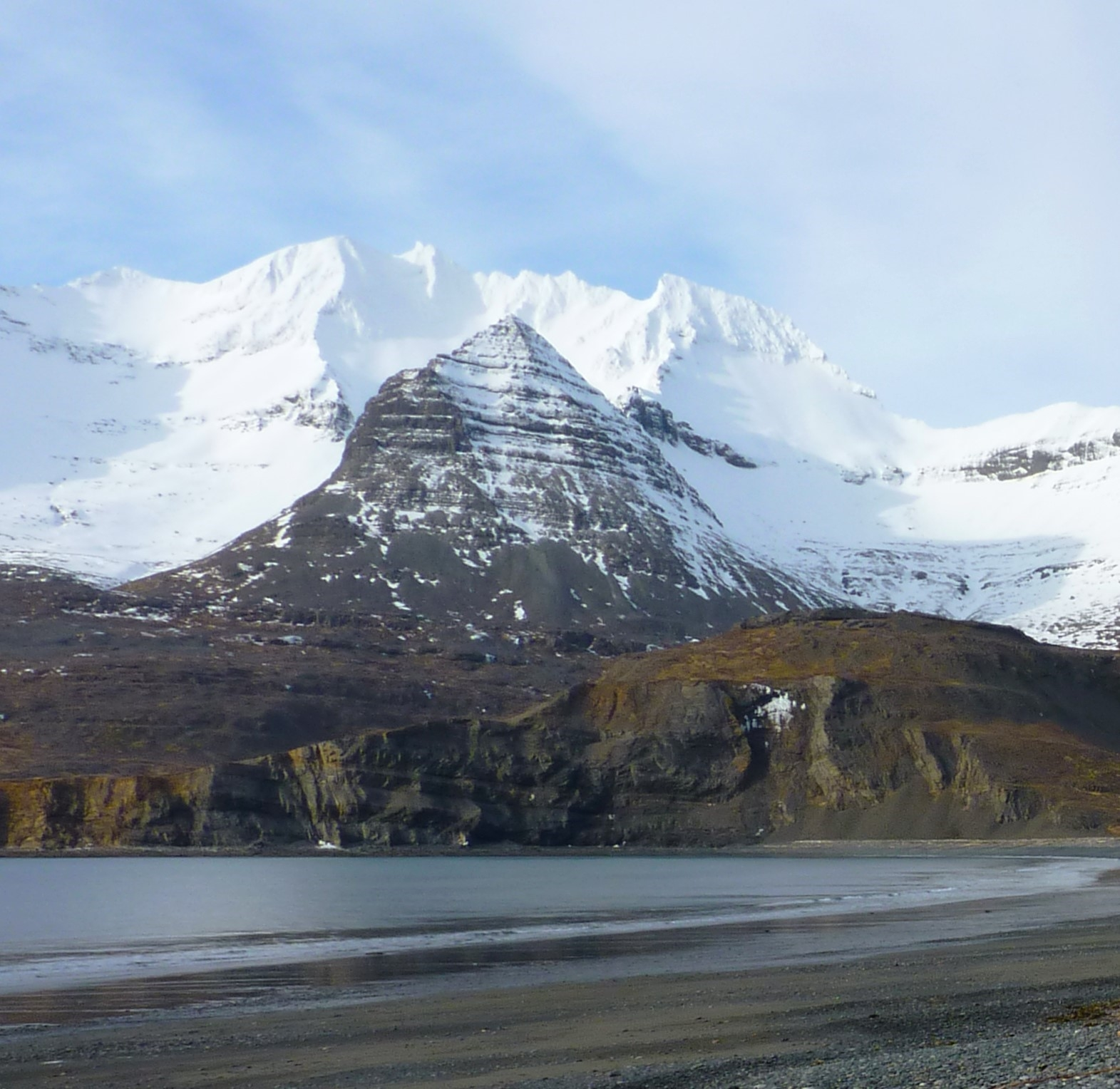
- Northeast aspect

Highest point
- Elevation: 3,146 ft (959 m)
- Prominence: 2,575 ft (785 m)
- Parent peak: Deer Mountain (3,350 ft)
- Isolation: 17.88 mi (28.78 km)
- Coordinates: 57°32′38″N 156°04′44″W

Geography
- Location within Alaska
- Interactive map of Mount Becharof
- Country: United States
- State: Alaska
- Borough: Kodiak Island Borough
- Protected area: Becharof National Wildlife Refuge
- Parent range: Aleutian Range
- Topo map: USGS Ugashik C-1

Mount Becharof is a 3,146-foot-elevation (959-meter) mountain summit in Alaska.

== Description ==
Part of the Aleutian Range, Mount Becharof is located 135 miles (217 km) west of Kodiak on the southeastern coast of the Alaska Peninsula. It is set on the west shore of Portage Bay and north shore of Kanatak Lagoon, within the Becharof National Wildlife Refuge. Precipitation runoff from the mountain drains into Kanatak Creek, Portage Bay, and Kanatak Lagoon. Topographic relief is significant as the summit rises over 3,000 feet (914 meters) above tidewater at Kanatak Lagoon in 1.2 miles (1.9 km). The mountain's name was published in the 1880s by the United States Coast and Geodetic Survey and the toponym has been officially adopted by the United States Board on Geographic Names. The mountain is named in association with nearby Becharof Lake which was named in 1868 by William Healey Dall after the Russian navigator Dmitry Bocharov of the Imperial Russian Navy who explored Kodiak in 1788.

== Climate ==
According to the Köppen climate classification system, Mount Becharof is located in a subpolar oceanic climate zone with cold, snowy winters, and cool summers. Weather systems coming off the North Pacific are forced upwards by the mountains (orographic lift), causing heavy precipitation in the form of rainfall and snowfall. Winter temperatures can drop to 0 °F with wind chill factors below −10 °F.

== Gallery ==
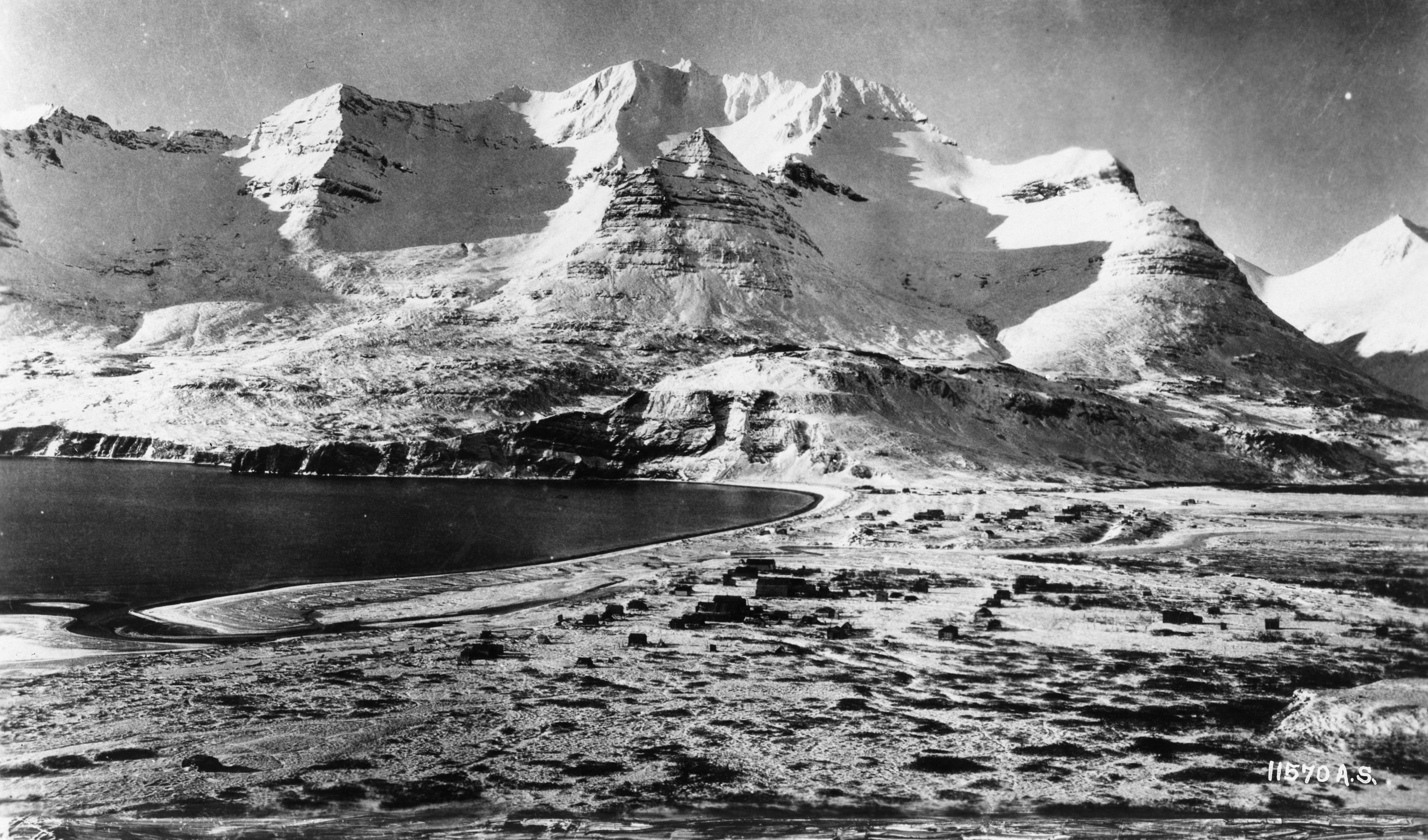
Mount Becharof in 1940s

== See also ==
- List of mountain peaks of Alaska
- Geography of Alaska
