= Ukinrek maars =

Two volcanic craters in Alaska, U.S.

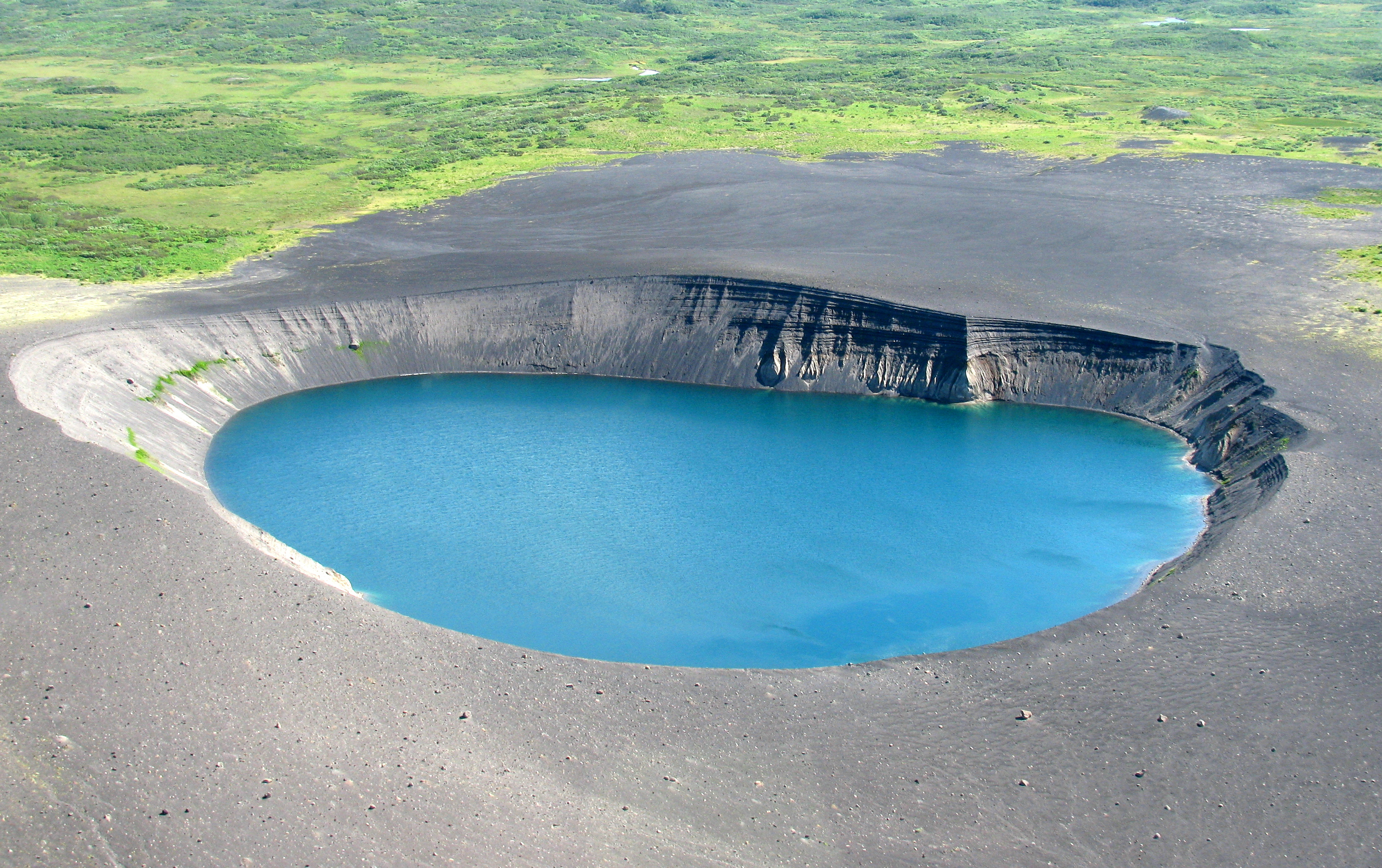
- Aerial view of the Ukinrek maars in 2011

Highest point
- Elevation: 299 ft (91 m)
- Coordinates: 57°49′54″N 156°30′35″W

Geography
- Location: Becharof National Wildlife Refuge, Alaska, on Alaska Peninsula
- Parent range: Aleutian Range

Geology
- Mountain type: Maars
- Last eruption: March–April 1977

The Ukinrek maars (Central Yupik: Ukinrek) are two volcanic craters on the north side of the Aleutian Range in Alaska that were formed by a phreatomagmatic eruption in 1977. The maars are 1.5 km south of Becharof Lake and 12 km northwest of Peulik Volcano, on a low area of the range, bordering the Bering Sea. The western of the two is elliptical in shape and up to 170 m in diameter and 35 m deep. The other lies 600 m to the east and is circular and up to 300 m in diameter and 70 m deep. The east maar has a 49 m-high lava dome within its crater lake.

The eruption occurred in March–April 1977 and lasted for ten days. There was no previous eruption. The magmatic material was olivine basalt from a mantle source. Pyroclastic surge from the eruptions traveled to the northwest. The volume of lava erupted was 9×10^{5} m^{3} and the volume of tephra expelled was 2.6×10^{7} m^{3}. They were named shortly after the eruptions and the literal translation means "Two Holes".

The Quaternary age Gas Rocks dacite domes some three km to the northeast were the site of a phreatic eruption some 2300 years ago.

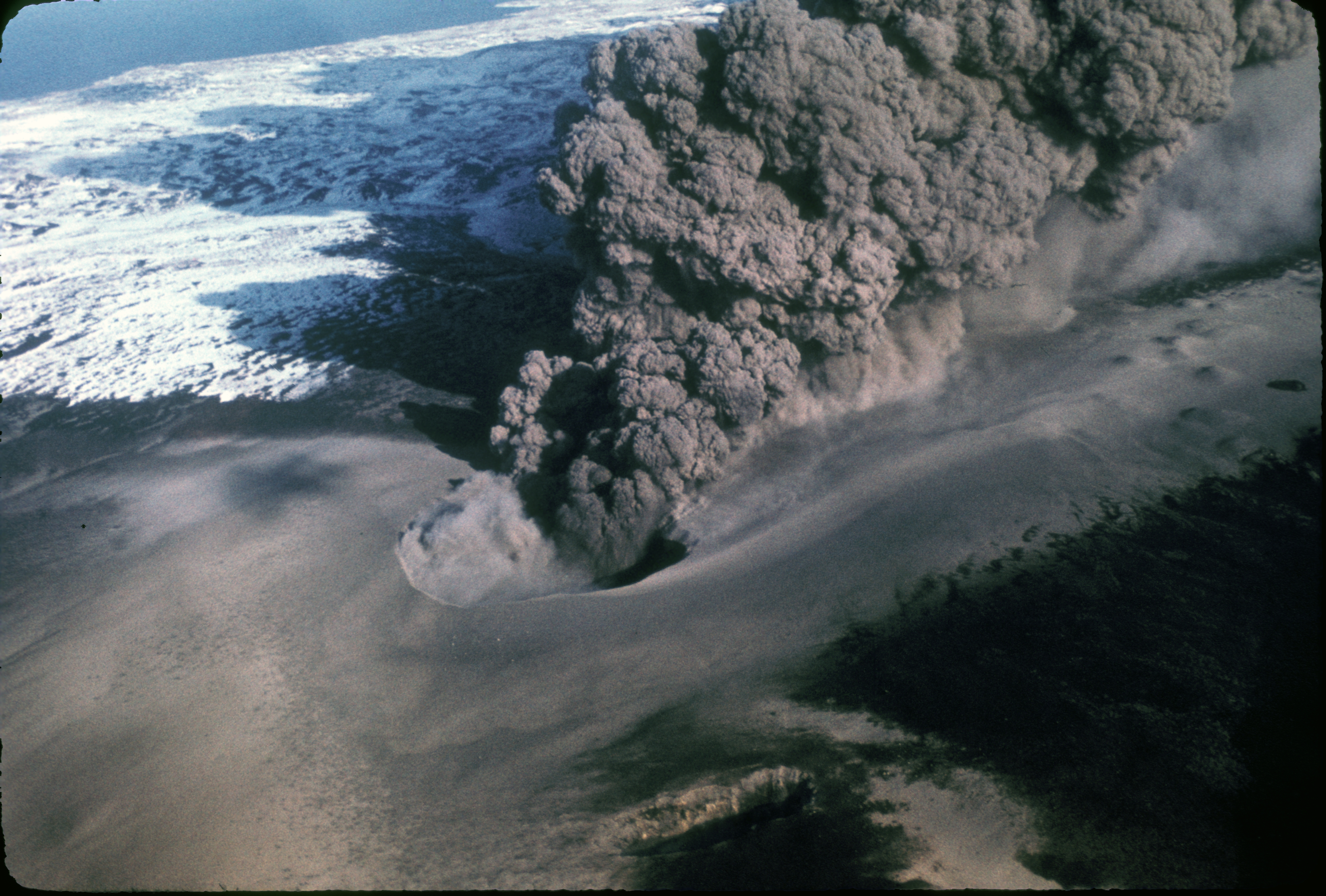
Ukinrek eruption in April 1977

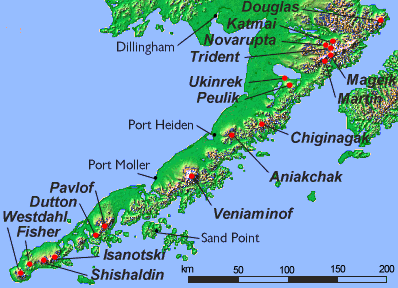
Map showing volcanoes of Alaska
