= List of largest lakes of the United States by volume =

This article lists the largest lakes, natural and man-made, in the United States by volume—the amount of water they contain under normal conditions. Volumes given for lakes shared with Canada and Mexico are for the total volume of the lake. Many lakes vary substantially in volume over time, especially man-made lakes, reservoirs, and lakes in arid areas. Capacity given is for normal or average lake level.

	Name	Location	Volume	Maximum Depth	notes
1	Lake Superior	Michigan - Minnesota - Ontario - Wisconsin	9,799,680,000 acre⋅ft (12,088 km^{3})	1,332 ft (406 m)	Third-largest fresh-water lake in the world by volume
2	Lake Michigan	Illinois - Indiana - Michigan - Wisconsin	3,987,455,942 acre⋅ft (4,918 km^{3})	925 ft (282 m)	L. Huron and. L. Michigan may be considered a single lake
3	Lake Huron	Michigan - Ontario	2,872,320,000 acre⋅ft (3,543 km^{3})	750 ft (229 m)	
4	Lake Ontario	New York - Ontario	1,328,025,000 acre⋅ft (1,638 km^{3})	802 ft (244 m)	
5	Lake Erie	Michigan - New York - Ohio - Ontario - Pennsylvania	392,000,000 acre⋅ft (484 km^{3})	210 ft (64 m)	
6	Lake Tahoe	California - Nevada	122,160,280 acre⋅ft (150.7 km^{3})	1,645 ft (501 m)	
7	Iliamna Lake	Alaska	94,111,488 acre⋅ft (116.1 km^{3})	988 ft (301 m)	
8	Lake Pend Oreille	Idaho	43,939,940 acre⋅ft (54.2 km^{3})	1,152 ft (351 m)	
9	Becharof Lake	Alaska	35,671,173 acre⋅ft (44.0 km^{3})	302 ft (92 m)	
10	Lake Clark	Alaska	25,682,000 acre⋅ft (31.7 km^{3})	1,056 ft (322 m)	
11	Lake Sakakawea	North Dakota	24,200,000 acre⋅ft (29.9 km^{3})	180 ft (55 m)	man-made
12	Pyramid Lake	Nevada	23,660,000 acre⋅ft (29.2 km^{3})	344 ft (105 m)	
13	Lake Oahe	North Dakota - South Dakota	23,625,315 acre⋅ft (29.1 km^{3})	205 ft (62 m)	man-made
14	Lake Champlain	Vermont - New York - Quebec	20,916,400 acre⋅ft (25.8 km^{3})	400 ft (122 m)	
15	Lake Mead	Arizona - Nevada	19,200,000 acre⋅ft (23.7 km^{3})	532 ft (162 m)	man-made
16	Flathead Lake	Montana	18,788,243 acre⋅ft (23.2 km^{3})	371 ft (113 m)	Remnant of Glacial Lake Missoula
17	Fort Peck Lake	Montana	18,700,000 acre⋅ft (23.1 km^{3})	220 ft (67 m)	man-made
18	Lake Chelan	Washington	15,800,000 acre⋅ft (19.5 km^{3})	1,486 ft (453 m)	
19	Lake of the Woods	Ontario - Minnesota - Manitoba	15,700,000 acre⋅ft (19.4 km^{3})	210 ft (64 m)	
20	Lake Powell	Utah - Arizona	15,500,000 acre⋅ft (19.1 km^{3})	583 ft (178 m)	man-made
21	Great Salt Lake	Utah	15,000,000 acre⋅ft (19 km^{3})	33 ft (10 m)	salt, variable in area.
22	Crater Lake	Oregon	14,100,000 acre⋅ft (17.4 km^{3})	1,949 ft (594 m)	deepest lake in the United States
23	Seneca Lake	New York	12,566,054 acre⋅ft (15.5 km^{3})	618 ft (188 m)	largest of the Finger Lakes
24	Yellowstone Lake	Wyoming	12,095,264 acre⋅ft (14.9 km^{3})	390 ft (119 m)	highest in elevation of large lakes
25	Lake Franklin D. Roosevelt	Washington	9,402,000 acre⋅ft (11.6 km^{3})	349 ft (106 m)	man-made. Created in 1941 by the impoundment of the Columbia River by the Grand Coulee Dam
26	Cayuga Lake	New York	7,672,000 acre⋅ft (9.5 km^{3})	435 ft (133 m)	second largest of the Finger Lakes
27	Rainy Lake	Ontario - Minnesota	7,072,000 acre⋅ft (8.7 km^{3})	161 ft (49 m)	
28	Bear Lake	Idaho - Utah	6,557,440 acre⋅ft (8.1 km^{3})	208 ft (63 m)	
29	Salton Sea	California	6,000,000 acre⋅ft (7.4 km^{3})	43 ft (13 m)	salt, variable in area. Present volume man-made
30	Skilak Lake	Alaska	5,930,640 acre⋅ft (7.3 km^{3})	528 ft (161 m)	
31	Tustumena Lake	Alaska	5,801,523 acre⋅ft (7.2 km^{3})	950 ft (290 m)	
32	Lake Pontchartrain	Louisiana	4,838,400 acre⋅ft (6.0 km^{3})	65 ft (20 m)	salt, often considered an estuary rather than a lake
33	Lake Shasta	California	4,552,000 acre⋅ft (5.6 km^{3})	517 ft (158 m)	man-made
34	Toledo Bend Reservoir	Louisiana - Texas	4,477,000 acre⋅ft (5.5 km^{3})	110 ft (34 m)	man-made
35	Moosehead Lake	Maine	4,210,000 acre⋅ft (5.2 km^{3})	246 ft (75 m)	
36	Lake Okeechobee	Florida	4,210,000 acre⋅ft (5.2 km^{3})	12 ft (4 m)	
37	Kenai Lake	Alaska	4,130,087 acre⋅ft (5.1 km^{3})	541 ft (165 m)	
38	Kentucky Lake	Kentucky - Tennessee	4,008,000 acre⋅ft (4.9 km^{3})	60 ft (18 m)	man-made
39	Sam Rayburn Reservoir	Texas	3,997,000 acre⋅ft (4.9 km^{3})	80 ft (24 m)	man-made
40	Flaming Gorge Reservoir	Utah - Wyoming	3,788,900 acre⋅ft (4.7 km^{3})	436 ft (133 m)	man-made
41	Devils Lake	North Dakota	3,573,502 acre⋅ft (4.4 km^{3})	75 ft (23 m)	natural, endorheic. This volume was taken from the summer 2011 record peak of 1,454.4 ft (443.3 m) MSL. Devils Lake has experienced severe flooding and has risen more than 31 ft (9.4 m) since 1993. Volume has increased by 6 times.
42	Lake Oroville	California	3,537,577 acre⋅ft (4.4 km^{3})	695 ft (212 m)	man-made
43	Dworshak Reservoir	Idaho	3,468,000 acre*ft	632 ft	man-made
44	Hungry Horse Reservoir	Montana	3,467,179 acre⋅ft (4.3 km^{3})		man-made
45	Bull Shoals Lake	Arkansas - Missouri	3,400,000 acre⋅ft (4.2 km^{3})	204 ft (62 m)	man-made
46	Kerr Lake	Virginia - North Carolina	3,364,500 acre⋅ft (4.2 km^{3})	100 ft (30 m)	man-made
47	Lake Amistad	Mexico - Texas	3,159,270 acre⋅ft (3.9 km^{3})	200 ft (61 m)	man-made
48	Lake Francis Case	South Dakota	3,124,000 acre⋅ft (3.9 km^{3})	140 ft (43 m)	man-made
49	Mille Lacs Lake	Minnesota	2,782,736 acre⋅ft (3.4 km^{3})	42 ft (13 m)	
50	Lake Saint Clair	Michigan - Ontario	2,770,944 acre⋅ft (3.4 km^{3})	27 ft (8 m)	
51	Lake Ouachita	Arkansas	2,768,000 acre⋅ft (3.4 km^{3})	200 ft (61 m)	man-made
52	Table Rock Lake	Missouri - Arkansas	2,702,000 acre⋅ft (3.3 km^{3})	220 ft (67 m)	man-made
53	Torch Lake	Michigan	2,635,927 acre⋅ft (3.3 km^{3})	302 ft (92 m)	
54	Lake Texoma	Oklahoma - Texas	2,566,946 acre⋅ft (3.2 km^{3})	100 ft (30 m)	man-made
55	Lake Hartwell	Georgia - South Carolina	2,550,000 acre⋅ft (3.1 km^{3})	185 ft (56 m)	man-made
56	Trinity Lake	California	2,447,650 acre⋅ft (3.0 km^{3})	390 ft (119 m)	man-made
57	New Melones Lake	California	2,420,000 acre⋅ft (3.0 km^{3})	565 ft (172 m)	man-made
58	Mono Lake	California	2,407,820 acre⋅ft (3.0 km^{3})	159 ft (48 m)	
59	Lake George	New York	2,380,000 acre⋅ft (2.9 km^{3})	200 ft (61 m)	
60	Falcon Lake	Mexico - Texas	2,371,220 acre⋅ft (2.9 km^{3})	110 ft (34 m)	man-made
61	Lake Washington	Washington	2,350,000 acre⋅ft (2.9 km^{3})	214 ft (65 m)	
62	Leech Lake	Minnesota	2,300,000 acre⋅ft (2.8 km^{3})	156 ft (48 m)	
63	Eufaula Lake	Oklahoma	2,300,000 acre⋅ft (2.8 km^{3})	87 ft (27 m)	man-made
64	Lake Saint Francis	Ontario - Quebec - New York	2,269,997 acre⋅ft (2.8 km^{3})	27 ft (8 m)	man-made, part of St. Lawrence Seaway
65	Coeur d'Alene Lake	Idaho	2,269,996 acre⋅ft (2.8 km^{3})	220 ft (67 m)	
66	Walker Lake	Nevada	2,200,000 acre⋅ft (2.7 km^{3})	80 ft (24 m)	
67	Lake Cumberland	Kentucky	2,142,000 acre⋅ft (2.6 km^{3})	200 ft (61 m)	man-made
68	Lake Winnebago	Wisconsin	2,135,000 acre⋅ft (2.6 km^{3})	21 ft (6 m)	
69	Upper Red Lake	Minnesota	2,129,000 acre⋅ft (2.6 km^{3})	19 ft (6 m)	sometimes considered a single lake with Lower Red Lake (Minnesota)
70	Elephant Butte Lake	New Mexico	2,065,010 acre⋅ft (2.5 km^{3})	157 ft (48 m)	man-made
71	San Luis Reservoir	California	2,041,000 acre⋅ft (2.5 km^{3})	270 ft (82 m)	man-made
72	Don Pedro Reservoir	California	2,030,000 acre⋅ft (2.5 km^{3})	400 ft (122 m)	man-made
73	Lake of the Ozarks	Missouri	2,000,000 acre⋅ft (2.5 km^{3})	130 ft (40 m)	man-made
74	Lake Lanier	Georgia	1,957,000 acre⋅ft (2.41 km^{3})	160 ft (49 m)	man-made
75	Ray Roberts Lake	Texas	1,930,000 acre⋅ft (2.38 km^{3})	106 ft (32 m)	man-made
76	Greers Ferry Lake	Arkansas	1,910,000 acre⋅ft (2.36 km^{3})	160 ft (49 m)	man-made
77	Norfork Lake	Arkansas - Missouri	1,900,000 acre⋅ft (2.34 km^{3})	177 ft (54 m)	man-made
78	Canyon Ferry Lake	Montana	1,891,888 acre⋅ft (2.33 km^{3})	160 ft (49 m)	man-made
79	Lake Mohave	Arizona - Nevada	1,818,330 acre⋅ft (2.24 km^{3})	120 ft (37 m)	man-made
80	Lake McConaughy	Nebraska	1,756,300 acre⋅ft (2.17 km^{3})	135 ft (41 m)	man-made
81	Lake Livingston	Texas	1,750,000 acre⋅ft (2.16 km^{3})	90 ft (27 m)	man-made
82	Clarks Hill Lake	Georgia - South Carolina	1,730,000 acre⋅ft (2.13 km^{3})	180 ft (55 m)	man-made
83	Grand Lake o' the Cherokees	Oklahoma	1,672,000 acre⋅ft (2.06 km^{3})	164 ft (50 m)	man-made
84	American Falls Reservoir	Idaho	1,671,300 acre⋅ft (2.06 km^{3})	53 ft (16 m)	man-made
85	Lake Roosevelt	Arizona	1,653,043 acre⋅ft (2.04 km^{3})	349 ft (106 m)	man-made
86	Lake Martin	Alabama	1,626,000 acre⋅ft (2.01 km^{3})	150 ft (46 m)	man-made
87	Lake Sharpe	South Dakota	1,621,000 acre⋅ft (2.00 km^{3})	95 ft (29 m)	man-made
88	Lake Berryessa	California	1,602,000 acre⋅ft (1.98 km^{3})	275 ft (84 m)	man-made
89	Sardis Lake	Mississippi	1,512,000 acre⋅ft (1.87 km^{3})	76 ft (23 m)	man-made

Note: Volume estimates not available for Selawik and Naknek Lakes in Alaska. They would undoubtedly rank on this list if data available. Information other than otherwise noted from https://www.lakelubbers.com/, accessed 9 Mar 2011

== See also ==
- List of lakes of the United States by area
