= Eickelberg Peak =

Mountain in Alaska, United States

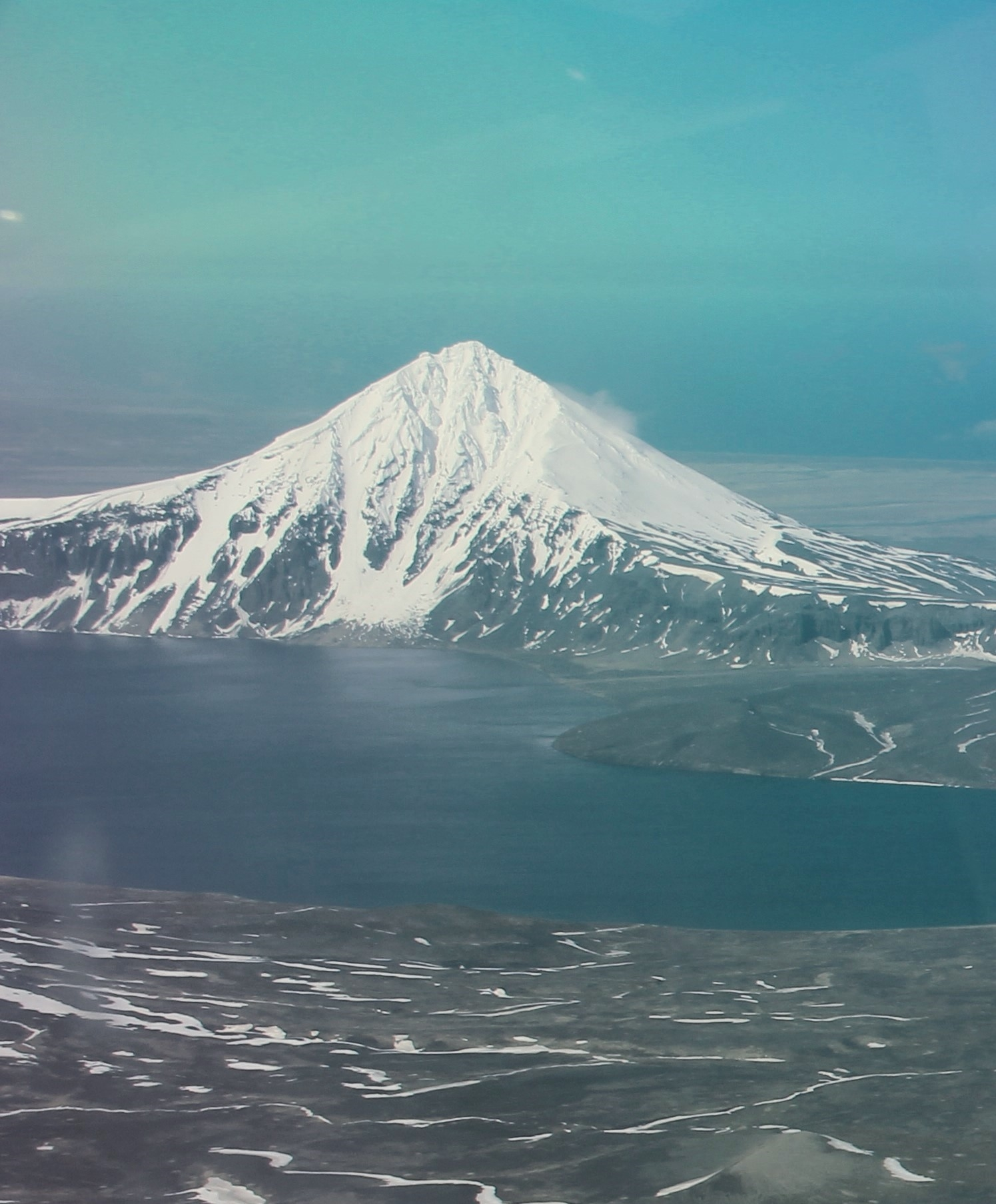
- Aerial view of east aspect

Highest point
- Elevation: 3,648 ft (1,112 m)
- Prominence: 3,298 ft (1,005 m)
- Parent peak: Westdahl Volcano (5,426 ft)
- Isolation: 9.72 mi (15.64 km)
- Coordinates: 54°40′35″N 164°28′52″W

Geography
- Location within Alaska
- Interactive map of Eickelberg Peak
- Country: United States
- State: Alaska
- Borough: Aleutians East
- Protected area: Aleutian Islands Wilderness
- Parent range: Aleutian Range
- Topo map: USGS Unimak C-2

Geology
- Formed by: Subduction zone volcanism
- Rock age: Late Pleistocene
- Mountain type: Stratovolcano
- Rock type: Andesitic
- Volcanic arc: Aleutian Arc

Eickelberg Peak is a 3,648-foot-elevation (1,112-meter) summit in Alaska, United States.

== Description ==
Eickelberg Peak is an Aleutian Range stratovolcano located along the west rim of Fisher Caldera on Unimak Island of the Aleutian Islands. Precipitation runoff from the mountain's east slope drains into the caldera and from the other slopes into tributaries of the Pogromni River. Topographic relief is significant as the summit rises approximately 3,050 feet (930 meters) above a caldera lake in less than one mile (1.6 km). The nearest community is False Pass, 44 miles (71 km) to the east-northeast. The mountain was named after Lieutenant Commander Ernest Werner Eickelberg (1890–1941), who was involved in triangulation and topography with the United States Coast and Geodetic Survey in Alaska. The mountain's toponym was published on a 1951 map by the United States Geological Survey and has been officially adopted by the United States Board on Geographic Names.

== Climate ==
According to the Köppen climate classification system, Eickelberg Peak is located in a subpolar oceanic climate zone with cold, snowy winters, and cool summers. Weather systems coming off the North Pacific are forced upwards by the mountains (orographic lift), causing heavy precipitation in the form of rainfall and snowfall. Winter temperatures can drop to 0 °F with wind chill factors below −10 °F.

== Gallery ==
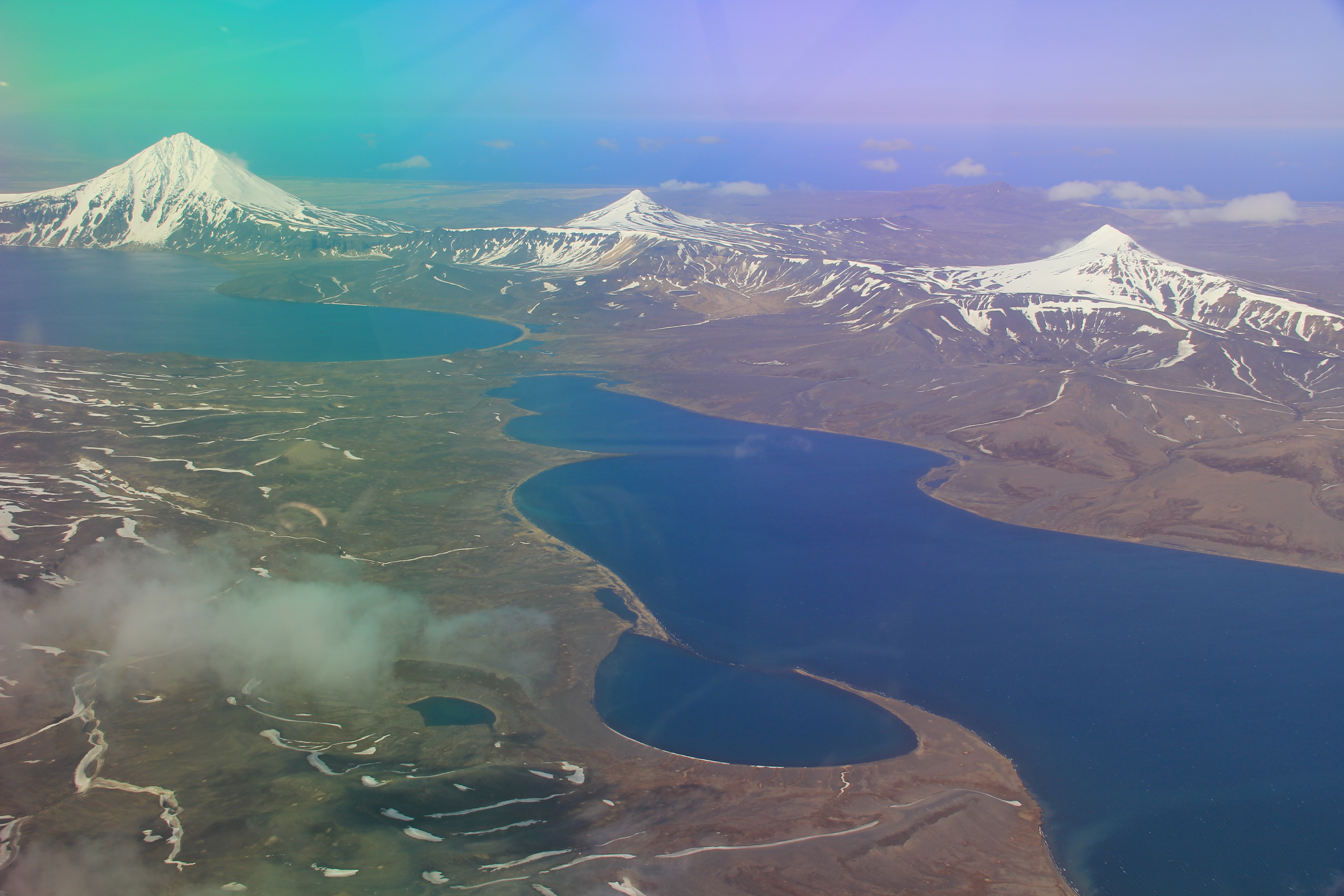
Aerial view of Fisher Caldera, with Eickelberg Peak in upper left corner

== See also ==
- List of mountain peaks of Alaska
