= King Salmon River (Egegik River tributary) =

- Location of the mouth of the King Salmon River in Alaska

Location
- Country: United States
- State: Alaska
- Borough: Lake and Peninsula

Physical characteristics
- Source: confluence of Contact and Takayofo creeks
  - location: Katmai National Park and Preserve
  - coordinates: 58°09′46″N 156°00′23″W
  - elevation: 482 ft (147 m)
- Mouth: Egegik River
  - location: 37 miles (60 km) southwest of Naknek, Alaska Peninsula
  - coordinates: 58°13′26″N 157°19′44″W
  - elevation: 0 ft (0 m)
- Length: 60 mi (97 km)

The King Salmon River is a 60-mile (97 km) tributary of the Egegik River on the western slope of the Alaska Peninsula in southwest Alaska. Formed by the confluence of Contact and Takayofo creeks along the southwest border of Katmai National Park and Preserve, it flows west-northwest to meet the larger river about 2 miles (3 km) east of the village of Egegik.

A relatively straight and braided river, it descends from an elevation of about 500 feet (152 m) to sea level. Being quite shallow, it is not navigable beyond its lower reaches. Although game fish on the river include king, chum, and silver salmon, the main species are rainbow trout, Arctic grayling, and char.

== See also ==
- List of Alaska rivers
