= List of largest lakes of the United States by area =

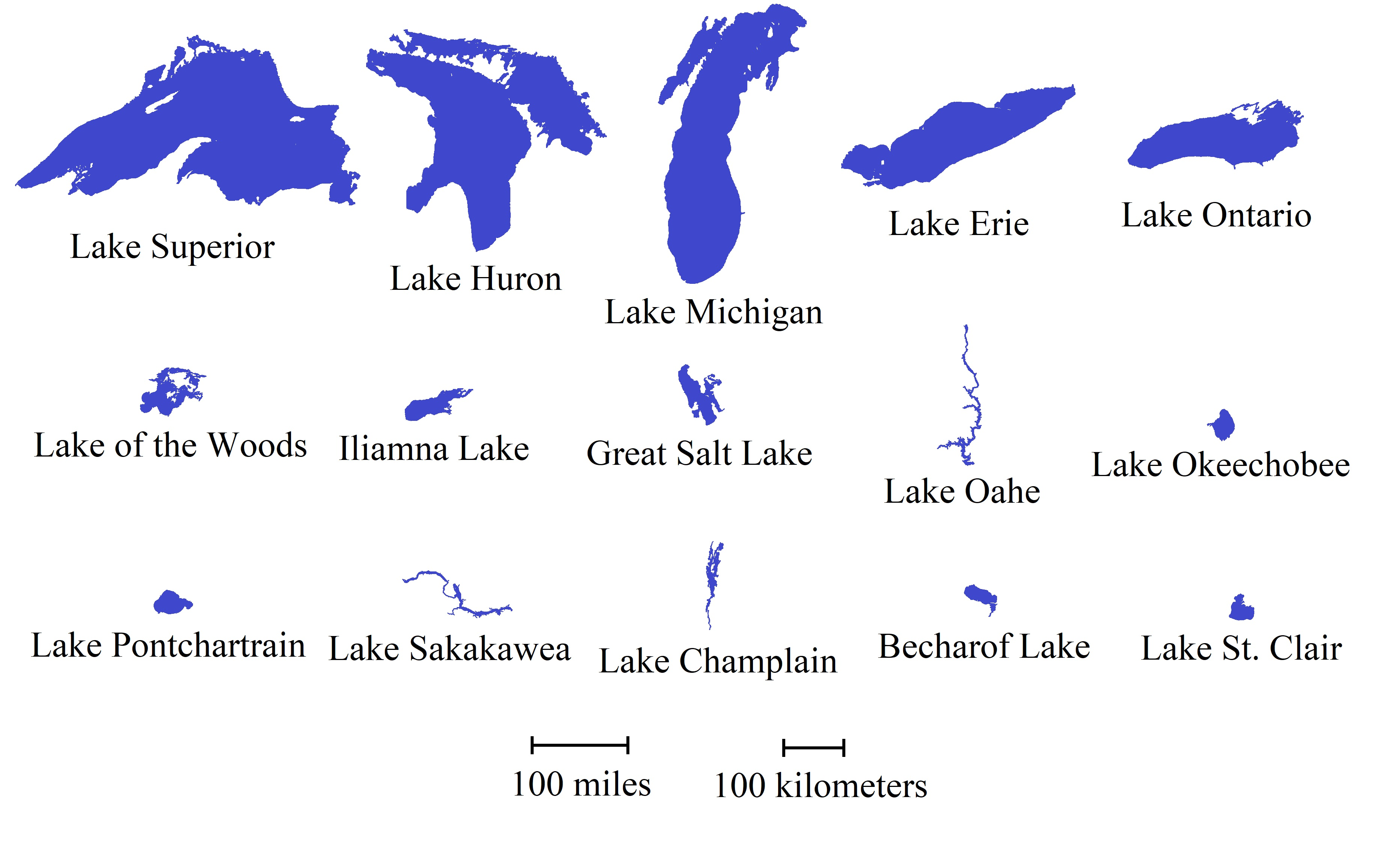
Scale depiction of the 15 largest lakes in the US

The following is a list of the 100 largest lakes of the United States by normal surface area. The top twenty lakes in size are as listed by the National Atlas of the United States, a publication of the United States Department of the Interior. The area given is the normal or average area of the lake. The area of some lakes fluctuates substantially. For those lakes partially in Canada or Mexico the area given for the lake is the total area, not just the part of the lake in the United States. Of the top 100 lakes, 55 are man-made and 45 are natural. Two lakes in the top 100 are primarily salt water, and two are primarily brackish water.

Rank	Name	U.S. states/Canadian provinces/Mexican states	Area		Type	Notes
1	Lake Superior	Michigan–Minnesota–Wisconsin–Ontario	31,700 sq mi	82,103 km^{2}	natural	Also largest lake of the United States by volume.
2	Lake Huron	Michigan–Ontario	23,000 sq mi	59,570 km^{2}	natural	
3	Lake Michigan	Illinois–Indiana–Michigan–Wisconsin	22,300 sq mi	57,757 km^{2}	natural	Largest freshwater lake located entirely within the United States.
4	Lake Erie	Michigan–New York–Ohio–Ontario–Pennsylvania	9,910 sq mi	25,667 km^{2}	natural	
5	Lake Ontario	New York–Ontario	7,340 sq mi	19,011 km^{2}	natural	
6	Lake of the Woods	Manitoba–Minnesota–Ontario	1,679 sq mi	4,349 km^{2}	natural	
7	Iliamna Lake	Alaska	1,014 sq mi	2,626 km^{2}	natural	Largest lake located entirely within a single state.
8	Great Salt Lake	Utah	950 sq mi	2,460 km^{2}	natural	Largest saltwater lake in the Western Hemisphere.
9	Lake Okeechobee	Florida	730 sq mi	1,891 km^{2}	natural	Florida's largest lake and the second-largest natural freshwater lake contained within the contiguous United States, after Lake Michigan.
10	Lake Oahe	North Dakota–South Dakota	685 sq mi	1,774 km^{2}	man-made	Largest man-made lake in the United States.
11	Lake Pontchartrain	Louisiana	631 sq mi	1,634 km^{2}	natural	Brackish
12	Lake Sakakawea	North Dakota	520 sq mi	1,347 km^{2}	man-made	
13	Lake Champlain	New York–Vermont–Quebec	490 sq mi	1,269 km^{2}	natural	
14	Becharof Lake	Alaska	453 sq mi	1,173 km^{2}	natural	
15	Lake St. Clair	Michigan–Ontario	440 sq mi	1,140 km^{2}	natural	
16	Red Lake	Minnesota	427 sq mi	1,106 km^{2}	natural	
17	Selawik Lake	Alaska	404 sq mi	1,046 km^{2}	natural	
18	Fort Peck Lake	Montana	393 sq mi	1,018 km^{2}	man-made	
19	Salton Sea	California	347 sq mi	899 km^{2}	accidental	72 meters (236 feet) below sea level. Twice as salty as the ocean.
20	Rainy Lake	Minnesota–Ontario	345 sq mi	894 km^{2}	natural	
21	Teshekpuk Lake	Alaska	320 sq mi	829 km^{2}	natural	
22	Devils Lake	North Dakota	300 sq mi	777 km^{2}	natural	
23	Toledo Bend Reservoir	Louisiana–Texas	284 sq mi	736 km^{2}	man-made	
24	Lake Powell	Arizona–Utah	251 sq mi	650 km^{2}	man-made	
25	Kentucky Lake	Kentucky–Tennessee	250 sq mi	647 km^{2}	man-made	
26	Lake Mead	Arizona–Nevada	247 sq mi	640 km^{2}	man-made	
27	Naknek Lake	Alaska	242 sq mi	627 km^{2}	natural	
28	Lake Winnebago	Wisconsin	215 sq mi	557 km^{2}	natural	
29	Mille Lacs Lake	Minnesota	207 sq mi	536 km^{2}	natural	
30	Flathead Lake	Montana	192 sq mi	497 km^{2}	natural	Largest (by surface area) natural fresh water lake west of the Mississippi River.
31	Lake Tahoe	California–Nevada	191 sq mi	495 km^{2}	natural	Largest ancient lake in the United States and largest (by volume) natural fresh water lake west of the Mississippi River.
32	Pyramid Lake	Nevada	183 sq mi	474 km^{2}	natural	
33	Sam Rayburn Reservoir	Texas	179 sq mi	464 km^{2}	man-made	
34	Eufaula Lake	Oklahoma	169 sq mi	438 km^{2}	man-made	
*	Tulare Lake	California	168 sq mi	435 km^{2}	natural	normally a dry lake, melting snowpack and rainfall have left Tulare Lake at 168 square miles as of June 2023
35	Lake Marion	South Carolina	165 sq mi	427 km^{2}	man-made	
36	Leech Lake	Minnesota	161 sq mi	417 km^{2}	natural	
37	Sardis Lake	Mississippi	153 sq mi	396 km^{2}	man-made	
38	Utah Lake	Utah	151 sq mi	391 km^{2}	natural	
39	Lake Francis Case	South Dakota	149 sq mi	386 km^{2}	man-made	
40	Lake Pend Oreille	Idaho	148 sq mi	383 km^{2}	natural	
41	Lake Texoma	Oklahoma–Texas	139 sq mi	360 km^{2}	man-made	
42	Yellowstone Lake	Wyoming	136 sq mi	352 km^{2}	natural	
43	Falcon Lake	Tamaulipas–Texas	131 sq mi	339 km^{2}	man-made	Largest lake shared between the United States and Mexico.
44	Lake Livingston	Texas	130 sq mi	337 km^{2}	man-made	
45	Franklin D. Roosevelt Lake	Washington	128 sq mi	332 km^{2}	man-made	
46	Lake Clark	Alaska	120 sq mi	311 km^{2}	natural	
47	Moosehead Lake	Maine	117 sq mi	303 km^{2}	natural	
48	Lake Strom Thurmond	Georgia–South Carolina	111 sq mi	287 km^{2}	man-made	
49	Bear Lake	Idaho–Utah	109 sq mi	282 km^{2}	natural	
50	Lake Guntersville	Alabama	108 sq mi	280 km^{2}	man-made	
51	Lake St. Francis	New York–Ontario–Quebec	105 sq mi	272 km^{2}	man-made	
51	Wheeler Lake	Alabama	105 sq mi	272 km^{2}	man-made	
53	Amistad Lake	Coahuila–Texas	102 sq mi	264 km^{2}	man-made	
54	Klamath Lake	Oregon	96 sq mi	249 km^{2}	natural	
55	Tustumena Lake	Alaska	94 sq mi	243 km^{2}	natural	
55	Lake Moultrie	South Carolina	94 sq mi	243 km^{2}	man-made	
57	Lake Winnibigoshish	Minnesota	91 sq mi	236 km^{2}	natural	
57	Lake Barkley	Kentucky–Tennessee	91 sq mi	236 km^{2}	man-made	
59	Lake Sharpe	South Dakota	89 sq mi	231 km^{2}	man-made	
60	American Falls Reservoir	Idaho	88 sq mi	228 km^{2}	man-made	
61	Lake Hartwell	Georgia–South Carolina	87 sq mi	225 km^{2}	man-made	
61	Truman Reservoir	Missouri	87 sq mi	225 km^{2}	man-made	
63	Lake of the Ozarks	Missouri	86 sq mi	223 km^{2}	man-made	
64	Oneida Lake	New York	80 sq mi	207 km^{2}	natural	
65	Lake Cumberland	Kentucky	79 sq mi	205 km^{2}	man-made	
66	Kerr Lake	North Carolina–Virginia	78 sq mi	202 km^{2}	man-made	
67	Calcasieu Lake	Louisiana	77 sq mi	199 km^{2}	natural	
68	Lake Murray	South Carolina	75 sq mi	194 km^{2}	man-made	
69	Grand Lake o' the Cherokees	Oklahoma	73 sq mi	189 km^{2}	man-made	
69	Lake Koocanusa	British Columbia–Montana	73 sq mi	189 km^{2}	man-made	
71	Lake George	Florida	72 sq mi	186 km^{2}	natural	Slightly brackish. Florida's second-largest lake.
72	Lake Winnipesaukee	New Hampshire	71 sq mi	184 km^{2}	natural	
72	Bull Shoals Lake	Arkansas–Missouri	71 sq mi	184 km^{2}	man-made	
74	Walter F. George Lake	Alabama–Georgia	71 sq mi	184 km^{2}	man-made	
75	Lake Martin	Alabama	69 sq mi	179 km^{2}	man-made	
76	Clear Lake	California	68 sq mi	176 km^{2}	natural	
76	Robert S. Kerr Lake	Oklahoma	68 sq mi	176 km^{2}	man-made	
76	Seneca Lake	New York	68 sq mi	176 km^{2}	natural	
79	Pickwick Lake	Alabama–Mississippi–Tennessee	67 sq mi	174 km^{2}	man-made	
79	Table Rock Lake	Arkansas–Missouri	67 sq mi	174 km^{2}	man-made	
79	Cayuga Lake	New York	67 sq mi	174 km^{2}	natural	
82	Flaming Gorge Reservoir	Utah–Wyoming	66 sq mi	171 km^{2}	man-made	
83	Richland-Chambers Reservoir	Texas	64 sq mi	166 km^{2}	man-made	
84	Lake Vermilion	Minnesota	63 sq mi	163 km^{2}	natural	
84	Lake Ouachita	Arkansas	63 sq mi	163 km^{2}	man-made	
84	Lake Mattamuskeet	North Carolina	63 sq mi	163 km^{2}	natural	
87	Watts Bar Lake	Tennessee	61 sq mi	158 km^{2}	man-made	
87	Lake Wallula	Oregon–Washington	61 sq mi	158 km^{2}	man-made	
89	Lake Lanier	Georgia	59 sq mi	153 km^{2}	man-made	
90	Lake Tawakoni	Texas	57 sq mi	148 km^{2}	man-made	
90	Elephant Butte Lake	New Mexico	57 sq mi	148 km^{2}	man-made	
90	Chickamauga Lake	Tennessee	57 sq mi	148 km^{2}	man-made	
93	Grenada Lake	Mississippi	55 sq mi	142 km^{2}	man-made	
93	Lake Kissimmee	Florida	55 sq mi	142 km^{2}	natural	Freshwater. Third-largest lake in Florida.
95	Lake McConaughy	Nebraska	55 sq mi	142 km^{2}	man-made	Freshwater. Largest lake in Nebraska
97	Lake Dardanelle	Arkansas	54 sq mi	140 km^{2}	man-made	
96	Norris Lake	Tennessee	53 sq mi	137 km^{2}	man-made	
96	Canyon Ferry Lake	Montana	53 sq mi	137 km^{2}	man-made	
99	Lake Chelan	Washington	52 sq mi	135 km^{2}	natural	
99	Cedar Creek Lake	Texas	51 sq mi	132 km^{2}	man-made	
99	Lake Norman	North Carolina	51 sq mi	132 km^{2}	man-made	

== See also ==
- List of lakes of the United States
- List of largest lakes of the United States by volume
