= Fisher Caldera =

Volcanic caldera in the Aleutian Islands of Alaska

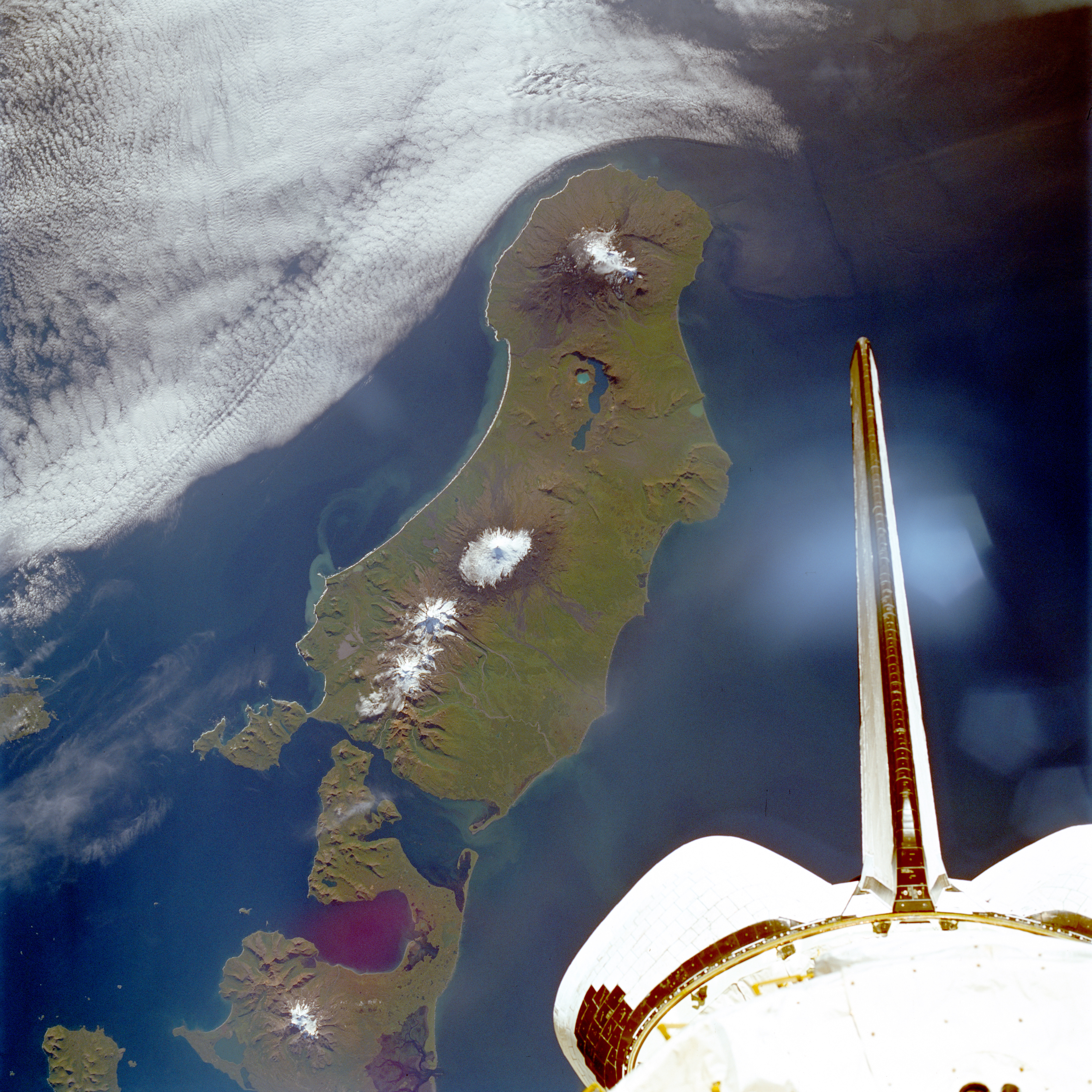
- Satellite picture of Unimak Island with Fisher Caldera

Highest point
- Elevation: 3,648 ft (1,112 m)
- Coordinates: 54°40′N 164°23′W

Geography
- Location: Unimak Island, Alaska, United States
- Parent range: Aleutian Range
- Topo map: USGS Unimak C4

Geology
- Mountain type: Stratovolcano remnant
- Volcanic arc: Aleutian Arc
- Last eruption: August 1830

Fisher Caldera, also known as Mount Fisher and Fisher Volcano, is a large volcanic caldera, measuring about 6.8 miles (11 km) by 11 miles (18 km), located on Unimak Island in the Aleutian Islands of Alaska. Formed by the destructive eruption of an andesitic stratovolcano about 9,100 years ago, it contains three crater lakes, one 2 miles (3.2 km) wide and two others about 1.5 miles (2.4 km) wide. Small peaks rising 2,000 feet (600 m) and 2,031 feet (619 m) are also present in the caldera. Fisher Caldera is located just 13 miles (21 km) from the Mount Westdahl volcano.

The largest volcanic eruption on Earth during the Holocene Epoch (the last 11,700 years) occurred at Fisher Caldera in 8700 BCE.

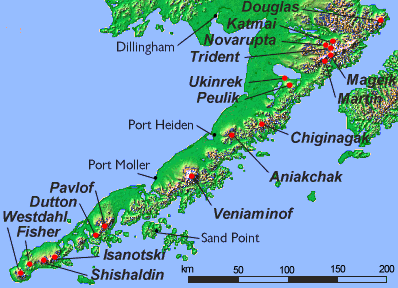
Maps of Alaskan volcanoes with Fisher Caldera

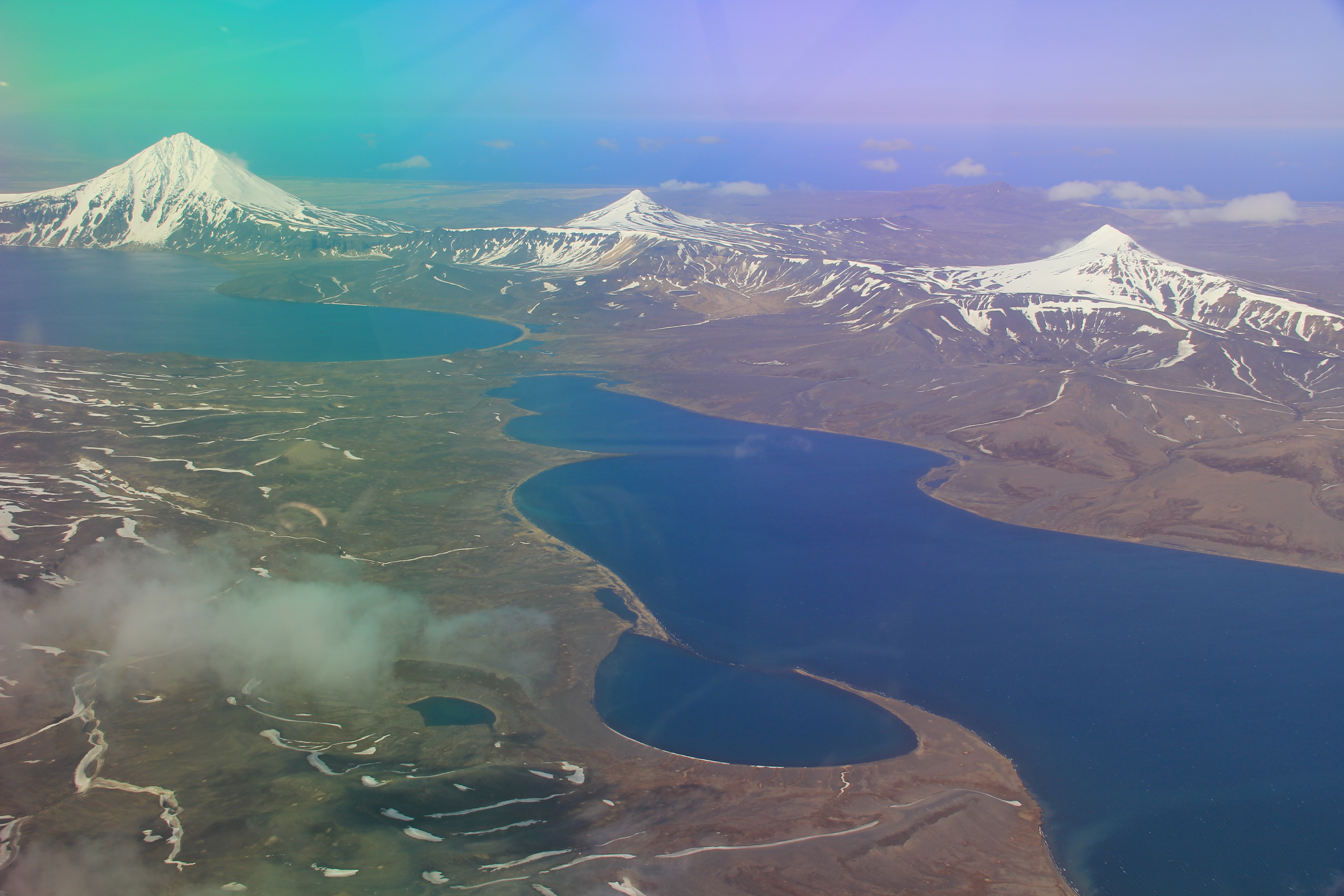
Aerial view of Fisher Caldera, with Eickelberg Peak in upper left corner

== See also ==
- List of volcanic craters in Alaska
- List of volcanoes in the United States
