= Pogromni Volcano =

Stratovocano in Alaska, United States

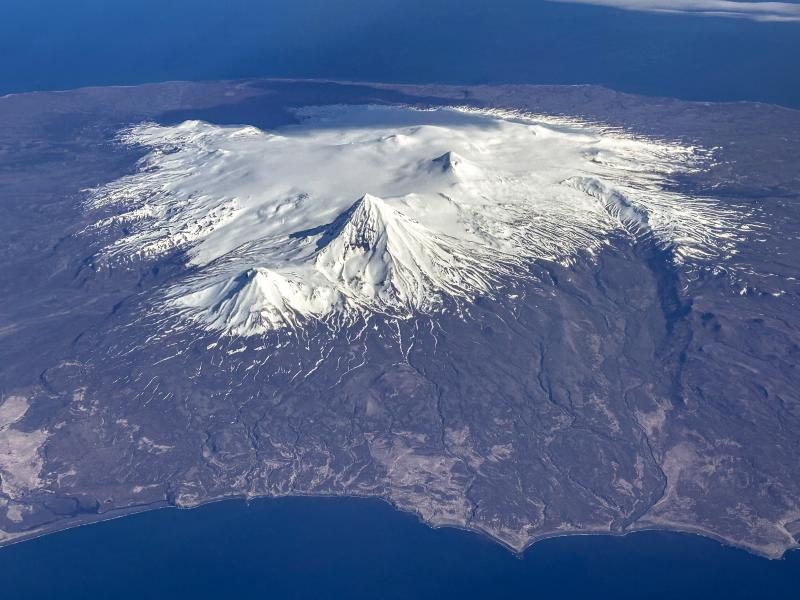
- Pogromni Volcano (tallest peak, center) as seen from a passing flight on June 3, 2026. Pogromni's Sister is located to the left of Pogromni, Faris Peak to the upper right and Westdahl Volcano beyond in the background. Photo taken by Michelle Coombs of the Alaska Volcano Observatory (USGS).

Highest point
- Elevation: 6,531 ft (1,991 m)
- Prominence: 6,131 ft (1,869 m)
- Listing: US most prominent peaks 56th
- Coordinates: 54°34′15″N 164°41′37″W

Geography
- Location within Alaska
- Location: Unimak Island, Alaska, USA
- Parent range: Aleutian Range
- Topo map: USGS Unimak C-2

Geology
- Formed by: Subduction zone volcanism
- Rock age: Pleistocene
- Mountain type: Stratovolcano
- Volcanic arc: Aleutian Arc
- Last eruption: Unknown

Pogromni Volcano is a stratovolcano on Unimak Island in the Aleutian Islands. Near it are 5 cinder cones, and a mountain called Pogromni's Sister.

Pogromni is old and eroded with a single glacier on its flank and base. Eruptions have been attributed to it in 1795, 1796, 1826, 1827, and 1830, but historic eruptions attributed to it may have come from nearby Westdahl Volcano.

== Etymology ==
The volcano's name comes from the Russian "Погромный," meaning "characterized by violent outbreak." This naming refers to a volcanic eruption, but shares the same etymology as pogrom, a Russian word referring to violent riots against an ethnic group, especially Jews.

== See also ==
- List of mountain peaks of North America
  - List of mountain peaks of the United States
    - List of mountain peaks of Alaska
- List of Ultras of the United States
- List of volcanoes in the United States
