= Egegik River =

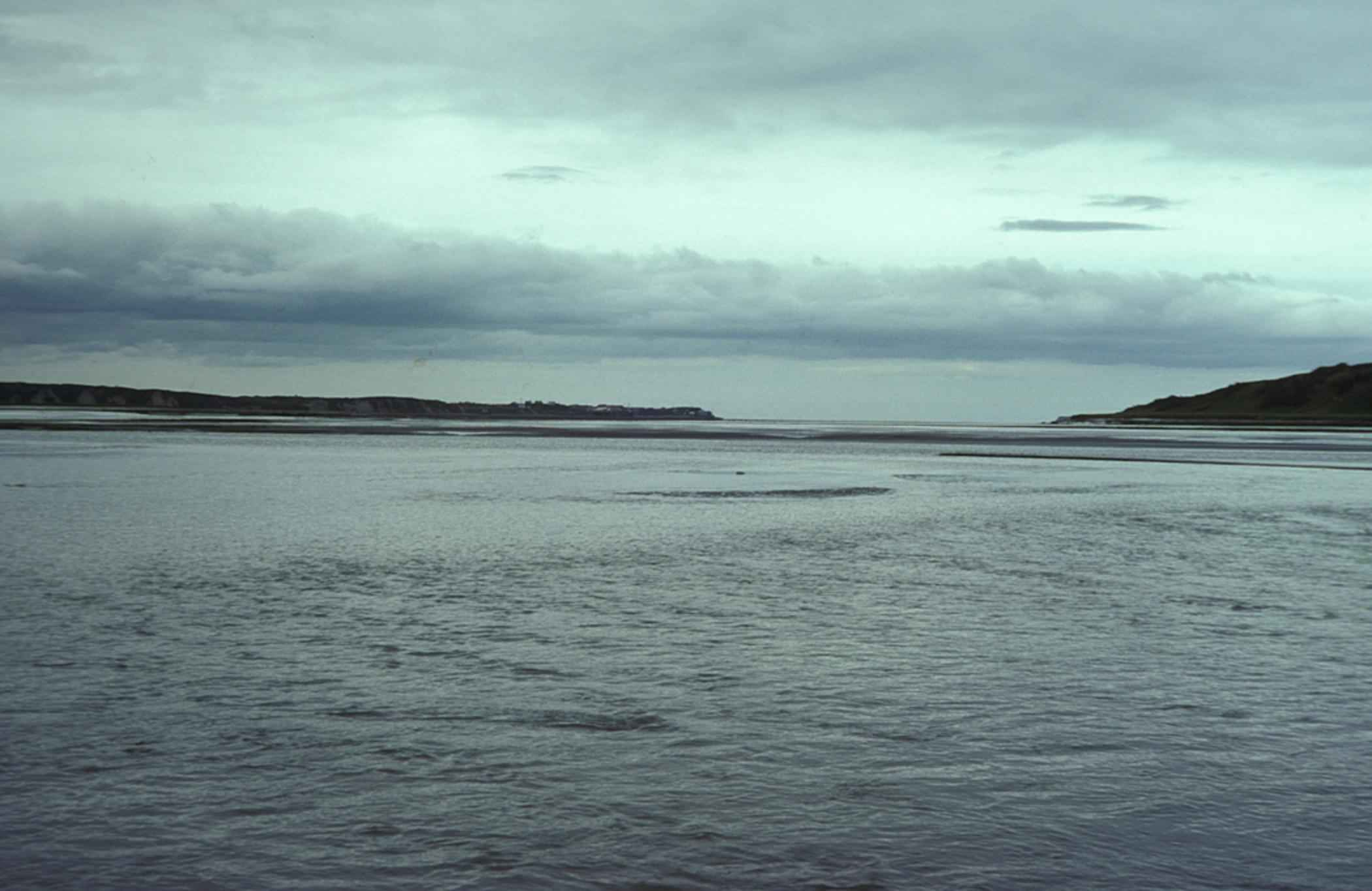
- Egegik Bay

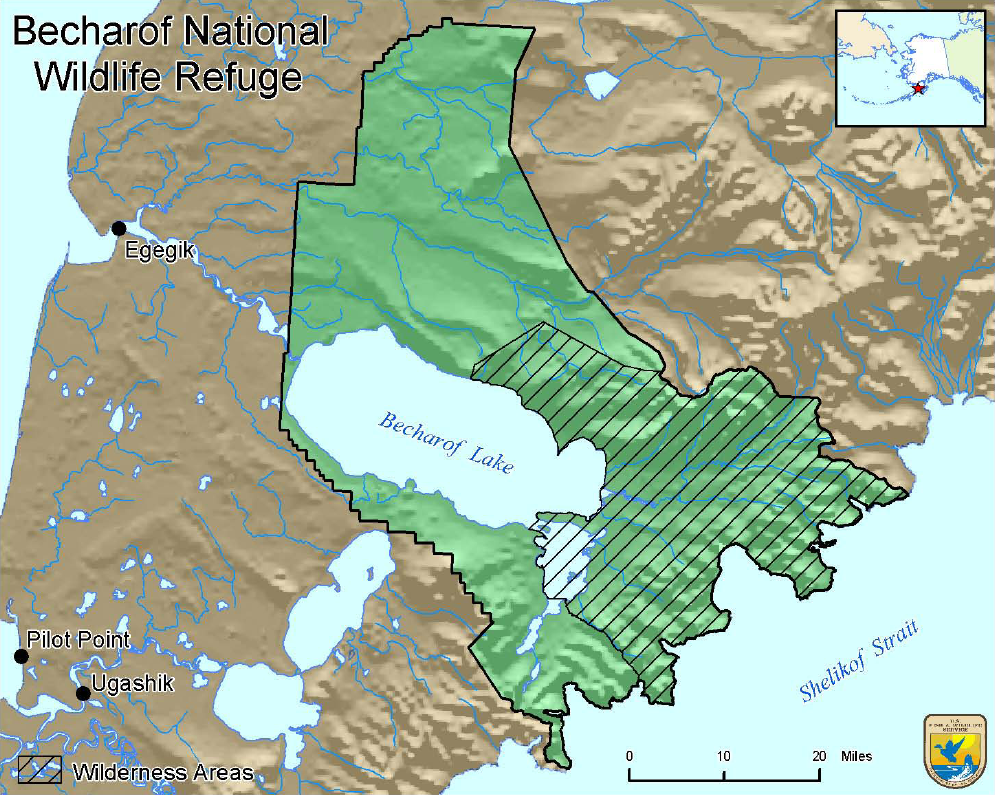
- The river begins in the Becharof National Wildlife Refuge

- Location of the mouth of the Egegik River in Alaska

Location
- Country: United States
- State: Alaska
- Borough: Lake and Peninsula

Physical characteristics
- Source: Becharof Lake
  - location: Becharof National Wildlife Refuge
  - coordinates: 58°02′25″N 156°50′26″W
  - elevation: 14 ft (4.3 m)
- Mouth: Egegik Bay
  - location: 38 miles (61 km) southwest of Naknek, Alaska Peninsula
  - coordinates: 58°12′19″N 157°25′07″W
  - elevation: 0 ft (0 m)
- Length: 28 mi (45 km)

The Egegik River (pronounced locally, I-ga-gik; Central Alaskan Yup'ik, Igyagiiq; translation, "swift") is a waterway in the U.S. state of Alaska. A biological survey was conducted at the base of the Alaska Peninsula in 1902 by Wilfred Hudson Osgood, which included the Egegik River.

== Etymology ==
The river has been known by other names and spellings: Ougagouk (1828); Ugaguk (obsolete except on Government maps) or Igagik (Russian variations); also variously Agouyak, lgiagik. Egegak. Ugiagik.

== Geography ==
The river is located on the Alaska Peninsula. Its watershed originates in the Aleutian Range before it flows westward from Becharof Lake into Bristol Bay via Egegik Bay, an arm of Kvichak Bay. Egegik rapids are reported at the outlet of Becharof Lake. The town of Egegik is situated at the mouth of the river. White bluff is situated on the river's north shore, just inside Cape Chichagof at Bristol Bay. The major tributaries are Kejulik River, Shosky Creek, and King Salmon River. The King Salmon River, which drains the area between Becharof and Naknek lakes, is the principal tributary to the Egegik from the north. Being 60 miles (97 km) in length, it enters about 7.5 miles (12.1 km) from the mouth of the Egegik. Becharof National Wildlife Refuge is nearby.

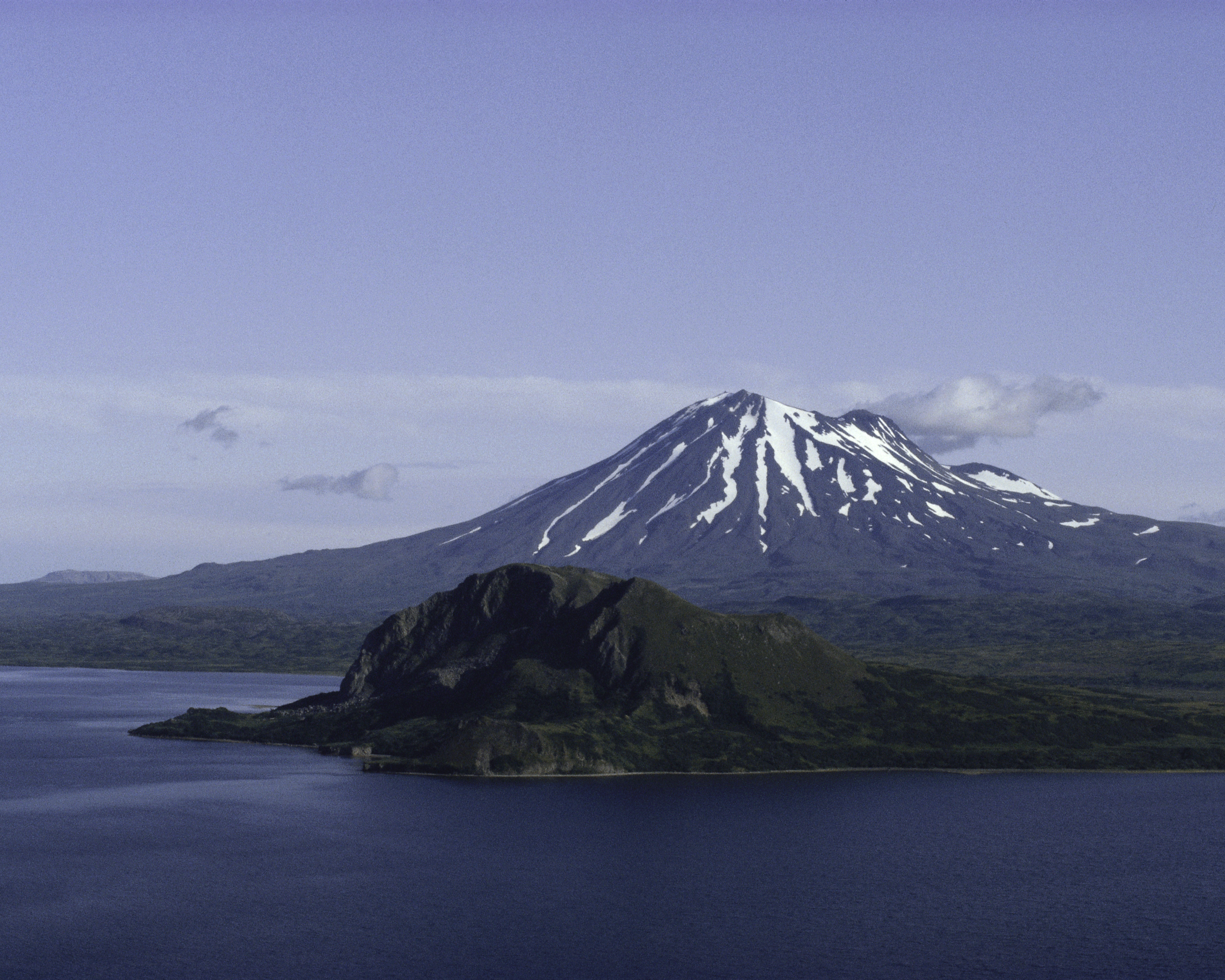
Egegik River heads at Becharof Lake (Peulik volcano in background).

Ugaguk River, the outlet of Lake Becharof, flows in a westerly direction for approximately 50 miles (80 km). It empties into the Kvichak Bay approximately 30 miles (48 km) north of Cape Greig with its northern entrance point at Cape Chichagof. Its tidewater extends 25 miles (40 km) up river and the river is navigable to within 10 miles (16 km) of the lake, where there is a succession of rapids. At low water, a large part of the river bed is exposed with shoals, banks, and narrow, winding channels. At the mouth, shoal water extends for several miles offshore.

== Fauna ==
Spawning of pink salmon most commonly occurs in the river in the month of August. The coho salmon spawning and rearing habitat is situated along the main stem of the river. The main stream of the river supports chum salmon. Arctic Char migrate down the river in late May. Lake Trout are found near at the lake's outlet to Egegik River.

== Economy ==
In 1895, the Alaska Packers Association established a fishing station on the right bank about 5 miles (8 km) from the mouth and operated as a saltery until 1900, when the operations was moved to the cannery site. In 1899, the Alaska Packers Association, under the name of the Egegak Packing Company, began construction of a cannery on the left bank opposite and a little above the salting station; it was finished in 1900. In 1903, the North Alaska Salmon Company built and operated a cannery on the opposite shore from the Alaska Packers Association; it changed its name after several years to that of its new owners, Libby, McNeill & Libby. The cannery plants operated about 6 miles (10 km) from the mouth, the river being about 2 miles (3 km) wide at the point of the canneries. Only gillnetting was employed for commercial fishing, with fishing operations occurring from about 3 miles (5 km) above the canneries to the South Spit, near the mouth. Gill nets only were employed, and the catch included king salmon (Chinook), dog salmon (chum salmon, canned under a pink salmon label), and coho salmon.

In the mid-1980s, there was one shore based processor/buyer at Egegik, with eight others working by other rivers in the locale. The Egegik District maintained 22 floating stations and had 492 drift net permit holders. Three-quarters of all personal use salmon came from the commercially caught fish.

== See also ==
- List of rivers of Alaska
