= Egegik Bay =

Coordinates: 58°11′N 157°28′W

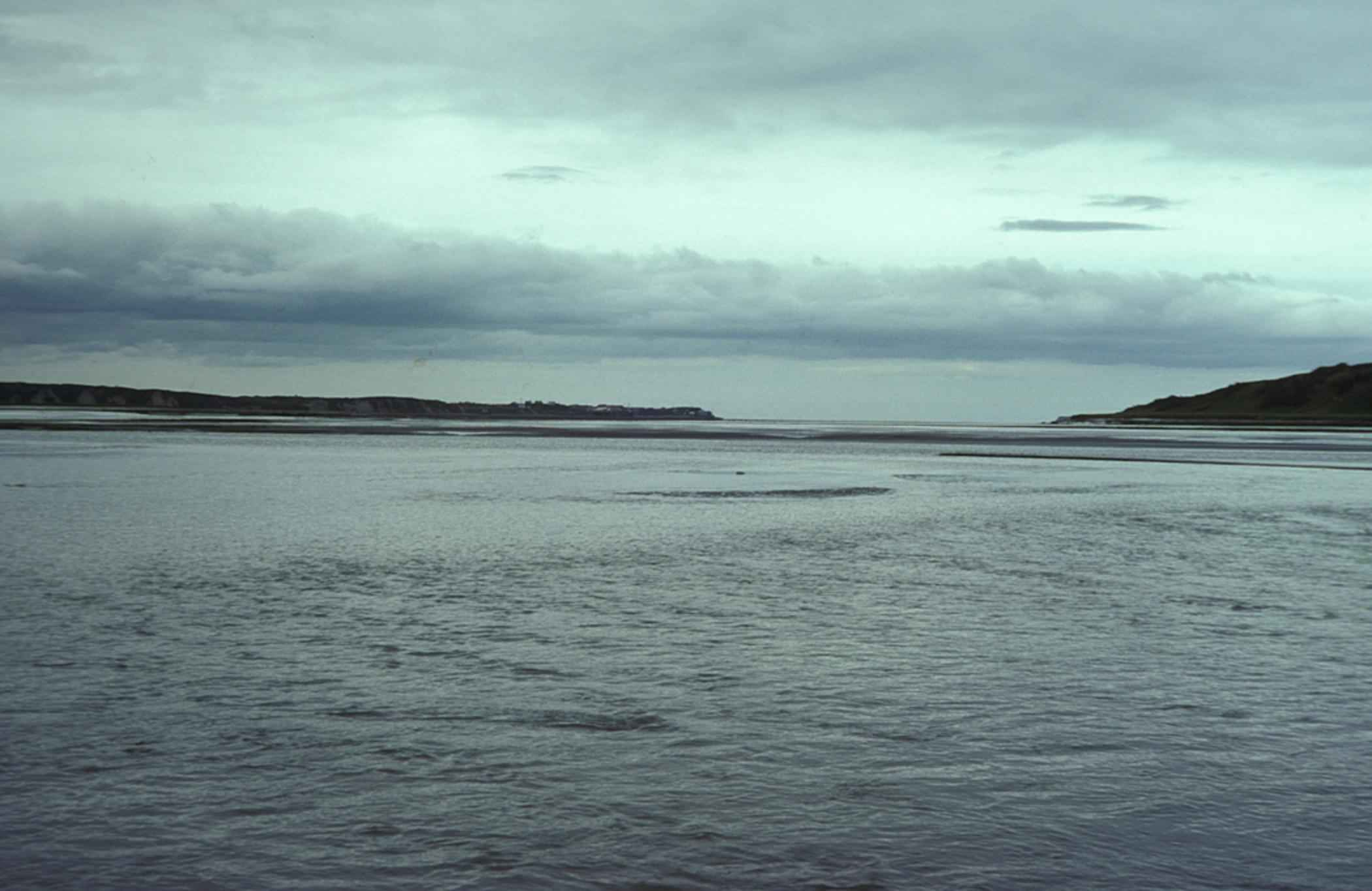

Egegik Bay (Yup'ik: Igyagiim painga) is a bay located just 69.1 miles from Dillingham in Alaska and the northeastern arm of the Bristol Bay. The Egegik (Igyagiiq in Yup'ik) village is located on a high bluff along the southern shore of the Egegik River at the upper extent of Egegik Bay. The nearest places to Egegik Bay are Coffee Point (3 km north), Coffee Point (4 km north), Goose Point (4 km north), Egegik Airport (5 km west), and Bartletts Airport (6 km north).

== History ==
The first recorded contact by non-Natives was with Russian fur traders between 1818 and 1867. The Egegik Yupik is one of the five Central Alaskan Yup'ik dialects. Local people are Central Alaskan Yup'ik people and would travel each year from Kanatak (an Alutiiq village) on the Gulf coast through a portage pass to Becharof Lake (south-east of Egegik). From there they would hike or kayak on to the Egegik Bay are for the summer fish camp.

== Nature ==
Although tideland areas adjacent to the coast are important for providing habitat to some species of birds as well as harbor seals, by far the most important and sensitive habitat area occurs at the mouth of the Egegik River within Egegik Bay. The remainder of Egegik Bay is included within tideland management unit R12T-02 and contains extensive areas of eelgrass, harbor seal haulouts, and waterfowl use. Beluga whales are present in the northern part of Region 12, although Egegik Bay is not known to contain calving areas.

== Fishing ==
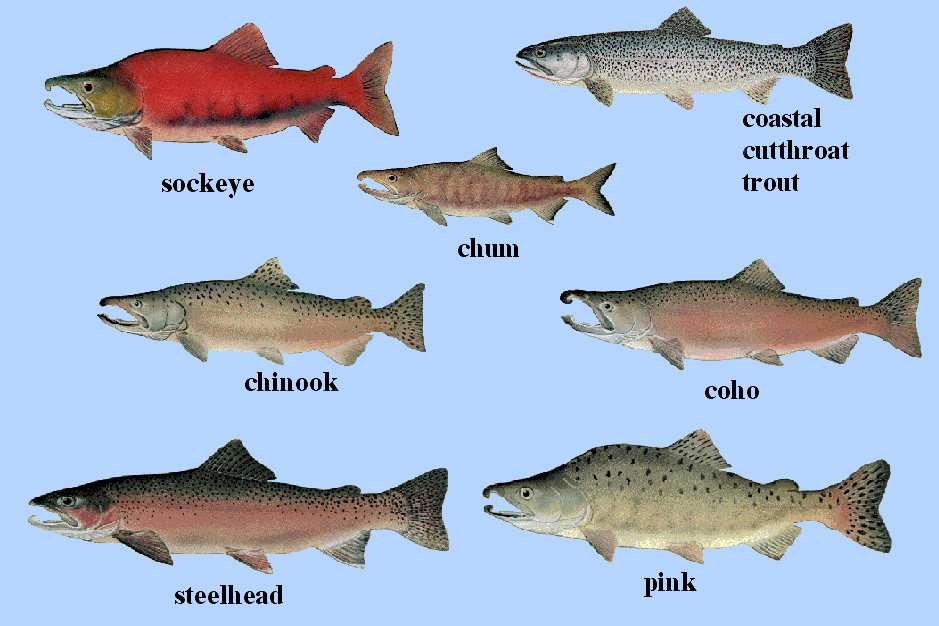

The Egegik Community (R12T-03) is a major commercial Pacific salmon fishing area. Pink, chum, sockeye, coho and chinook salmon are harvested (drift net) commercially in Egegik Bay (R12T-01 & R12T-02) and at the mouth of the Egegik River. Fishermen will find a variety of fish including coho salmon, dolly varden and pink salmon here.

Latin	American English	Alaskan English	Central Alaskan Yup'ik
Oncorhynchus tshawytscha	Chinook salmon	King salmon	Taryaqvak
Oncorhynchus nerka	Sockeye salmon	Red salmon	Sayak
Oncorhynchus keta	Chum salmon	Dog salmon	Kangitneq
Oncorhynchus kisutch	Coho salmon	Silver salmon	Qakiiyaq
Oncorhynchus gorbuscha	Pink salmon	Humpback salmon	Amaqaayak
Salvelinus malma	Dolly Varden	Trout or Char	Yugyaq
