= Westdahl Volcano =

Mountain in the state of Alaska

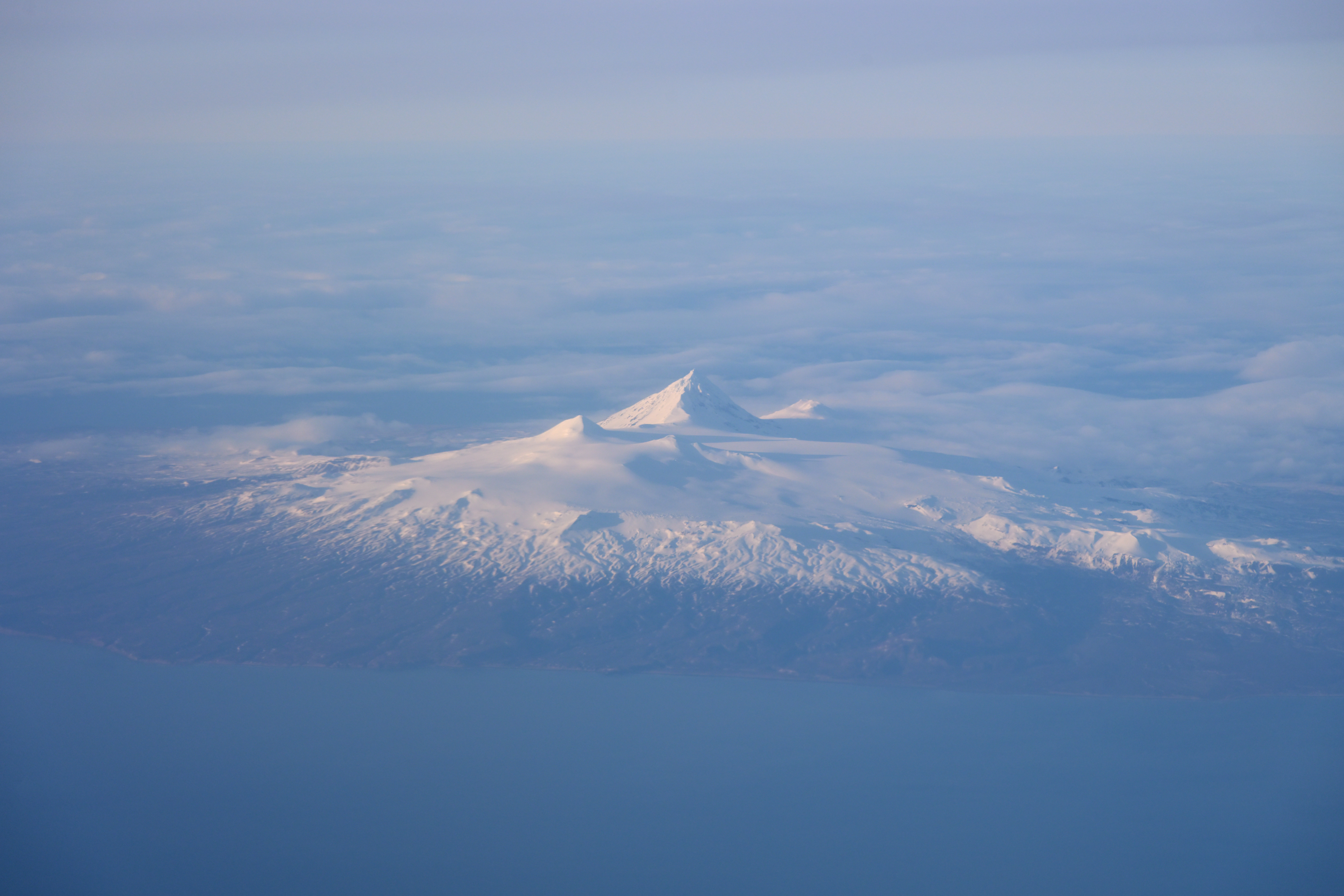
- The peaks of Westdahl (center foreground) and Faris (left foreground), as seen in 2026 from a passing trans-Pacific flight. Pogromni (tallest peak, center) and Pogromni's Sister are located in the background.

Highest point
- Elevation: 5,426 ft (1,654 m)
- Prominence: 1,365 ft (416 m)
- Coordinates: 54°31′05″N 164°39′00″W

Geography
- Location within Alaska
- Location: Unimak Island, Alaska, USA
- Parent range: Aleutian Range
- Topo map: USGS Unimak C-2

Geology
- Formed by: Subduction zone volcanism
- Rock age: Holocene
- Mountain type: Stratovolcano
- Volcanic arc: Aleutian Arc
- Last eruption: 1991 to 1992

Westdahl Peak, also known as Westdahl Volcano or Mount Westdahl, is a stratovolcano of the Aleutian Range, in the U.S. state of Alaska. The volcano last erupted from November 29, 1991, to January 15, 1992.

It is on Unimak Island, near the western tip of the Alaska Peninsula. The volcano has a second summit, called Faris Peak, which is actually the highest point at 5,426 feet (1,654 m). Westdahl Peak currently has a summit elevation of 5,118 feet (1,560 m).

Other historical eruptions, all attributed to Westdahl by the Alaska Volcano Observatory, have been reported in 1795–1796, 1827–1829, 1951, 1964 and 1978. A couple eruptions were originally reported to be from nearby Pogromni Volcano, but the peak is old, eroded and most likely hasn't erupted since Pleistocene time.

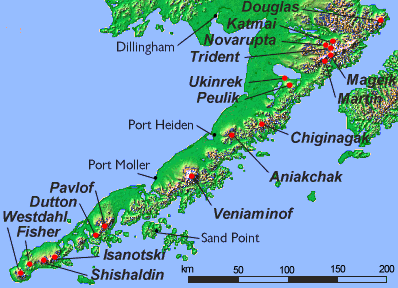
Map showing volcanoes of Alaska Peninsula

== See also ==
- Fisher Caldera — also on Unimak Island.
- Alaska Volcano Observatory
