= Umnak Pass =

Coordinates: 53°21′25″N 167°49′20″W

Umnak Pass, is a strait between the Bering Sea and the North Pacific Ocean in the Aleutian Islands in Alaska. It lies between Unalaska Island to the northeast and Umnak Island to the southwest.
