= Red Lake (Minnesota) =

Lake in Minnesota, United States

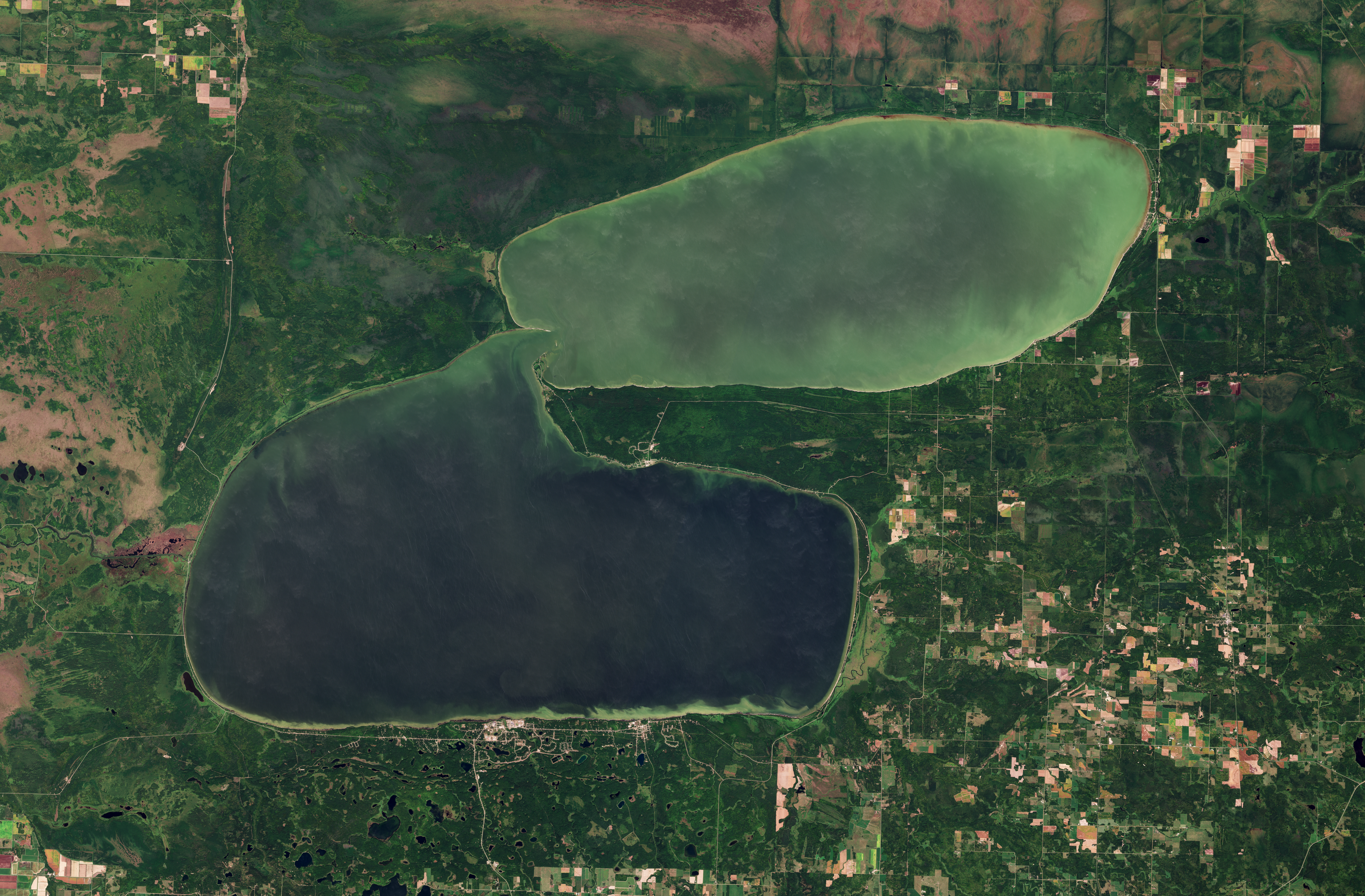
- Satellite image

- Location within Minnesota Location within the United States

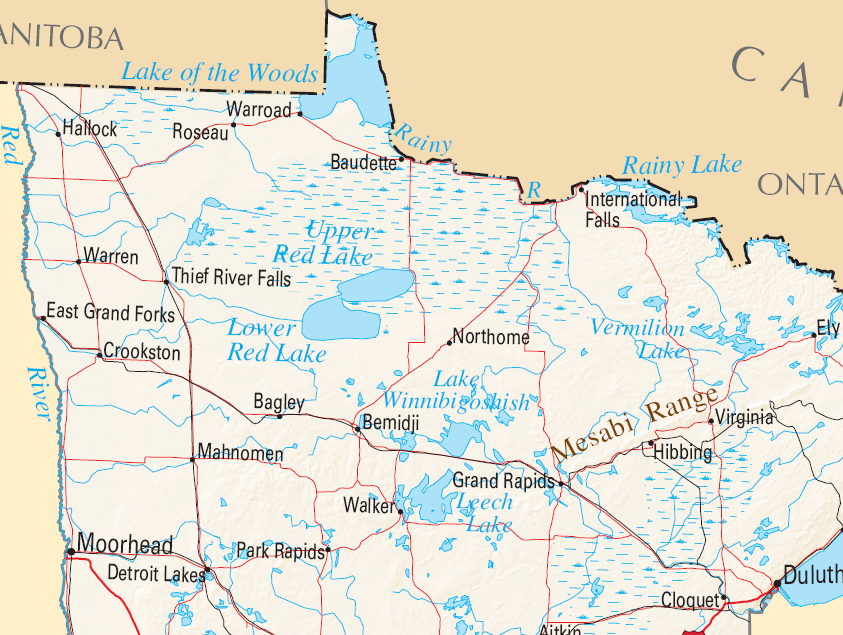
- Lakes in Northern Minnesota
- Location: Beltrami County, Minnesota, United States
- Coordinates: 48°04′25″N 95°01′44″W
- Type: Dam-controlled proglacial lake
- Primary outflows: Red Lake River
- Basin countries: United States
- Surface area: 440 sq mi (1,150 km^{2})
- Max. depth: 35 ft (11 m)
- Surface elevation: 1,175 ft (358 m)

Red Lake (translated from the Ojibwe language Miskwaagamiiwi-zaaga'igan: Lake with its liquid [water] be colored red) is a lake in Beltrami County in northern Minnesota.

It is the largest natural freshwater lake located entirely within Minnesota, and the 16th largest lake in the United States. The lake is separated into two sections by a peninsula on the eastern side that almost bisects it in the middle. The community of Ponemah lies on the peninsula. The two parts of the lake are known as Upper Red Lake and Lower Red Lake. Lower Red Lake lies entirely within the Red Lake Indian Reservation. The western half of Upper Red Lake is included within the reservation boundary. Total size is 444 square miles (1,150 km^{2}), with a maximum depth of 33 feet (10 m) in the lower portion of the lake. The elevation of the lake is maintained by a dam at the outflow that is the beginning of Red Lake River, this being at the middle, western edge of Lower Red Lake.

The lake is a popular destination for ice fishing. In the early 2022 fishing season an incident occurred, involving around 200 people laying on the ice sheet on Upper Red Lake. The ice sheet ruptured isolating them over a floating ice bank which separated by over 90 feet (27 m) from the contiguous ice. They had to be rescued. A similar incident, requiring the rescue of 122 anglers, happened in late December 2023.

== History ==
Red Lake is a proglacial lake which was once a part of the much larger Glacial Lake Agassiz.

=== Legendary origin ===
An Ojibwe story tells of a conflict between Paul Bunyan and Nanabozho (or Wenabozho) "the Greatest Ojibwe who ever lived." Paul Bunyan came to the area to cut down all the trees. Nanabozho fought him for three days to protect the forest, finally slapping Bunyan with a huge walleye. The giant Bunyan was knocked onto his buttocks in the mud, the imprint of which formed Red Lake. This is what gave the lake its distinctive shape and preserved the forests in the Red Lake Band of Chippewa area.

== Ecology ==
Species of fish present in Red Lake include bigmouth buffalo, black bullhead, black crappie, bluegill, brown bullhead, burbot, freshwater drum, golden redhorse, goldeye, lake trout, lake whitefish, lake sturgeon, largemouth bass, muskie, northern pike, quillback, rock bass, shorthead redhorse, walleye, white sucker, and yellow perch.

== See also ==
Red Lake Indian Reservation
