= Becharof Lake =

Lake in Alaska, United States

- From space

- Location within Alaska
- Location: Lake and Peninsula Borough, Alaska
- Coordinates: 57°57′08″N 156°22′36″W
- Basin countries: United States
- Max. length: 37 mi (60 km)
- Surface area: 453 sq mi (1,170 km^{2})
- Surface elevation: 13 ft (4.0 m)

Becharof Lake is a 37-mile (60 km) long lake on the Alaska Peninsula. It is located 23 miles (37 km) south-east of Egegik, in the Aleutian Range. It is the second largest lake in Alaska after Iliamna Lake. It ranks eighth on list of largest lakes of the United States by volume and fourteenth on list of largest lakes of the United States by area.

== History ==
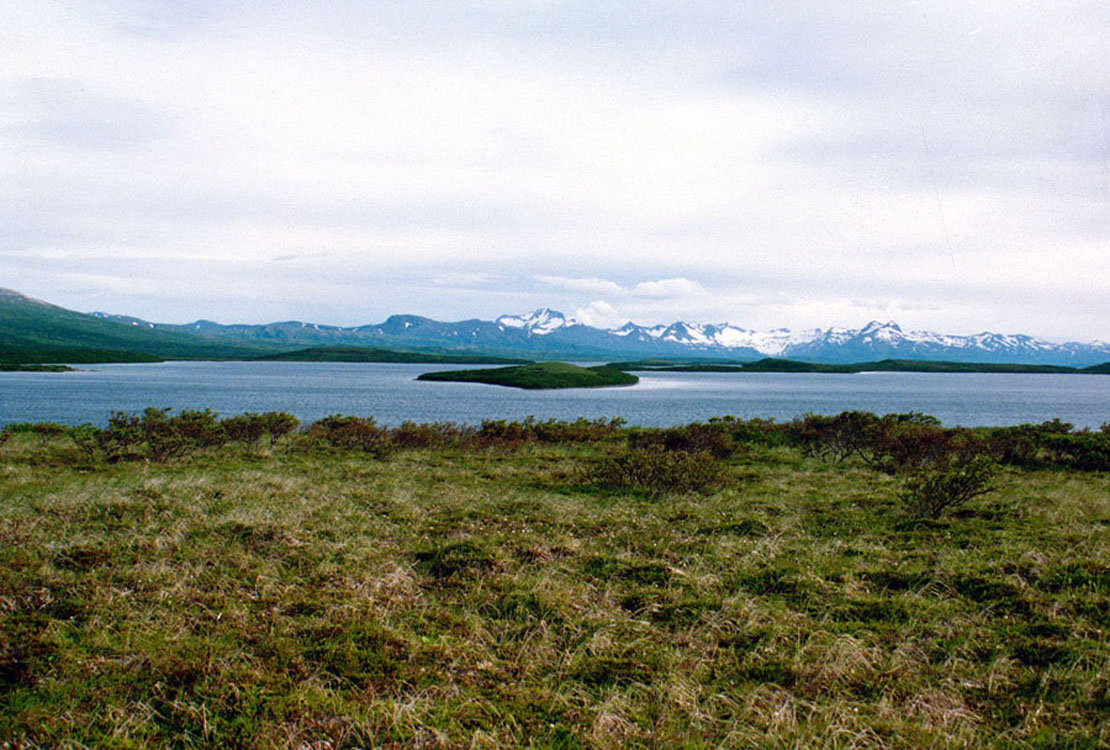
Becharof Refuge Lake

Russian navigator Dmitry Bocharov of the Imperial Russian Navy explored at Kodiak, Alaska, in 1788, and returned to Alaska in 1791. In late spring 1791, Alexander Andreyevich Baranov, chief manager of the Shelikhov-Golikov Company in Russian America, ordered Bocharov to explore the northwest shore of the Alaska Peninsula. His orders directed him to seek a portage across the peninsula near Kodiak. Twenty to thirty men crewed two 30-foot (9.1 m) walrus-skin-covered open boats under his command. They sailed and paddled from Unalaska Island along the northwest shore of the Alaska Peninsula as far as Bristol Bay via Egegik Bay. In search of a portage, he traveled up the Egegik River into a large inland lake. This lake now bears his name with an Americanized spelling: Becharof Lake. He probed the lake to its most eastern extent in the summer of 1791. After making a portage from the easternmost point of the lake to the North Pacific Ocean, he returned to Kodiak and reported his findings to Baranov.

The Russian Hydrological Department published the name "Oz(ero) Ugashek" on Chart 1455 in 1852.

The Alaska Purchase of 1867 transferred the territory from the Russian Empire to the United States. Naturalist William Healey Dall of the Smithsonian Institution, later Acting Assistant to the United States Coast Survey, named the lake in 1868.
