= Becharof National Wildlife Refuge =

Protected area in Alaska, United States

Coordinates: 58°00′N 156°15′W

- IUCN category IV (habitat/species management area)
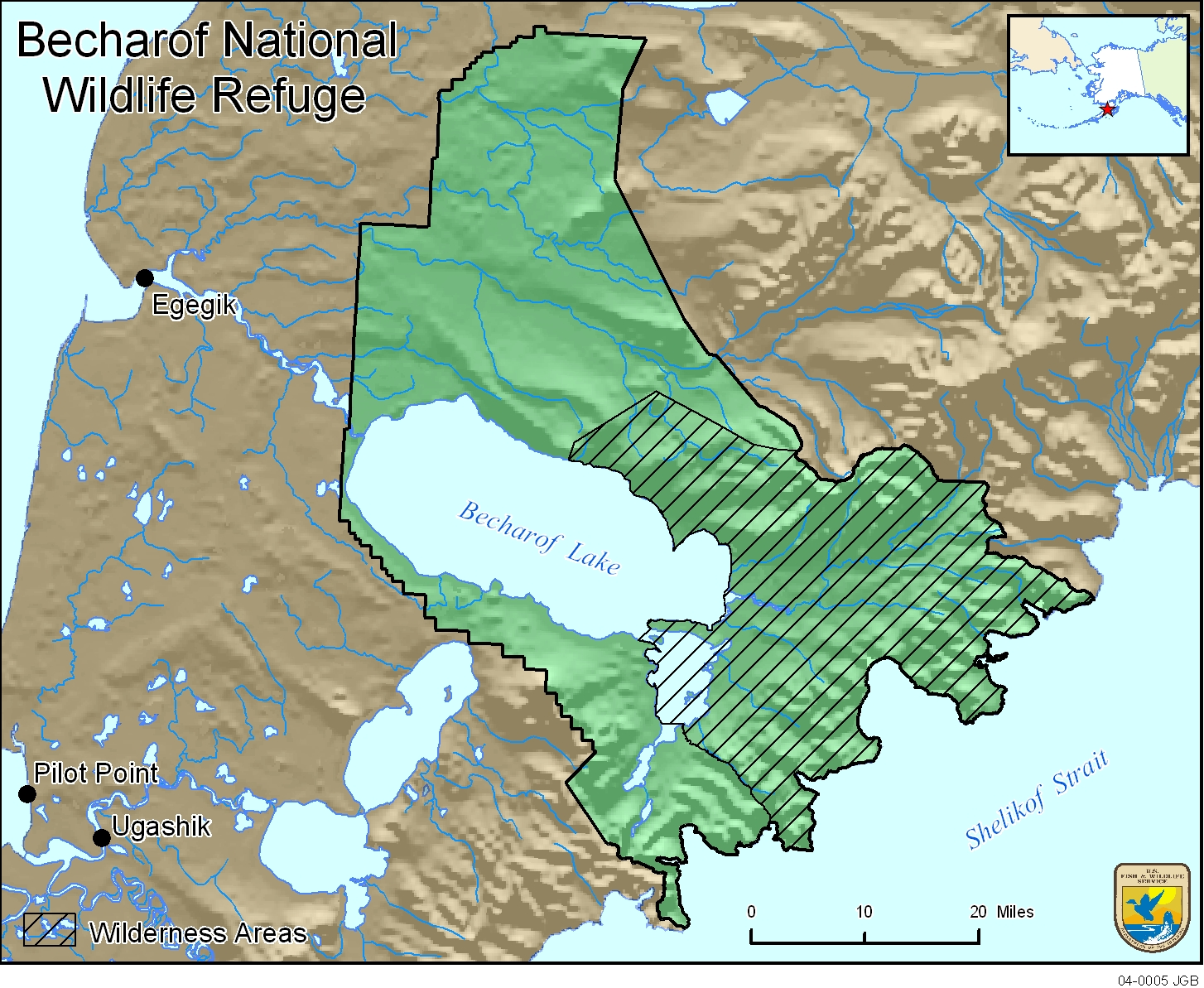
- FWS map of Becharof NWR
- Interactive map of Becharof National Wildlife Refuge
- Location: Alaska Peninsula, Alaska, United States
- Nearest city: King Salmon, Alaska
- Area: 1,200,000 acres (4,860 km^{2})
- Established: December 2, 1980
- Governing body: U.S. Fish and Wildlife Service
- Website: becharof.fws.gov

Becharof National Wildlife Refuge is a National Wildlife Refuge in the Aleutian Range of the Alaska Peninsula of southwestern Alaska. It is adjacent to Katmai National Park and Preserve. This national wildlife refuge, which covers an area of 1,200,000 acres (4,900 km^{2}), was established in 1980 to conserve major brown bears, salmon, migratory birds, caribou, marine birds, and mammals and to comply with treaty obligations. It lies primarily in the east-central part of Lake and Peninsula Borough, but extends eastward into the mainland portion of Kodiak Island Borough. The refuge is administered from offices in King Salmon.

Becharof Wilderness it comprises approximately 500,000 acres (2,000 km^{2}) and is bordered by the Katmai Wilderness on the north. It was designated a wilderness area in 1980 by the Alaska National Interest Lands Conservation Act.

== History ==
Jimmy Carter created Becharof National Monument by presidential proclamation on December 1, 1978. The refuge was established on December 2, 1980 by the Alaska National Interest Land Conservation Act (ANILCA). In 1983, the Fish and Wildlife Service undertook the responsibility to manage the Becharof Refuge, along with the Ugashik and Chignik units of the Alaska Peninsula National Wildlife Refuge.

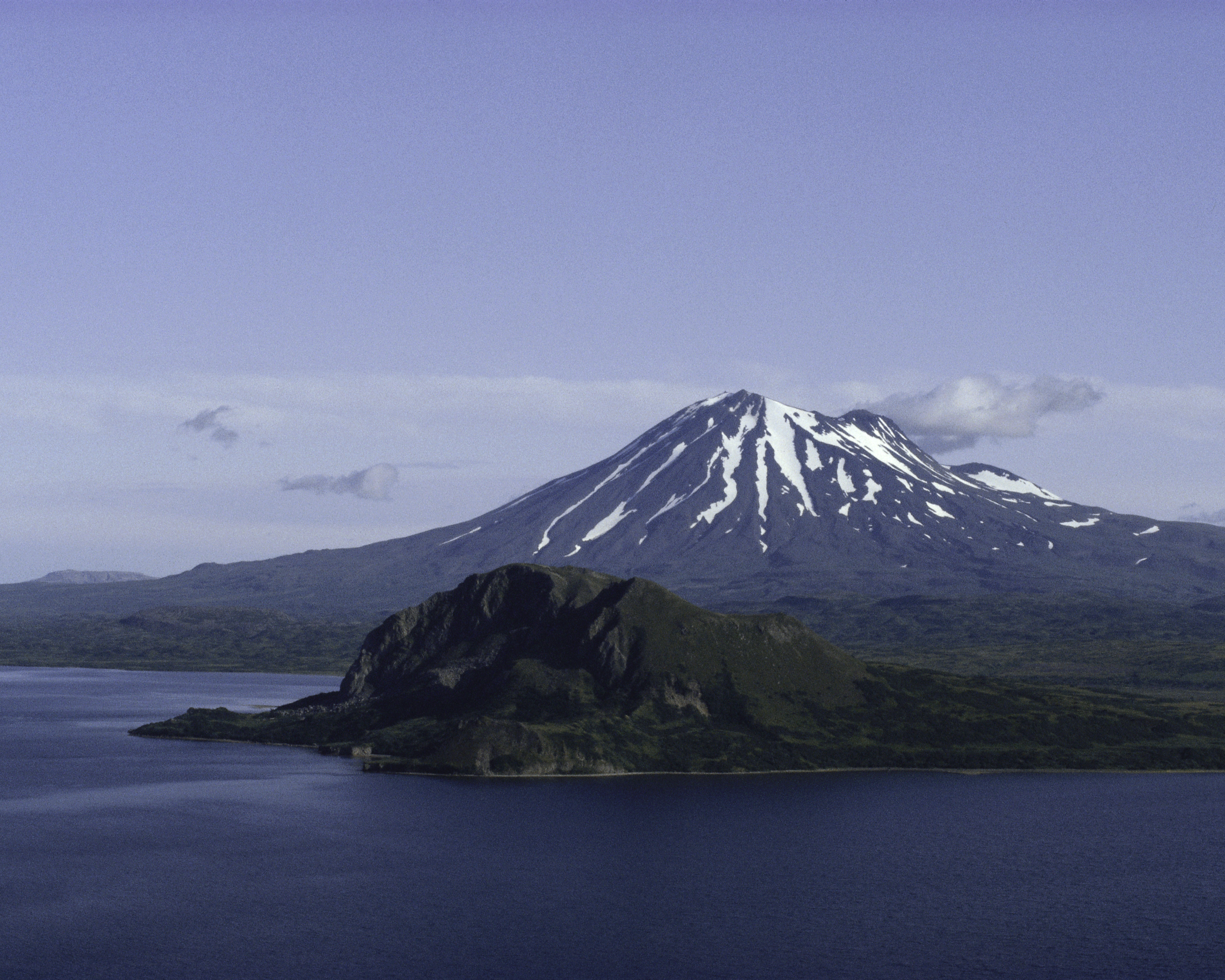
View of Becharof Lake with Ugashik-Peulik in the background.

In 1989 the park areas was heavily affected by the Exxon Valdez Oil Spill which devastated the Alaska Peninsula. Puale Bay was the most heavily oiled bay outside of Prince William Sound. In an effort to determine species presence, distribution, habitat use, and migratory patterns, extensive land bird studies were conducted from 1995 through 1998 at various locations around Becharof Lake. Biologists continued the monitoring work in the park 2001 through 2003 using the same methods, paying notable attention to seabird activity, along with caribou and Alaskan moose populations. The refuge is affiliated with the Alaska Fish and Wildlife Cooperative Research Unit at the University of Alaska Fairbanks to conduct research into the drainage basin east of the Ugashik Lakes on the Alaska Peninsula to monitor moose activity.

== Landscape and wildlife ==
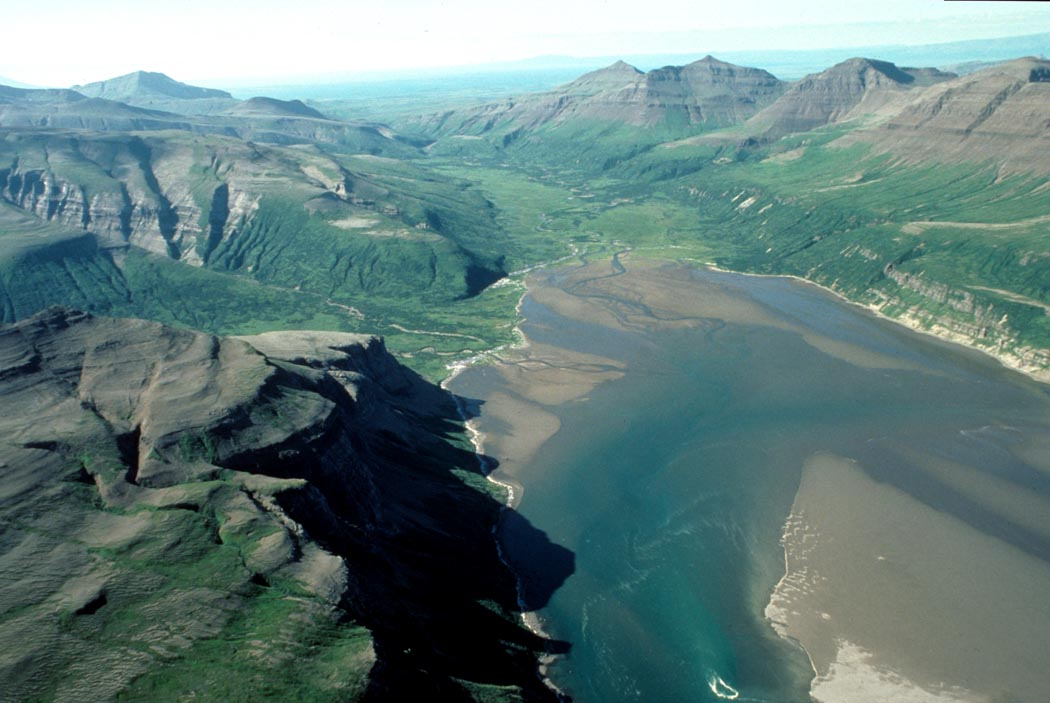
Dry Bay

The Becharof National Wildlife Refuge covers an area of 1,200,000 acres (4,900 km^{2}). It lies on a mountainous coastline containing the Ugashik-Peulik volcano and steep cliffs and the park contains a range of geographical features from mountains, broad valleys and fjords, to tundra and glacially formed lakes. Within the park lies the extensive Becharof Lake which at 300,000 acres (1,200 km^{2}), 35 miles (56 km) long, 15 miles (24 km) wide and 600 feet (180 m) deep at deepest, it is second largest lake in Alaska and the largest in the entire National Wildlife Refuge System. The lake is fed by a number of rivers and streams, and contains some of the largest salmon populations in the world. The lake has the world's second largest run of sockeye salmon and estimates reveal that Becharof Lake and its tributaries provide the Bristol Bay fishery alone with six million adult salmon per year. Wildlife is abundant in the park and the high levels of salmon are enough to feed the largest concentrations of brown bears in Alaska. Wolf packs, two species of fox, wolverine, river otter, beaver, caribou, seals, sea lions, sea otters and whales as well as various seabirds such as eagles found along the shore.

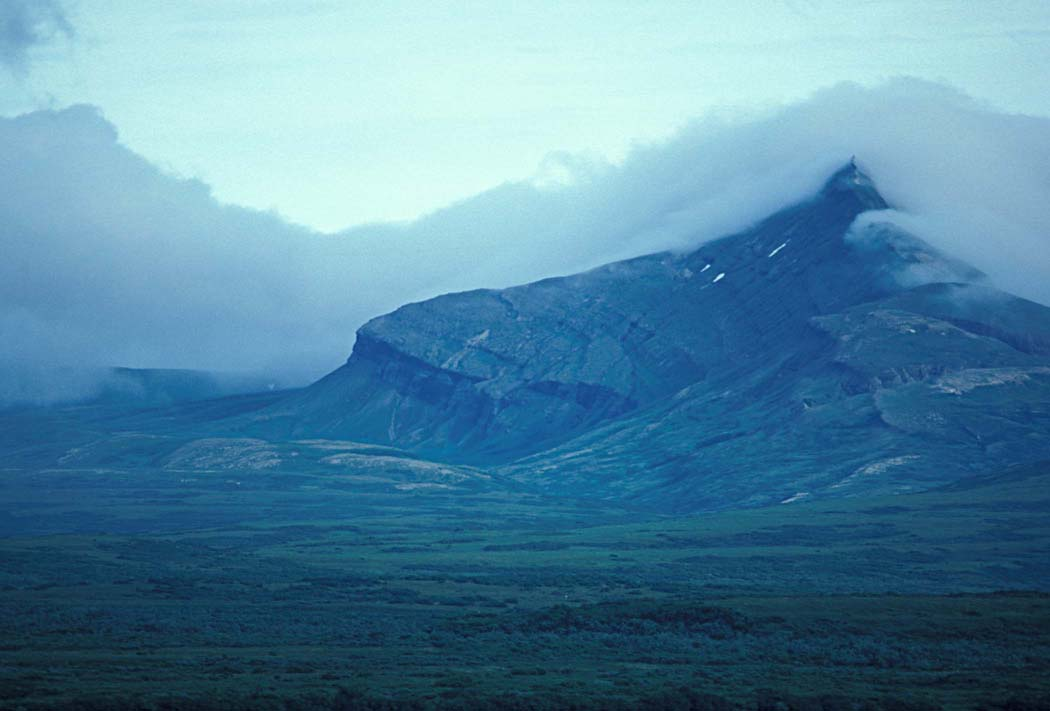
Refuge landscape

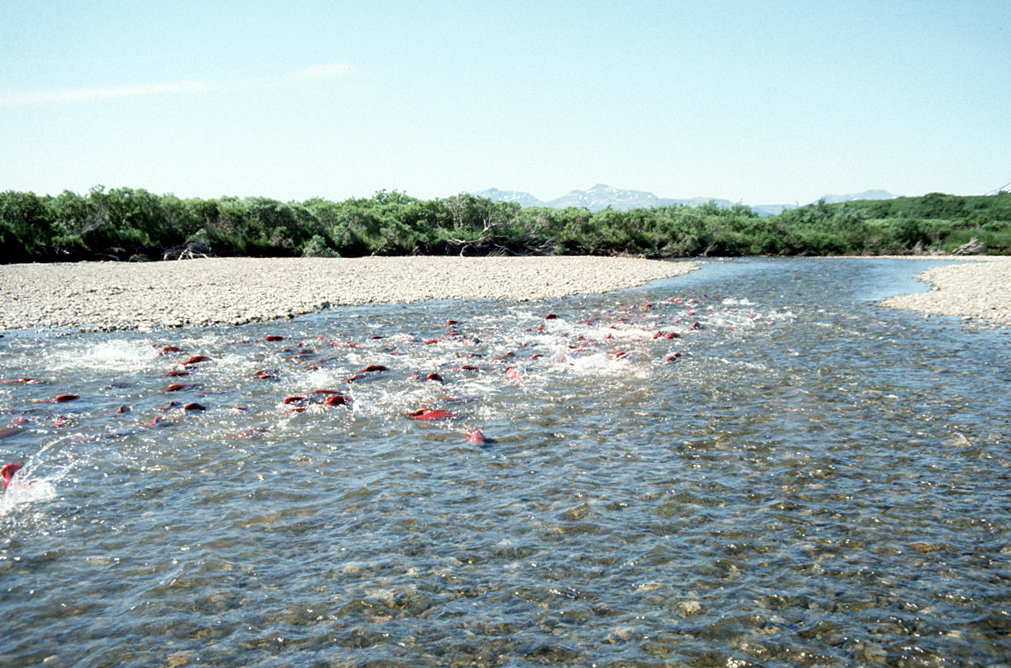
Spawning salmon in Becharof Creek

The Naknek River basin is one of the important wildlife habitats of the park. The river provides habitat for thousands of ducks, geese and swans that will later populate breeding lakes and ponds on the Alaska Peninsula and the area is closely monitored by biologists and ornithologists. The area contains notable populations of common merganser, common goldeneye, American green-winged teal, Canada goose, greater scaup, tundra swan, greater white-fronted goose, mallard, northern pintail, American and Eurasian wigeon, northern shoveler, red-breasted merganser, black scoter, and long-tailed duck. From mid-March through to mid-May, refuge biologists monitor waterfowl from established points that extend from the mouth of Naknek Lake to Kvichak Bay in Naknek and register the waterfowl by species approximately four times a week. During winter populations of red-breasted merganser, common goldeneye, bald eagle, willow ptarmigan, glaucous-winged gull, Canada jay, black-billed magpie, common raven, chickadee, northern shrike, and the common redpoll amongst other birds can be spotted in the park.
