= Egegik, Alaska =

City in Alaska, United States

Egegik, Alaska Igyagiiq, Igya'iq, Igyagiq
- City
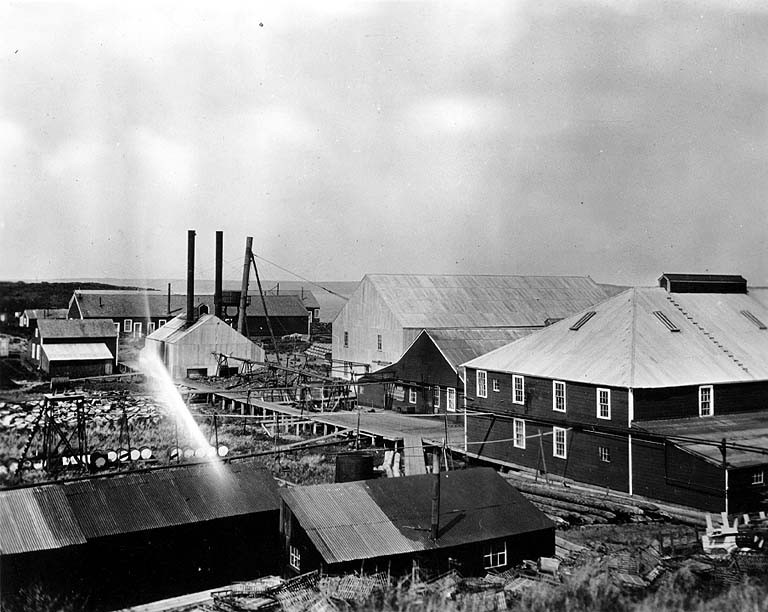
- Alaska Packers Association cannery at Egegik, 1917

- Location in Alaska
- Coordinates: 58°13′9″N 157°21′29″W
- Country: United States
- State: Alaska
- Borough: Lake and Peninsula
- Incorporated: 1995

Government
  - Mayor: Zachary Klein
  - State senator: Lyman Hoffman (D)
  - State rep.: Bryce Edgmon (I)

Area
  - Total: 128.50 sq mi (332.82 km^{2})
  - Land: 29.55 sq mi (76.54 km^{2})
  - Water: 98.95 sq mi (256.29 km^{2})
- Elevation: 13 ft (4 m)

Population (2020)
  - Total: 39
  - Density: 1.3/sq mi (0.51/km^{2})
- Time zone: UTC-9 (Alaska (AKST))
  - Summer (DST): UTC-8 (AKDT)
- ZIP code: 99579
- Area code: 907
- FIPS code: 02-21150
- GNIS feature ID: 1401686

Egegik (Central Yupik: Igyagiiq; Sugpiaq: Igya'iq, Igyagiq) is a city in Lake and Peninsula Borough, Alaska, United States. As of the 2020 census, the population of the city is 39, down from 109 in 2010. It has been home to cannery operations.

== Geography ==
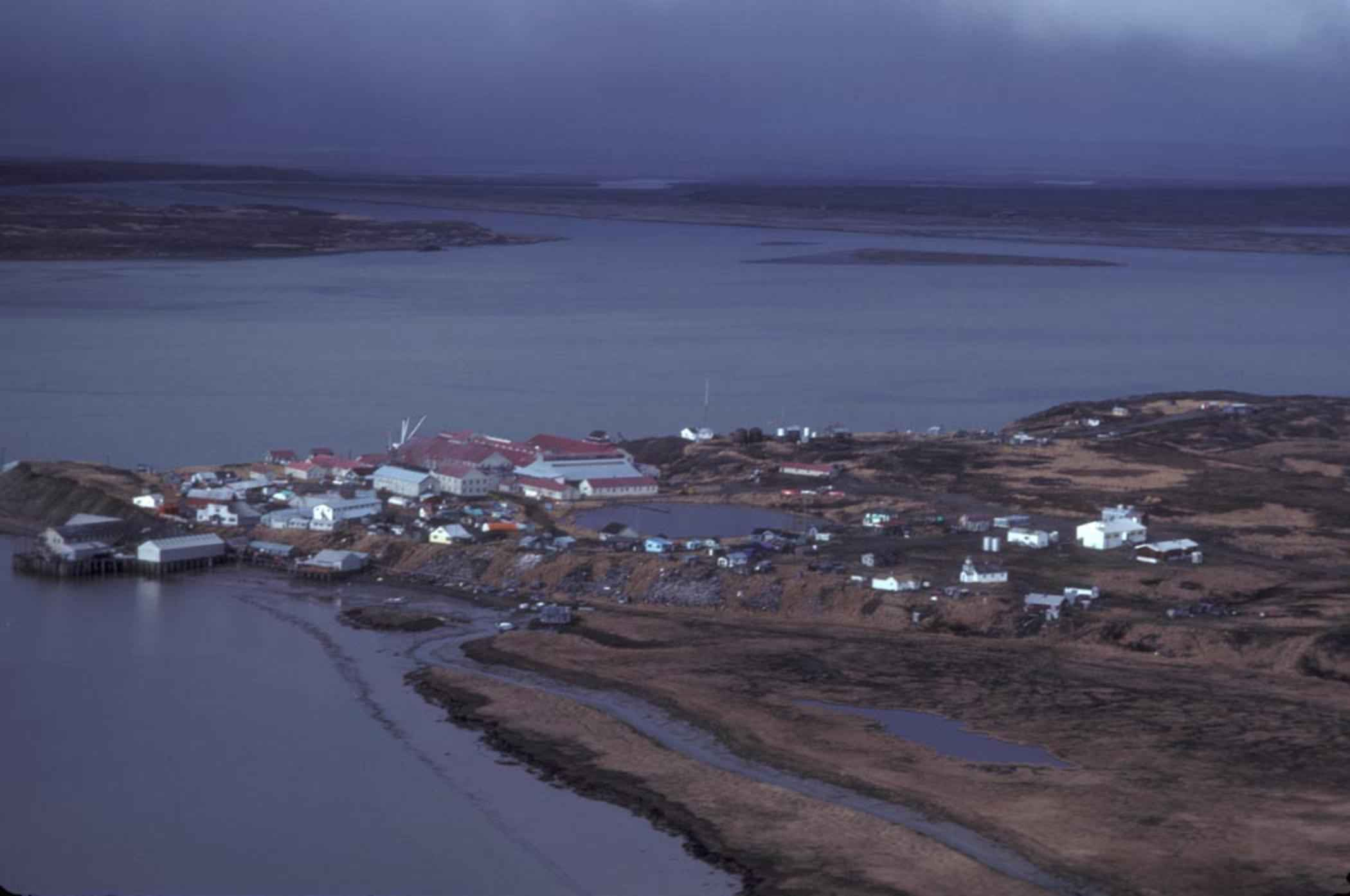

Egegik is at 58°13′9″N 157°21′29″W (58.219292, -157.357989) on the eastern shores of both Bristol Bay and, more locally, of Egegik Bay. The village is on a high bluff along the southern shore of the Egegik River at the upper extent of Egegik Bay.

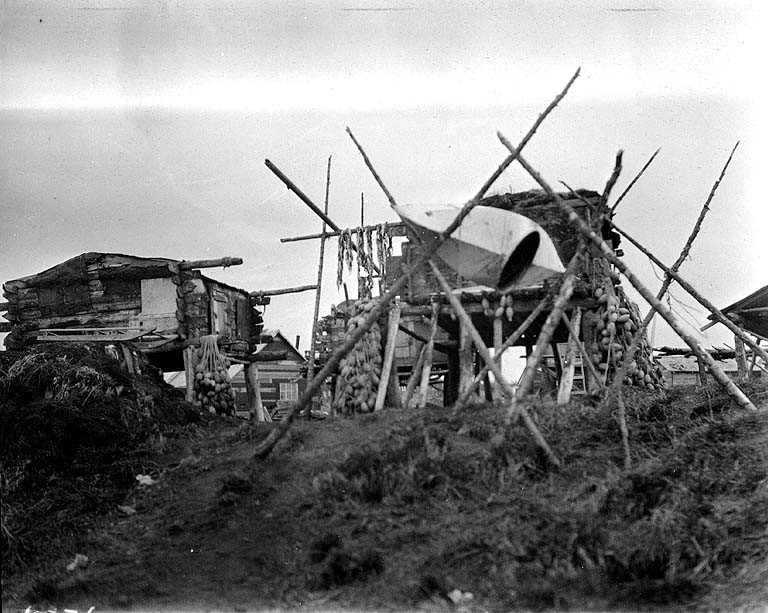
Dwellings of indigenous people on left and a bidarka (skin-overed kayak) on a rack to the right in Egegik, c. 1917

According to the United States Census Bureau, the city has an area of 134.0 square miles (347 km^{2}), of which, 32.8 square miles (85 km^{2}) is land and 101.2 square miles (262 km^{2}) (75.54%) is water.

== Demographics ==
Historical population
Census	Pop.	Note	%±
1880	120		—
1890	60		−50.0%
1900	203		238.3%
1920	83		—
1930	86		3.6%
1940	125		45.3%
1950	119		−4.8%
1960	150		26.1%
1970	148		−1.3%
1980	75		−49.3%
1990	122		62.7%
2000	116		−4.9%
2010	109		−6.0%
2020	39		−64.2%
U.S. Decennial Census

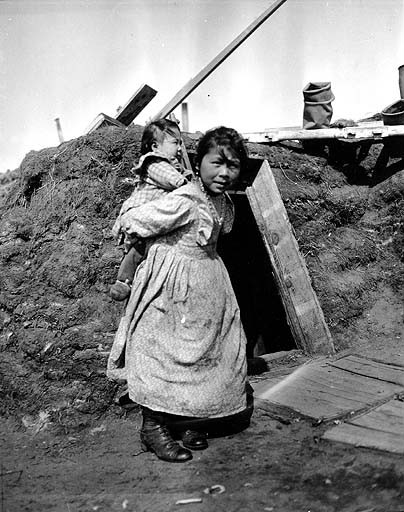
Children in Egegik, 1917

Egegik first appeared on the 1880 U.S. Census as the unincorporated Inuit village of Igagik. It appeared again under that name in 1890 and 1900. It returned again in 1920 as Egegik.

=== 2020 census ===
As of the 2020 census, Egegik had a population of 39. The median age was 43.5 years. 15.4% of residents were under the age of 18 and 15.4% of residents were 65 years of age or older. For every 100 females there were 105.3 males, and for every 100 females age 18 and over there were 106.2 males age 18 and over.

0.0% of residents lived in urban areas, while 100.0% lived in rural areas.

There were 24 households in Egegik, of which 25.0% had children under the age of 18 living in them. Of all households, 33.3% were married-couple households, 29.2% were households with a male householder and no spouse or partner present, and 16.7% were households with a female householder and no spouse or partner present. About 25.0% of all households were made up of individuals and 8.3% had someone living alone who was 65 years of age or older.

There were 243 housing units, of which 90.1% were vacant. The homeowner vacancy rate was 0.0% and the rental vacancy rate was 0.0%.

Racial composition as of the 2020 census
Race	Number	Percent
White	15	38.5%
Black or African American	0	0.0%
American Indian and Alaska Native	23	59.0%
Asian	0	0.0%
Native Hawaiian and Other Pacific Islander	0	0.0%
Some other race	0	0.0%
Two or more races	1	2.6%
Hispanic or Latino (of any race)	1	2.6%

=== 2000 census ===
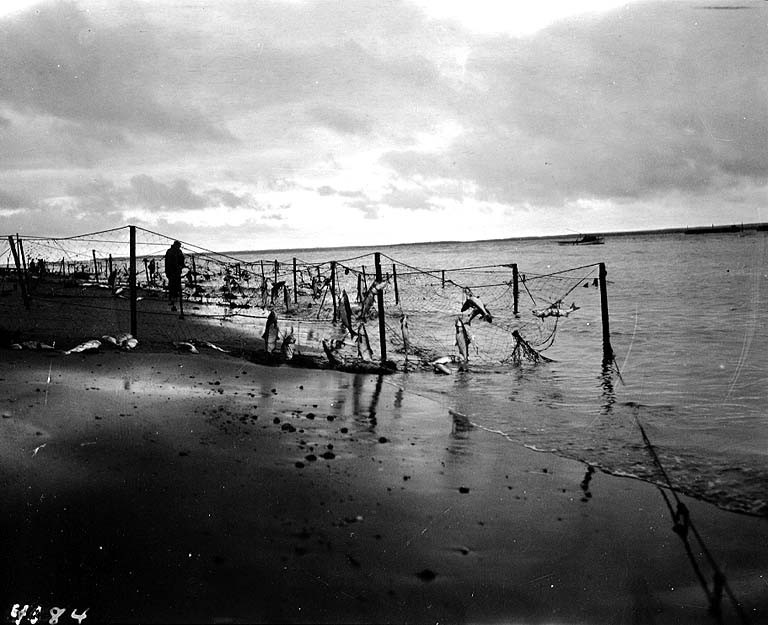
Native Alaskan fish traps at Egegik, 1917

As of the 2000 census, there were 64 people, 44 households, and 2 1/2 families residing in the city. The population density was 3.5 inhabitants per square mile (1.4/km^{2}). There were 286 housing units at an average density of 8.7 units per square mile (3.4 units/km^{2}). The racial makeup of the city was 18.97% White, 57.76% Native American, 0.86% Asian, and 22.41% from two or more races. 6.90% of the population were Hispanic or Latino of any race.

There were 44 households, out of which 29.5% had children under the age of 18 living with them, 36.4% were married couples living together, 2.3% had a female householder with no husband present, and 47.7% were non-families. 36.4% of all households were made up of individuals, and none had someone living alone who was 65 years of age or older. The average household size was 2.64 and the average family size was 3.74.

In the city, the age distribution of the population shows 32.8% under the age of 18, 7.8% from 18 to 24, 35.3% from 25 to 44, 20.7% from 45 to 64, and 3.4% who were 65 years of age or older. The median age was 35 years. For every 100 females, there were 146.8 males. For every 100 females age 18 and over, there were 116.7 males.

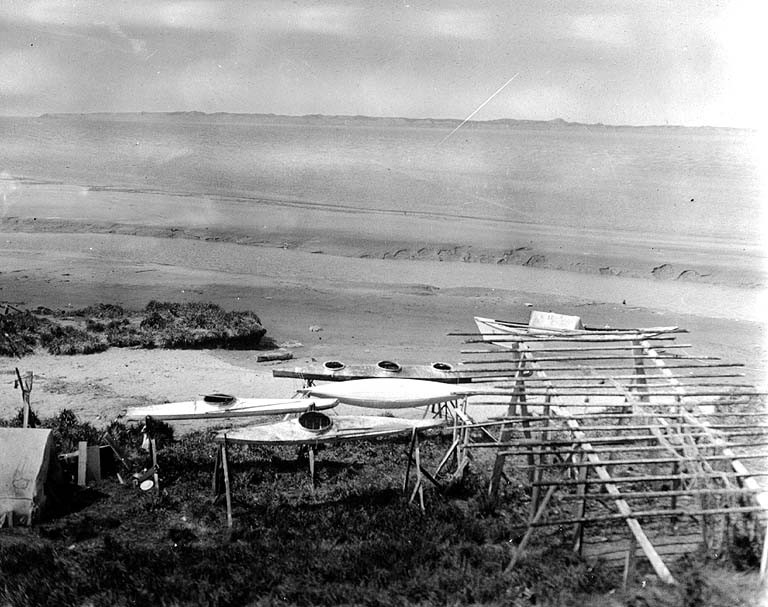
Bidarkas on the beach at Egegik, ca. 1917

The median income for a household in the city was $46,000, and the median income for a family was $59,583. Males had a median income of $39,375 versus $40,000 for females. The per capita income for the city was $16,352. There were no families and 6.9% of the population living below the poverty line, including no under eighteens and none of those over 64.
