= Bristol Bay =

Bay near southwest Alaska

Coordinates: 57°40′N 159°50′W

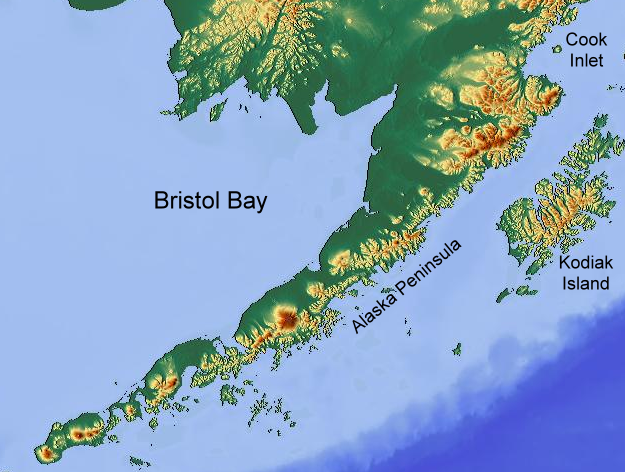
Map of Bristol Bay

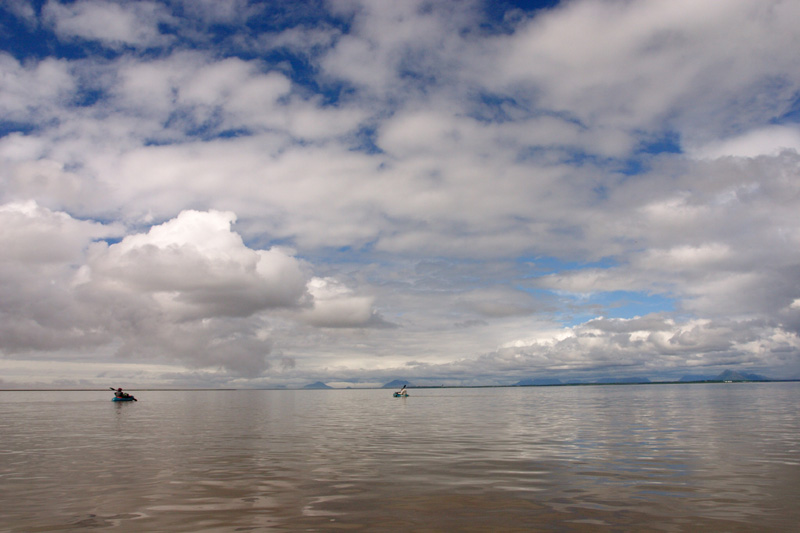
Packrafts on Nushagak Bay

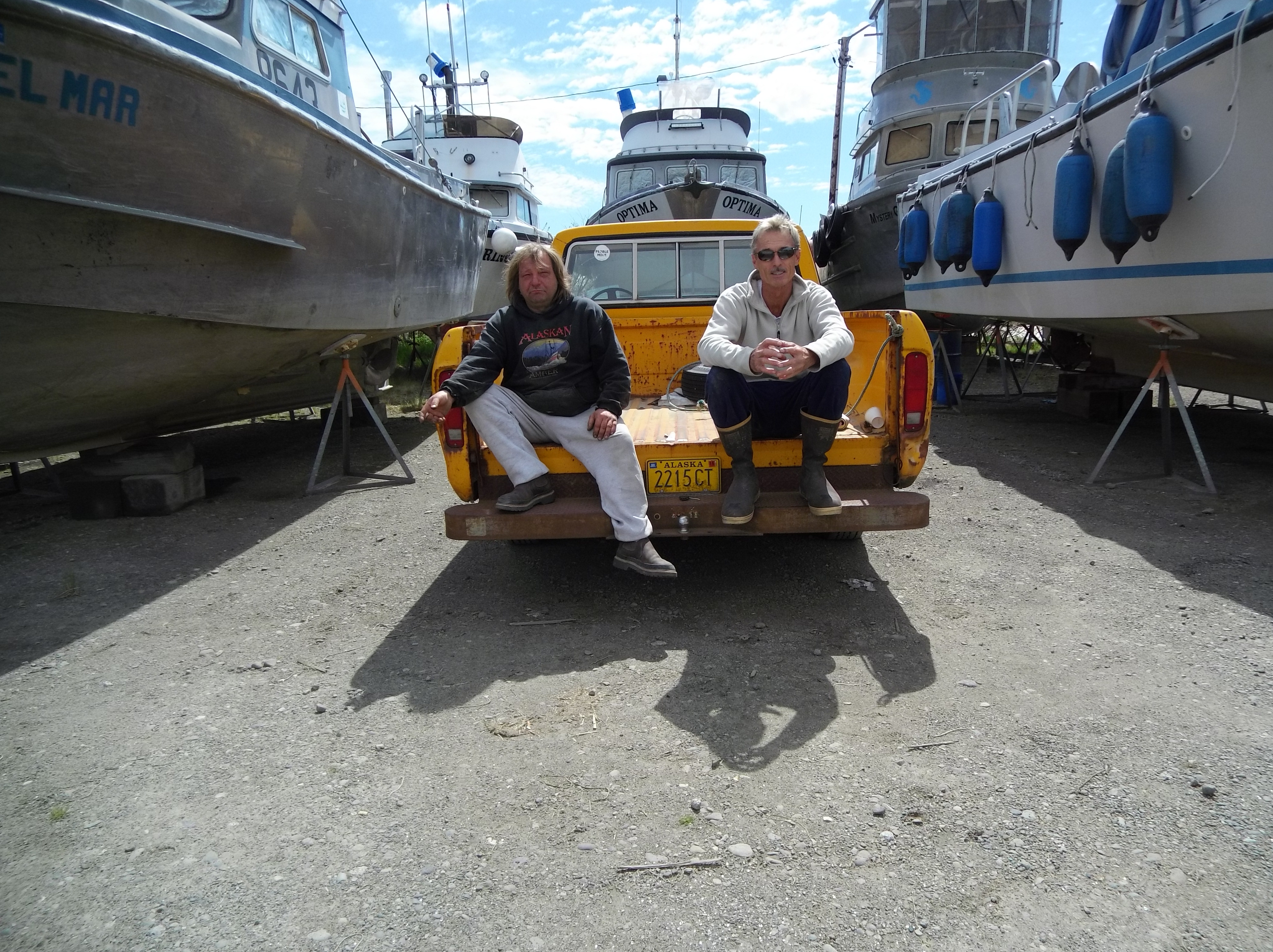
Bristol Bay fisherman

Bristol Bay (Central Yupik: Iilgayaq, Russian: Бристольский Залив) is the easternmost arm of the Bering Sea, at 57° to 59° North 157° to 162° West in Southwest Alaska. Bristol Bay is 400 km (250 mi) long and 290 km (180 mi) wide at its mouth. A number of rivers flow into the bay, including the Cinder, Egegik, Igushik, Kvichak, Meshik, Nushagak, Naknek, Togiak, and Ugashik.

Upper reaches of Bristol Bay experience some of the highest tides in the world. One such reach, the Nushagak Bay near Dillingham and another near Naknek in Kvichak Bay have tidal extremes in excess of 10 m (30 ft), ranking them — and the area — as eighth highest in the world. Coupled with the extreme number of shoals, sandbars, and shallows, it makes navigation troublesome, especially during the area's frequently strong winds. As the shallowest part of the Bering Sea, Bristol Bay is one of the most dangerous regions for large vessels.

== History ==
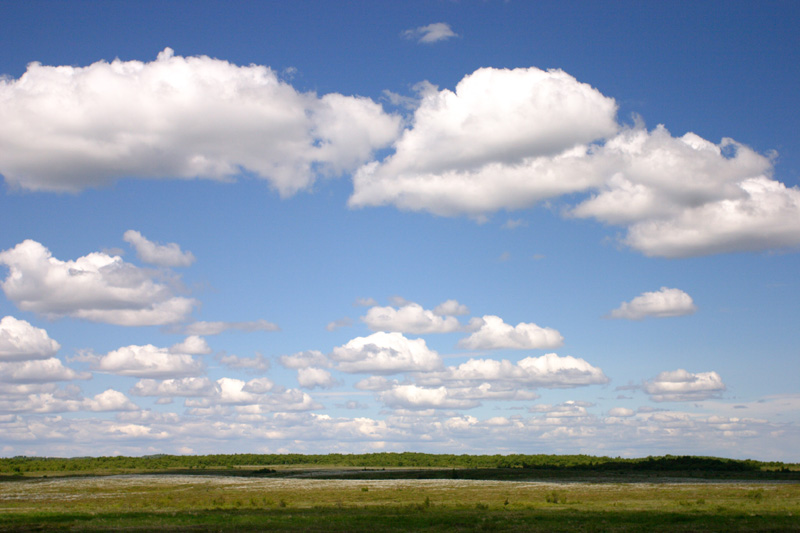
Tundra landscape near Bristol Bay

In ancient times, much of Bristol Bay was dry and arable, along with much of the Bering Sea Land Bridge. More recently, its proximity to mineral, animal and seafood riches provided an incentive for human habitation along its shoreline. Early Russian and English exploration provided most of the non-native influences of the area. During his voyage through the area in 1778, the famed British navigator and explorer Captain James Cook named the area "in honor of the Admiral Earl of Bristol" in England.

=== Early settlement ===
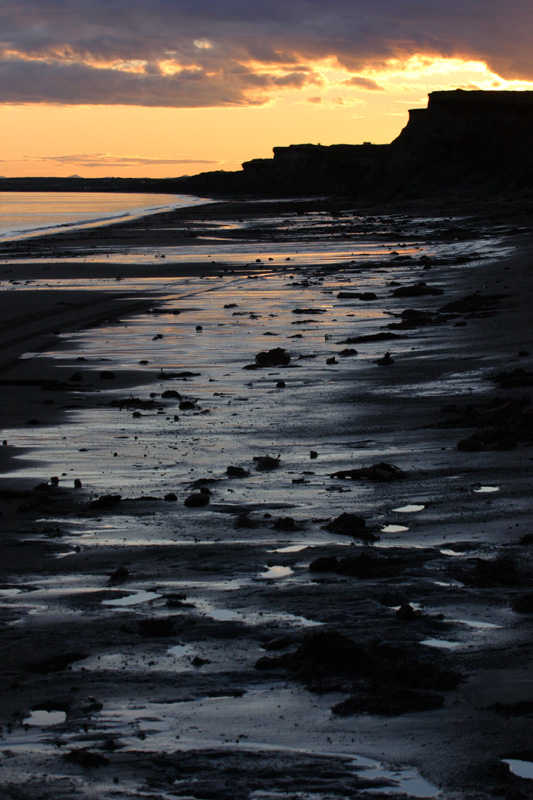
Shore of Bristol Bay

After establishing some temporary settlements in the late 1790s, The Russian American Company sent exploratory parties to document the coast and nearby inland areas of Bristol Bay. One of these charted the area between the Kuskokwim and Nushagak Rivers. The original Eskimo village at Naknek went through various names as recorded by the Russians after they arrived in the area in 1819 (1821-“Naugeik”; 1880- “Kinuyak”; and finally Naknek as named by Russian Navy Captain Tebenkov). Later, in 1819, an Aleut by the name of Andrei Ustiugov drew the first intensive charts of Bristol Bay. Additionally, ships of the Russian Navy conducted extensive surveys of the Bering Sea coastline into the mid-19th century, naming many of the geographical features commonly used today: Capes Constantine, Chichagof, Menshikof and Greig, Mounts Veniaminof and Pavlof, Becharof Lake, etc. In 1883 the first salmon cannery was open in Bristol Bay” (Source information from the cannery article to give context on the expansion of the salmon industry in Alaska and the history of growth.

The influence of the Katmai Volcano Explosion in 1912 and the influenza epidemic in 1919 decimated the Naknek people and area. According to oral history, there were only about three original families left at that time.

=== World War Two ===
On July 7, 1937, A plane chartered by the Alaska Fishermen's Union confirmed that large Japanese fishing vessels had entered the waters of Bristol Bay with four large fishing trawlers to harvest salmon. The ships, led by the Taiyo Maru, were spotted 28 miles (45 km) off shore, outside of the 3 miles (4.8 km) territorial waters limit. Pilot Jack Elliott dived out of cloud covert to with 50 feet (15 m) of boats, and affidavits and photographs were sent to the U.S. Department of State. There was no direct confrontation between the U.S. and Japanese fishers, and the four vessels left Bristol Bay on July 21.

At that time, the Fisheries Bureau prohibited the use of motorized vessels, fish traps, and purse seines in Alaska. This was to ensure a 50% escapement of the spawning salmon, to guarantee their sustainability.

The Japanese fleet was composed of diesel-powered steel vessels. The Japanese had a technological advantage over the American fisherman and dominated the bay that summer.

In 1938, the United States agreed with Japan that the Japanese would refrain from fishing in Alaskan waters. This agreement was honored until Japan and the United States entered World War 2. In the 1950s, Japan was strengthening its fishing presence in the Pacific; the US, Canada, and Japan passed the North Pacific Fisheries Treaty. This treaty managed the resources of the region jointly to preserve the future generations of fish. This agreement is the model for international fisheries regulations today.

== Industry ==
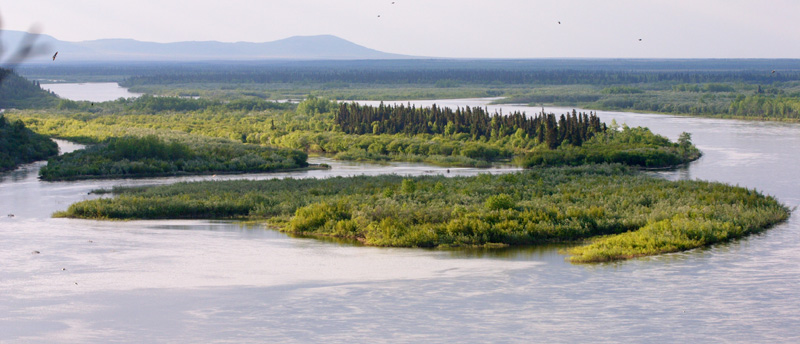
Nushagak River, draining into Bristol Bay

Bristol Bay is home to the world's most abundant Sockeye (red) salmon fishery as well as strong runs of Chum (dog) salmon, Coho (silver) salmon, Chinook (king) salmon, and Pink (humpy) salmon, each occurring seasonally. Chinook return to their freshwater spawning grounds earliest in the summer, followed by Sockeye and Chum. Coho and Pink salmon swim to their spawning grounds last, later in the summer. Fishing activity peaks for specific species during times of the highest concentration of salmon moving from the saltwater Pacific Ocean to the brackish Bristol Bay, then finally to their freshwater natal spawning streams at the headwaters of the many lakes and rivers in the Bristol Bay watershed.

On an international scale, Sockeye salmon are a relatively rare creature. Like other wild salmon species, Sockeye harvests fluctuate but comprise 4 to 7 percent of global salmon production and 13 to 20 percent of wild salmon harvests. Between 2011 and 2014, Sockeye salmon accounted for 5 percent of the world's salmon harvest by volume and 15 percent of the world's wild salmon harvest.

=== Commercial fishing ===
Bristol Bay is home to the world's largest salmon run. All five Eastern Pacific species spawn in the bay's freshwater tributaries. Commercial fisheries include the world's largest Sockeye salmon fishery. The Kvijack drains from Lake Iliamna. Along with herring and other fisheries, salmon fishing accounts for nearly 75% of local jobs.

During the first 50 years of commercial salmon fishing in Bristol Bay, the fishing boats were restricted to sail power. When this restriction lifted in 1951, it took only seven short years to outfit all the boats (approximately 1,500) with diesel or gas engines. In the late 1920s another law was passed restricting the length of the boats to 32 feet. This law holds true even today.

=== Canneries ===
Bristol Bay is a remote part of Alaska. The canneries preserve the freshness of the salmon which are gutted, cleaned, and processed on site. These companies have established a presence in Bristol Bay.

Canneries include North Pacific Seafoods, Togiak Seafoods, Bristol Bay Setnet, Friedman Family Fisheries, Peter Pan Seafoods, Ekuk Fisheries, Big Creek Shore plant, Coffee Point Seafood, Icicle Seafoods, Wild Premium Salmon, Seafood Enterprises of Alaska, Alaska General Seafoods, Alaska Salmon Wild, Da Kine Enterprise, Extreme Salmon, Great Ruby Fish, My Girl, Naknek Family Fisheries, North Pacific Seafoods, Ocean Beauty, Silver Bay Seafoods, Trident Seafoods, Tulchina Fisheries, Diamond Lodge Smokehouse, and Nakeen Homepack.

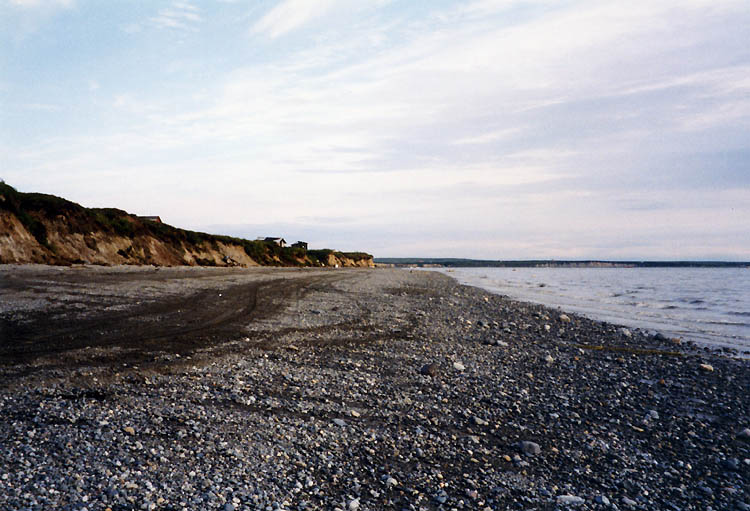
Shore of Bristol Bay near Naknek

Major industries are commercial fishing and the associated canneries, sport fishing, hunting and tourism. The number of business lodges, hunting- and fishing-resorts and visitors to the nearby Katmai National Park and Preserve has grown exponentially in recent years. Sports fishing is another important local industry. Many lodges cater to sport fishermen targeting the salmon and trout populations in the freshwater tributaries. Freshwater species include humpback whitefish (Coregonus pidschianpp), Dolly Varden trout (Salvelinus malma), and Rainbow trout (Oncorhynchus mykiss).[18]

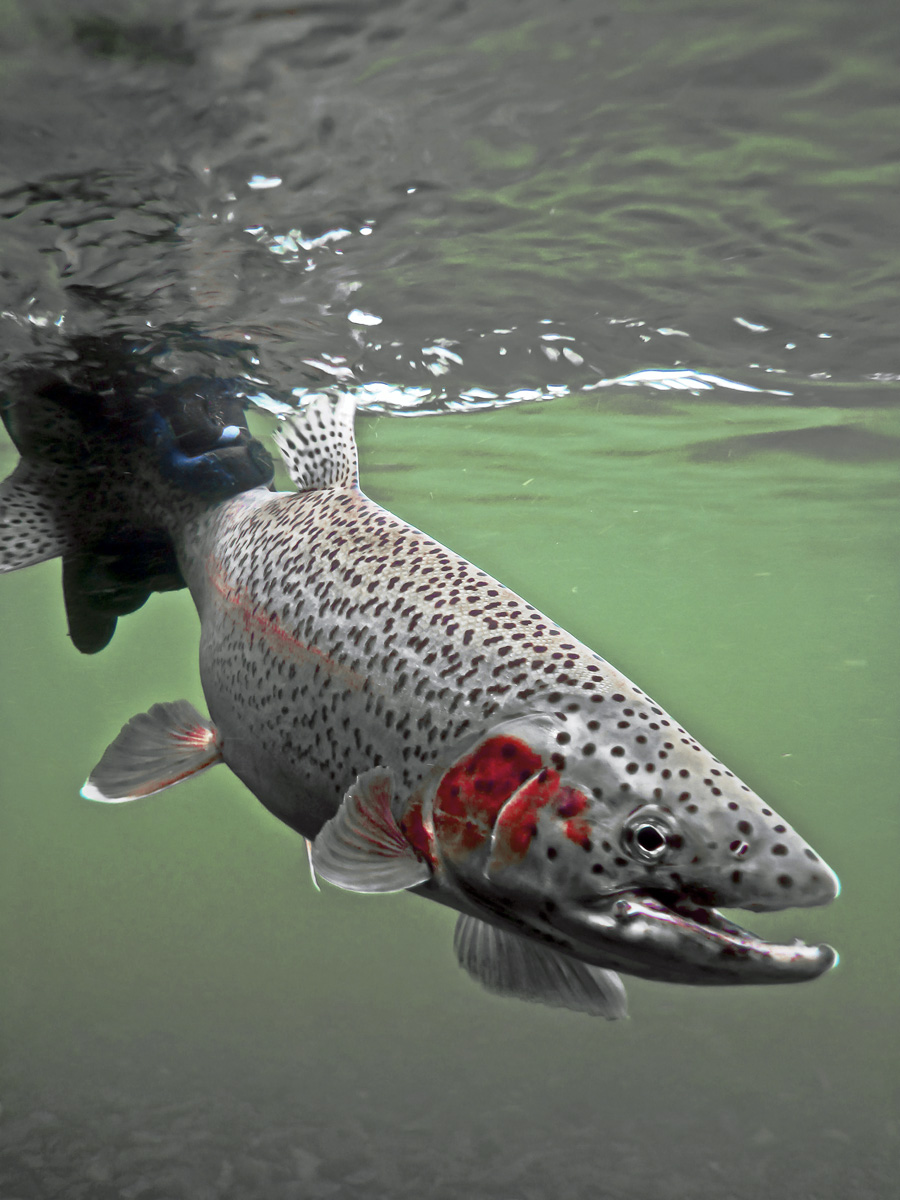
Leopard rainbow trout Bristol Bay Alaska

The area has also experienced significant interest in oil and mineral development, most notably with the proposed Pebble Mine on the north shore of Iliamna Lake, and auctioning of leases to tracts in the southern Bristol Bay area known as the North Aleutians Basin, an area which has been closed to offshore oil and gas development since a moratorium in 1998. The draft plan by the Bureau of Land Management (pending public comments until 2/5/2007), also proposes to open most of the BLM's 3,600,000 acres (1,500,000 ha) in the area to hard rock mining and oil and gas drilling.

== Demographics ==
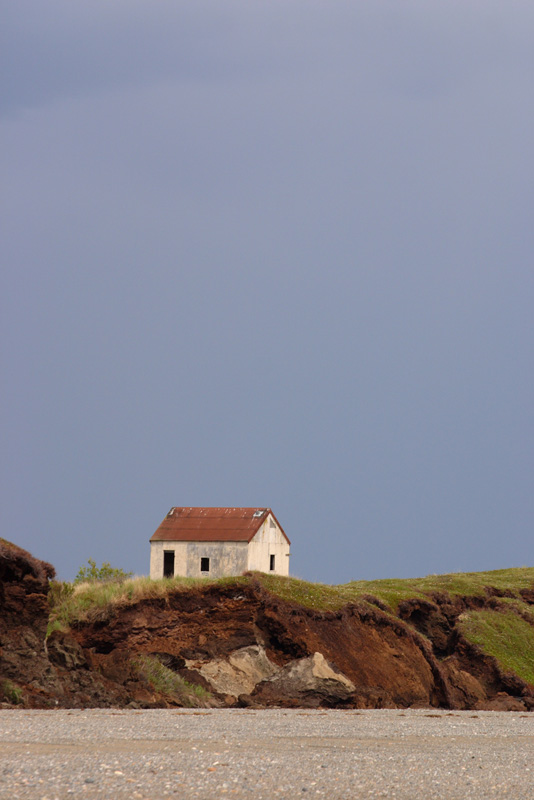
Abandoned cabin on Bristol Bay

The largest community in the Bristol Bay area is Dillingham. Many other communities dot the coastline and rivers of Bristol Bay, including:

- Aleknagik
- Chignik
- Chignik Lagoon
- Chignik Lake
- Clark's Point
- Egegik /ˈɪɡɛɡɪk/
- Ekuk /ˈɛkoʊk/
- Ekwok
- Igiugig /ˈɛdʒiːˈjɔːɡɪɡ/
- Iliamna
- Ivanof Bay
- King Salmon
- Kokhanok
- Koliganek
- Levelock
- Manokotak /mɑːnəˈkoʊtɑːk/
- Naknek
- New Stuyahok /ˈstuːjəhɒk/
- Newhalen
- Nondalton
- Pedro Bay
- Perryville
- Pilot Point
- Pope-Vannoy Landing
- Port Alsworth
- Port Heiden
- Portage Creek
- South Naknek
- Togiak
- Twin Hills
- Ugashik (/juːˈɡæʃɪk/

All of these communities are primarily inhabited by Alaska Natives, except for Dillingham and King Salmon; the former being influenced early-on by salmon-cannery employees from around the world including European and Asian people. King Salmon was populated by military personnel stationed, primarily during Cold War years, at the King Salmon Air Force Station, and later by visitors and employees of the nearby Katmai National Park and Preserve.

== Proposed Pebble Mine ==
A mineral exploration project investigating a large porphyry copper, gold, and molybdenum deposit in the Bristol Bay region has been proposed and may be undertaken by British-Australian Rio Tinto and Japanese conglomerate Mitsubishi. Northern Dynasty Minerals LLC staked a claim on the site in 2001 and with its partners, invested 500 million dollars into the project. The mining company lost all of its partners in 2011 due to increasing government regulations and distrust by its partners.

Because of the estimated 10 billion tons of mining waste that must be permanently stored in the area, which is an active earthquake zone, and Rio Tinto's environmental track record, which is seen as poor by many environmental advocacy groups, fears have been raised about the potential impact on the Bristol Bay area and its wildlife and residents. In April 2003, the U.S. Environmental Protection Agency issued an assessment of the impact of the proposed mining operations on fisheries, wildlife, and native Alaska tribes. Between 2014 and May 2017, Pebble sued the EPA several times. The company argued the EPA unfairly assumed the scope of the mine before it formally filed mining plans. Northern Dynasty Minerals LLC. accused the government agency of colluding with anti-mine activists to reach its conclusions.

In July 2019, the EPA withdrew their preemptive proposed determination to restrict use of the pebble deposit area as a disposal site. In September 2020, while posing as potential investors in the mine an environmental activist group secretly taped conversations with Ronald Thiessen, chief executive of Northern Dynasty Minerals, and Tom Collier, chief executive of Pebble Limited Partnership. During the conversations Collier and Thiessen detailed their plans to gain the favor of elected politicians from Juneau to Washington, D.C. to gain a favorable outcome for the approval of the mining operation. The conversations also revealed that while the company is seeking a 20 year permit, Thiessen outlined how it could last another 160 years.

After more than two decades of opposition by a majority of Bristol Bay residents and Tribes, the Environmental Protection Agency (EPA) used its authority under the Clean Water Act 404(c) to stop the proposed Pebble Mine project. The EPA released a Final Determination which declared that after extensive scientific and technical research and robust stakeholder engagement that the Pebble Mine would have unacceptable adverse affects to salmon fishery areas in the Bristol Bay watershed.

== See also ==
- Bristol Bay Borough
- Lake and Peninsula Borough
- Dillingham Census Area
