= List of places in Alaska (I) =

This list of cities, towns, unincorporated communities, counties, and other recognized places in the U.S. state of Alaska also includes information on the number and names of counties in which the place lies, and its lower and upper zip code bounds, if applicable.

Name of place	Number of counties	Principal county	Lower zip code	Upper zip code
Icy Bay	1	Valdez-Cordova Census Area		
Iditarod	1	Yukon-Koyukuk Census Area		
Iditarod Area Regional Educational Attendance Area	2	Bethel Census Area		
Iditarod Area Regional Educational Attendance Area	2	Yukon-Koyukuk Census Area		
Igiak	1	Kusilvak Census Area		
Igiugig	1	Lake and Peninsula Borough	99613	
Igloo	1	Nome Census Area		
Igushik	1	Dillingham Census Area		
Ikatan	1	Aleutians East Borough	99583	
Iliamna	1	Lake and Peninsula Borough	99606	
Iliamna Airport	1	Lake and Peninsula Borough	99606	
Inalik	1	Nome Census Area		
Indian	1	Municipality of Anchorage	99540	
Indian Mountain	1	Yukon-Koyukuk Census Area	99745	
Indian Village	1	Southeast Fairbanks Census Area		
Inger	1	Bethel Census Area		
Ingrihak	1	Kusilvak Census Area		
Iniskin	1	Kenai Peninsula Borough		
Iron Creek	1	Nome Census Area		
Island Homes	1	Fairbanks North Star Borough	99701	
Itulilik	1	Bethel Census Area		
Ivanof Bay	1	Lake and Peninsula Borough	99502	
