= Iliamna =

Iliamna can refer to:

== Places in the United States ==
- Iliamna, Alaska, a census-designated place
- Iliamna Bay on the Kenai Peninsula, Alaska
- Iliamna Lake in Alaska
- Iliamna River in Alaska
- Iliamna Volcano in Alaska
- Iliamna Airport in Iliamna, Alaska.

== Other uses ==
- Iliamna (plant), a genus of mallow

== See also ==
- Lilamna, an extinct genus of sharks
