= List of places in Alaska (P) =

This list of cities, towns, unincorporated communities, counties, and other recognized places in the U.S. state of Alaska also includes information on the number and names of counties in which the place lies, and its lower and upper zip code bounds, if applicable.

Name of place	Number of counties	Principal county	Lower zip code	Upper zip code
Paimiut	1	Kusilvak Census Area		
Palmer	1	Matanuska-Susitna Borough	99645	
Paradise	1	Yukon-Koyukuk Census Area		
Parks	1	Kodiak Island Borough		
Pasagshak	1	Kodiak Island Borough		
Pauloff Harbor	1	Aleutians East Borough		
Paxson	1	Valdez-Cordova Census Area	99737	
Paylof Harbor	1	Aleutians East Borough		
Pedro Bay	1	Lake and Peninsula Borough	99647	
Pedro Dome	1	Fairbanks North Star Borough		
Pelican	1	Skagway-Hoonah-Angoon Census Area	99832	
Pelican City School District	1	Skagway-Hoonah-Angoon Census Area		
Peninsula Point	1	Ketchikan Gateway Borough	99901	
Pennock Island	1	Ketchikan Gateway Borough	99901	
Perkinsville	1	Nome Census Area		
Perryville	1	Lake and Peninsula Borough	99648	
Petersburg	1	Wrangell-Petersburg Census Area	99833	
Petersburg	1	Wrangell-Petersburg Census Area		
Petersburg Airport	1	Wrangell-Petersburg Census Area	99929	
Petersburg City School District	1	Wrangell-Petersburg Census Area		
Peters Creek	1	Municipality of Anchorage	99567	
Peters Creek North	1	Matanuska-Susitna Borough		
Petersville	1	Matanuska-Susitna Borough		
Phonograph	1	Skagway-Hoonah-Angoon Census Area		
Pikmiktalik	1	Kusilvak Census Area		
Pilgrim Springs	1	Nome Census Area		
Pilot	1	Kusilvak Census Area		
Pilot Point	1	Lake and Peninsula Borough	99649	
Pilot Station	1	Kusilvak Census Area	99650	
Pilot Station Traditional Council	1	Kusilvak Census Area		
Pitkas Point	1	Kusilvak Census Area	99658	
Pitka's Point	1	Kusilvak Census Area	99658	
Pittman	1	Matanuska-Susitna Borough		
Platinum	1	Bethel Census Area	99651	
Pleasant Valley	1	Fairbanks North Star Borough		
Point Baker	1	Prince of Wales-Outer Census Area	99927	
Point Barrow Station	1	North Slope Borough	99723	
Point Higgins	1	Ketchikan Gateway Borough		
Point Hope	1	North Slope Borough	99766	
Point Lay	1	North Slope Borough	99759	
Point McIntyre	1	North Slope Borough		
Point MacKenzie	1	Matanuska-Susitna Borough		
Point Retreat	1	Skagway-Hoonah-Angoon Census Area		
Point Storkersen	1	North Slope Borough		
Point Whitshed	1	Valdez-Cordova Census Area		
Polk Inlet	1	Prince of Wales-Outer Census Area		
Poorman	1	Yukon-Koyukuk Census Area		
Pope-Vannoy Landing	1	Lake and Peninsula Borough		
Portage	1	Municipality of Anchorage		
Portage Creek	1	Dillingham Census Area		
Portage Creek	1	Dillingham Census Area	99576	
Portage Junction	1	Municipality of Anchorage		
Port Alexander	2	City and Borough of Sitka	99836	
Port Alexander	2	Wrangell-Petersburg Census Area	99836	
Port Alice	1	Prince of Wales-Outer Census Area		
Port Alsworth	1	Lake and Peninsula Borough	99653	
Port Armstrong	1	City and Borough of Sitka		
Port Ashton	1	Valdez-Cordova Census Area	99574	
Port Bailey	1	Kodiak Island Borough	99697	
Port Chilkoot	1	Haines Borough		
Port Clarence	1	Nome Census Area	99762	
Port Frederick	1	Skagway-Hoonah-Angoon Census Area		
Port Graham	1	Kenai Peninsula Borough	99603	
Port Heiden	1	Lake and Peninsula Borough	99549	
Port Heiden Airport	1	Lake and Peninsula Borough	99549	
Port Higgins	1	Ketchikan Gateway Borough	99901	
Port Hobron	1	Kodiak Island Borough		
Port Lions	1	Kodiak Island Borough	99550	
Portlock	1	Kenai Peninsula Borough		
Port Moller	1	Aleutians East Borough	99695	
Port Nellie Juan	1	Valdez-Cordova Census Area		
Port Nikiski	1	Kenai Peninsula Borough		
Port O'Brien	1	Kodiak Island Borough		
Port Protection	1	Prince of Wales-Outer Census Area		
Port Safety	1	Nome Census Area		
Port Wakefield	1	Kodiak Island Borough		
Port William	1	Kodiak Island Borough	99697	
Potter	1	Municipality of Anchorage		
Pounrevik	1	Kusilvak Census Area	99666	
Pribilof Island Regional Educational Attendance Area	1	Aleutians West Census Area		
Primrose	1	Kenai Peninsula Borough		
Prince of Wales	1	Prince of Wales-Outer Census Area		
Prince William Sound	1	Valdez-Cordova Census Area		
Prudhoe Bay	1	North Slope Borough	99734	
Prudhoe Bay-Kaktovik	1	North Slope Borough		
Ptarmigan	1	Valdez-Cordova Census Area		
