= Iliamna Bay =

Bay in Kenai Peninsula Borough, Alaska, United States

Coordinates: 59.64°N 153.60°W

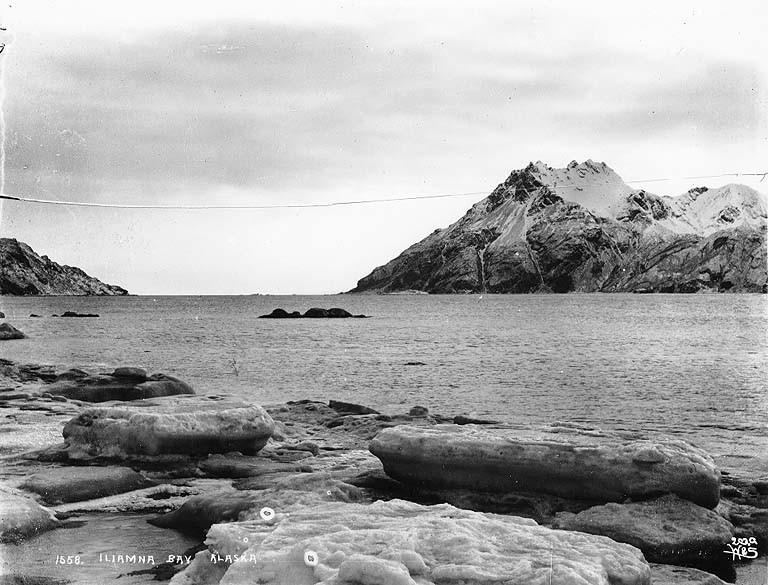
Photograph of ice floes on Iliamna Bay, 1902, by Eric A. Hegg

Iliamna Bay is a bay along the southeastern coast of the Alaska Peninsula. It is below the Chigmit Mountains. Old Iliamna is miles away and the Iliamna River are north of it. Cottonwood Bay borders it to the west and Cook Inlet to the south. Augustine Volcano, an island, is south of it.

Despite its name it is not located on Iliamna Lake or the Iliamna River; but it is the closest point on the Gulf of Alaska to the lake. A 15-mile (24 km) road connects the bay at Williamsport, Alaska, to Iliamna Lake. Boaters can be towed up it then navigate across the lake and down the Kvichak River to Bristol Bay in order to avoid a much longer trip around the Alaska Peninsula.
