= 2012 United States presidential election in Alaska =

- November 6, 2012

Nominee	Mitt Romney	Barack Obama
Party	Republican	Democratic
Home state	Massachusetts	Illinois
Running mate	Paul Ryan	Joe Biden
Electoral vote	3	0
Popular vote	164,676	122,640
Percentage	54.80%	40.81%

Romney
40–50%
50–60%
60–70%
70–80%
Obama
40–50%
50–60%
60–70%
70–80%
President before election
Barack Obama
Democratic
Elected President
Barack Obama
Democratic

The 2012 United States presidential election in Alaska took place on November 6, 2012, as part of the 2012 United States presidential election in which all 50 states plus the District of Columbia participated. Alaska voters chose three electors to represent them in the Electoral College via a popular vote pitting incumbent Democratic President Barack Obama and his running mate, Vice President Joe Biden, against Republican challenger and former Massachusetts Governor Mitt Romney and his running mate, Congressman Paul Ryan.

Prior to the election, all leading news organizations considered this a state Romney would win, making Alaska a safe red state. Romney won the state of Alaska with 54.80% of the vote, while Obama received 40.81%. This was the first time since 1968 that a Democrat received more than 40% of the vote in Alaska. No Democrat has won Alaska since it was won by Lyndon B. Johnson in 1964.

Although Romney easily won its three electoral votes, it was one of six states (Note: The other states are Louisiana, Maryland, Mississippi, New Jersey, and New York.) to swing toward Obama relative to 2008, when Alaska was won with a 21.5% margin of victory by Republican nominee John McCain running with the incumbent governor of Alaska, Sarah Palin, as his vice-presidential candidate. Obama closed his margin of defeat by 7.55% compared to his 2008 loss, thereby making it the state with the strongest Democratic gain in 2012.

Obama also flipped seven boroughs and census areas that he had lost in 2008. As of the 2024 election, this is the last election in which Haines Borough voted for the Republican candidate.

== Caucuses ==
=== Democratic caucuses ===
The Alaska Democratic caucuses were held from April 10 to 14, 2012, with the state party convention being held from May 11 to 13. Precincts within House Districts combined to hold caucuses to pledge delegates to the State Convention. Obama ran mostly unopposed (with the exception of Randall Terry, who was on the ballot but received no votes) and consequently received all of the 500 popular votes and 24 delegates.

2012 Alaska Democratic presidential caucuses
- April 14, 2012

24 Democratic National Convention delegates (19 pledged, 5 unpledged) The number of pledged delegates won is determined by the popular vote

Candidate	Barack Obama	Uncommitted
Home state	Illinois	N/A
Delegate count	19	0
Popular vote	500	0
Percentage	100.00%	0.00%

=== Republican caucuses ===
2012 United States presidential caucuses in Alaska (Republican Party)
- March 6, 2012

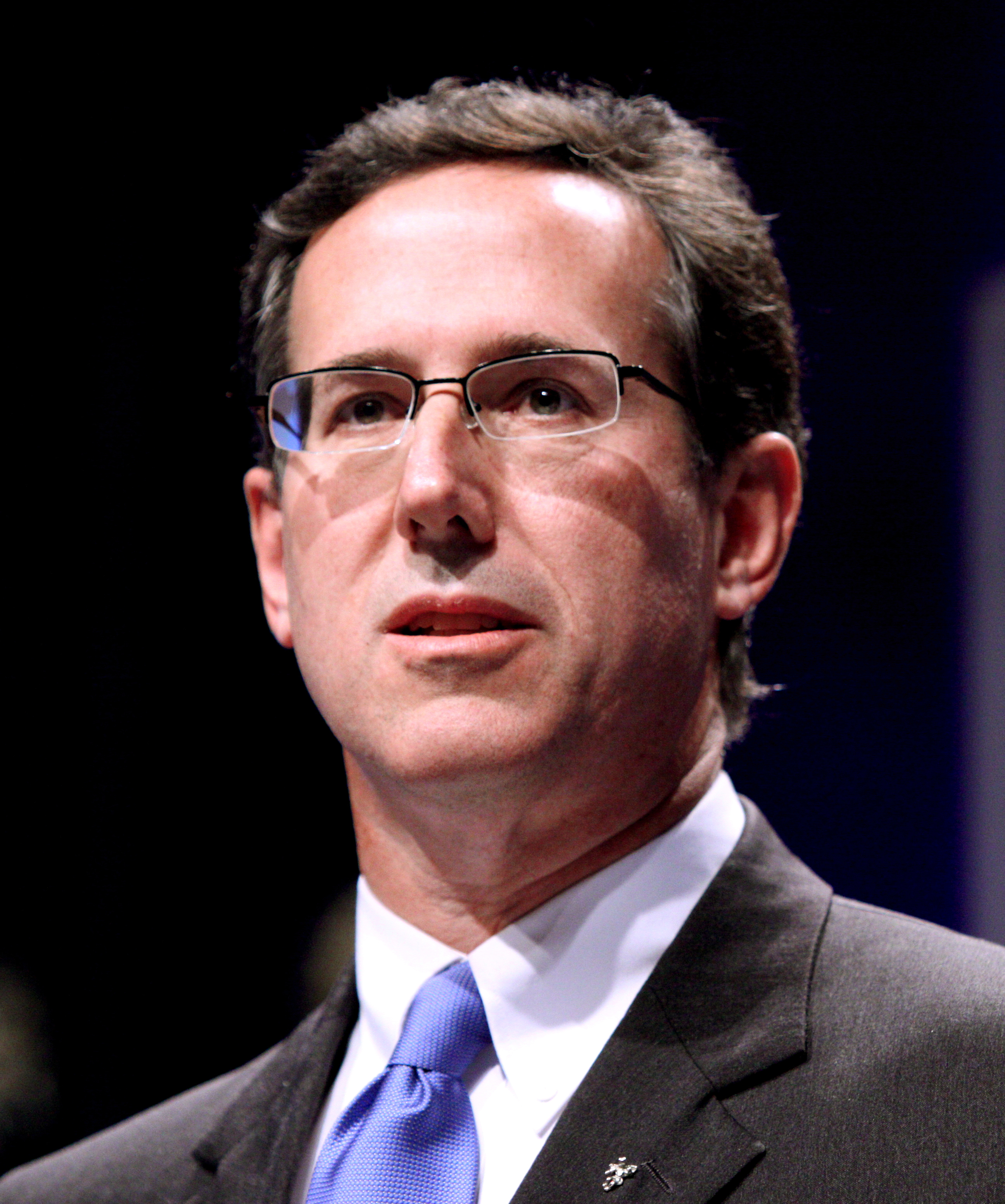

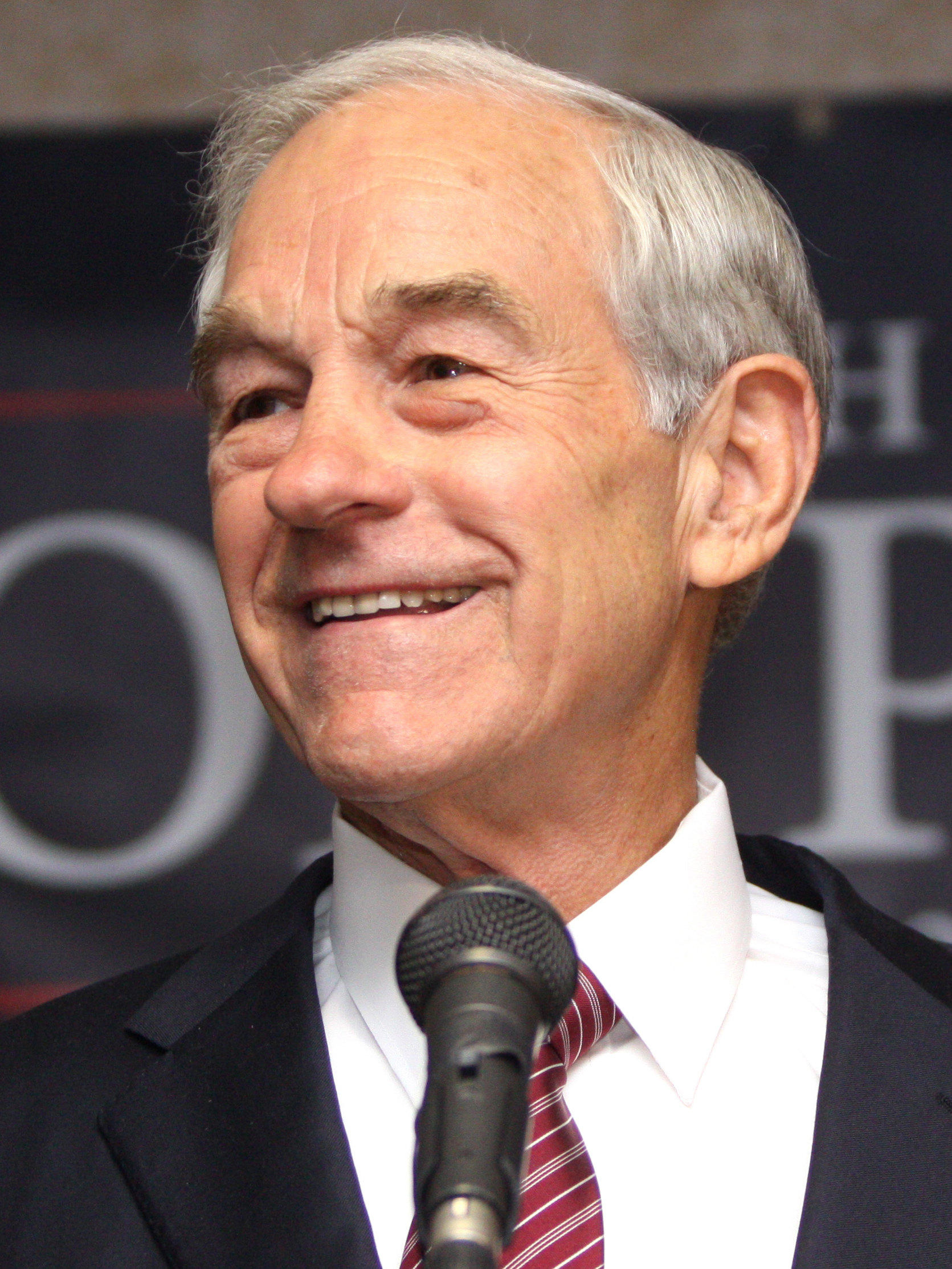

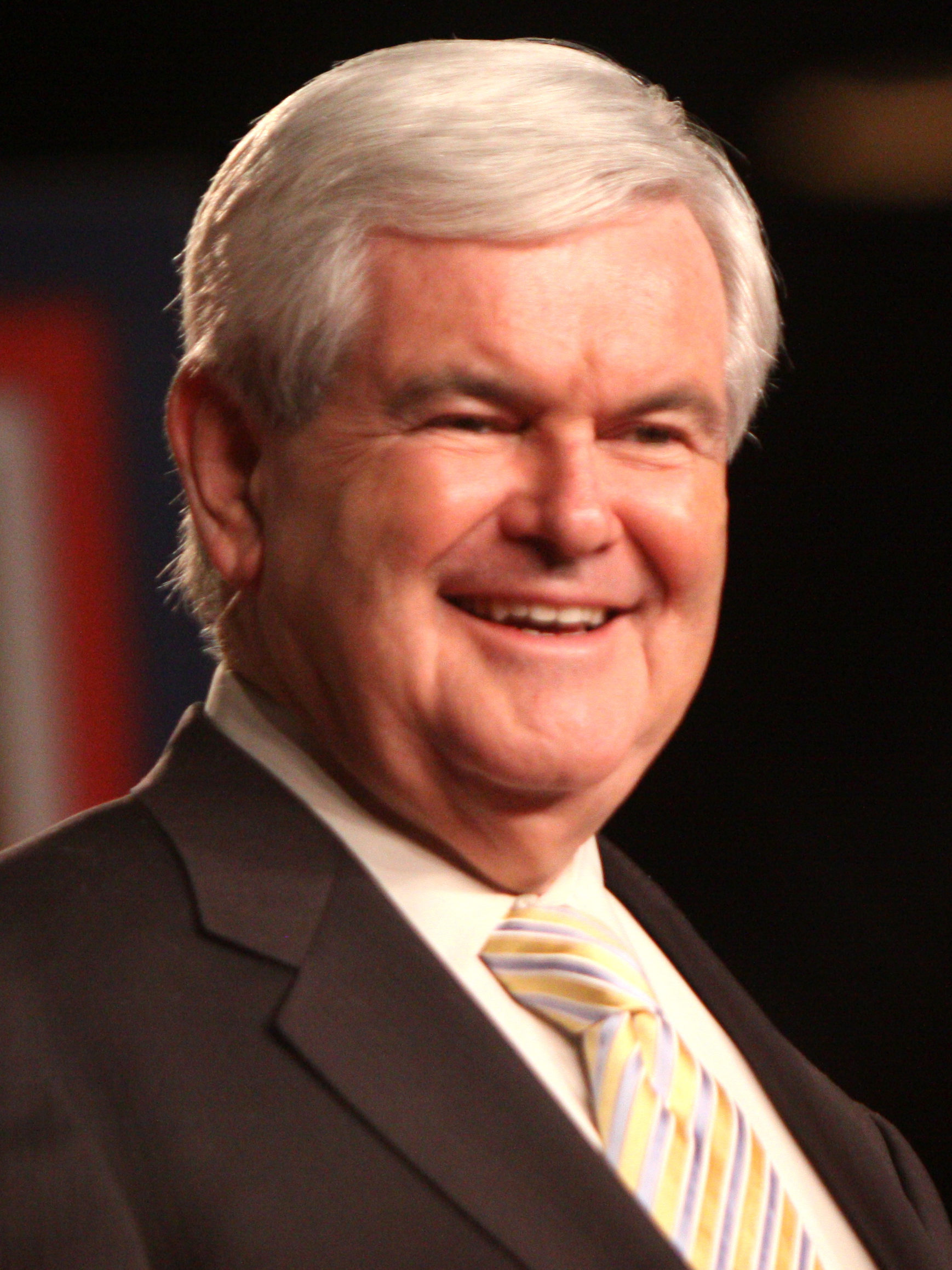
Candidate	Mitt Romney	Rick Santorum
Home state	Massachusetts	Pennsylvania
Delegate count	8	7
Popular vote	4,285	3,860
Percentage	32.42%	29.20%
Candidate	Ron Paul	Newt Gingrich
Home state	Texas	Georgia
Delegate count	6	3
Popular vote	3,175	1,865
Percentage	24.02%	14.11%

The Alaska Republican caucuses were held Super Tuesday, March 6, 2012. The presidential preference poll portion of the caucuses was scheduled between 4 pm and 8 pm local time (which is 8 pm to midnight EST) at locations across the state and one caucus in Washington, D.C.

Similar to the 2012 Nevada caucuses, the results of the presidential preference poll will be used to directly and proportionately apportion 24 national convention delegates among the candidates. Another 3 super delegates are unbound and not determined by the caucus results.

2012 Alaska Republican presidential caucuses
Candidate	Votes	Percentage	Estimated national delegates
Mitt Romney	4,285	32.42%	8
Rick Santorum	3,860	29.20%	7
Ron Paul	3,175	24.02%	6
Newt Gingrich	1,865	14.11%	3
Uncommitted	34	0.26%	
Unprojected delegates:			3
Totals	13,219	100.00%	27

== General election ==
=== Predictions ===
Source	Ranking	As of
Huffington Post	Safe R	November 6, 2012
CNN	Safe R	November 6, 2012
The New York Times	Safe R	November 6, 2012
The Washington Post	Safe R	November 6, 2012
RealClearPolitics	Solid R	November 6, 2012
Sabato's Crystal Ball	Solid R	November 5, 2012
FiveThirtyEight	Solid R	November 6, 2012

=== Candidate ballot access ===
- Barack Obama/Joseph Biden, Democratic
- Mitt Romney/Paul Ryan, Republican
- Gary Johnson/James P. Gray, Libertarian
- Jill Stein/Cheri Honkala, Green

Write-in candidate access

- Rocky Anderson/Luis J. Rodriguez, Justice

=== Results ===
2012 United States presidential election in Alaska
Party	Candidate	Running mate	Votes	Percentage	Electoral votes
Republican	Mitt Romney	Paul Ryan	164,676	54.80%	3
Democratic	Barack Obama (incumbent)	Joe Biden (incumbent)	122,640	40.81%	0
Libertarian	Gary Johnson	Jim Gray	7,392	2.46%	0
Green	Jill Stein	Cheri Honkala	2,917	0.97%	0
Write-ins	Write-ins		2,870	0.96%	0
Totals			300,495	100.00%	3

Boroughs and census areas that flipped from Republican to Democratic

- Aleutians West Census Area (largest city: Unalaska)
- Dilingham Census Area (largest city: Dilingham)
- Lake & Peninsula Borough (largest city: Newhalen)
- North Slope Borough (largest city: Barrow)
- Northwest Arctic Borough (largest city: Kotzebue)
- Prince of Wales–Hyder Census Area (largest city: Craig)
- Yukon–Koyukuk Census Area (largest city: Fort Yukon)

=== By congressional district ===
Due to the state's low population, only one congressional district is allocated. This district, an at-large district because it covers the entire state, is thus equivalent to the statewide election results.

District	Romney	Obama	Representative
At-large	54.80%	40.81%	Don Young

== See also ==
- List of 2012 United States presidential electors
- 2012 United States presidential election
- 2008 United States presidential election in Alaska
- 2012 Democratic Party presidential primaries
- 2012 Republican Party presidential primaries
- Alaska Democratic Party
- Alaska Republican Party
- United States presidential elections in Alaska
