= Iliamna River =

- Map of Lake Clark National Park and Lake Clark National Preserve. Iliamna Lake is at the bottom left with the Iliamna River at the far east of it. Old Iliamna is indicated on the map along the river.
- Location of mouth

Location
- Country: United States
- State: Alaska

Physical characteristics
- Mouth
  - location: Iliamna Lake
  - coordinates: 59°44′10″N 153°58′34″W

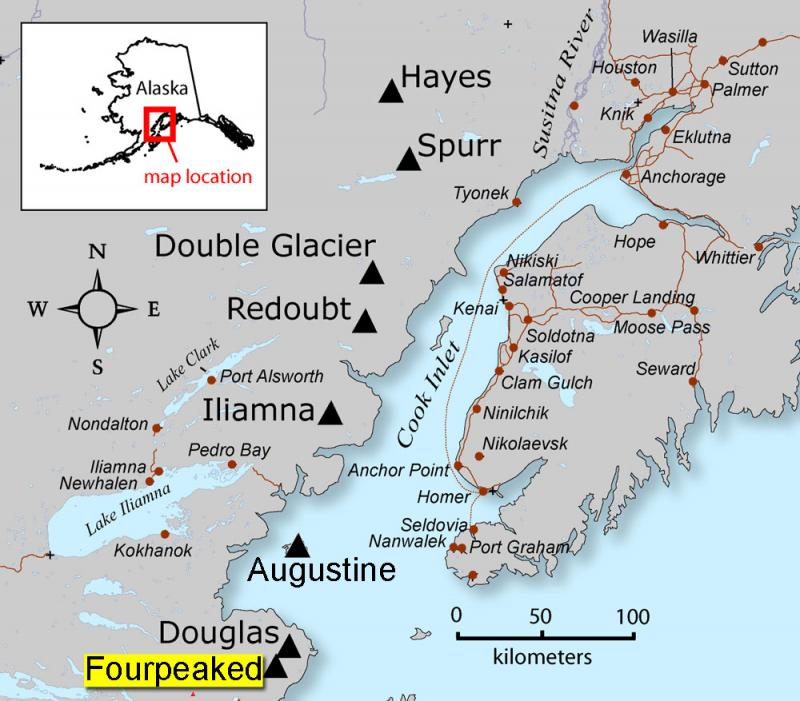
Map showing Lake Iliamna on left. The Iliamna River feeds into the lake east of Pedro Bay.

The Iliamna River is a river in Alaska that flows into Iliamna Lake. Old Iliamna was located near the confluence. Guth's Lodge is located along the river. The Chigmit Mountains are to the northeast. The river is by Lonesome Point, Old Iliamna and Pile Bay Village.

While no road connects the local communities to Alaska's road and highway system, a road connecting Williamsport, Alaska on Iliamna Bay along the Alaskan coast to Pike's Bay on Lake Iliamna provides an important transit route for boaters. The 15-mile road enables a shortcut for fishing vessels crossing from Cook Inlet and landing in Williamsport. They can take the road to Pile Bay and then navigate across Iliamna Lake and down the Kvichak River to commercial fisheries at Bristol Bay. The 320-mile route is an alternative to a 1,000-mile journey around the Alaska Peninsula. A company tows the boats over the road. Flooding held up transit operations in 2018.

In 2016, a historic truss bridge over the river was offered for free to anyone that wanted it and could remove it as construction on a replacement was initiated. The river floods often.
