= St. Nicholas Chapel (Pedro Bay, Alaska) =

Historic church in Alaska, United States

- U.S. National Register of Historic Places
- Alaska Heritage Resources Survey
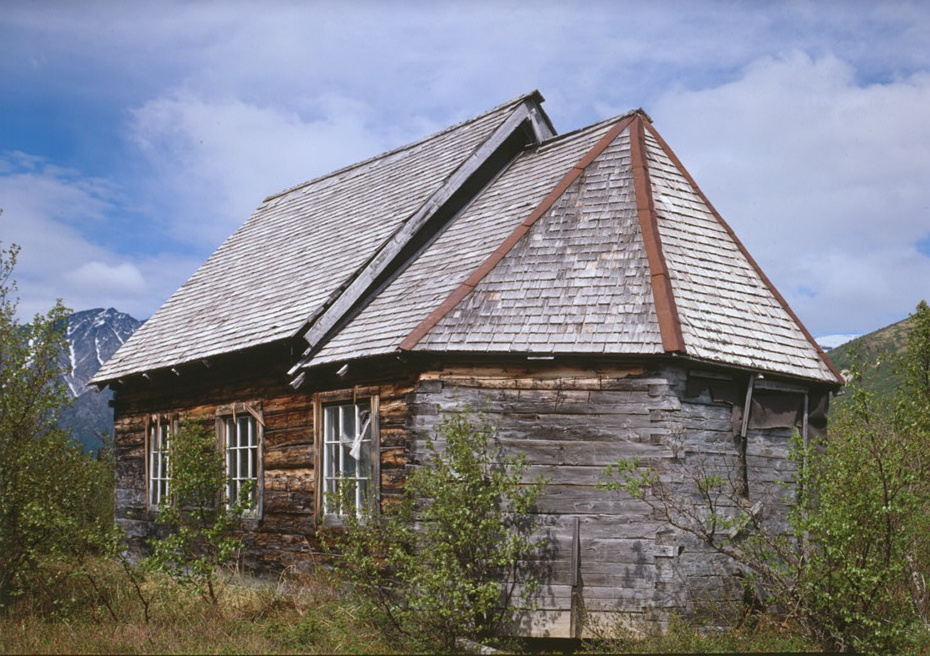

- Location within Alaska
- Location: In Pedro Bay, Pedro Bay, Alaska
- Coordinates: 59°47′07″N 154°06′10″W
- Area: less than one acre
- Built: 1890
- MPS: Russian Orthodox Church Buildings and Sites TR
- NRHP reference No.: 80000753
- AHRS No.: ILI-022

Significant dates
- Added to NRHP: June 6, 1980
- Designated AHRS: May 18, 1973

The St. Nicholas Chapel is a historic Russian Orthodox church in Pedro Bay, Alaska, United States, that was built in 1890.

It is a 15-by-15-foot (4.6 m × 4.6 m) building with an extension at its altar end. It has log walls. In 1973, it was in quite good condition and appeared unaltered from its original 1890 construction.

The building was listed on the National Register of Historic Places in 1980.
