= North Aleutians Basin =

The North Aleutians Basin, also known as the Bristol Bay Basin or the Alaska Peninsula Basin, is a submarine basin located in the Bristol Bay region of the Bering Sea, north of the Alaska Peninsula. The basin is approximately 100 mi (160 km) wide and 400 mi (640 km) long, reaching depths of up to 20,000 ft (6,100 m).

As recently as October 2005, both the state of Alaska and the U.S. Minerals Management Service had plans to develop the oil and natural gas potential of the area. One proposal would have offshore platforms extracting natural gas north of the village of Nelson Lagoon and transporting the gas via pipeline to a processing facility to the Pacific Ocean side near Sand Point.
