= Kokhanok, Alaska =

Kokhanok, Alaska Qarr’unaq
- Census-designated place
- Location within Alaska
- Coordinates: 59°26′27″N 154°44′49″W
- Country: United States
- State: Alaska
- Borough: Lake and Peninsula

Government
  - Borough mayor: Glen Alsworth, Sr.
  - State senator: Lyman Hoffman (D)
  - State rep.: Bryce Edgmon (I)

Area
  - Total: 21.09 sq mi (54.62 km^{2})
  - Land: 20.98 sq mi (54.33 km^{2})
  - Water: 0.11 sq mi (0.29 km^{2})
- Elevation: 100 ft (30 m)

Population (2020)
  - Total: 152
  - Density: 7.3/sq mi (2.8/km^{2})
- Time zone: UTC-9 (Alaska (AKST))
  - Summer (DST): UTC-8 (AKDT)
- ZIP code: 99606
- Area code: 907
- FIPS code: 02-41280

Kokhanok (Central Yupik: Qarr’unaq) is a census-designated place (CDP) in Lake and Peninsula Borough, Alaska, United States. At the 2020 census the population was 152, down from 170 in 2000.

== Geography ==
Kokhanok is at 59°26′27″N 154°44′49″W (59.440927, -154.746974). It is on the south shore of Iliamna Lake, 37 km (23 mi) south of Iliamna.

According to the United States Census Bureau, the Kokhanok CDP has an area of 20.9 square miles (54.2 km^{2}), of which 20.8 square miles (53.9 km^{2}) are land and 0.1 square miles (0.3 km^{2}), or 0.56%, are water.

== Demographics ==
Historical population
Census	Pop.	Note	%±
1890	28		—
1950	39		—
1960	57		46.2%
1970	88		54.4%
1980	83		−5.7%
1990	152		83.1%
2000	174		14.5%
2010	170		−2.3%
2020	152		−10.6%
U.S. Decennial Census

Kokhanok first appeared on the 1890 U.S. Census as a native unincorporated village named "Kakhonak." It next returned in 1950. The name was changed to the present spelling of Kokhanok in 1980, when it was made a census-designated place (CDP).

As of the census of 2000, there were 174 people, 52 households, and 40 families residing in the CDP. The population density was 8.2 inhabitants per square mile (3.2/km^{2}). There were 59 housing units at an average density of 2.8 per square mile (1.1/km^{2}). The racial makeup of the CDP was 8.05% White, 86.78% Native American, 1.15% from other races, and 4.02% from two or more races. 1.15% of the population were Hispanic or Latino of any race.

There were 52 households, out of which 38.5% had children under the age of 18 living with them, 34.6% were married couples living together, 26.9% had a female householder with no husband present, and 21.2% were non-families. 17.3% of all households were made up of individuals, and 1.9% had someone living alone who was 65 years of age or older. The average household size was 3.35 and the average family size was 3.68.

In the CDP, the population was spread out, with 35.1% under the age of 18, 11.5% from 18 to 24, 30.5% from 25 to 44, 17.2% from 45 to 64, and 5.7% who were 65 years of age or older. The median age was 30 years. For every 100 females, there were 141.7 males. For every 100 females age 18 and over, there were 145.7 males.

The median income for a household in the CDP was $19,583, and the median income for a family was $32,500. Males had a median income of $33,333 versus $0 for females. The per capita income for the CDP was $7,732. About 40.0% of families and 42.6% of the population were below the poverty line, including 60.0% of those under the age of eighteen and none of those 65 or over.

The population is a mixture of Aleut, Yup'ik and Athabaskan. Unlike Iliamna, the sport fishing industry doesn't reach Kokhanok, and the economic activity is based on subsistence hunting and fishing.
