= Kvichak River =

Navigable river in southwest Alaska

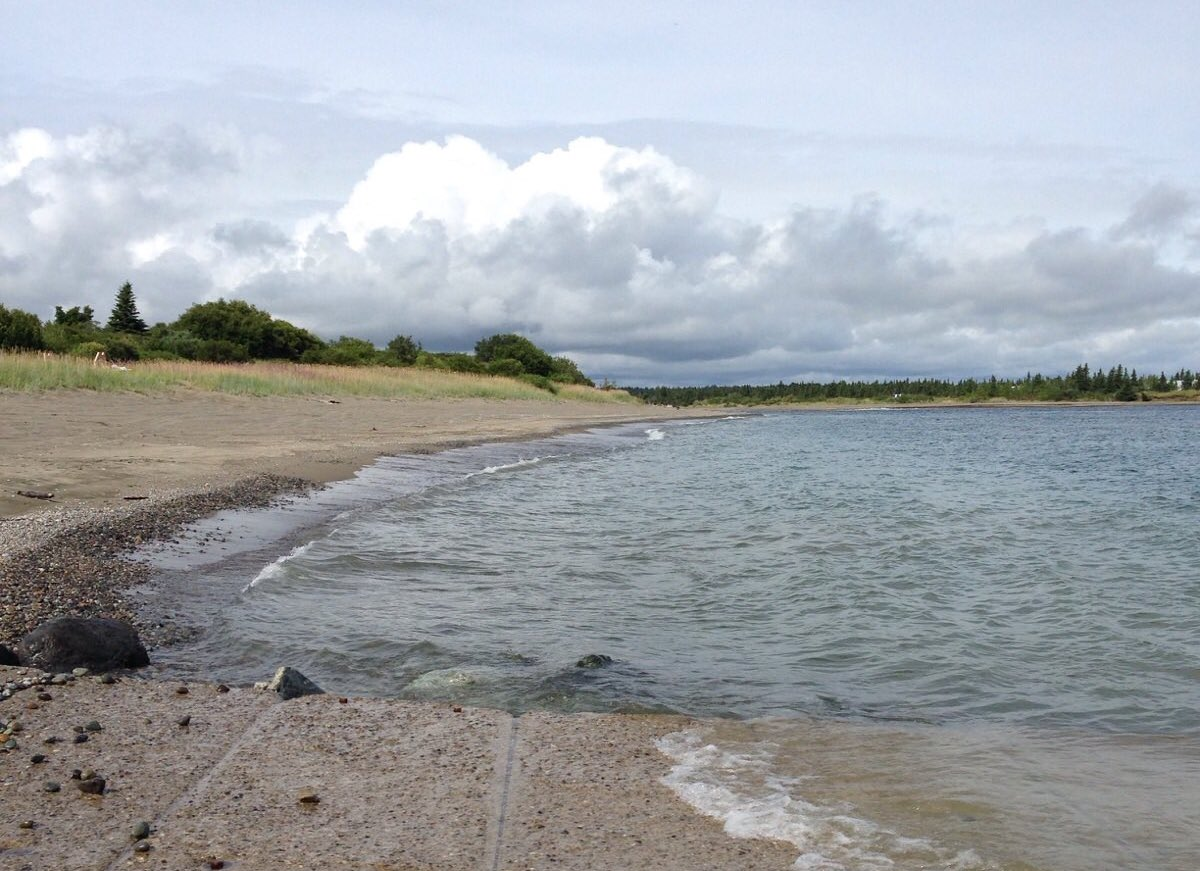
- Kvichak River

- Location of the mouth of the Kvichak River in Alaska
- Etymology: small river
- Native name: Kuicaraq (Central Yupik)

Location
- Country: United States
- State: Alaska
- Borough: Lake and Peninsula, Bristol Bay

Physical characteristics
- Source: Iliamna Lake
  - location: Lake and Peninsula
  - coordinates: 59°19′51″N 155°52′56″W
  - elevation: 46 ft (14 m)
- Mouth: Kvichak Bay
  - location: 9 miles (14 km) north of Naknek, Bristol Bay, Alaska Peninsula
  - coordinates: 58°52′50″N 157°02′14″W
  - elevation: 0 ft (0 m)
- Length: 50 mi (80 km)
- Basin size: 16,830 km^{2} (6,500 sq mi)
- Discharge
  - average: 503 m^{3}/s (17,800 cu ft/s)

The Kvichak River (/ˈkwiːdʒæk/ KWEE-jak; Yup'ik: Kuicaraq) is a large river, about 50 miles (80 km) long, in southwestern Alaska in the United States. It flows southwest from Lake Iliamna to Kvichak Bay, an arm of Bristol Bay, on the Alaska Peninsula. The communities of Igiugig and Levelock lie along the Kvichak River. The Kvichak is navigable along its entire length, and is used as a short cut by boats getting between Cook Inlet and Bristol Bay via the Lake Iliamna portage.

The Kvichak River is home to the largest sockeye salmon run in the world. Commercial harvests are worth hundreds of millions of U.S. dollars annually.

The Kvichak River is part of the watershed downstream of the proposed Pebble Mine.

Historically, the river was navigated and subsistence fished by local Alaska Natives. The name of the river means from- or up to- great water, a reference to Iliamna Lake, Alaska's largest freshwater lake.

The Kvichak River was a finalist for the 2017 International Riverprize award for being one of the best-managed and sustainable rivers in the world.

== See also ==
- List of rivers of Alaska
