= Pedro Bay, Alaska =

- Census-designated place
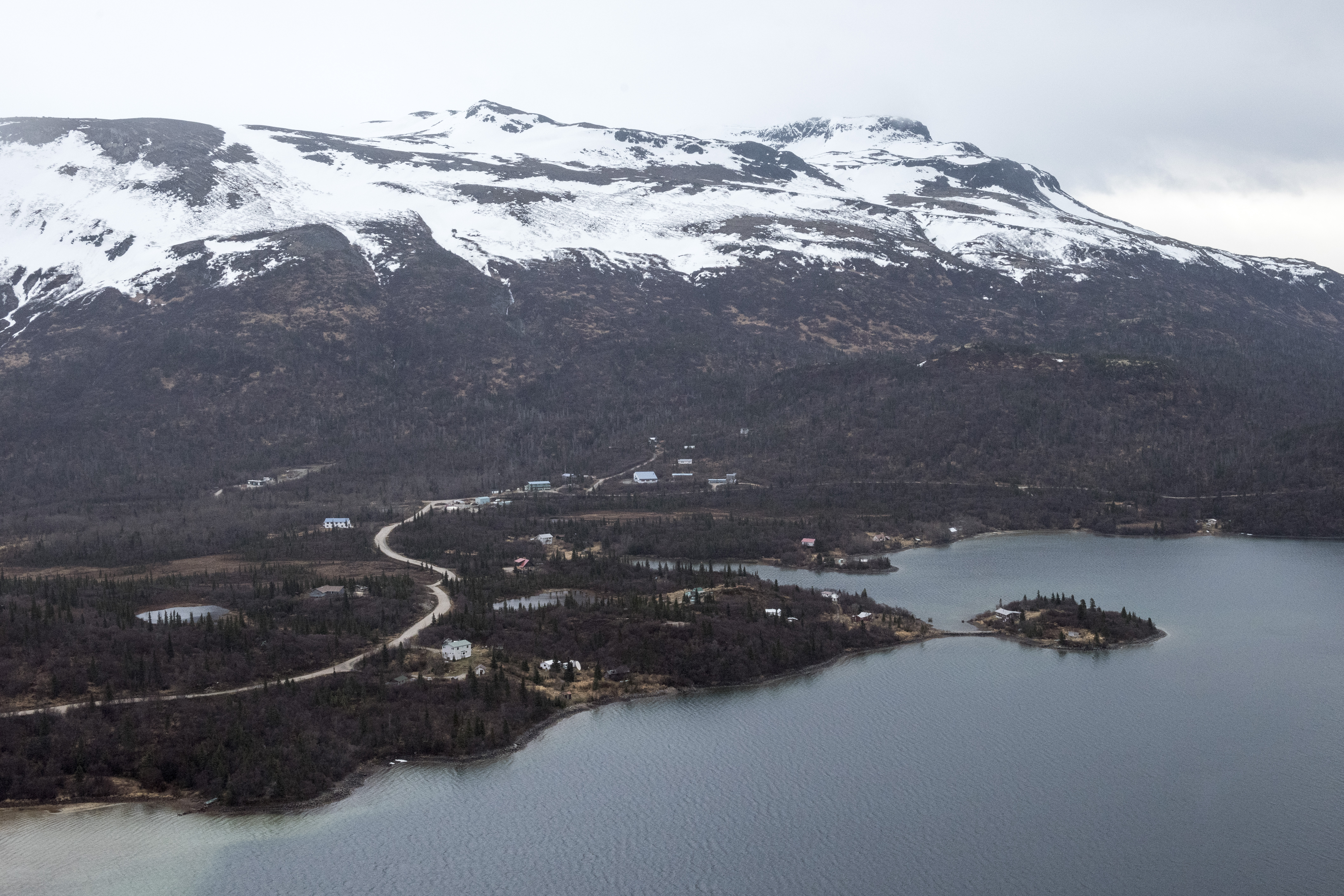
- Aerial view of Pedro Bay in May 2018

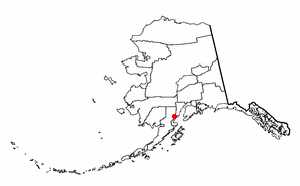
- Location of Pedro Bay, Alaska
- Coordinates: 59°46′56″N 154°7′57″W
- Country: United States
- State: Alaska
- Borough: Lake and Peninsula

Government
  - Borough mayor: Glen Alsworth, Sr.
  - State senator: Lyman Hoffman (D)
  - State rep.: Bryce Edgmon (I)

Area
  - Total: 23.29 sq mi (60.32 km^{2})
  - Land: 19.48 sq mi (50.45 km^{2})
  - Water: 3.81 sq mi (9.87 km^{2})

Population (2020)
  - Total: 43
  - Density: 2.2/sq mi (0.85/km^{2})
- Time zone: UTC-9 (Alaska (AKST))
  - Summer (DST): UTC-8 (AKDT)
- ZIP code: 99647
- Area code: 907
- FIPS code: 02-59540

Pedro Bay is a census-designated place (CDP) in Lake and Peninsula Borough, Alaska, United States. The population was 43 as of the 2020 census, slightly up from 42 in 2010.

== Geography ==
Pedro Bay is located at 59°46′56″N 154°07′57″W. It is at the head of Pedro Bay, on the northeast end of Iliamna Lake. The CDP extends northwest to the south shore of Knutson Bay and east to the north shore of Pile Bay on Iliamna Lake.

According to the United States Census Bureau, the CDP has a total area of 19.3 square miles (50.0 km^{2}), of which 17.1 square miles (44.2 km^{2}) are land and 2.2 square miles (5.8 km^{2}), or 11.67%, are water.

== History ==
The Dena'ina Athabascan people occupied the area around Pedro Bay historically. They warred with Russian fur traders over trade practices in the early 19th century.

The St. Nicholas Chapel in Pedro Bay is a historic Russian Orthodox church that is listed on the U.S. National Register of Historic Places.

== Demographics ==
Historical population
Census	Pop.	Note	%±
1950	44		—
1960	53		20.5%
1970	65		22.6%
1980	33		−49.2%
1990	42		27.3%
2000	50		19.0%
2010	42		−16.0%
2020	43		2.4%
U.S. Decennial Census

Pedro Bay first appeared on the 1950 U.S. Census as an unincorporated village. It was made a census-designated place (CDP) in 1980.

As of the census of 2000, there were 50 people, 17 households, and 13 families residing in the CDP. The population density was 2.9 inhabitants per square mile (1.1/km^{2}). There were 43 housing units at an average density of 2.5 per square mile (0.97/km^{2}). The racial makeup of the CDP was 36.00% White, 40.00% Native American, and 24.00% from two or more races.

There were 17 households, out of which 64.7% had children under the age of 18 living with them, 52.9% were married couples living together, 11.8% had a female householder with no husband present, and 23.5% were non-families. 17.6% of all households were made up of individuals, and 11.8% consisted of a sole occupant 65 years of age or older. The average household size was 2.94 and the average family size was 3.31.

In the CDP, the population was spread out, with 40.0% under the age of 18, 4.0% from 18 to 24, 34.0% from 25 to 44, 14.0% from 45 to 64, and 8.0% who were 65 years of age or older. The median age was 35 years. For every 100 females, there were 78.6 males. For every 100 females age 18 and over, there were 100.0 males.

The median income for a household in the CDP was $36,750, and the median income for a family was $35,750. Males had a median income of $30,938 versus $36,250 for females. The per capita income for the CDP was $18,420. There were no families and 6.0% of the population living below the poverty line, including no under eighteens and none of those over 64.

== Pedro Bay Corporation ==
Following the passing of the Alaska Native Claims Settlement Act (ANCSA), the Pedro Bay Corporation was formed on September 11, 1973, as the village corporation of Pedro Bay alongside more than 200 other Alaska Native village corporations and 12 Alaska Native Regional Corporations. The act aimed to establish a system of corporate ownership in order to establish financial independence for Alaska Natives, with the Pedro Bay Corporation coming to represent 170 shareholders of Aleut, Eskimo and Indian heritage from the village and surrounding area since its formation. The Pedro Bay Corporation is responsible for the oversight of approximately 92,100 acres (373 km^{2}) of surface land, while the Alaska Native regional corporation for the region, Bristol Bay Native Corporation, owns all subsurface area as defined by ANCSA.

Since its formation, the company's operations have grown to include security services; land, natural resource, and agricultural services; construction; project planning, management and contract administration; transportation services; and medical clinics, physician assistant, EMT, and drug and alcohol testing services. Additionally, the PBC-owned company Pedro Bay Contractors works throughout the area on tasks having to do with observation and security services; land, natural resource, and agricultural services; commercial construction, design, and build; and project planning, management, and contract administration solutions.

As defined by the company's Land Use Policy, access is allowed to the public with written permission on a limited basis. Dividends are paid annually in December to all shareholders and elders represented by the company in addition to scholarship and employment opportunities offered annually.
