= Igiugig, Alaska =

Igiugig, Alaska Igyaraq
- Census-designated place
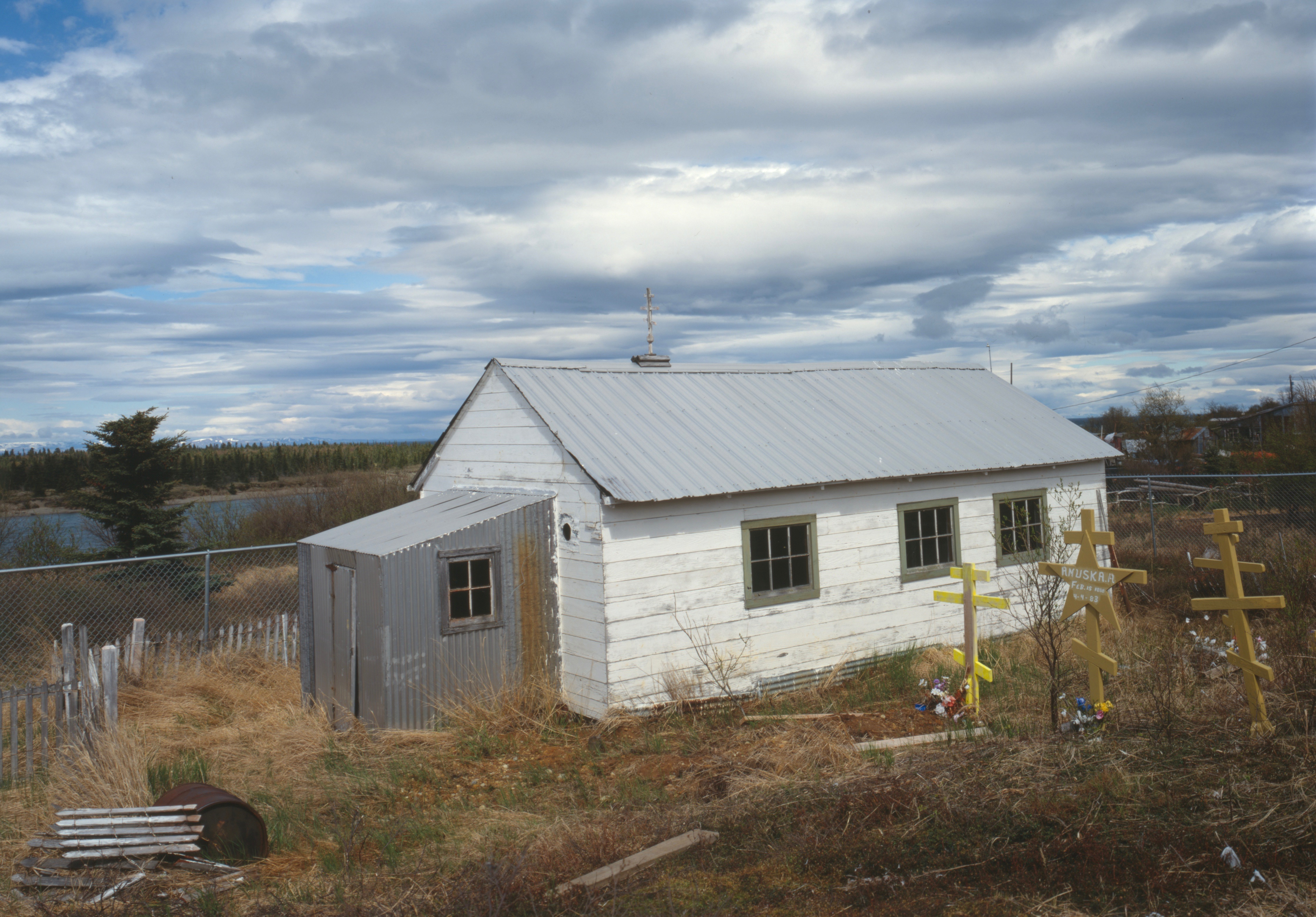
- St. Nicholas Orthodox church in Igiugig
- Interactive map of Igiugig, Alaska
- Location within Alaska Location within North America
- Coordinates: 59°19′49″N 155°54′29″W
- Country: United States
- State: Alaska
- Borough: Lake and Peninsula

Government
  - Borough mayor: Glen Alsworth, Sr.
  - State senator: Lyman Hoffman (D)
  - State rep.: Bryce Edgmon (I)

Area
  - Total: 22.12 sq mi (57.30 km^{2})
  - Land: 21.07 sq mi (54.58 km^{2})
  - Water: 1.05 sq mi (2.71 km^{2})
- Elevation: 50 ft (15 m)

Population (2020)
  - Total: 68
  - Density: 3.2/sq mi (1.25/km^{2})
- Time zone: UTC-9 (Alaska (AKST))
  - Summer (DST): UTC-8 (AKDT)
- Area code: 907
- FIPS code: 02-34790
- Website: igiugig.com

Igiugig (Central Yupik: Igyaraq) is a census-designated place (CDP) in Lake and Peninsula Borough, Alaska, United States. The population was 68 at the 2020 census, up from 54 in 2010. The village is at the source of the Kvichak River, at the outlet of Lake Iliamna.

== History ==
The word Igiugig means "Like a throat that swallows water". The village is named for its location at the outlet of Lake Iliamna, where it flows into the Kvichak River. Most of the population is made up of Yupiks, Aleuts, and Athabascans.

== Geography ==
Igiugig is located at 59°19′49″N 155°54′29″W (59.330327, -155.907926), at the southwest end of Lake Iliamna.

According to the United States Census Bureau, the CDP has a total area of 22.1 square miles (57.3 km^{2}), of which 20.6 square miles (53.3 km^{2}) are land and 1.5 square miles (4.0 km^{2}), or 6.98%, are water.

== Demographics ==
Historical population
Census	Pop.	Note	%±
1970	36		—
1980	33		−8.3%
1990	33		0.0%
2000	53		60.6%
2010	54		1.9%
2020	68		25.9%
U.S. Decennial Census

Igiugig first appeared on the 1970 U.S. Census as an unincorporated village. It was made a census-designated place (CDP) in 1980.

As of the census of 2000, there were 53 people, 16 households, and 13 families residing in the CDP. The population density was 2.7 inhabitants per square mile (1.0/km^{2}). There were 20 housing units at an average density of 1.0 units per square mile (0.39 units/km^{2}). The racial makeup of the CDP was 16.98% White, 71.70% Native American, and 11.32% from two or more races. 1.89% of the population were Hispanic or Latino of any race.

There were 16 households, out of which 43.8% had children under the age of 18 living with them, 56.3% were married couples living together, 25.0% had a female householder with no husband present, and 18.8% were non-families. 18.8% of all households were made up of individuals, and 6.3% had someone living alone who was 65 years of age or older. The average household size was 3.31 and the average family size was 3.77.

In the CDP, the population was spread out, with 43.4% under the age of 18, 1.9% from 18 to 24, 32.1% from 25 to 44, 17.0% from 45 to 64, and 5.7% who were 65 years of age or older. The median age was 36 years. For every 100 females, there were 76.7 males. For every 100 females age 18 and over, there were 100.0 males.

The median income for a household in the CDP was $21,750, and the median income for a family was $22,250. The per capita income for the CDP was $13,172. None of the families and 6.9% of the population were below the poverty line. All of the people living in poverty are aged 65 or above.
