= Ivanof Bay, Alaska =

Ivanof Bay, Alaska Kangi'asinaq
- Census-designated place
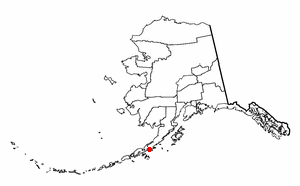
- Location of Ivanof Bay, Alaska
- Coordinates: 55°54′40″N 159°29′21″W
- Country: United States
- State: Alaska
- Borough: Lake and Peninsula

Government
  - Borough mayor: Glen Alsworth, Sr.
  - State senator: Lyman Hoffman (D)
  - State rep.: Bryce Edgmon (I)

Area
  - Total: 4.19 sq mi (10.86 km^{2})
  - Land: 4.19 sq mi (10.86 km^{2})
  - Water: 0 sq mi (0.00 km^{2})
- Elevation: 20 ft (6.1 m)

Population (2020)
  - Total: 1
  - Density: 0.23/sq mi (0.09/km^{2})
- Time zone: UTC-9 (Alaska (AKST))
  - Summer (DST): UTC-8 (AKDT)
- Area code: 907
- FIPS code: 02-35890

Ivanof Bay (Sugpiaq: Kangi'asinaq) is a census-designated place (CDP) in Lake and Peninsula Borough, Alaska, United States. The population was just one at the 2020 census, down from seven in 2010.

== Geography ==
Ivanof Bay is on the south side of the Alaska Peninsula at 55°54′40″N 159°29′21″W (55.911004, -159.489113). It is the farthest southwest community in the Lake and Peninsula Borough of Alaska, 13 miles (21 km) west of Perryville and 53 miles (85 km) northeast of Sand Point in the Aleutians East Borough.

According to the United States Census Bureau, the Ivanof Bay CDP has an area of 4.2 square miles (10.9 km^{2}), all land. It sits at the north end of the bay of the same name, an arm of the Pacific Ocean.

== Demographics ==
Historical population
| Census | Pop. | Note | %± |
|---|---|---|---|
| 1970 | 48 | | — |
| 1980 | 40 | | −16.7% |
| 1990 | 35 | | −12.5% |
| 2000 | 22 | | −37.1% |
| 2010 | 7 | | −68.2% |
| 2020 | 1 | | −85.7% |
U.S. Decennial Census

Ivanof Bay first appeared on the 1970 U.S. Census as an unincorporated village. It was made a census-designated place (CDP) in 1980.

As of the census of 2000, there were 22 people, 9 households, and 7 families residing in the CDP. The population density was 6.5 inhabitants per square mile (2.5/km^{2}). There were 12 housing units at an average density of 3.6 units per square mile (1.4 units/km^{2}). The racial makeup of the CDP was 4.55% White and 95.45% Native American.

There were 9 households, out of which 22.2% had children under the age of 18 living with them, 33.3% were married couples living together, and 22.2% were non-families. 22.2% of all households were made up of individuals. The average household size was 2.44 and the average family size was 2.86.

In the CDP, the population was spread out, with 18.2% under the age of 18, 18.2% from 18 to 24, 31.8% from 25 to 44, and 31.8% from 45 to 64. The median age was 40 years. For every 100 females, there were 266.7 males. For every 100 females age 18 and over, there were 350.0 males.

The median income for a household in the CDP was $91,977, and the median income for a family was $91,977. The per capita income for the CDP was $21,983. None of the population were below the poverty line.
