= Iliamna Lake =

Lake in southwest Alaska, U.S.

- Nanvarpak (Central Yupik); Nila Vena (Denaʼina)
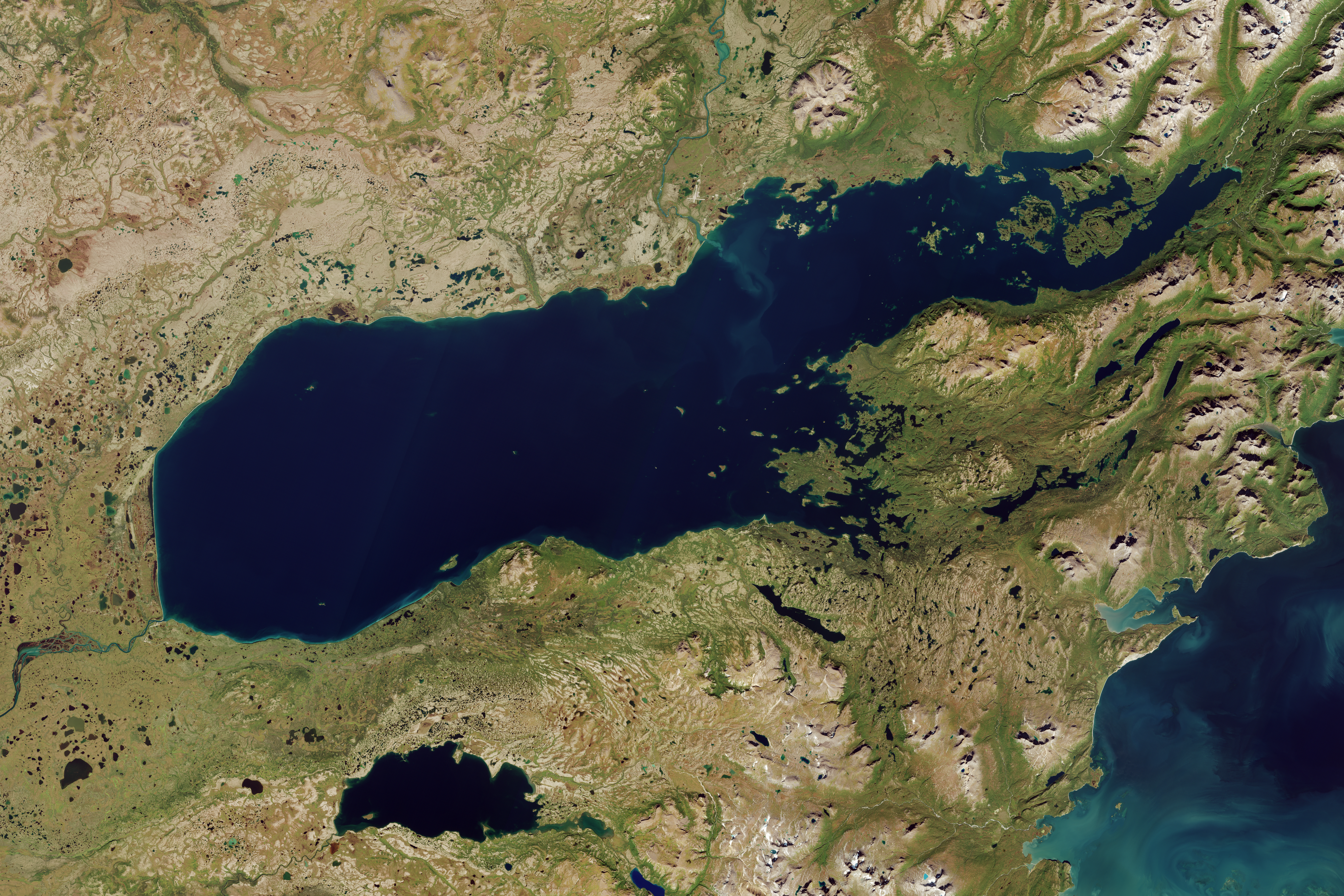
- Satellite image of Iliamna Lake

- Location within Alaska Location within North America
- Location: Lake and Peninsula Borough, Alaska
- Coordinates: 59°32′12″N 155°01′28″W
- Lake type: oligotrophic
- Primary inflows: Newhalen River, Iliamna River, Pile River, Copper River
- Primary outflows: Kvichak River
- Basin countries: United States
- Max. length: 77 mi (124 km)
- Max. width: 22 mi (35 km)
- Surface area: 1,012.5 sq mi (2,622 km^{2})
- Average depth: 144 ft (44 m)
- Max. depth: 988 ft (301 m)
- Water volume: 115.5 km^{3} (27.7 cu mi)
- Residence time: 7.8 years
- Surface elevation: 46 ft (14 m)
- Settlements: Iliamna, Newhalen, Kokhanok, Pedro Bay, Igiugig

Iliamna Lake or Lake Iliamna (/ˌɪliˈæmnə/ IL-ee-AM-nə; Yup'ik: Nanvarpak; Dena'ina Athabascan: Nila Vena) is a lake in southwest Alaska, at the north end of the Alaska Peninsula, between Kvichak Bay and Cook Inlet, about 100 miles (160 km) west of Seldovia, Alaska. It shares a name with the Iliamna River, which flows into it, and the nearby community of Iliamna, Alaska.

It is the largest lake in Alaska, 7th largest lake in the United States, and twenty-fourth in North America. Covering about 2,600 km^{2} (1,000 sq mi), Iliamna Lake is 77 miles (124 km) long and up to 22 miles (35 km) wide, with a maximum depth of 988 feet (301 m). Through the Kvichak River, its waters drain into Bristol Bay.

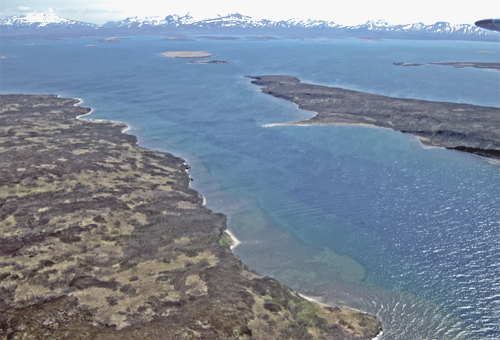
Lake Illiamna Alaska

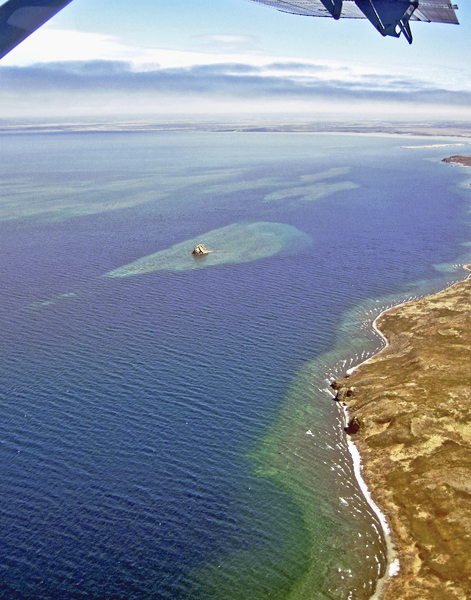
Lake Illiamna Alaska

== History ==
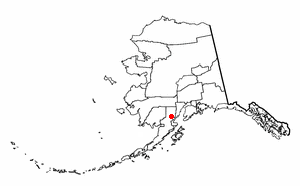
Location of Iliamna in Alaska

=== Name ===
The lake is marked as 'Oz[ero] Bol[shoy] Ilyamna' (Big Ilyamna Lake) on the Russian Hydrographical Department's Chart 1455, published in 1852. On an earlier Russian map, from 1802, the lake was named 'Oz[ero] Shelekhovo' (Lake Shelekov) after Russian explorer Grigory Shelekhov. According to G.C. Martin, of the United States Geological Survey, Iliamna is said to be "the name of a mythical great blackfish supposed to inhabit this lake, which bites holes in the bidarkas of bad natives."

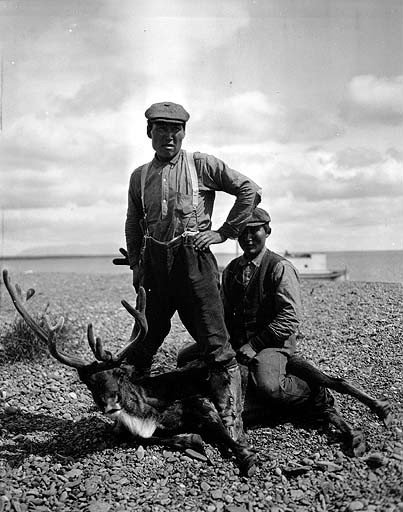
Men pose by the lake with their reindeer, 1917

The name Iliamna is derived from the Inland Dena'ina Athabascan name Nila Vena, which means "island's lake".

== Economy ==
=== Williamsport-Pile Bay Road portage ===
Originally constructed by the Alaska Road Commission during the mid 1930s, the Williamsport-Pile Bay Road is a utility-class road maintained by the Alaska Department of Transportation & Public Facilities. Connecting Pile Bay on the lake's northeast side with Williamsport, a tiny settlement on the Iliamna Bay of Cook Inlet (about 100 miles (160 km) southwest of Homer), the road is 15.5 miles (24.9 km) long and one lane wide with four bridges. The Williamsport-Pile Bay Road is maintained as a gravel utility road for the purpose of hauling boats and freight, and is not intended for general purpose use. The road allows boats small enough to be hauled across the road's bridges an opportunity to portage from Cook Inlet to Bristol Bay, saving a trip on the open ocean which involves traveling around the Alaska Peninsula. For this and other reasons, the road is also believed to significantly reduce fuel costs for the Lake Iliamna and Bristol Bay regions.

=== Populated places ===
The villages of Iliamna, Newhalen, Kokhanok, Pedro Bay, Pope-Vannoy Landing and Igiugig lie on the shores of Iliamna Lake.

=== Flora and fauna ===
Iliamna Lake is noted for its sport fishing. The three primary targets of anglers in the lake are trout, salmon, and grayling. August through September is prime time for catching fat rainbow trout, some of which exceed 28 inches long. The Kvichak River (the drainage of Lake Iliamna) is catch and release on trout (and all other native fish), but not on salmon. Sockeye (red) and Chinook (king) salmon are consistently found in the lake and are open to harvest under Alaska Department of Fish and Game Regulations. It serves as a nursery for the largest red salmon run in the world. Red salmon spend half of their 5-year lifespan in fresh water. This is longer than any other species of salmon. Lake Iliamna also has one of few populations of freshwater seals in the world.

== Monster legend ==
Local residents have a number of stories about the alleged Iliamna Lake Monster, an unknown aquatic creature. Speculation exists that reported sightings may be of an undocumented population of white sturgeon. If true, this would be the most northerly population known to exist, just a few hundred miles from the Arctic Circle. Jeremy Wade, presenter of Animal Planet's River Monsters, is among those who speculate these sightings of a reputed "monster" are of a white sturgeon. Others believe that it is a Pacific sleeper shark. Proponents of this theory point to a 2012 YouTube video that shows a smaller Pacific sleeper shark in King Cove Lagoon, King Cove, Alaska. There were several new supposed sightings in 2017. The Anchorage Daily News once offered a prize of $100,000 for concrete proof of its existence.

== See also ==
- List of lakes of Alaska
- List of reported lake monsters
