= Pope-Vannoy Landing, Alaska =

- Census-designated place
- Location within Alaska
- Coordinates: 59°32′15″N 154°31′50″W
- Country: United States
- State: Alaska
- Borough: Lake and Peninsula

Government
  - Borough mayor: Glen Alsworth, Sr.
  - State senator: Lyman Hoffman (D)
  - State rep.: Bryce Edgmon (I)

Area
  - Total: 63.95 sq mi (165.63 km^{2})
  - Land: 55.63 sq mi (144.09 km^{2})
  - Water: 8.32 sq mi (21.55 km^{2})

Population (2020)
  - Total: 6
  - Density: 0.10/sq mi (0.04/km^{2})
- Time zone: UTC-9 (Alaska (AKST))
  - Summer (DST): UTC-8 (AKDT)
- Area code: 907
- FIPS code: 02-62125

Pope-Vannoy Landing is a census-designated place (CDP) in the Lake and Peninsula Borough in the U.S. state of Alaska. The population was six at the 2020 census, same amount as in 2010.

== Geography ==
Pope-Vannoy Landing is located at 59°32′15″N 154°31′50″W (59.537594, -154.530521), on the south side of Iliamna Lake. The CDP includes the lake inlets of Copper River Bay and Intricate Bay and extends east 7 miles (11 km) up the Copper River valley.

According to the United States Census Bureau, the CDP has a total area of 63.9 square miles (165.6 km^{2}), of which 55.6 square miles (144.1 km^{2}) are land and 8.3 square miles (21.5 km^{2}), or 13.01%, are water.

== Demographics ==
Historical population
Census	Pop.	Note	%±
2000	8		—
2010	6		−25.0%
2020	6		0.0%
U.S. Decennial Census

Pope-Vannoy Landing first appeared on the 2000 U.S. Census as a census-designated place (CDP).

As of the census of 2000, there were 8 people, 5 households, and 2 families residing in the CDP. The population density was 0.2 inhabitants per square mile (0.077/km^{2}). There were 19 housing units at an average density of 0.4 per square mile (0.15/km^{2}). The racial makeup of the CDP was 37.50% White, 25.00% Native American, and 37.50% from two or more races.

There were 5 households, out of which 20.0% had children under the age of 18 living with them, 20.0% were married couples living together, and 60.0% were non-families. 60.0% of all households were made up of individuals, and 20.0% had someone living alone who was 65 years of age or older. The average household size was 1.60 and the average family size was 2.50.

In the CDP, the population was spread out, with 12.5% under the age of 18, 12.5% from 18 to 24, 25.0% from 25 to 44, 37.5% from 45 to 64, and 12.5% who were 65 years of age or older. The median age was 45 years. For every 100 females, there were 300.0 males. For every 100 females age 18 and over, there were 250.0 males.

The median income for a household in the CDP was $4,583, and the median income for a family was $3,750. Males had a median income of $0 versus $0 for females. The per capita income for the CDP was $4,325. 75.0% of the population and all of the families were below the poverty line. None of those under the age of 18 or older than 65 were living below the poverty line.
