= Newhalen, Alaska =

City in Alaska, United States

Newhalen, Alaska Nuuriileng, Nughilen
- City
- Location in Alaska
- Coordinates: 59°43′32″N 154°53′40″W
- Country: United States
- State: Alaska
- Borough: Lake and Peninsula
- Incorporated: October 26, 1971

Government
  - Mayor: Margie Olympic
  - State senator: Lyman Hoffman (D)
  - State rep.: Bryce Edgmon (I)

Area
  - Total: 8.50 sq mi (22.01 km^{2})
  - Land: 6.03 sq mi (15.62 km^{2})
  - Water: 2.47 sq mi (6.39 km^{2})
- Elevation: 62 ft (19 m)

Population (2020)
  - Total: 168
  - Density: 27.8/sq mi (10.75/km^{2})
- Time zone: UTC-9 (Alaska (AKST))
  - Summer (DST): UTC-8 (AKDT)
- ZIP code: 99606
- Area code: 907
- FIPS code: 02-53270
- GNIS feature ID: 1406978

Newhalen (Central Yupik: Nuuriileng; Denaʼina: Nughilen) is a city in Lake and Peninsula Borough, Alaska, United States. At the 2020 census, the population was 168.

== Geography ==
Newhalen is located at 59°43′32″N 154°53′40″W (59.725688, -154.894442).

Newhalen is on the north shore of Iliamna Lake in southern Alaska, at the mouth of Newhalen River.

According to the United States Census Bureau, the city has a total area of 8.3 square miles (21 km^{2}), of which, 6.1 square miles (16 km^{2}) of it is land and 2.3 square miles (6.0 km^{2}) of it (27.37%) is water.

The proposed Pebble Mine site is located near Newhalen.

The nearest mountain is called Roadhouse Mountain.

== Demographics ==
Historical population
Census	Pop.	Note	%±
1940	55		—
1950	48		−12.7%
1960	63		31.3%
1970	88		39.7%
1980	87		−1.1%
1990	160		83.9%
2000	160		0.0%
2010	190		18.8%
2020	168		−11.6%
U.S. Decennial Census

=== 2020 census ===
As of the 2020 census, Newhalen had a population of 168. The median age was 28.7 years. 35.1% of residents were under the age of 18 and 9.5% of residents were 65 years of age or older. For every 100 females there were 93.1 males, and for every 100 females age 18 and over there were 87.9 males age 18 and over.

0.0% of residents lived in urban areas, while 100.0% lived in rural areas.

There were 51 households in Newhalen, of which 54.9% had children under the age of 18 living in them. Of all households, 43.1% were married-couple households, 15.7% were households with a male householder and no spouse or partner present, and 29.4% were households with a female householder and no spouse or partner present. About 13.7% of all households were made up of individuals and 0.0% had someone living alone who was 65 years of age or older.

There were 65 housing units, of which 21.5% were vacant. The homeowner vacancy rate was 2.1% and the rental vacancy rate was 40.0%.

Racial composition as of the 2020 census
Race	Number	Percent
White	17	10.1%
Black or African American	0	0.0%
American Indian and Alaska Native	128	76.2%
Asian	0	0.0%
Native Hawaiian and Other Pacific Islander	0	0.0%
Some other race	0	0.0%
Two or more races	23	13.7%
Hispanic or Latino (of any race)	2	1.2%

=== 2000 census ===
As of the census of 2000, there were 160 people, 39 households, and 37 families residing in the city. The population density was 26.4 inhabitants per square mile (10.2/km^{2}). There were 51 housing units at an average density of 8.4 units per square mile (3.2 units/km^{2}). The racial makeup of the city was 8.75% White, 85.00% Native American, and 6.25% from two or more races.

There were 39 households, out of which 59.0% had children under the age of 18 living with them, 56.4% were married couples living together, 12.8% had a female householder with no husband present, and 5.1% were non-families. 5.1% of all households were made up of individuals, and 0.0% consisted of a sole occupant 65 years of age or older. The average household size was 4.10 and the average family size was 4.22.

In the city, the age distribution of the population shows 45.0% under the age of 18, 9.4% from 18 to 24, 20.6% from 25 to 44, 20.0% from 45 to 64, and 5.0% who were 65 years of age or older. The median age was 20 years. For every 100 females, there were 100.0 males. For every 100 females age 18 and over, there were 120.0 males.

The median income for a household in the city was $36,250, and the median income for a family was $35,000. Males had a median income of $38,333 versus $23,750 for females. The per capita income for the city was $9,448. About 26.7% of families and 16.3% of the population were below the poverty line, including 17.9% of those under the age of eighteen and none of those 65 or over.

== History ==
Newhalen was originally a Yup'ik village called Noghelin, after the Newhalen River. "Newhalen" is an Anglicized version of the original name. The village was established in the late 1800s because of the bountiful fish and game in the area.

The population of Newhalen now includes Alutiiqs and Athabascans as well as Yupik. Most pursue subsistence hunting and fishing.
