= Lake and Peninsula Borough, Alaska =

Borough in Alaska, United States

- Borough
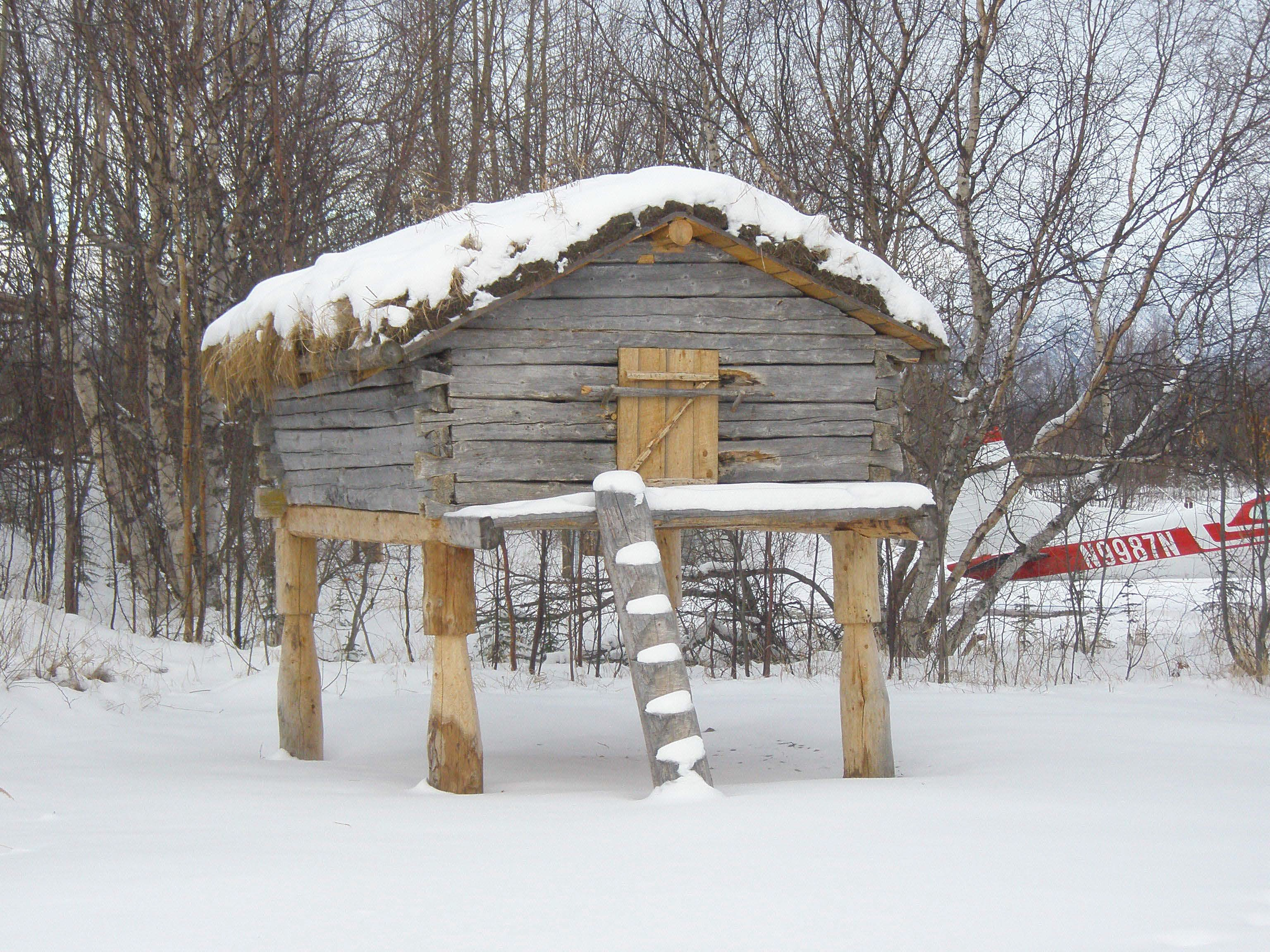
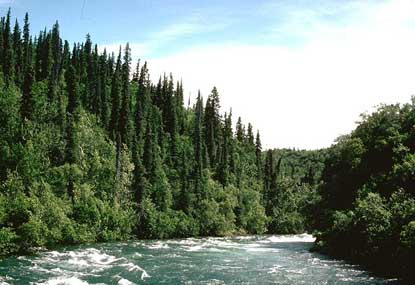
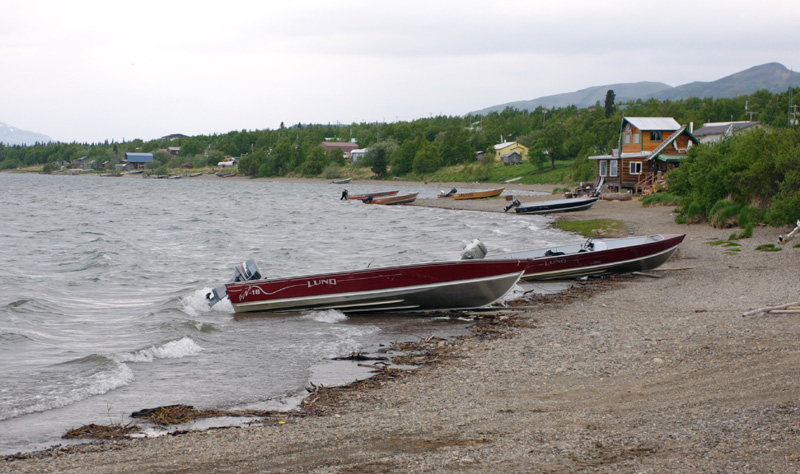
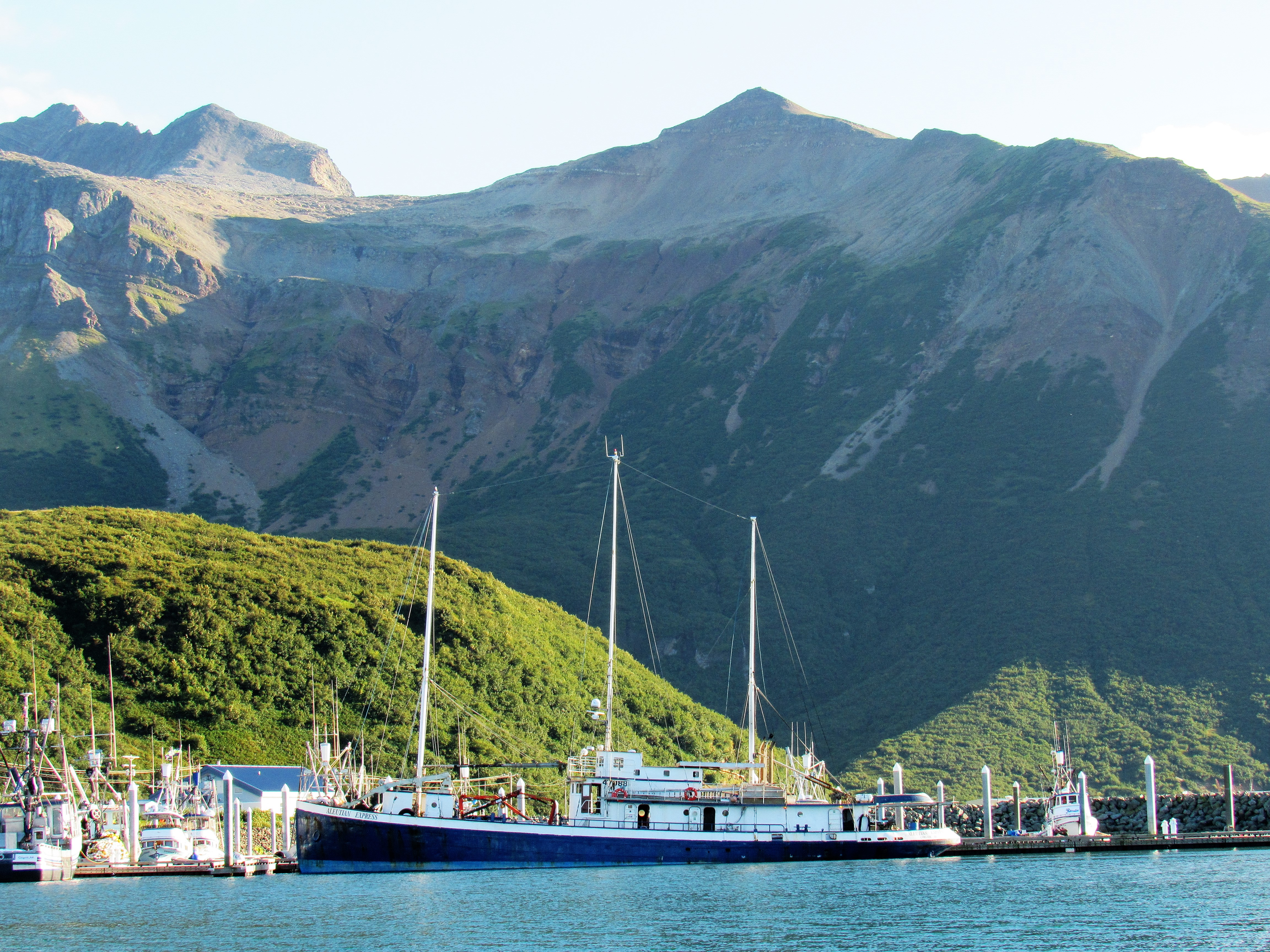
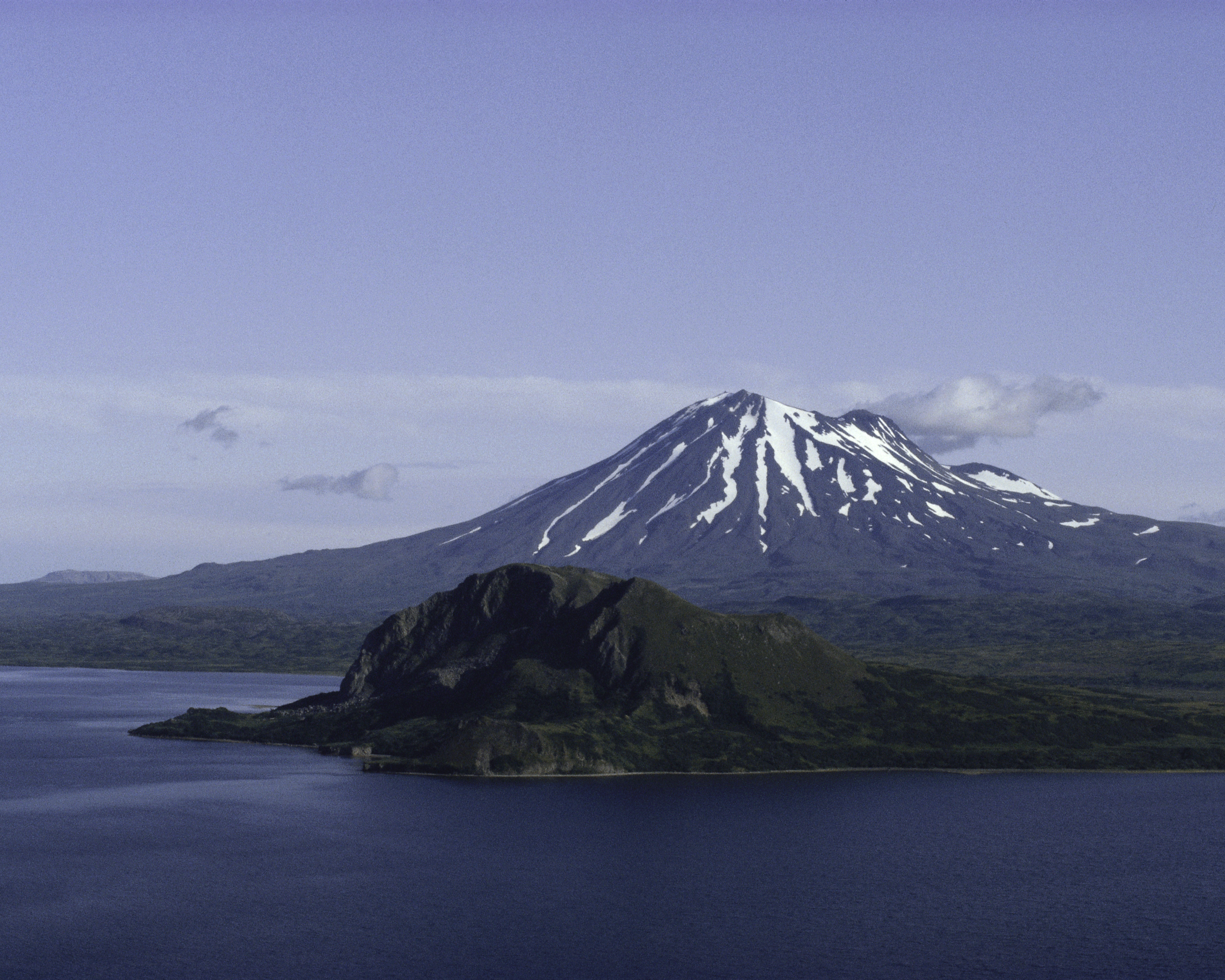
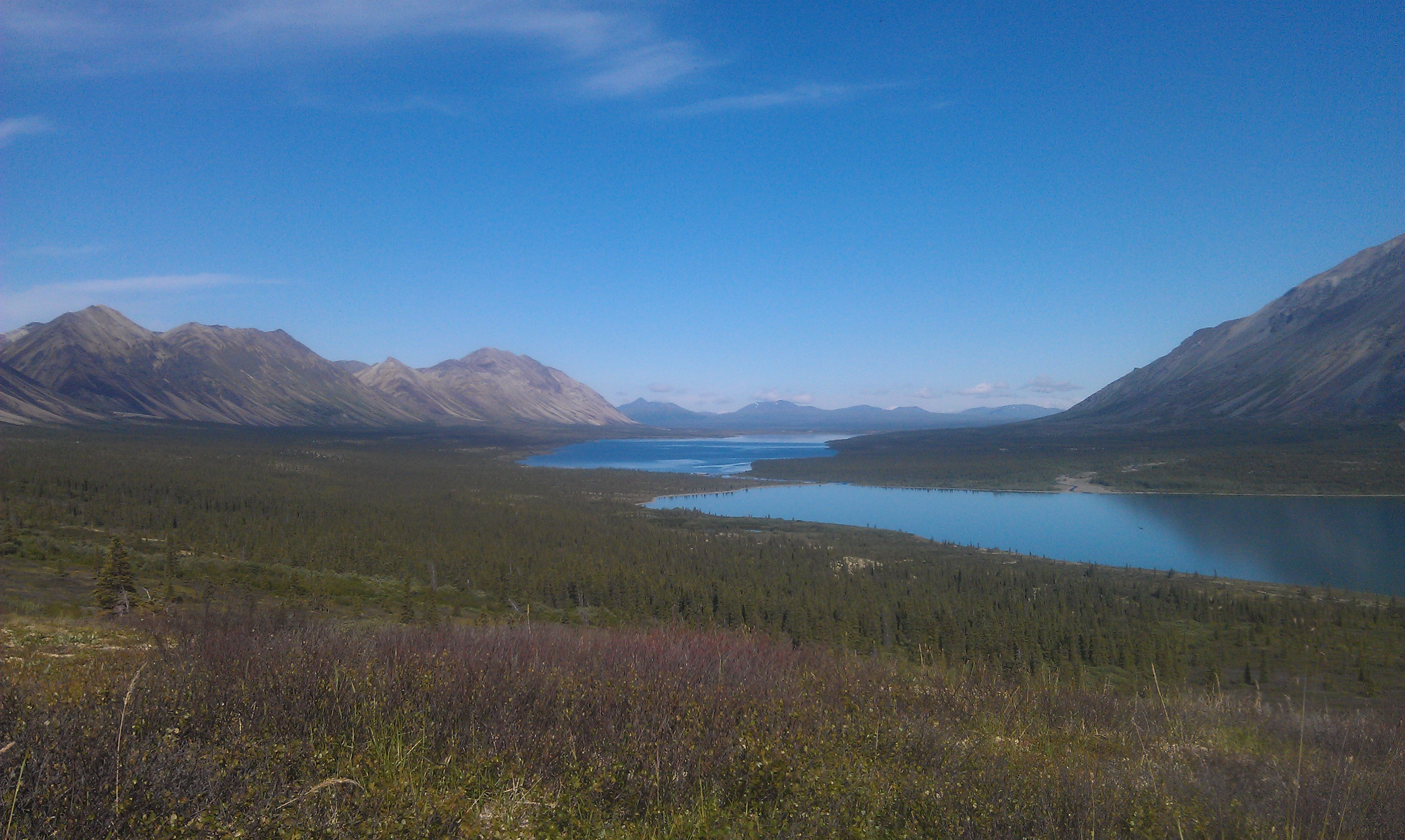
- Left to right, from top: Wassillie Trefon Dena'ina Fish Cache in Port Alsworth, Alagnak River rapids, shore at Nondalton, the Aleutian Express in Chignik Bay, view of Mount Peulik in Becharof National Wildlife Refuge, view of the Twin Lakes

- Seal Logo

- Location within the U.S. state of Alaska
- Coordinates: 58°24′N 156°11′W
- Country: United States
- State: Alaska
- Incorporated: April 24, 1989
- Named for: Iliamna Lake, Becharof Lake and Alaska Peninsula
- Seat: King Salmon
- Largest CDP: Port Alsworth

Government
  - Mayor: Glen R. Alsworth, Sr.

Area
  - Total: 32,922 sq mi (85,270 km^{2})
  - Land: 23,652 sq mi (61,260 km^{2})
  - Water: 9,270 sq mi (24,000 km^{2}) 28.2%

Population (2020)
  - Total: 1,476
  - Estimate (2025): 1,357 ▼
  - Density: 0.06240/sq mi (0.02409/km^{2})
- Time zone: UTC−9 (Alaska)
  - Summer (DST): UTC−8 (ADT)
- Congressional district: At-large
- Website: www.lakeandpen.com

Lake and Peninsula Borough is a borough in the state of Alaska. As of the 2020 census, the population was 1,476, down from 1,631 in 2010. The borough seat of King Salmon is located in neighboring Bristol Bay Borough, although is not the seat of that borough. The most populous community in the borough is the census-designated place of Port Alsworth. With an average of 0.017 inhabitants per square kilometre (0.044 inhabitants/mi^{2}), the Lake and Peninsula Borough is the least densely populated organized county-equivalent in the United States; only the unorganized Yukon–Koyukuk Census Area has a lower density.

== Geography ==
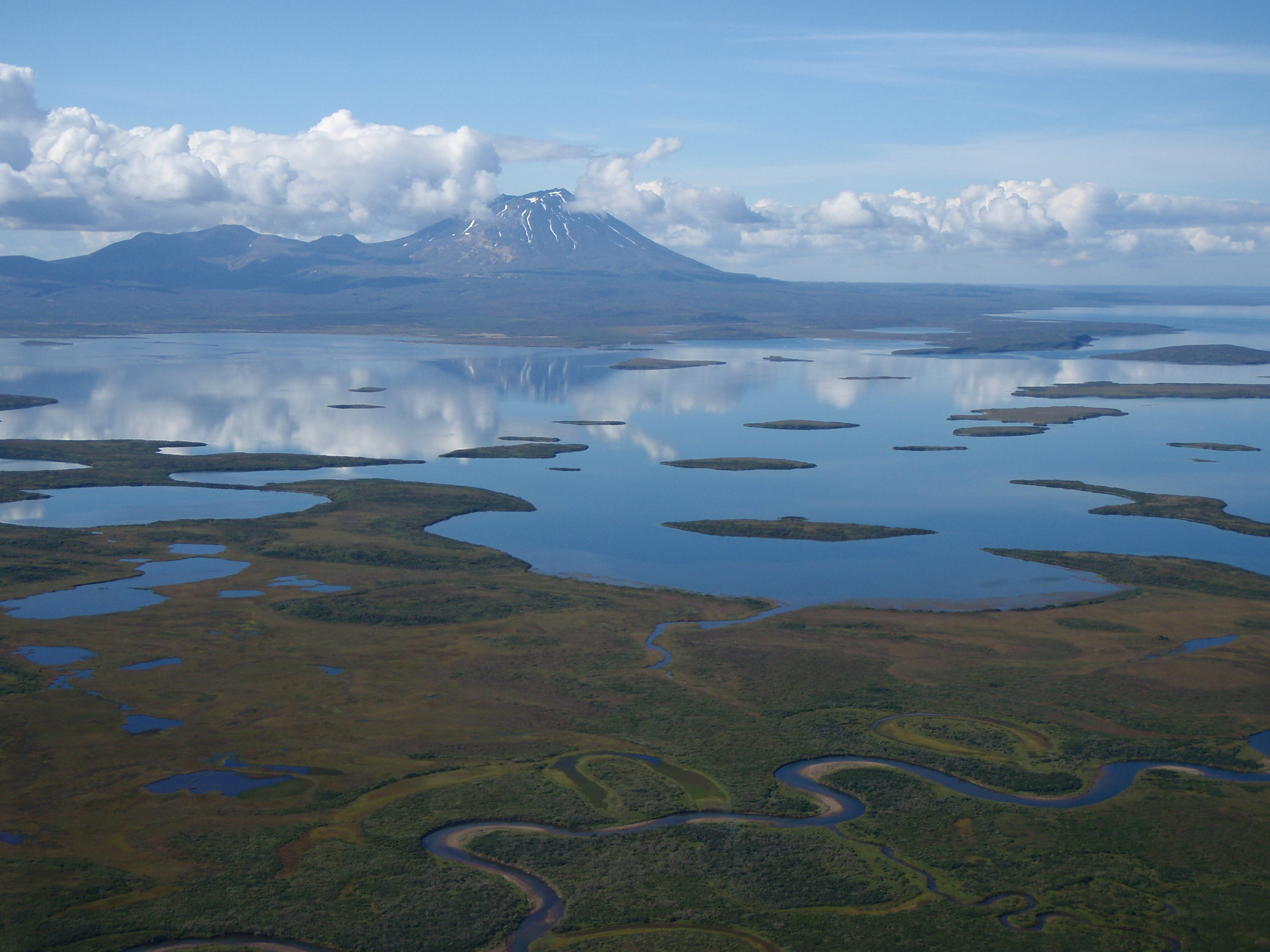
View of Becharof Lake, in the Becharof National Wildlife Refuge

The borough has an area of 32,922 square miles (85,270 km^{2}), of which 23,652 square miles (61,260 km^{2}) is land and 9,270 square miles (24,000 km^{2}) (28.2%) is water. The borough contains Iliamna Lake, the largest lake in Alaska and third largest within United States borders, and occupies most of the Alaska Peninsula. Its land area is larger than that of San Bernardino County, California, the largest county in the contiguous Lower 48 states.

=== Adjacent boroughs and census areas ===
- Bethel Census Area, Alaska – north
- Kenai Peninsula Borough, Alaska – east
- Kodiak Island Borough, Alaska – southeast
- Aleutians East Borough, Alaska – west
- Bristol Bay Borough, Alaska – west
- Dillingham Census Area, Alaska – west

=== National protected areas ===
- Alagnak Wild River
- Alaska Maritime National Wildlife Refuge (part of the Alaska Peninsula unit)
  - Sutwik Island
- Alaska Peninsula National Wildlife Refuge (part)
- Aniakchak National Monument and Preserve
- Becharof National Wildlife Refuge (part)
  - Becharof Wilderness (part)
- Katmai National Park and Preserve (part)
  - Katmai Wilderness (part)
- Lake Clark National Park and Preserve (part)
  - Lake Clark Wilderness (part)

== Demographics ==
Historical population
Census	Pop.	Note	%±
1990	1,668		—
2000	1,823		9.3%
2010	1,631		−10.5%
2020	1,476		−9.5%
2025 (est.)	1,357	▼	−8.1%
U.S. Decennial Census; 1990–2000 2010–2020

=== 2020 census ===
Lake and Peninsula Borough, Alaska – Racial and ethnic composition Note: the US Census treats Hispanic/Latino as an ethnic category. This table excludes Latinos from the racial categories and assigns them to a separate category. Hispanics/Latinos may be of any race.
Race / Ethnicity (NH = Non-Hispanic)	Pop 2000	Pop 2010	Pop 2020	% 2000	% 2010	% 2020
White alone (NH)	342	362	297	18.76%	22.19%	20.12%
Black or African American alone (NH)	1	9	1	0.05%	0.55%	0.07%
Native American or Alaska Native alone (NH)	1,331	1,044	993	73.01%	64.01%	67.28%
Asian alone (NH)	4	6	7	0.22%	0.37%	0.47%
Native Hawaiian or Pacific Islander alone (NH)	2	5	0	0.11%	0.31%	0.00%
Other race alone (NH)	0	0	0	0.00%	0.00%	0.00%
Mixed race or Multiracial (NH)	122	162	144	6.69%	9.93%	9.76%
Hispanic or Latino (any race)	21	43	34	1.15%	2.64%	2.30%
Total	1,823	1,631	1,476	100.00%	100.00%	100.00%

As of the 2020 census, the county had a population of 1,476. The median age was 32.1 years; 30.6% of residents were under the age of 18 and 9.3% were 65 years of age or older. For every 100 females there were 96.8 males, and for every 100 females age 18 and over there were 104.2 males age 18 and over.

The racial makeup of the county was 20.5% White, 0.1% Black or African American, 67.3% American Indian and Alaska Native, 0.6% Asian, 0.1% Native Hawaiian and Pacific Islander, 0.0% from some other race, and 11.3% from two or more races. Hispanic or Latino residents of any race comprised 2.3% of the population.

0.0% of residents lived in urban areas, while 100.0% lived in rural areas.

There were 543 households in the county, of which 38.7% had children under the age of 18 living with them and 24.5% had a female householder with no spouse or partner present. About 27.7% of all households were made up of individuals and 6.5% had someone living alone who was 65 years of age or older.

There were 1,469 housing units, of which 63.0% were vacant. Among occupied housing units, 71.1% were owner-occupied and 28.9% were renter-occupied. The homeowner vacancy rate was 6.5% and the rental vacancy rate was 15.6%.

=== 2000 census ===
As of the 2000 census, there were 1,823 people, 588 households, and 418 families residing in the borough. The population density was 0.059 people per square mile (0.023 people/km^{2}). There were 1,557 housing units at an average density of 0.05 per square mile (0.019/km^{2}). The racial makeup of the borough was 18.76% White, 0.05% Black or African American, 73.51% Native American, 0.22% Asian, 0.16% Pacific Islander, 0.33% from other races, and 6.97% from two or more races. 1.15% of the population were Hispanic or Latino of any race. About 5.41% reported speaking a Yupik language at home, while 3.87% speak Alutiiq and 1.23% an Athabaskan language.

Some 44.70% of households had children under the age of 18 living with them, 48.50% were married couples living together, 9.70% had a female householder with no husband present, and 28.90% were non-families. About 24.70% of all households were made up of individuals, and 3.90% consisted of a sole occupant 65 years of age or older. The average household size was 3.10 and the average family size was 3.74.

In the borough, the age of the population was spread out, with 37.80% under the age of 18, 8.50% from 18 to 24, 28.00% from 25 to 44, 20.20% from 45 to 64, and 5.40% who were 65 years of age or older. The median age was 29 years. For every 100 females, there were 113.50 males. For every 100 females age 18 and over, there were 124.10 males.

=== Religion ===
The dominant religion is Orthodox Christianity.

== Government ==
The Borough is governed by an elected assembly. The Borough's mayor is Glen R. Alsworth, Sr. The deputy mayor is Myra J. Olsen. The other members of the assembly are Randy Alvarez, Scott Anderson, Alvin Pedersen, Michelle Pope-Ravenmoon, and Christina Salmon-Bringhurst.

Lake and Peninsula Borough is somewhat of a national bellwether, having only voted for the losing presidential candidate four times since statehood: in 1976, 1992, 2008, and 2016. It was the county or borough that swung the most towards Trump from 2020 to 2024 at 31.7%

United States presidential election results for Lake and Peninsula Borough, Alaska
Year	Republican		Democratic		Third party(ies)	
Year	No.	%	No.	%	No.	%
1960	121	36.45%	211	63.55%	0	0.00%
1964	82	18.72%	356	81.28%	0	0.00%
1968	195	44.72%	189	43.35%	52	11.93%
1972	180	48.91%	170	46.20%	18	4.89%
1976	212	58.08%	131	35.89%	22	6.03%
1980	225	54.09%	130	31.25%	61	14.66%
1984	446	78.94%	105	18.58%	14	2.48%
1988	342	67.06%	162	31.76%	6	1.18%
1992	291	48.26%	152	25.21%	160	26.53%
1996	235	44.76%	240	45.71%	50	9.52%
2000	297	57.34%	196	37.84%	25	4.83%
2004	224	65.88%	114	33.53%	2	0.59%
2008	299	59.56%	185	36.85%	18	3.59%
2012	143	39.29%	212	58.24%	9	2.47%
2016	174	43.28%	193	48.01%	35	8.71%
2020	234	36.34%	358	55.59%	52	8.07%
2024	230	52.04%	175	39.59%	37	8.37%

== Communities ==
Despite King Salmon being the borough seat, it is not in Lake and Peninsula Borough and instead in Bristol Bay Borough, therefore it is not included in the list.

=== Cities ===
- Chignik
- Egegik
- Newhalen
- Nondalton
- Pilot Point
- Port Heiden

=== Census-designated places ===
- Chignik Lagoon
- Chignik Lake
- Igiugig
- Iliamna
- Ivanof Bay
- Kokhanok
- Levelock
- Pedro Bay
- Perryville
- Pope-Vannoy Landing
- Port Alsworth
- Ugashik

=== Ghost town ===
- Kijik

=== Census Subareas ===
- Lake and Peninsula

== See also ==
- List of airports in the Lake and Peninsula Borough
