= Iliamna, Alaska =

Iliamna, Alaska Illiamna
- Census-designated place
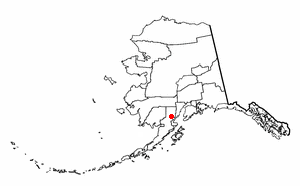
- Location of Iliamna, Alaska
- Coordinates: 59°45′54″N 154°50′25″W
- Country: United States
- State: Alaska
- Borough: Lake and Peninsula

Government
  - Borough mayor: Glen Alsworth, Sr.
  - State senator: Lyman Hoffman (D)
  - State rep.: Bryce Edgmon (I)

Area
  - Total: 37.69 sq mi (97.61 km^{2})
  - Land: 37.22 sq mi (96.39 km^{2})
  - Water: 0.47 sq mi (1.21 km^{2})
- Elevation: 155 ft (47 m)

Population (2020)
  - Total: 108
  - Density: 2.9/sq mi (1.12/km^{2})
- Time zone: UTC-9 (Alaska (AKST))
  - Summer (DST): UTC-8 (AKDT)
- ZIP codes: 99606, 99647
- Area code: 907
- FIPS code: 02-35120

Iliamna (Dena'ina: Illiamna) is a census-designated place (CDP) in Lake and Peninsula Borough, Alaska, United States. The population was 108 at the 2020 census, slightly down from 109 in 2010.

== History ==
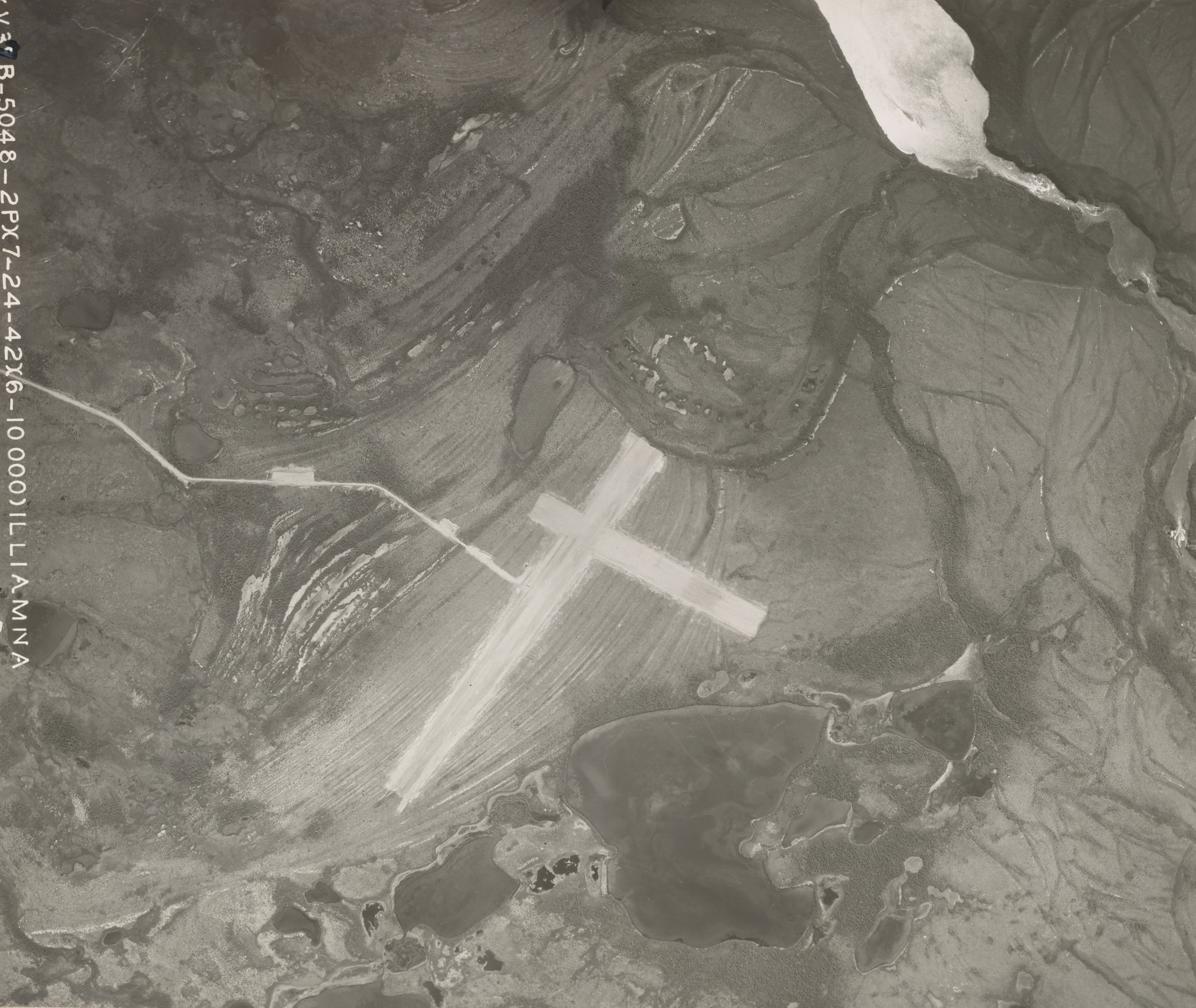
Iliamna Landing Field, 1942

Iliamna was originally the name of an Athabaskan village at the point where the Iliamna River flows into Iliamna Lake, about 35 miles (56 km) east of present-day Iliamna. That site is now called Old Iliamna (Dena'ina: Nuch'ak'dalitnu’). In 1935, the residents of Old Iliamna moved to the present-day location.

The first sport fishing lodge in Iliamna was built in the 1930s, and the second was built in the 1950s. Many more were built later in the 20th century. Iliamna's economy has two main elements: subsistence fishing and hunting and sport fishing lodges. Year-round residents largely pursue subsistence activities, while summer workers from other areas work in the lodges.

Around 1913, Herman Gartelmann, Jack Kinney, and Ed Ahola built a roadhouse here, taking advantage of air travel through Lake Clark Pass. Jack and Ed were from Old Iliamna village. Frederick Roehl purchased the roadhouse around 1917, and when he died in 1923, Hans Seversen took over and the facility became known as Seversen's Roadhouse. He started hosting big game hunters in 1921 and the first sport fishermen in 1937. Martin Seversen ran the operation from 1946 and put up a new building. Mary Seversen Clark sold the operation in 1956.

Iliamna faces the prospect of developing into a mining town, as several multi-national companies plan to develop the area northwest of the village into one of North America's largest gold-copper-molybdenum mines. The first company to submit plans to the State of Alaska is Northern Dynasty Minerals, a wholly owned subsidiary of Hunter Dickinson. The Lake and Peninsula Borough, the region's governing body, passed a strong resolution in support of the mine's development, but the majority of the surrounding villages adamantly oppose it. Two non-profit organizations are leading the fight against open-pit mining in the Bristol Bay watershed - the Bristol Bay Alliance and the Renewable Resources Coalition. A study concluded in 2006 indicated the majority of Alaskans were opposed to the development.

== Geography ==
Iliamna is located in southwest Alaska at 59°45′54″N 154°50′25″W (59.765135, -154.840312). It is bordered to the south by the city of Newhalen, to the west by the Newhalen River, and to the southeast by Iliamna Lake.

According to the United States Census Bureau, the CDP has a total area of 37.6 square miles (97.4 km^{2}), of which 37.1 square miles (96.2 km^{2}) are land and 0.46 square miles (1.2 km^{2}), or 1.23%, are water.

=== Climate ===
Climate chart for Iliamna

Iliamna has a subarctic climate (Köppen Dfc) with mild summers and freezing winters, though moderated by the Pacific Ocean. Iliamna's year-round average temperature is 37.7 °F (3.2 °C), with five months averaging below freezing and three months averaging above 50 °F (10 °C), July is the warmest month with an average temperature of 57.8 °F (14.3 °C) and January the coldest with an average of 18.4 °F (−7.6 °C). Winters are sometimes very cold, with low temperatures below −40 °F (−40 °C). Usually 32 days annually have minima 0 °F (−17.8 °C) or below, and the coldest temperature in a year will drop to −21 °F (−29.4 °C), so Iliamna falls in USDA Plant Hardiness Zones 4b. In the 1991 to 2020 normals the coldest day of the year averaged −11 °F (−23.9 °C), while the warmest night average was 57 °F (13.9 °C). The coldest daytime maximum on record is −33 °F (−36.1 °C) on January 19, 1947, while, conversely, the record warm daily minimum is 61 °F (16.1 °C) on August 13, 2019. Extreme temperatures have ranged from −47 °F (−43.9 °C) on January 22, 1947, up to 91 °F (32.8 °C) on June 27, 1953. The coldest month has been January 1947 and December 1942 with a mean temperature of −6.5 °F (−21.4 °C), while the warmest was July 2019 at 63.2 °F (17.3 °C); the annual mean temperature has ranged from 28.2 °F (−2.1 °C) in 1956 to 42.1 °F (5.6 °C) in 2019.

Iliamna receives 25.01 inches (635 mm) of annual precipitation, mostly between summer and fall. September 1961 was the wettest month, with 11.02 inches (280 mm) of precipitation, and there were many months with only a trace of precipitation. The wettest calendar year was 1985 with 40.79 inches (1,036.1 mm) of precipitation, while the driest was 1968 with 15.33 inches (389.4 mm).

Climate data for Iliamna Airport, Alaska (1991–2020 normals, extremes 1920–present (Note: Temperatures have been recorded at Iliamna Airport since April 1920, with there being periods of no recording from March 1923 to March 1941 and from December 1973 until June 1975.))
| Month | Jan | Feb | Mar | Apr | May | Jun | Jul | Aug | Sep | Oct | Nov | Dec | Year |
|---|---|---|---|---|---|---|---|---|---|---|---|---|---|
| Record high °F (°C) | 57 (14) | 50 (10) | 52 (11) | 67 (19) | 80 (27) | 91 (33) | 86 (30) | 83 (28) | 75 (24) | 66 (19) | 52 (11) | 49 (9) | 91 (33) |
| Mean maximum °F (°C) | 42.4 (5.8) | 42.6 (5.9) | 43.5 (6.4) | 54.2 (12.3) | 67.6 (19.8) | 74.3 (23.5) | 76.8 (24.9) | 73.4 (23.0) | 64.1 (17.8) | 54.4 (12.4) | 45.7 (7.6) | 43.2 (6.2) | 78.8 (26.0) |
| Mean daily maximum °F (°C) | 24.8 (−4.0) | 29.9 (−1.2) | 31.7 (−0.2) | 43.3 (6.3) | 54.7 (12.6) | 62.0 (16.7) | 64.9 (18.3) | 63.5 (17.5) | 56.0 (13.3) | 44.6 (7.0) | 33.2 (0.7) | 28.0 (−2.2) | 44.7 (7.1) |
| Daily mean °F (°C) | 18.4 (−7.6) | 23.1 (−4.9) | 23.7 (−4.6) | 36.1 (2.3) | 46.3 (7.9) | 53.7 (12.1) | 57.8 (14.3) | 56.7 (13.7) | 49.7 (9.8) | 38.4 (3.6) | 27.1 (−2.7) | 21.7 (−5.7) | 37.7 (3.2) |
| Mean daily minimum °F (°C) | 11.9 (−11.2) | 16.3 (−8.7) | 15.7 (−9.1) | 28.8 (−1.8) | 37.9 (3.3) | 45.4 (7.4) | 50.7 (10.4) | 49.9 (9.9) | 43.3 (6.3) | 32.3 (0.2) | 21.0 (−6.1) | 15.3 (−9.3) | 30.7 (−0.7) |
| Mean minimum °F (°C) | −16.9 (−27.2) | −11.0 (−23.9) | −6.7 (−21.5) | 10.1 (−12.2) | 28.3 (−2.1) | 36.4 (2.4) | 43.4 (6.3) | 39.8 (4.3) | 30.6 (−0.8) | 16.0 (−8.9) | −0.6 (−18.1) | −9.6 (−23.1) | −21.0 (−29.4) |
| Record low °F (°C) | −47 (−44) | −46 (−43) | −30 (−34) | −30 (−34) | 4 (−16) | 28 (−2) | 30 (−1) | 22 (−6) | 20 (−7) | −4 (−20) | −20 (−29) | −31 (−35) | −47 (−44) |
| Average precipitation inches (mm) | 0.90 (23) | 1.06 (27) | 0.84 (21) | 0.83 (21) | 1.19 (30) | 1.51 (38) | 3.08 (78) | 4.14 (105) | 5.01 (127) | 2.84 (72) | 2.16 (55) | 1.45 (37) | 25.01 (635) |
| Average precipitation days (≥ 0.01 in) | 7.7 | 8.7 | 7.5 | 8.0 | 8.9 | 9.5 | 13.5 | 15.9 | 16.2 | 13.3 | 11.8 | 10.7 | 131.6 |
| Average dew point °F (°C) | 10.0 (−12.2) | 16.8 (−8.4) | 13.3 (−10.4) | 25.1 (−3.8) | 33.7 (0.9) | 42.3 (5.7) | 48.6 (9.2) | 48.3 (9.1) | 40.9 (4.9) | 29.9 (−1.2) | 18.4 (−7.6) | 13.4 (−10.3) | 28.4 (−2.0) |
Source 1: NOAA / National Weather Service
Source 2: Western Regional Climate Center (dew point 1998–2011)

== Demographics ==
Historical population
| Census | Pop. | Note | %± |
|---|---|---|---|
| 1940 | 30 | | — |
| 1950 | 44 | | 46.7% |
| 1960 | 47 | | 6.8% |
| 1970 | 58 | | 23.4% |
| 1980 | 94 | | 62.1% |
| 1990 | 94 | | 0.0% |
| 2000 | 102 | | 8.5% |
| 2010 | 109 | | 6.9% |
| 2020 | 108 | | −0.9% |
U.S. Decennial Census

The current Iliamna first appeared on the 1940 U.S. Census as an unincorporated village. It was made a census-designated place (CDP) in 1980. Prior to 1940, the Iliamna listed on the census was for the former village of (Old) Iliamna, located on the east side of the lake, which is no longer in existence.

As of the census of 2000, there were 102 people, 35 households, and 26 families residing in the CDP. The population density was 2.8 inhabitants per square mile (1.1/km^{2}). There were 58 housing units at an average density of 1.6 units per square mile (0.62 units/km^{2}). The racial makeup of the CDP was 39.22% White, 50.00% Native American, and 10.78% from two or more races.

There were 35 households, out of which 45.7% had children under the age of 18 living with them, 62.9% were married couples living together, 5.7% had a female householder with no husband present, and 25.7% were non-families. 20.0% of all households were made up of individuals, and 2.9% had someone living alone who was 65 years of age or older. The average household size was 2.91 and the average family size was 3.42.

In the CDP, the population was spread out, with 34.3% under the age of 18, 6.9% from 18 to 24, 28.4% from 25 to 44, 28.4% from 45 to 64, and 2.0% who were 65 years of age or older. The median age was 32 years. For every 100 females, there were 112.5 males. For every 100 females age 18 and over, there were 103.0 males.

The median income for a household in the CDP was $60,625, and the median income for a family was $61,250. Males had a median income of $38,333 versus $36,667 for females. The per capita income for the CDP was $19,741. There were no families and 3.1% of the population living below the poverty line, including no under eighteens and none of those over 64.
