= Politics of Alaska =

Federal presidential vote in Alaska, 1960-2020

Since the 1970s, the political climate of the state of Alaska has favored the Republican Party, with a libertarian streak. Local political communities have often worked on issues related to land use development, fishing, tourism, and individual rights. Alaska Natives, while organized in and around their communities, have been active within the Native corporations. These have been given ownership over large tracts of land, which require stewardship. The state has an independence movement favoring a vote on secession from the United States, with the Alaskan Independence Party, but its membership has shrunk in recent decades (to 18,725 as of 2022).

Alaska regularly supports Republicans in presidential elections and has done so since statehood. Republicans have won the state's electoral college votes in every election except Democrat Lyndon B. Johnson's 1964 landslide. No state has voted for a Democratic presidential candidate fewer times. The 1960 and 1968 elections were close, but from 1972 onward, Republicans have consistently carried the state by large margins. Democratic candidates managed to receive over 40% of the vote in 2012, 2020 and 2024, but still were defeated by double-digit margins.

The communities of Juneau, Sitka, downtown and midtown Anchorage, the areas surrounding the college/University of Alaska Fairbanks campus and Ester and the "Alaska Bush" – rural, sparsely populated Alaska – stand out as Democratic strongholds, while the Kenai Peninsula, Matanuska-Susitna Valley, parts of Anchorage, and Fairbanks (including North Pole and Eielson Air Force Base), Ketchikan, Wrangell, and Petersburg serve as the Republican Party electoral base. Over half of all registered voters have chosen "Non-Partisan" or "Undeclared" as their affiliation.

== State politics ==
The Alaska Legislature consists of a 20-member Senate serving 4-year terms and a 40-member House of Representatives serving 2-year terms. Since 1994, it has been dominated by conservatives, generally Republicans, however, coalition governments are common, and both chambers are currently governed by one. Likewise, recent state governors have been mostly conservatives, although not always elected under the Republican Party banner. Six Republicans and four Democrats have served as governor of Alaska. In addition, Republican governor Wally Hickel was elected to the office for a second term in 1990 after leaving the Republican party and briefly joining the Alaskan Independence Party ticket just long enough to be reelected. He officially rejoined the Republican party in 1994. Independent Bill Walker also served as Governor after winning the 2014 election.

Recent and ongoing U.S. Justice Department probes continue into Alaskan politics. Ted Stevens, who had served since 1968, was caught up in a larger probe that included Federal Bureau of Investigation raids in the summer of 2007 at the offices of six Alaska legislators, including Stevens' son, Ben, who was then the president of the state Senate, and a raid on Senator Ted Stevens' personal home. Stevens drew the FBI and Justice Department attention over his home renovation project done in 2000, which more than doubled the size of his home. Bill Allen, founder of VECO Corporation, an oil supplying and engineering company, oversaw the work at Senator Steven's home. Bill Allen has since pleaded guilty to bribing Alaska state legislators. Alaska lawmakers went as far as embroidering ball caps with the letters CBC, for "Corrupt Bastards Club". The Washington Post describes more into the political scandals with its article entitled "I'll sell my soul to the Devil" from a tape quote from Pete Kott, former Republican speaker of the Alaskan legislature. On October 27, 2008, Stevens was convicted on seven counts of making false statements. His conviction was reversed, six months after he lost the election to the Democrat, because of misconduct by prosecutors, which included withholding and falsifying evidence.

== Federal politics ==
United States presidential election results for Alaska
Year	Republican		Democratic		Third party(ies)	
Year	No.	%	No.	%	No.	%
1960	30,953	50.94%	29,809	49.06%	0	0.00%
1964	22,930	34.09%	44,329	65.91%	0	0.00%
1968	37,600	45.28%	35,411	42.65%	10,024	12.07%
1972	55,349	58.13%	32,967	34.62%	6,903	7.25%
1976	71,555	57.90%	44,058	35.65%	7,961	6.44%
1980	86,112	54.35%	41,842	26.41%	30,491	19.24%
1984	138,377	66.65%	62,007	29.87%	7,221	3.48%
1988	119,251	59.59%	72,584	36.27%	8,281	4.14%
1992	102,000	39.46%	78,294	30.29%	78,212	30.26%
1996	122,746	50.80%	80,380	33.27%	38,494	15.93%
2000	167,398	58.62%	79,004	27.67%	39,158	13.71%
2004	190,889	61.07%	111,025	35.52%	10,684	3.42%
2008	193,841	59.42%	123,594	37.89%	8,762	2.69%
2012	164,676	54.80%	122,640	40.81%	13,179	4.39%
2016	163,387	51.28%	116,454	36.55%	38,767	12.17%
2020	189,951	52.83%	153,778	42.77%	15,801	4.39%
2024	184,458	54.54%	140,026	41.41%	13,693	4.05%

Alaska's current delegation to the United States Congress consists of two Republican Senators and one Republican member of the U.S. House of Representatives.

Because of its population relative to other U.S. states, Alaska has only one member in the U.S. House of Representatives. Its sole congressional district is currently the world's second-largest legislative constituency by area, behind only the Canadian territory of Nunavut. The seat was left vacant following the death of Republican Don Young in March 2022. Later that year, Democrat Mary Peltola was elected to serve the remainder of Young's term, becoming the first Democrat to win the seat since 1972, and the first Alaskan Native to be elected to the United States Congress in history. After winning election to a full term in the 2022 general election, Peltola lost reelection in 2024 to Republican Nick Begich III.

Representative Young was in his 25th consecutive House term at the time of his death, and his seniority made him an influential Republican House member. His position on the House Transportation Committee allowed him to parlay some $450 million to the proposed Knik Arm Bridge and the proposed Gravina Island Bridge which was derided as a "bridge to nowhere". As a result, Congress removed the federal earmark for the bridge in 2005.

Republicans Dan Sullivan and Lisa Murkowski represent Alaska in the United States Senate. Sullivan has held the state's Class 2 Senate seat since 2015, and Murkowski has held its Class 3 seat since 2002. Notably, Murkowski was re-elected in 2010 in a write-in campaign, after losing the Republican primary to Tea Party-backed challenger Joe Miller. The campaign made national headlines, and Murkowski became the first Senator to be elected in a write-in campaign since Strom Thurmond of South Carolina in 1954.

Alaska is part of the United States District Court for the District of Alaska in the federal judiciary. The district's cases are appealed to the San Francisco-based United States Court of Appeals for the Ninth Circuit.

== Parties and registration ==
=== Recognized political parties ===
- Alaska Democratic Party
- Alaska Republican Party
- Libertarian Party of Alaska

=== Formerly recognized parties ===
- Alaskan Independence Party

As of April 2026, a majority of voters in every state house district have registered their partisan affiliation as either Nonpartisan or Undeclared. In terms of registration with actual political parties, Republicans outnumbered Democrats in 33 of 40 districts, with Democrats leading in District 4 in Juneau, Districts 14, 17, and 19 in Northern Anchorage, and Districts 38, 39, 40 in northwestern Alaska.

Party registration (as of September 2026)
Group			Registered Voters	Percentage
Name		Class	Registered Voters	Percentage
D	Alaska Democratic Party	Party	69,894	11.59%
L	Alaska Libertarian Party	Party	6,067	1.01%
R	Alaska Republican Party	Party	142,814	23.57%
C	Alaska Constitution Party	Group	767	0.13%
G	Green Party of Alaska	Group	1,446	0.24%
I	Reform APF Dividend Party	Group	36	0.0060%
J	Prohibition Party	Group	2	0.00033%
M	Conservative Party USA	Group	85	0.014%
S	Alaskan Party	Group	44	0.0073%
V	Veterans Party of Alaska	Group	1,462	0.24%
W	UCES' Clown Party	Group	258	0.043%
Y	The Future Generation Party	Group	5	0.00082%
Z	American Party of Alaska	Group	5	0.00082%
N	Nonpartisan	Other	82,002	13.59%
U	Undeclared	Other	299,022	49.56%

== Unique features ==
Alaska was formerly the only state in which possession of thirty ounces or less of marijuana in one's home was completely legal under state law, though the federal law remains in force. Alaska's appeals court ruled in 2003 that Alaska's constitutional guarantee of privacy took precedence over any attempts at marijuana prohibition, overruling a 1990 voter initiative that criminalized possession of all amounts of the drug. The court ruled that voters, who approved the criminalization measure, did not have authority to change the state constitution protecting one's privacy.

Alaska is also unusual in that it does not have counties. Instead, it is divided into boroughs in some of the more populated areas, but nearly half the state is in the Unorganized Borough and has no local government or services other than town or village councils. The Unorganized Borough, however, does include some major population centers such as Nome and Bethel.

== See also ==
- Government of Alaska
- Political party strength in Alaska
