= List of states by participation in United States presidential elections =

Following is a list of states by participation in United States presidential elections:

State	Elections	Winner (Note: Based on the majority vote and majority designation of electors in elections where the state awarded electors to multiple candidates.)	Loser	Percent	Democrat	Republican	Whig	Democratic-Republican	Federalist	Other	Notes
Alabama	50	28	22	56%	29	17	1	1	0	2 (Note: Wallace, 1968.) (Note: Thurmond, 1948.)	
Alaska	16	9	7	56.25%	1	15	n/a	n/a	n/a	0	
Arizona	28	22	6	78.57%	9	19	n/a	n/a	n/a	0	
Arkansas	47	27	20	57.45%	32	14	0	0	0	0	
California	43	35	8	81.4%	18	24	0	0	0	1 (Note: T. Roosevelt, 1912.)	
Colorado	37	27	10	72.97%	16	20	n/a	n/a	n/a	1 (Note: Weaver, 1892.)	
Connecticut	59	40	19	67.8%	20	24	3	4	6	2 (Note: Washington, 1788-89, 1792.)	
Delaware	59	36	22	61.02%	23	20	4	4	6	2	
Florida	43	31	12	72.09%	25	17	1	0	0	0	
Georgia	58	34	24	58.62%	32	12	3	8	0	3	
Hawaii	16	10	6	62.5%	14	2	n/a	n/a	n/a	0	
Idaho	33	23	10	69.7%	10	32	n/a	n/a	n/a	1	
Illinois	51	42	9	82.35%	26	23	0	2	0	0	
Indiana	52	38	14	73.08%	14	34	2	2	0	0	
Iowa	44	32	12	72.73%	14	30	0	0	0	0	
Kansas	40	27	13	67.5%	8	31	n/a	n/a	n/a	1	
Kentucky	58	36	22	62.07%	25	17	5	9	0	2 (Note: Bell, 1860.) (Note: Washington, 1792.)	
Louisiana	52	33	19	63.46%	32	13	2	3	0	2	
Maine	51	34	17	66.67%	18	30	1	2	0	0	
Maryland	59	38	21	64.41%	26	16	5	8	1	3 (Note: Fillmore, 1856.)	
Massachusetts	59	39	20	66.1%	22	20	5	5	5	2	
Michigan	47	35	12	74.47%	20	25	1	0	0	1	
Minnesota	41	30	11	73.17%	21	19	n/a	n/a	n/a	1	
Mississippi	49	25	24	51.02%	29	15	1	1	0	3 (Note: Byrd, 1960.)	
Missouri	51	37	14	72.55%	29	20	0	2	0	0	
Montana	33	24	9	72.73%	11	22	n/a	n/a	n/a	0	
Nebraska	39	25	14	64.1%	8	31	n/a	n/a	n/a	0	
Nevada	40	32	8	80%	19	20	n/a	n/a	n/a	1	
New Hampshire	59	44	15	74.58%	20	28	0	5	4	2	
New Jersey	59	42	17	71.19%	26	19	4	5	3	2	
New Mexico	28	25	3	89.29%	14	14	n/a	n/a	n/a	0	
New York	58	47	11	81.03%	25	21	2	7	1	1	
North Carolina	57	38	19	66.67%	30	16	3	7	0	1	
North Dakota	33	22	11	66.67%	5	27	n/a	n/a	n/a	1	
Ohio	55	45	10	81.82%	17	29	3	6	0	0	
Oklahoma	29	20	8	68.97%	8	21	n/a	n/a	n/a	0	
Oregon	41	30	11	73.17%	17	24	n/a	n/a	n/a	0	
Pennsylvania	59	48	11	81.36%	22	25	2	6	1	3	
Rhode Island	58	41	17	70.69%	24	20	4	5	4	1	
South Carolina	58	33	25	56.9%	30	16	2	7	0	4 (Note: Floyd, 1832.)	
South Dakota	33	19	14	57.58%	4	28	n/a	n/a	n/a	1	
Tennessee	56	37	19	66.07%	25	18	5	7	0	1	
Texas	42	24	18	57.14%	26	16	0	0	0	0	
Utah	32	23	9	71.88%	8	24	n/a	n/a	n/a	0	
Vermont	58	37	21	63.79%	10	32	5	7	2	2 (Note: Wirt, 1832.)	
Virginia	57	38	19	66.67%	30	16	0	8	0	3	
Washington	33	23	10	69.7%	18	14	n/a	n/a	n/a	1	
Washington, D.C.	15	7	8	46.67%	15	0	n/a	n/a	n/a	0	
West Virginia	40	29	11	72.5%	19	21	n/a	n/a	n/a	0	
Wisconsin	44	34	10	77.27%	18	25	0	0	0	1 (Note: La Follette, 1924.)	
Wyoming	33	23	10	69.7%	8	25	n/a	n/a	n/a	0	

== See also ==
- List of United States presidential election results by state
- List of highest presidential election vote totals by U.S. state
