= List of highest presidential election vote totals by U.S. state =

Following is a list of highest presidential election vote totals by U.S. state. These are the largest absolute numbers of popular votes received by an individual candidate for President of the United States in a single presidential election in each of the 50 U.S. states and the District of Columbia.

Votes received by a candidate on multiple party ballot lines are counted together, and the national winner designation refers to the outcome of the presidential election as a whole, rather than any individual state.

The highest vote totals have generally occurred in more recent elections, reflecting increasing population and voter participation. As of 2026, of the 51 jurisdictions participating in United States elections, 25 established their records in the 2020 election, 24 in the 2024 election, and two in the 2008 election, these being John McCain in Alaska and Barack Obama in Michigan.

State	Candidate	Vote total	Year	Party	Nat'l winner	References
Alabama	Donald Trump	1,462,616	2024	Republican	Y	
Alaska	John McCain	193,841	2008	Republican	N	
Arizona	Donald Trump	1,770,242	2024	Republican	Y	
Arkansas	Donald Trump	760,647	2020	Republican	N	
California	Joe Biden	11,110,250	2020	Democratic	Y	
Colorado	Joe Biden	1,804,352	2020	Democratic	Y	
Connecticut	Joe Biden	1,080,831	2020	Democratic	Y	
Delaware	Joe Biden	296,268	2020	Democratic	Y	
District of Columbia	Joe Biden	317,323	2020	Democratic	Y	
Florida	Donald Trump	6,110,125	2024	Republican	Y	
Georgia	Donald Trump	2,663,117	2024	Republican	Y	
Hawaii	Joe Biden	366,130	2020	Democratic	Y	
Idaho	Donald Trump	605,246	2024	Republican	Y	
Illinois	Joe Biden	3,471,915	2020	Democratic	Y	
Indiana	Donald Trump	1,729,519	2020	Republican	N	
Iowa	Donald Trump	927,019	2024	Republican	Y	
Kansas	Donald Trump	771,406	2020	Republican	N	
Kentucky	Donald Trump	1,337,494	2024	Republican	Y	
Louisiana	Donald Trump	1,255,776	2020	Republican	N	
Maine	Kamala Harris	435,652	2024	Democratic	N	
Maryland	Joe Biden	1,985,023	2020	Democratic	Y	
Massachusetts	Joe Biden	2,382,202	2020	Democratic	Y	
Michigan	Barack Obama	2,872,579	2008	Democratic	Y	
Minnesota	Joe Biden	1,717,077	2020	Democratic	Y	
Mississippi	Donald Trump	756,764	2020	Republican	N	
Missouri	Donald Trump	1,751,986	2024	Republican	Y	
Montana	Donald Trump	352,079	2024	Republican	Y	
Nebraska	Donald Trump	564,816	2024	Republican	Y	
Nevada	Donald Trump	751,205	2024	Republican	Y	
New Hampshire	Joe Biden	424,937	2020	Democratic	Y	
New Jersey	Joe Biden	2,608,335	2020	Democratic	Y	
New Mexico	Joe Biden	501,614	2020	Democratic	Y	
New York	Joe Biden	5,230,985	2020	Democratic	Y	
North Carolina	Donald Trump	2,898,423	2024	Republican	Y	
North Dakota	Donald Trump	246,505	2024	Republican	Y	
Ohio	Donald Trump	3,180,116	2024	Republican	Y	
Oklahoma	Donald Trump	1,036,213	2024	Republican	Y	
Oregon	Joe Biden	1,340,383	2020	Democratic	Y	
Pennsylvania	Donald Trump	3,543,308	2024	Republican	Y	
Rhode Island	Joe Biden	307,486	2020	Democratic	Y	
South Carolina	Donald Trump	1,483,747	2024	Republican	Y	
South Dakota	Donald Trump	272,081	2024	Republican	Y	
Tennessee	Donald Trump	1,966,865	2024	Republican	Y	
Texas	Donald Trump	6,393,597	2024	Republican	Y	
Utah	Donald Trump	883,818	2024	Republican	Y	
Vermont	Joe Biden	242,820	2020	Democratic	Y	
Virginia	Joe Biden	2,413,568	2020	Democratic	Y	
Washington	Joe Biden	2,369,612	2020	Democratic	Y	
West Virginia	Donald Trump	545,382	2020	Republican	N	
Wisconsin	Donald Trump	1,697,626	2024	Republican	Y	
Wyoming	Donald Trump	193,559	2020	Republican	N	

== See also ==
- List of United States presidential election results by state
- List of states by participation in United States presidential elections
- List of United States presidential elections by popular vote margin
- List of United States presidential candidates by number of votes received
- List of United States presidential elections by Electoral College margin
- List of United States presidential elections in which the winner lost the popular vote
- National Popular Vote Interstate Compact
