= 2004 United States presidential election in Alaska =

- November 2, 2004

Nominee	George W. Bush	John Kerry
Party	Republican	Democratic
Home state	Texas	Massachusetts
Running mate	Dick Cheney	John Edwards
Electoral vote	3	0
Popular vote	190,889	111,025
Percentage	61.07%	35.52%

Bush
40–50%
50–60%
60–70%
70–80%
Kerry
40–50%
50–60%
President before election
George W. Bush
Republican
Elected President
George W. Bush
Republican

The 2004 United States presidential election in Alaska took place on November 2, 2004, and was part of the 2004 United States presidential election. Voters chose 3 representatives, or electors to the Electoral College, who voted for president and vice president.

Alaska was won by incumbent President George W. Bush by a 25.6% margin of victory. Prior to the election, all leading news organizations considered this a state Bush would win, or otherwise considered as a safe red state. It has voted for a Republican presidential nominee in every presidential election since statehood, except for 1964. As of the 2024 presidential election, this is the most recent time a presidential candidate has received over 60% of the vote in Alaska, as well as the last time that Bethel, Kusilvak, Yakutat, and Nome Census Areas voted for the Republican candidate.

== Primaries ==
- 2004 Alaska Democratic presidential primary

== Campaign ==
=== Predictions ===
There were 12 news organizations who made state-by-state predictions of the election. Here are their last predictions before election day.

Source	Ranking
D.C. Political Report	Solid R
Associated Press	Solid R
CNN	Likely R
Cook Political Report	Solid R
Newsweek	Solid R
New York Times	Solid R
Rasmussen Reports	Likely R
Research 2000	Solid R
Washington Post	Likely R
Washington Times	Solid R
Zogby International	Likely R
Washington Dispatch	Likely R

=== Polling ===
Only one pre-election poll was conducted in this state. Bush won the poll with 57% to 30%.

=== Fundraising ===
Bush raised $263,269. Kerry raised $169,533.

=== Advertising and visits ===
Neither campaign advertised or visited this state during the fall campaign.

== Analysis ==
The Democratic presidential ticket did better here in 2004 compared to 2000, narrowing the Republican advantage from around 31 percentage points in 2000 to approximately 25 percentage points in 2004. John Kerry obtained nearly 36 percent of the vote, approximately 8 percentage points (or 32,021 votes) more than Al Gore's showing of around 28 percent in 2000. In comparison, incumbent President George W. Bush only increased his vote in Alaska by around 2 percent (or 23,491 votes) from nearly 59 percent in 2000 to approximately 61 percent in 2004.

== Results ==
2004 United States presidential election in Alaska
Party	Candidate	Votes	Percentage	Electoral votes
Republican	George W. Bush (incumbent)	190,889	61.07%	3
Democratic	John Kerry	111,025	35.52%	0
Independent	Ralph Nader	5,069	1.62%	0
Alaska Independence	Michael Peroutka	2,092	0.67%	0
Libertarian	Michael Badnarik	1,675	0.54%	0
Green	David Cobb	1,058	0.34%	0
Independent	Write-ins	790	0.25%	0
Totals		312,598	100.00%	3
Voter turnout (Voting age)				68%

Boroughs and census areas that flipped from Republican to Democratic

- Juneau
- Sitka
- Skagway
- Hoonah–Angoon Census Area (largest town: Hoonah)

Boroughs and census areas that flipped from Democratic to Republican

- Bethel Census Area (largest town: Bethel)

=== By congressional district ===
Due to the state's low population, only one congressional district is allocated. This district, an at-large district because it covers the entire state, is thus equivalent to the statewide election results.

District	Bush	Kerry	Representative
At-large	61.1%	35.5%	Don Young

== Electors ==
Technically the voters of Alaska cast their ballots for electors: representatives to the Electoral College. Alaska is allocated 3 electors because it has 1 congressional districts and 2 senators. All candidates who appear on the ballot or qualify to receive write-in votes must submit a list of 3 electors, who pledge to vote for their candidate and their running mate. Whoever wins the majority of votes in the state is awarded all 3 electoral votes. Their chosen electors then vote for president and vice president. Although electors are pledged to their candidate and running mate, they are not obligated to vote for them. An elector who votes for someone other than their candidate is known as a faithless elector.

The electors of each state and the District of Columbia met on December 13, 2004, to cast their votes for president and vice president. The Electoral College itself never meets as one body. Instead the electors from each state and the District of Columbia met in their respective capitols.

The following were the members of the Electoral College from the state. All were pledged to and voted for George W. Bush and Dick Cheney.

1. Gloria J. Tokar
2. Frederick H. Hahn
3. Roberly R. Waldron

== See also ==
- United States presidential elections in Alaska
