= 1972 United States presidential election in Alaska =

- November 7, 1972

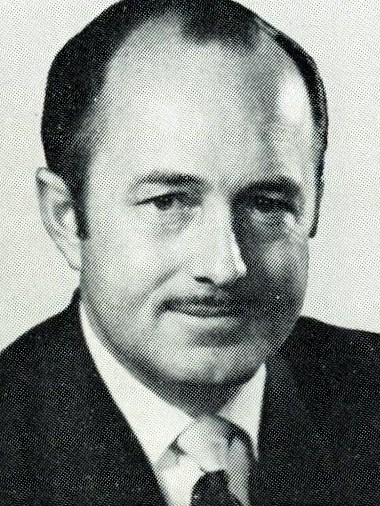
Nominee	Richard Nixon	George McGovern	John G. Schmitz
Party	Republican	Democratic	American Independent
Home state	California	South Dakota	California
Running mate	Spiro Agnew	Sargent Shriver	Thomas J. Anderson
Electoral vote	3	0	0
Popular vote	55,349	32,967	6,903
Percentage	58.10%	34.61%	7.25%

Nixon
40–50%
50–60%
60–70%
McGovern
40–50%
50–60%
60–70%
President before election
Richard Nixon
Republican
Elected President
Richard Nixon
Republican

The 1972 United States presidential election in Alaska took place on November 7, 1972, as part of the 1972 United States presidential election. Voters chose three representatives, or electors to the Electoral College, who voted for president and vice president.

Alaska was won by incumbent President Richard Nixon (R-California) with 58.1% of the popular vote against George McGovern (D-South Dakota) with 34.6%. Nixon ultimately won the national vote as well, defeating McGovern and Representative John G. Schmitz (R-California), who ran under the American Independent Party ticket.

== Results ==
1972 United States presidential election in Alaska
Party	Candidate	Votes	Percentage	Electoral votes
Republican	Richard Nixon (incumbent)	55,349	58.10%	3
Democratic	George McGovern	32,967	34.61%	0
American Independent	John G. Schmitz	6,903	7.25%	0
Libertarian	John Hospers (write-in)	45	0.05%	0
Totals		95,264	100.00%	3

=== By borough ===
Borough	Richard Nixon Republican		George McGovern Democratic		John G. Schmitz American Independent		Margin		Total votes cast
Borough	#	%	#	%	#	%	#	%	Total votes cast
Aleutians East	181	65.34%	86	31.05%	10	3.61%	95	34.29%	277
Aleutians West	371	64.97%	177	31.00%	23	4.03%	194	33.97%	571
Anchorage	23,968	63.32%	10,944	28.91%	2,941	7.77%	13,024	34.41%	37,853
Bethel	1,033	40.57%	1,426	56.01%	87	3.42%	-393	-15.44%	2,546
Bristol Bay	167	57.00%	112	38.23%	14	4.77%	55	18.77%	293
Denali	370	60.76%	196	32.18%	43	7.06%	174	28.58%	609
Dillingham	365	51.63%	312	44.13%	30	4.24%	53	7.50%	707
Fairbanks North Star	7,706	53.70%	5,539	38.60%	1,106	7.70%	2,167	15.10%	14,351
Haines	335	69.79%	122	25.42%	23	4.79%	213	44.37%	480
Hoonah-Angoon	300	45.25%	346	52.19%	17	2.56%	-46	-6.94%	663
Juneau	3,678	56.00%	2,725	41.49%	165	2.51%	953	14.51%	6,568
Kenai Peninsula	3,213	57.48%	1,518	27.16%	859	15.36%	1,695	30.32%	5,590
Ketchikan Gateway	2,263	58.40%	1,364	35.20%	248	6.40%	899	23.20%	3,875
Kodiak Island	1,173	56.12%	858	41.05%	59	2.83%	315	15.07%	2,090
Kusilvak	429	43.06%	525	52.66%	43	4.28%	-96	-9.60%	997
Lake and Peninsula	180	48.91%	170	46.20%	18	4.89%	10	2.71%	368
Matanuska-Susitna	2,003	66.66%	693	23.06%	309	10.28%	1,310	43.60%	3,005
Nome	911	49.48%	812	44.11%	118	6.41%	99	5.37%	1,841
North Slope	325	35.10%	560	60.48%	41	4.42%	-235	-25.38%	926
Northwest Arctic	744	56.49%	551	41.84%	22	1.67%	193	14.65%	1,317
Petersburg	506	63.09%	254	31.67%	42	5.24%	252	31.42%	802
Prince of Wales-Hyder	632	50.28%	562	44.71%	63	5.01%	70	5.57%	1,257
Sitka	1,280	52.61%	1,080	44.39%	73	3.00%	200	8.22%	2,433
Skagway	236	68.01%	90	25.94%	21	6.05%	146	42.07%	347
Southeast Fairbanks	562	59.28%	278	29.32%	108	11.40%	284	29.96%	948
Valdez-Cordova	1,075	56.31%	561	29.39%	273	14.30%	514	26.92%	1,909
Wrangell	422	59.02%	255	35.66%	38	5.32%	167	23.36%	715
Yakutat	88	57.89%	58	38.16%	6	3.95%	30	19.73%	152
Yukon-Koyukuk	835	48.29%	797	46.10%	97	5.61%	38	2.19%	1,729
Totals	55,349	58.13%	32,967	34.62%	6,903	7.25%	22,382	23.51%	95,219

== Analysis ==
Although Alaska has only voted Democratic once, which was for Lyndon B. Johnson in 1964, during the state's first four presidential elections Alaska was not substantially more Republican than the nation at-large: indeed owing to a fairly strong third-party campaign Nixon won 2.57 percent less of the vote in Alaska than over the entire country, although McGovern received 2.88 percent less than his national share.

While Alaska would prove to be John Schmitz's second strongest state after Idaho, he failed to equal the success of George Wallace’s campaign in the previous election.

== See also ==
- United States presidential elections in Alaska
