= 1984 United States presidential election in Alaska =

- November 6, 1984

Nominee	Ronald Reagan	Walter Mondale
Party	Republican	Democratic
Home state	California	Minnesota
Running mate	George H. W. Bush	Geraldine Ferraro
Electoral vote	3	0
Popular vote	138,377	62,007
Percentage	66.65%	29.87%

Reagan
50–60%
60–70%
70–80%
80–90%
Mondale
40–50%
President before election
Ronald Reagan
Republican
Elected President
Ronald Reagan
Republican

The 1984 United States presidential election in Alaska took place on November 6, 1984, as part of the nationwide presidential election. Voters chose three representatives, or electors to the Electoral College, who voted for president and vice president.

Alaska was won by incumbent President Ronald Reagan (R-California) with almost two-thirds of the popular vote against Walter Mondale (D-Minnesota) with 29.9%. Reagan ultimately won the national vote, winning re-election. Alaska has only voted Democratic once, in 1964 for Lyndon B. Johnson. Libertarian candidate David Bergland also had his best performance in this state, but did not receive nearly as much support as Ed Clark did in the previous election four years earlier.

This was the first election since 1964 that a single third party failed to garner 5% of the vote, as had been done by George Wallace in 1968, John G. Schmitz in 1972, Roger MacBride in 1976, and Ed Clark and John B. Anderson in 1980. This is the best performance by a Republican, and a candidate of any party, in a presidential election in the state's history.

== Results ==
1984 United States presidential election in Alaska
Party	Candidate	Votes	Percentage	Electoral votes
Republican	Ronald Reagan (incumbent)	138,377	66.65%	3
Democratic	Walter Mondale	62,007	29.87%	0
Libertarian	David Bergland	6,378	3.07%	0
N/A	Write-in	843	0.41%	0
Totals		207,605	100.00%	3

=== By borough ===
Borough	Ronald Reagan Republican		Walter Mondale Democratic		Various candidates Other parties		Margin		Total votes cast
Borough	#	%	#	%	#	%	#	%	Total votes cast
Aleutians East	367	72.96%	121	24.06%	15	2.98%	246	48.90%	503
Aleutians West	850	65.99%	413	32.07%	25	1.94%	437	33.92%	1,288
Anchorage	60,987	68.70%	25,158	28.34%	2,623	2.96%	35,829	40.36%	88,768
Bethel	2,402	51.49%	2,104	45.10%	159	3.41%	298	6.39%	4,665
Bristol Bay	359	70.81%	129	25.44%	19	3.75%	230	45.37%	507
Denali	632	69.53%	225	24.75%	52	5.72%	407	44.78%	909
Dillingham	1,055	66.98%	461	29.27%	59	3.75%	594	37.71%	1,575
Fairbanks North Star	18,806	66.30%	8,112	28.60%	1,447	5.10%	10,694	37.70%	28,365
Haines	672	63.58%	302	28.57%	83	7.85%	370	35.01%	1,057
Hoonah-Angoon	519	46.88%	550	49.68%	38	3.44%	-31	-2.80%	1,107
Juneau	7,323	56.60%	5,292	40.90%	324	2.50%	2,031	15.70%	12,939
Kenai Peninsula	10,297	70.10%	3,687	25.10%	705	4.80%	6,610	45.00%	14,689
Ketchikan Gateway	3,509	61.60%	2,033	35.69%	154	2.71%	1,476	25.91%	5,696
Kodiak Island	3,212	69.60%	1,237	26.80%	166	3.60%	1,975	42.80%	4,615
Kusilvak	847	47.83%	850	48.00%	74	4.17%	-3	-0.17%	1,771
Lake and Peninsula	446	78.94%	105	18.58%	14	2.48%	341	60.36%	565
Matanuska-Susitna	9,944	73.40%	2,940	21.70%	664	4.90%	7,004	51.70%	13,548
Nome	1,657	59.60%	1,059	38.09%	64	2.31%	598	21.51%	2,780
North Slope	929	60.09%	575	37.19%	42	2.72%	354	22.90%	1,546
Northwest Arctic	1,146	58.89%	745	38.28%	55	2.83%	401	20.61%	1,946
Petersburg	898	59.63%	574	38.11%	34	2.26%	324	21.52%	1,506
Prince of Wales-Hyder	1,254	54.90%	955	41.81%	75	3.29%	299	13.09%	2,284
Sitka	2,380	61.09%	1,403	36.01%	113	2.90%	977	25.08%	3,896
Skagway	215	59.39%	132	36.46%	15	4.15%	83	22.93%	362
Southeast Fairbanks	1,855	77.10%	457	18.99%	94	3.91%	1,398	58.11%	2,406
Valdez-Cordova	2,880	73.10%	934	23.71%	126	3.19%	1,946	49.39%	3,940
Wrangell	795	70.48%	308	27.30%	25	2.22%	487	43.18%	1,128
Yakutat	160	59.26%	96	35.56%	14	5.18%	64	23.70%	270
Yukon-Koyukuk	1,932	64.98%	951	31.99%	90	3.03%	981	32.99%	2,973
Totals	138,377	66.65%	62,007	29.87%	7,221	3.48%	76,370	36.78%	207,605

=== Boroughs and Census Areas that flipped from Democratic to Republican ===
- Nome Census Area
- Yukon-Kuyokuk Census Area
- Northwest Arctic Borough
- Bethel Census Area
- Dillingham Census Area

== See also ==
- United States presidential elections in Alaska
