= 1988 United States presidential election in Alaska =

- November 8, 1988

Nominee	George H. W. Bush	Michael Dukakis
Party	Republican	Democratic
Home state	Texas	Massachusetts
Running mate	Dan Quayle	Lloyd Bentsen
Electoral vote	3	0
Popular vote	119,251	72,584
Percentage	59.59%	36.27%

Bush
40–50%
50–60%
60–70%
70–80%
80–90%
90–100%
Dukakis
40–50%
50–60%
60–70%
70–80%
Other
Tie 40–50%
Tie 50%
President before election
Ronald Reagan
Republican
Elected President
George H. W. Bush
Republican

The 1988 United States presidential election in Alaska took place on November 8, 1988. All 50 states and the District of Columbia, were part of the 1988 United States presidential election. Alaska voters chose three electors to the Electoral College, which selected the president and vice president.

Alaska was won by incumbent United States Vice President George H. W. Bush of Texas, who was running against Massachusetts Governor Michael Dukakis. Bush ran with Indiana Senator Dan Quayle as vice president, and Dukakis ran with Texas Senator Lloyd Bentsen.

Bush won the election in Alaska with a resounding 23 point sweep-out landslide. Alaska has sent Republican electors to the Electoral College during every election in its history – except in 1964, where electors were sent for Democrat Lyndon B. Johnson.

The election was rather multi-partisan for Alaska, with nearly 5% of the votes going to third-party candidates. Leading the third-party turnout in Alaska, and with one of their best turnouts nationwide, Texas Congressman Ron Paul with running-mate and Alaska Legislator Andre Marrou were able to pull nearly 3% of votes in the state on the Libertarian Party ticket.

Alaska weighed in for this election as 16% more Republican than the national average.

== Campaign ==
=== Predictions ===
Source	Rating	As of
The Cook Political Report	Solid R	September 24, 1988

=== Results ===
1988 United States presidential election in Alaska
Party	Candidate	Votes	Percentage	Electoral votes
Republican	George H. W. Bush	119,251	59.59%	3
Democratic	Michael Dukakis	72,584	36.27%	0
Libertarian	Ron Paul	5,484	2.74%	0
New Alliance Party	Lenora Fulani	1,024	0.51%	0
Write-Ins		957	0.48%	0
Democrats for Economic Recovery	Lyndon LaRouche	816	0.41%	0
Totals		200,116	100.0%	3

=== By borough ===
Borough	George H.W. Bush Republican		Michael Dukakis Democratic		Various candidates Other parties		Margin		Total votes cast
Borough	#	%	#	%	#	%	#	%	Total votes cast
Aleutians East	321	65.91%	152	31.21%	14	2.88%	169	34.70%	487
Aleutians West	1,241	66.51%	580	31.08%	45	2.41%	661	35.43%	1,866
Anchorage	50,509	61.17%	29,427	35.64%	2,641	3.19%	21,082	25.53%	82,577
Bethel	1,951	51.79%	1,669	44.31%	147	3.90%	282	7.48%	3,767
Bristol Bay	309	61.31%	175	34.72%	20	3.97%	134	26.59%	504
Denali	520	58.10%	313	34.97%	62	6.93%	207	23.13%	895
Dillingham	800	58.18%	520	37.82%	55	4.00%	280	20.36%	1,375
Fairbanks North Star	18,728	60.50%	10,587	34.20%	1,640	5.30%	8,141	26.30%	30,955
Haines	512	56.26%	359	39.45%	39	4.29%	153	16.81%	910
Hoonah-Angoon	428	41.96%	532	52.16%	60	5.88%	-104	-10.20%	1,020
Juneau	5,963	48.15%	6,057	48.91%	365	2.94%	-94	-0.76%	12,385
Kenai Peninsula	8,632	60.19%	4,714	32.87%	995	6.94%	3,918	27.32%	14,341
Ketchikan Gateway	2,994	55.40%	2,216	41.01%	194	3.59%	778	14.39%	5,404
Kodiak Island	2,609	63.42%	1,351	32.84%	154	3.74%	1,258	30.58%	4,114
Kusilvak	817	52.30%	681	43.60%	64	4.10%	136	8.70%	1,562
Lake and Peninsula	338	65.89%	162	31.58%	13	2.53%	176	34.31%	513
Matanuska-Susitna	8,851	64.06%	4,174	30.21%	791	5.73%	4,677	33.85%	13,816
Nome	1,452	57.17%	993	39.09%	95	3.74%	459	18.08%	2,540
North Slope	916	53.32%	713	41.50%	89	5.18%	203	11.82%	1,718
Northwest Arctic	945	56.49%	663	39.63%	65	3.88%	282	16.86%	1,673
Petersburg	712	54.10%	562	42.71%	42	3.19%	150	11.39%	1,316
Prince of Wales-Hyder	1,097	50.88%	942	43.69%	117	5.43%	155	7.19%	2,156
Sitka	2,232	54.89%	1,720	42.30%	114	2.81%	512	12.59%	4,066
Skagway	205	55.11%	155	41.67%	12	3.22%	50	13.44%	372
Southeast Fairbanks	1,522	67.58%	588	26.11%	142	6.31%	934	41.47%	2,252
Valdez-Cordova	2,245	63.19%	1,162	32.70%	146	4.11%	1,083	30.49%	3,553
Wrangell	812	67.00%	365	30.12%	35	2.88%	447	36.88%	1,212
Yakutat	159	63.10%	80	31.75%	13	5.15%	79	31.35%	252
Yukon-Koyukuk	1,421	56.48%	959	38.12%	136	5.40%	462	18.36%	2,516
Totals	119,251	59.59%	72,584	36.27%	8,281	4.14%	46,667	23.32%	200,116

=== Boroughs and Census Areas that flipped from Republican to Democratic ===
- Juneau

=== Boroughs and Census Areas that flipped from Democratic to Republican ===
- Kusilvak Census Area

== See also ==
- Oil Pipelines in Alaska
- Presidency of George H. W. Bush
- United States presidential elections in Alaska
