= 1976 United States presidential election in Alaska =

- November 2, 1976

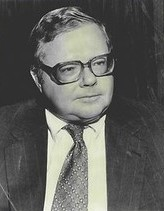
| Nominee | Gerald Ford | Jimmy Carter | Roger MacBride |
| Party | Republican | Democratic | Libertarian |
| Home state | Michigan | Georgia | Vermont |
| Running mate | Bob Dole | Walter Mondale | David Bergland |
| Electoral vote | 3 | 0 | 0 |
| Popular vote | 71,555 | 44,058 | 6,785 |
| Percentage | 57.90% | 35.65% | 5.49% |

Ford
40–50%
50–60%
60–70%
Carter
40–50%
50–60%
60–70%
President before election
Gerald Ford
Republican
Elected President
Jimmy Carter
Democratic

The 1976 United States presidential election in Alaska took place on November 2, 1976, as part of the nationwide presidential election. Voters chose three representatives, or electors to the Electoral College, who voted for president and vice president.

Alaska was won by incumbent President Gerald Ford (R-Michigan) with 57.9% of the popular vote against Jimmy Carter (D-Georgia) with 35.7%. Carter ultimately won the national vote however, defeating Ford and becoming the next President. Alaska has only voted Democratic once, and that was in 1964 for Lyndon B. Johnson.

With 57.9% of the popular vote, Alaska would prove to be Ford's fifth strongest state in the 1976 election after Utah, Idaho, Wyoming and Nebraska.

Libertarian candidate Roger MacBride also had his strongest showing in Alaska, which would continue to provide a base of votes for the new party.

== Results ==
1976 United States presidential election in Alaska
| Party | Candidate | Votes | Percentage | Electoral votes |
|---|---|---|---|---|
| Republican | Gerald Ford (incumbent) | 71,555 | 57.90% | 3 |
| Democratic | Jimmy Carter | 44,058 | 35.65% | 0 |
| Libertarian | Roger MacBride | 6,785 | 5.49% | 0 |
| N/A | Write-in | 1,176 | 0.95% | 0 |
| Totals | | 123,574 | 100.00% | 3 |

=== By borough ===
| Borough | Gerald Ford Republican | | Jimmy Carter Democratic | | Roger MacBride Libertarian | | Various candidates Other parties | | Margin | | Total votes cast |
| Borough | # | % | # | % | # | % | # | % | # | % | Total votes cast |
|---|---|---|---|---|---|---|---|---|---|---|---|
| Aleutians East | 198 | 63.87% | 106 | 34.19% | 6 | 1.94% | 0 | 0.00% | 92 | 29.68% | 310 |
| Aleutians West | 379 | 59.03% | 232 | 36.14% | 22 | 3.43% | 9 | 1.40% | 147 | 22.89% | 642 |
| Anchorage | 31,884 | 61.46% | 17,136 | 33.03% | 2,303 | 4.44% | 554 | 1.07% | 14,748 | 28.43% | 51,877 |
| Bethel | 1,344 | 46.89% | 1,410 | 49.20% | 106 | 3.70% | 6 | 0.21% | -66 | -2.31% | 2,866 |
| Bristol Bay | 169 | 50.60% | 147 | 44.01% | 18 | 5.39% | 0 | 0.00% | 22 | 6.59% | 334 |
| Denali | 402 | 57.10% | 244 | 34.66% | 52 | 7.39% | 6 | 0.85% | 158 | 22.44% | 704 |
| Dillingham | 512 | 53.39% | 411 | 42.86% | 36 | 3.75% | 0 | 0.00% | 101 | 10.53% | 959 |
| Fairbanks North Star | 10,279 | 54.00% | 6,681 | 35.10% | 1,746 | 9.17% | 329 | 1.73% | 3,598 | 18.90% | 19,035 |
| Haines | 337 | 61.16% | 182 | 33.03% | 28 | 5.08% | 4 | 0.73% | 155 | 28.13% | 551 |
| Hoonah-Angoon | 304 | 41.99% | 363 | 50.14% | 50 | 6.91% | 7 | 0.96% | -30 | -8.15% | 724 |
| Juneau | 4,676 | 58.80% | 2,887 | 36.30% | 255 | 3.21% | 135 | 1.69% | 1,789 | 22.50% | 7,953 |
| Kenai Peninsula | 4,699 | 60.22% | 2,525 | 32.36% | 560 | 7.18% | 19 | 0.24% | 2,174 | 27.86% | 7,803 |
| Ketchikan Gateway | 2,416 | 60.04% | 1,442 | 35.83% | 160 | 3.98% | 6 | 0.15% | 974 | 24.21% | 4,024 |
| Kodiak Island | 1,497 | 56.21% | 1,008 | 37.85% | 128 | 4.81% | 30 | 1.13% | 489 | 18.36% | 2,663 |
| Kusilvak | 513 | 49.33% | 495 | 47.60% | 0 | 0.00% | 32 | 3.07% | 18 | 1.73% | 1,040 |
| Lake and Peninsula | 211 | 57.49% | 135 | 36.78% | 21 | 5.73% | 0 | 0.00% | 76 | 20.71% | 367 |
| Matanuska-Susitna | 2,882 | 60.36% | 1,486 | 31.12% | 380 | 7.96% | 27 | 0.56% | 1,396 | 29.24% | 4,775 |
| Nome | 989 | 51.16% | 887 | 45.89% | 0 | 0.00% | 57 | 2.95% | 102 | 5.27% | 1,933 |
| North Slope | 339 | 32.85% | 655 | 63.47% | 0 | 0.00% | 38 | 3.68% | -316 | -30.62% | 1,032 |
| Northwest Arctic | 476 | 38.83% | 712 | 58.08% | 0 | 0.00% | 38 | 3.09% | -236 | -19.25% | 1,226 |
| Petersburg | 616 | 61.54% | 332 | 33.17% | 53 | 5.29% | 0 | 0.00% | 284 | 28.37% | 1,001 |
| Prince of Wales-Hyder | 683 | 47.53% | 660 | 45.93% | 88 | 6.12% | 6 | 0.43% | 23 | 1.60% | 1,437 |
| Sitka | 1,559 | 58.41% | 1,004 | 37.62% | 0 | 0.00% | 106 | 3.97% | 555 | 20.79% | 2,669 |
| Skagway | 230 | 67.45% | 99 | 29.03% | 0 | 0.00% | 12 | 3.52% | 131 | 38.42% | 341 |
| Southeast Fairbanks | 803 | 53.93% | 558 | 37.47% | 128 | 8.60% | 0 | 0.00% | 245 | 16.46% | 1,489 |
| Valdez-Cordova | 1,572 | 56.89% | 989 | 35.79% | 197 | 7.13% | 5 | 0.19% | 583 | 21.10% | 2,763 |
| Wrangell | 461 | 54.49% | 327 | 38.65% | 58 | 6.86% | 0 | 0.00% | 134 | 15.84% | 846 |
| Yakutat | 79 | 45.14% | 90 | 51.43% | 0 | 0.00% | 6 | 3.43% | -17 | -6.29% | 175 |
| Yukon-Koyukuk | 1,043 | 51.28% | 860 | 42.28% | 118 | 5.80% | 13 | 0.64% | 183 | 9.00% | 2,034 |
| Totals | 71,555 | 57.90% | 44,058 | 35.65% | 6,785 | 5.49% | 1,176 | 0.96% | 27,497 | 22.25% | 123,574 |

=== Boroughs and Census Areas that flipped from Republican to Democratic ===
- Northwest Arctic Borough
- Yakutat

=== Boroughs and Census Areas that flipped from Democratic to Republican ===
- Wade Hampton Census Area

== See also ==
- United States presidential elections in Alaska
