= List of United States presidential election results by state =

== Chronological table ==
The following is a table of United States presidential election results by state. They are indirect elections in which voters in each state cast ballots for a slate of electors of the U.S. Electoral College who pledge to vote for a specific political party's nominee for president.

- Bold italic text indicates the winner of the election
- ‡ indicates the winner lost the popular vote
- † indicates the winner was decided by the House of Representatives

State	1790	1792	1796	1800 †	1804	1808	1812	1816	1820	1824 †	1828	1832	1836	1840	1844	1848	1852	1856	1860	1864	1868	1872	1876 ‡	1880	1884	1888 ‡	1892	1896	1900	1904	1908	1912	1916	1920	1924	1928	1932	1936	1940	1944	1948	1952	1956	1960	1964	1968	1972	1976	1980	1984	1988	1992	1996	2000 ‡	2004	2008	2012	2016 ‡	2020	2024	State
Alabama									DR	Jackson	D	D	D	D	D	D	D	D	SD		R	R	D	D	D	D	D	D	D	D	D	D	D	D	D	D	D	D	D	D	SR	D	D	I	R	AI	R	D	R	R	R	R	R	R	R	R	R	R	R	R	Alabama
Alaska																																												R	D	R	R	R	R	R	R	R	R	R	R	R	R	R	R	R	Alaska
Arizona																																D	D	R	R	R	D	D	D	D	D	R	R	R	R	R	R	R	R	R	R	R	D	R	R	R	R	R	D	R	Arizona
Arkansas													D	D	D	D	D	D	SD		R	R	D	D	D	D	D	D	D	D	D	D	D	D	D	D	D	D	D	D	D	D	D	D	D	AI	R	D	R	R	R	D	D	R	R	R	R	R	R	R	Arkansas
California																	D	D	R	R	R	R	R	D	R	R	D	R	R	R	R	BM	D	R	R	R	D	D	D	D	D	R	R	R	D	R	R	R	R	R	R	D	D	D	D	D	D	D	D	D	California
Colorado																							R	R	R	R	PO	D	D	R	D	D	D	R	R	R	D	D	R	R	D	R	R	R	D	R	R	R	R	R	R	D	R	R	R	D	D	D	D	D	Colorado
Connecticut	GW	GW	F	F	F	F	F	F	DR	Adams	NR	NR	D	W	W	W	D	R	R	R	R	R	D	R	D	D	D	R	R	R	R	D	R	R	R	R	R	D	D	D	R	R	R	D	D	D	R	R	R	R	R	D	D	D	D	D	D	D	D	D	Connecticut
Delaware	GW	GW	F	F	F	F	F	F	DR	Crawford	NR	NR	W	W	W	W	D	D	SD	D	D	R	D	D	D	D	D	R	R	R	R	D	R	R	R	R	R	D	D	D	R	R	R	D	D	R	R	D	R	R	R	D	D	D	D	D	D	D	D	D	Delaware
D.C.																																													D	D	D	D	D	D	D	D	D	D	D	D	D	D	D	D	D.C.
Florida																W	D	D	SD		R	R	R	D	D	D	D	D	D	D	D	D	D	D	D	R	D	D	D	D	D	R	R	R	D	R	R	D	R	R	R	R	D	R	R	D	D	R	R	R	Florida
Georgia	GW	GW	DR	DR	DR	DR	DR	DR	DR	Crawford	D	D	W	W	D	W	D	D	SD		D	LR	D	D	D	D	D	D	D	D	D	D	D	D	D	D	D	D	D	D	D	D	D	D	R	AI	R	D	D	R	R	D	R	R	R	R	R	R	D	R	Georgia
Hawaii																																												D	D	D	R	D	D	R	D	D	D	D	D	D	D	D	D	D	Hawaii
Idaho																											PO	D	D	R	R	D	D	R	R	R	D	D	D	D	D	R	R	R	D	R	R	R	R	R	R	R	R	R	R	R	R	R	R	R	Idaho
Illinois									DR	Jackson	D	D	D	D	D	D	D	D	R	R	R	R	R	R	R	R	D	R	R	R	R	D	R	R	R	R	D	D	D	D	D	R	R	D	D	R	R	R	R	R	R	D	D	D	D	D	D	D	D	D	Illinois
Indiana								DR	DR	Jackson	D	D	W	W	D	D	D	D	R	R	R	R	D	R	D	R	D	R	R	R	R	D	R	R	R	R	D	D	R	R	R	R	R	R	D	R	R	R	R	R	R	R	R	R	R	D	R	R	R	R	Indiana
Iowa																D	D	R	R	R	R	R	R	R	R	R	R	R	R	R	R	D	R	R	R	R	D	D	R	R	D	R	R	R	D	R	R	R	R	R	D	D	D	D	R	D	D	R	R	R	Iowa
Kansas																				R	R	R	R	R	R	R	PO	D	R	R	R	D	D	R	R	R	D	D	R	R	R	R	R	R	D	R	R	R	R	R	R	R	R	R	R	R	R	R	R	R	Kansas
Kentucky		GW	DR	DR	DR	DR	DR	DR	DR	Clay	D	NR	W	W	W	W	W	D	CU	D	D	LR	D	D	D	D	D	R	D	D	D	D	D	D	R	R	D	D	D	D	D	D	R	R	D	R	R	D	R	R	R	D	D	R	R	R	R	R	R	R	Kentucky
Louisiana							DR	DR	DR	Jackson	D	D	D	W	D	W	D	D	SD	R	D	R	R	D	D	D	D	D	D	D	D	D	D	D	D	D	D	D	D	D	SR	D	R	D	R	AI	R	D	R	R	R	D	D	R	R	R	R	R	R	R	Louisiana
Maine									DR	Adams	NR	D	D	W	D	D	D	R	R	R	R	R	R	R	R	R	R	R	R	R	R	D	R	R	R	R	R	R	R	R	R	R	R	R	D	D	R	R	R	R	R	D	D	D	D	D	D	D	D	D	Maine
Maryland	GW	GW	F	SP	DR	DR	DR	DR	DR	Jackson	NR	NR	W	W	W	W	D	KN	SD	R	D	LR	D	D	D	D	D	R	R	D	D	D	D	R	R	R	D	D	D	D	R	R	R	D	D	D	R	D	D	R	R	D	D	D	D	D	D	D	D	D	Maryland
Massachusetts	GW	GW	F	F	DR	F	F	F	DR	Adams	NR	NR	W	W	W	W	W	R	R	R	R	R	R	R	R	R	R	R	R	R	R	D	R	R	R	D	D	D	D	D	D	R	R	D	D	D	D	D	R	R	D	D	D	D	D	D	D	D	D	D	Massachusetts
Michigan													D	W	D	D	D	R	R	R	R	R	R	R	R	R	R	R	R	R	R	BM	R	R	R	R	D	D	R	D	R	R	R	D	D	D	R	R	R	R	R	D	D	D	D	D	D	R	D	R	Michigan
Minnesota																			R	R	R	R	R	R	R	R	R	R	R	R	R	BM	R	R	R	R	D	D	D	D	D	R	R	D	D	D	R	D	D	D	D	D	D	D	D	D	D	D	D	D	Minnesota
Mississippi									DR	Jackson	D	D	D	W	D	D	D	D	SD			R	D	D	D	D	D	D	D	D	D	D	D	D	D	D	D	D	D	D	SR	D	D	I	R	AI	R	D	R	R	R	R	R	R	R	R	R	R	R	R	Mississippi
Missouri									DR	Jackson	D	D	D	D	D	D	D	D	ND	R	R	LR	D	D	D	D	D	D	D	R	R	D	D	R	R	R	D	D	D	D	D	R	D	D	D	R	R	D	R	R	R	D	D	R	R	R	R	R	R	R	Missouri
Montana																											R	D	D	R	R	D	D	R	R	R	D	D	D	D	D	R	R	R	D	R	R	R	R	R	R	D	R	R	R	R	R	R	R	R	Montana
Nebraska																					R	R	R	R	R	R	R	D	R	R	D	D	D	R	R	R	D	D	R	R	R	R	R	R	D	R	R	R	R	R	R	R	R	R	R	R	R	R	R	R	Nebraska
Nevada																				R	R	R	R	D	R	R	PO	D	D	R	D	D	D	R	R	R	D	D	D	D	D	R	R	D	D	R	R	R	R	R	R	D	D	R	R	D	D	D	D	R	Nevada
New Hampshire	GW	GW	F	F	DR	F	F	DR	DR	Adams	NR	D	D	D	D	D	D	R	R	R	R	R	R	R	R	R	R	R	R	R	R	D	D	R	R	R	R	D	D	D	R	R	R	R	D	R	R	R	R	R	R	D	D	R	D	D	D	D	D	D	New Hampshire
New Jersey	GW	GW	F	F	DR	DR	F	DR	DR	Jackson	NR	D	W	W	W	W	D	D	R	D	D	R	D	D	D	D	D	R	R	R	R	D	R	R	R	R	D	D	D	D	R	R	R	D	D	R	R	R	R	R	R	D	D	D	D	D	D	D	D	D	New Jersey
New Mexico																																D	D	R	R	R	D	D	D	D	D	R	R	D	D	R	R	R	R	R	R	D	D	D	R	D	D	D	D	D	New Mexico
New York		GW	F	DR	DR	DR	F	DR	DR	Adams	D	D	D	W	D	W	D	R	R	R	D	R	D	R	D	R	D	R	R	R	R	D	R	R	R	R	D	D	D	D	R	R	R	D	D	D	R	D	R	R	D	D	D	D	D	D	D	D	D	D	New York
North Carolina		GW	DR	DR	DR	DR	DR	DR	DR	Jackson	D	D	D	W	W	W	D	D	SD		R	R	D	D	D	D	D	D	D	D	D	D	D	D	D	R	D	D	D	D	D	D	D	D	D	R	R	D	R	R	R	R	R	R	R	D	R	R	R	R	North Carolina
North Dakota																											SP	R	R	R	R	D	D	R	R	R	D	D	R	R	R	R	R	R	D	R	R	R	R	R	R	R	R	R	R	R	R	R	R	R	North Dakota
Ohio					DR	DR	DR	DR	DR	Clay	D	D	W	W	W	D	D	R	R	R	R	R	R	R	R	R	R	R	R	R	R	D	D	R	R	R	D	D	D	R	D	R	R	R	D	R	R	D	R	R	R	D	D	R	R	D	D	R	R	R	Ohio
Oklahoma																															D	D	D	R	D	R	D	D	D	D	D	R	R	R	D	R	R	R	R	R	R	R	R	R	R	R	R	R	R	R	Oklahoma
Oregon																			R	R	D	R	R	R	R	R	R	R	R	R	R	D	R	R	R	R	D	D	D	D	R	R	R	R	D	R	R	R	R	R	D	D	D	D	D	D	D	D	D	D	Oregon
Pennsylvania	GW	GW	DR	DR	DR	DR	DR	DR	DR	Jackson	D	D	D	W	D	W	D	D	R	R	R	R	R	R	R	R	R	R	R	R	R	BM	R	R	R	R	R	D	D	D	R	R	R	D	D	D	R	D	R	R	R	D	D	D	D	D	D	R	D	R	Pennsylvania
Rhode Island		GW	F	F	DR	F	F	DR	DR	Adams	NR	NR	D	W	W	W	D	R	R	R	R	R	R	R	R	R	R	R	R	R	R	D	R	R	R	D	D	D	D	D	D	R	R	D	D	D	R	D	D	R	D	D	D	D	D	D	D	D	D	D	Rhode Island
South Carolina	GW	GW	DR	DR	DR	DR	DR	DR	DR	Jackson	D	N	W	D	D	D	D	D	SD		R	R	R	D	D	D	D	D	D	D	D	D	D	D	D	D	D	D	D	D	SR	D	D	D	R	R	R	D	R	R	R	R	R	R	R	R	R	R	R	R	South Carolina
South Dakota																											R	D	R	R	R	BM	R	R	R	R	D	D	R	R	R	R	R	R	D	R	R	R	R	R	R	R	R	R	R	R	R	R	R	R	South Dakota
Tennessee			DR	DR	DR	DR	DR	DR	DR	Jackson	D	D	W	W	W	W	W	D	CU	R	R	LR	D	D	D	D	D	D	D	D	D	D	D	R	D	R	D	D	D	D	D	R	R	R	D	R	R	D	R	R	R	D	D	R	R	R	R	R	R	R	Tennessee
Texas																D	D	D	SD			LR	D	D	D	D	D	D	D	D	D	D	D	D	D	R	D	D	D	D	D	R	R	D	D	D	R	D	R	R	R	R	R	R	R	R	R	R	R	R	Texas
Utah																												D	R	R	R	R	D	R	R	R	D	D	D	D	D	R	R	R	D	R	R	R	R	R	R	R	R	R	R	R	R	R	R	R	Utah
Vermont		GW	F	F	DR	DR	DR	DR	DR	Adams	NR	AM	W	W	W	W	W	R	R	R	R	R	R	R	R	R	R	R	R	R	R	R	R	R	R	R	R	R	R	R	R	R	R	R	D	R	R	R	R	R	R	D	D	D	D	D	D	D	D	D	Vermont
Virginia	GW	GW	DR	DR	DR	DR	DR	DR	DR	Crawford	D	D	D	D	D	D	D	D	CU			R	D	D	D	D	D	D	D	D	D	D	D	D	D	R	D	D	D	D	D	R	R	R	D	R	R	R	R	R	R	R	R	R	R	D	D	D	D	D	Virginia
Washington																											R	D	R	R	R	BM	D	R	R	R	D	D	D	D	D	R	R	R	D	D	R	R	R	R	D	D	D	D	D	D	D	D	D	D	Washington
West Virginia																				R	R	R	D	D	D	D	D	R	R	R	R	D	R	R	R	R	D	D	D	D	D	D	R	D	D	D	R	D	D	R	D	D	D	R	R	R	R	R	R	R	West Virginia
Wisconsin																D	D	R	R	R	R	R	R	R	R	R	D	R	R	R	R	D	R	R	PR	R	D	D	D	R	D	R	R	R	D	R	R	D	R	R	D	D	D	D	D	D	D	R	D	R	Wisconsin
Wyoming																											R	D	R	R	R	D	D	R	R	R	D	D	D	R	D	R	R	R	D	R	R	R	R	R	R	R	R	R	R	R	R	R	R	R	Wyoming
State	1789	1792	1796	1800	1804	1808	1812	1816	1820	1824	1828	1832	1836	1840	1844	1848	1852	1856	1860	1864	1868	1872	1876	1880	1884	1888	1892	1896	1900	1904	1908	1912	1916	1920	1924	1928	1932	1936	1940	1944	1948	1952	1956	1960	1964	1968	1972	1976	1980	1984	1988	1992	1996	2000	2004	2008	2012	2016	2020	2024	State

=== Legend ===
- R = Republican
- D = Democratic
- DR = Democratic-Republican
- W = Whig
- F = Federalist
- GW = George Washington
- NR = National Republican
- SD = Southern Democrat
- BM = Progressive "Bull Moose"
- LR = Liberal Republican
- AI = American Independent
- SR = States' Rights
- PO = Populist
- CU = Constitutional Union
- I = Independent
- PR = Progressive
- ND = Northern Democrat
- KN = Know Nothing
- AM = Anti-Masonic
- N = Nullifier
- SP = Split evenly

== Chronological table with states listed by census region ==
Bolded means the party won the national election that year

=== Northeast ===
State	1789	1792	1796	1800	1804	1808	1812	1816	1820	1824	1828	1832	1836	1840	1844	1848	1852	1856	1860	1864	1868	1872	1876	1880	State	1884	1888	1892	1896	1900	1904	1908	1912	1916	1920	1924	1928	1932	1936	1940	1944	1948	1952	1956	1960	1964	1968	1972	1976	1980	1984	1988	1992	1996	2000	2004	2008	2012	2016	2020	2024	State
Connecticut	**GW**	**GW**	**F**	F	F	F	F	F	**DR**	**Adams**	NR	NR	**D**	**W**	W	**W**	**D**	R	**R**	**R**	**R**	**R**	D	**R**	Connecticut	**D**	D	**D**	**R**	**R**	**R**	**R**	**D**	R	**R**	**R**	**R**	R	**D**	**D**	**D**	R	**R**	**R**	**D**	**D**	D	**R**	R	**R**	**R**	**R**	**D**	**D**	D	D	**D**	**D**	D	**D**	D	Connecticut
Maine									**DR**	**Adams**	NR	**D**	**D**	**W**	**D**	D	**D**	R	**R**	**R**	**R**	**R**	**R**	**R**	Maine	R	**R**	R	**R**	**R**	**R**	**R**	**D**	R	**R**	**R**	**R**	R	R	R	R	R	**R**	**R**	R	**D**	D	**R**	R	**R**	**R**	**R**	**D**	**D**	D	D	**D**	**D**	D	**D**	D	Maine
Massachusetts	**GW**	**GW**	**F**	F	**DR**	F	F	F	**DR**	**Adams**	NR	NR	W	**W**	W	**W**	W	R	**R**	**R**	**R**	**R**	**R**	**R**	Massachusetts	R	**R**	R	**R**	**R**	**R**	**R**	**D**	R	**R**	**R**	D	**D**	**D**	**D**	**D**	**D**	**R**	**R**	**D**	**D**	D	D	**D**	**R**	**R**	D	**D**	**D**	D	D	**D**	**D**	D	**D**	D	Massachusetts
New Hampshire	**GW**	**GW**	**F**	F	**DR**	F	F	**DR**	**DR**	**Adams**	NR	**D**	**D**	D	**D**	D	**D**	R	**R**	**R**	**R**	**R**	**R**	**R**	New Hampshire	R	**R**	R	**R**	**R**	**R**	**R**	**D**	**D**	**R**	**R**	**R**	R	**D**	**D**	**D**	R	**R**	**R**	R	**D**	**R**	**R**	R	**R**	**R**	**R**	**D**	**D**	**R**	D	**D**	**D**	D	**D**	D	New Hampshire
New Jersey	**GW**	**GW**	**F**	F	**DR**	**DR**	F	**DR**	**DR**	Jackson	NR	**D**	W	**W**	W	**W**	**D**	**D**	**R**	D	D	**R**	D	D	New Jersey	**D**	D	**D**	**R**	**R**	**R**	**R**	**D**	R	**R**	**R**	**R**	**D**	**D**	**D**	**D**	R	**R**	**R**	**D**	**D**	**R**	**R**	R	**R**	**R**	**R**	**D**	**D**	D	D	**D**	**D**	D	**D**	D	New Jersey
New York		**GW**	**F**	**DR**	**DR**	**DR**	F	**DR**	**DR**	**Adams**	**D**	**D**	**D**	**W**	**D**	**W**	**D**	R	**R**	**R**	D	**R**	D	**R**	New York	**D**	**R**	**D**	**R**	**R**	**R**	**R**	**D**	R	**R**	**R**	**R**	**D**	**D**	**D**	**D**	R	**R**	**R**	**D**	**D**	D	**R**	**D**	**R**	**R**	D	**D**	**D**	D	D	**D**	**D**	D	**D**	D	New York
Pennsylvania	**GW**	**GW**	DR	**DR**	**DR**	**DR**	**DR**	**DR**	**DR**	Jackson	**D**	**D**	**D**	**W**	**D**	**W**	**D**	**D**	**R**	**R**	**R**	**R**	**R**	**R**	Pennsylvania	R	**R**	R	**R**	**R**	**R**	**R**	BM	R	**R**	**R**	**R**	R	**D**	**D**	**D**	R	**R**	**R**	**D**	**D**	D	**R**	**D**	**R**	**R**	**R**	**D**	**D**	D	D	**D**	**D**	**R**	**D**	**R**	Pennsylvania
Rhode Island		**GW**	**F**	F	**DR**	F	F	**DR**	**DR**	**Adams**	NR	NR	**D**	**W**	W	**W**	**D**	R	**R**	**R**	**R**	**R**	**R**	**R**	Rhode Island	R	**R**	R	**R**	**R**	**R**	**R**	**D**	R	**R**	**R**	D	**D**	**D**	**D**	**D**	**D**	**R**	**R**	**D**	**D**	D	**R**	**D**	D	**R**	D	**D**	**D**	D	D	**D**	**D**	D	**D**	D	Rhode Island
Vermont		**GW**	**F**	F	**DR**	**DR**	**DR**	**DR**	**DR**	**Adams**	NR	AM	W	**W**	W	**W**	W	R	**R**	**R**	**R**	**R**	**R**	**R**	Vermont	R	**R**	R	**R**	**R**	**R**	**R**	R	R	**R**	**R**	**R**	R	R	R	R	R	**R**	**R**	R	**D**	**R**	**R**	R	**R**	**R**	**R**	**D**	**D**	D	D	**D**	**D**	D	**D**	D	Vermont
State	1789	1792	1796	1800	1804	1808	1812	1816	1820	1824	1828	1832	1836	1840	1844	1848	1852	1856	1860	1864	1868	1872	1876	1880	State	1884	1888	1892	1896	1900	1904	1908	1912	1916	1920	1924	1928	1932	1936	1940	1944	1948	1952	1956	1960	1964	1968	1972	1976	1980	1984	1988	1992	1996	2000	2004	2008	2012	2016	2020	2024	State

=== South ===
State	1789	1792	1796	1800	1804	1808	1812	1816	1820	1824	1828	1832	1836	1840	1844	1848	1852	1856	1860	1864	1868	1872	1876	1880	State	1884	1888	1892	1896	1900	1904	1908	1912	1916	1920	1924	1928	1932	1936	1940	1944	1948	1952	1956	1960	1964	1968	1972	1976	1980	1984	1988	1992	1996	2000	2004	2008	2012	2016	2020	2024	State
Alabama									**DR**	Jackson	**D**	**D**	**D**	D	**D**	D	**D**	**D**	SD		**R**	**R**	D	D	Alabama	**D**	D	**D**	D	D	D	D	**D**	**D**	D	D	D	**D**	**D**	**D**	**D**	SR	D	D	I	R	AI	**R**	**D**	**R**	**R**	**R**	R	R	**R**	**R**	R	R	**R**	R	**R**	Alabama
Arkansas													**D**	D	**D**	D	**D**	**D**	SD		**R**	**R**	D	D	Arkansas	**D**	D	**D**	D	D	D	D	**D**	**D**	D	D	D	**D**	**D**	**D**	**D**	**D**	D	D	**D**	**D**	AI	**R**	**D**	**R**	**R**	**R**	**D**	**D**	**R**	**R**	R	R	**R**	R	**R**	Arkansas
Delaware	**GW**	**GW**	**F**	F	F	F	F	F	**DR**	Crawford	NR	NR	W	**W**	W	**W**	**D**	**D**	SD	D	D	**R**	D	D	Delaware	**D**	D	**D**	**R**	**R**	**R**	**R**	**D**	R	**R**	**R**	**R**	R	**D**	**D**	**D**	R	**R**	**R**	**D**	**D**	**R**	**R**	**D**	**R**	**R**	**R**	**D**	**D**	D	D	**D**	**D**	D	**D**	D	Delaware
D.C.																									D.C.																					**D**	D	D	**D**	D	D	D	**D**	**D**	D	D	**D**	**D**	D	D	D	D.C.
Florida																**W**	**D**	**D**	SD		**R**	**R**	**R**	D	Florida	**D**	D	**D**	D	D	D	D	**D**	**D**	D	D	**R**	**D**	**D**	**D**	**D**	**D**	**R**	**R**	R	**D**	**R**	**R**	**D**	**R**	**R**	**R**	R	**D**	**R**	**R**	**D**	**D**	**R**	R	**R**	Florida
Georgia	**GW**	**GW**	DR	**DR**	**DR**	**DR**	**DR**	**DR**	**DR**	Crawford	**D**	**D**	W	**W**	**D**	**W**	**D**	**D**	SD		D	LR	D	D	Georgia	**D**	D	**D**	D	D	D	D	**D**	**D**	D	D	D	**D**	**D**	**D**	**D**	**D**	D	D	**D**	R	AI	**R**	**D**	D	**R**	**R**	**D**	R	**R**	**R**	R	R	**R**	**D**	**R**	Georgia
Kentucky		**GW**	DR	**DR**	**DR**	**DR**	**DR**	**DR**	**DR**	Clay	**D**	NR	W	**W**	W	**W**	W	**D**	CU	D	D	LR	D	D	Kentucky	**D**	D	**D**	**R**	D	D	D	**D**	**D**	D	**R**	**R**	**D**	**D**	**D**	**D**	**D**	D	**R**	R	**D**	**R**	**R**	**D**	**R**	**R**	**R**	**D**	**D**	**R**	**R**	R	R	**R**	R	**R**	Kentucky
Louisiana							**DR**	**DR**	**DR**	Jackson	**D**	**D**	**D**	**W**	**D**	**W**	**D**	**D**	SD	**R**	D	**R**	**R**	D	Louisiana	**D**	D	**D**	D	D	D	D	**D**	**D**	D	D	D	**D**	**D**	**D**	**D**	SR	D	**R**	**D**	R	AI	**R**	**D**	**R**	**R**	**R**	**D**	**D**	**R**	**R**	R	R	**R**	R	**R**	Louisiana
Maryland	**GW**	**GW**	**F**	SP	**DR**	**DR**	**DR**	**DR**	**DR**	Jackson	NR	NR	W	**W**	W	**W**	**D**	KN	SD	**R**	D	LR	D	D	Maryland	**D**	D	**D**	**R**	**R**	D	D	**D**	**D**	**R**	**R**	**R**	**D**	**D**	**D**	**D**	R	**R**	**R**	**D**	**D**	D	**R**	**D**	D	**R**	**R**	**D**	**D**	D	D	**D**	**D**	D	**D**	D	Maryland
Mississippi									**DR**	Jackson	**D**	**D**	**D**	**W**	**D**	D	**D**	**D**	SD			**R**	D	D	Mississippi	**D**	D	**D**	D	D	D	D	**D**	**D**	D	D	D	**D**	**D**	**D**	**D**	SR	D	D	I	R	AI	**R**	**D**	**R**	**R**	**R**	R	R	**R**	**R**	R	R	**R**	R	**R**	Mississippi
North Carolina		**GW**	DR	**DR**	**DR**	**DR**	**DR**	**DR**	**DR**	Jackson	**D**	**D**	**D**	**W**	W	**W**	**D**	**D**	SD		**R**	**R**	D	D	North Carolina	**D**	D	**D**	D	D	D	D	**D**	**D**	D	D	**R**	**D**	**D**	**D**	**D**	**D**	D	D	**D**	**D**	**R**	**R**	**D**	**R**	**R**	**R**	R	R	**R**	**R**	**D**	R	**R**	R	**R**	North Carolina
Oklahoma																									Oklahoma							D	**D**	**D**	**R**	D	**R**	**D**	**D**	**D**	**D**	**D**	**R**	**R**	R	**D**	**R**	**R**	R	**R**	**R**	**R**	R	R	**R**	**R**	R	R	**R**	R	**R**	Oklahoma
South Carolina	**GW**	**GW**	DR	**DR**	**DR**	**DR**	**DR**	**DR**	**DR**	Jackson	**D**	N	W	D	**D**	D	**D**	**D**	SD		**R**	**R**	**R**	D	South Carolina	**D**	D	**D**	D	D	D	D	**D**	**D**	D	D	D	**D**	**D**	**D**	**D**	SR	D	D	**D**	R	**R**	**R**	**D**	**R**	**R**	**R**	R	R	**R**	**R**	R	R	**R**	R	**R**	South Carolina
Tennessee			DR	**DR**	**DR**	**DR**	**DR**	**DR**	**DR**	Jackson	**D**	**D**	W	**W**	W	**W**	W	**D**	CU	**R**	**R**	LR	D	D	Tennessee	**D**	D	**D**	D	D	D	D	**D**	**D**	**R**	D	**R**	**D**	**D**	**D**	**D**	**D**	**R**	**R**	R	**D**	**R**	**R**	**D**	**R**	**R**	**R**	**D**	**D**	**R**	**R**	R	R	**R**	R	**R**	Tennessee
Texas																D	**D**	**D**	SD			LR	D	D	Texas	**D**	D	**D**	D	D	D	D	**D**	**D**	D	D	**R**	**D**	**D**	**D**	**D**	**D**	**R**	**R**	**D**	**D**	D	**R**	**D**	**R**	**R**	**R**	R	R	**R**	**R**	R	R	**R**	R	**R**	Texas
Virginia	**GW**	**GW**	DR	**DR**	**DR**	**DR**	**DR**	**DR**	**DR**	Crawford	**D**	**D**	**D**	D	**D**	D	**D**	**D**	CU			**R**	D	D	Virginia	**D**	D	**D**	D	D	D	D	**D**	**D**	D	D	**R**	**D**	**D**	**D**	**D**	**D**	**R**	**R**	R	**D**	**R**	**R**	R	**R**	**R**	**R**	R	R	**R**	**R**	**D**	**D**	D	**D**	D	Virginia
West Virginia																				**R**	**R**	**R**	D	D	West Virginia	**D**	D	**D**	**R**	**R**	**R**	**R**	**D**	R	**R**	**R**	**R**	**D**	**D**	**D**	**D**	**D**	D	**R**	**D**	**D**	D	**R**	**D**	D	**R**	D	**D**	**D**	**R**	**R**	R	R	**R**	R	**R**	West Virginia
State	1789	1792	1796	1800	1804	1808	1812	1816	1820	1824	1828	1832	1836	1840	1844	1848	1852	1856	1860	1864	1868	1872	1876	1880	State	1884	1888	1892	1896	1900	1904	1908	1912	1916	1920	1924	1928	1932	1936	1940	1944	1948	1952	1956	1960	1964	1968	1972	1976	1980	1984	1988	1992	1996	2000	2004	2008	2012	2016	2020	2024	State

=== Midwest ===
State	1804	1808	1812	1816	1820	1824	1828	1832	1836	1840	1844	1848	1852	1856	1860	1864	1868	1872	1876	1880	State	1884	1888	1892	1896	1900	1904	1908	1912	1916	1920	1924	1928	1932	1936	1940	1944	1948	1952	1956	1960	1964	1968	1972	1976	1980	1984	1988	1992	1996	2000	2004	2008	2012	2016	2020	2024	State
Illinois					**DR**	Jackson	**D**	**D**	**D**	D	**D**	D	**D**	**D**	**R**	**R**	**R**	**R**	**R**	**R**	Illinois	R	**R**	**D**	**R**	**R**	**R**	**R**	**D**	R	**R**	**R**	**R**	**D**	**D**	**D**	**D**	**D**	**R**	**R**	**D**	**D**	**R**	**R**	R	**R**	**R**	**R**	**D**	**D**	D	D	**D**	**D**	D	**D**	D	Illinois
Indiana				**DR**	**DR**	Jackson	**D**	**D**	W	**W**	**D**	D	**D**	**D**	**R**	**R**	**R**	**R**	D	**R**	Indiana	**D**	**R**	**D**	**R**	**R**	**R**	**R**	**D**	R	**R**	**R**	**R**	**D**	**D**	R	R	R	**R**	**R**	R	**D**	**R**	**R**	R	**R**	**R**	**R**	R	R	**R**	**R**	**D**	R	**R**	R	**R**	Indiana
Iowa												D	**D**	R	**R**	**R**	**R**	**R**	**R**	**R**	Iowa	R	**R**	R	**R**	**R**	**R**	**R**	**D**	R	**R**	**R**	**R**	**D**	**D**	R	R	**D**	**R**	**R**	R	**D**	**R**	**R**	R	**R**	**R**	D	**D**	**D**	D	**R**	**D**	**D**	**R**	R	**R**	Iowa
Kansas																**R**	**R**	**R**	**R**	**R**	Kansas	R	**R**	PO	D	**R**	**R**	**R**	**D**	**D**	**R**	**R**	**R**	**D**	**D**	R	R	R	**R**	**R**	R	**D**	**R**	**R**	R	**R**	**R**	**R**	R	R	**R**	**R**	R	R	**R**	R	**R**	Kansas
Michigan									**D**	**W**	**D**	D	**D**	R	**R**	**R**	**R**	**R**	**R**	**R**	Michigan	R	**R**	R	**R**	**R**	**R**	**R**	BM	R	**R**	**R**	**R**	**D**	**D**	R	**D**	R	**R**	**R**	**D**	**D**	D	**R**	R	**R**	**R**	**R**	**D**	**D**	D	D	**D**	**D**	**R**	**D**	**R**	Michigan
Minnesota															**R**	**R**	**R**	**R**	**R**	**R**	Minnesota	R	**R**	R	**R**	**R**	**R**	**R**	BM	R	**R**	**R**	**R**	**D**	**D**	**D**	**D**	**D**	**R**	**R**	**D**	**D**	D	**R**	**D**	D	D	D	**D**	**D**	D	D	**D**	**D**	D	**D**	D	Minnesota
Missouri					**DR**	Jackson	**D**	**D**	**D**	D	**D**	D	**D**	**D**	ND	**R**	**R**	LR	D	D	Missouri	**D**	D	**D**	D	D	**R**	**R**	**D**	**D**	**R**	**R**	**R**	**D**	**D**	**D**	**D**	**D**	**R**	D	**D**	**D**	**R**	**R**	**D**	**R**	**R**	**R**	**D**	**D**	**R**	**R**	R	R	**R**	R	**R**	Missouri
Nebraska																	**R**	**R**	**R**	**R**	Nebraska	R	**R**	R	D	**R**	**R**	D	**D**	**D**	**R**	**R**	**R**	**D**	**D**	R	R	R	**R**	**R**	R	**D**	**R**	**R**	R	**R**	**R**	**R**	R	R	**R**	**R**	R	R	**R**	R	**R**	Nebraska
North Dakota																					North Dakota			SP	**R**	**R**	**R**	**R**	**D**	**D**	**R**	**R**	**R**	**D**	**D**	R	R	R	**R**	**R**	R	**D**	**R**	**R**	R	**R**	**R**	**R**	R	R	**R**	**R**	R	R	**R**	R	**R**	North Dakota
Ohio	**DR**	**DR**	**DR**	**DR**	**DR**	Clay	**D**	**D**	W	**W**	W	D	**D**	R	**R**	**R**	**R**	**R**	**R**	**R**	Ohio	R	**R**	R	**R**	**R**	**R**	**R**	**D**	**D**	**R**	**R**	**R**	**D**	**D**	**D**	R	**D**	**R**	**R**	R	**D**	**R**	**R**	**D**	**R**	**R**	**R**	**D**	**D**	**R**	**R**	**D**	**D**	**R**	R	**R**	Ohio
South Dakota																					South Dakota			R	D	**R**	**R**	**R**	BM	R	**R**	**R**	**R**	**D**	**D**	R	R	R	**R**	**R**	R	**D**	**R**	**R**	R	**R**	**R**	**R**	R	R	**R**	**R**	R	R	**R**	R	**R**	South Dakota
Wisconsin												D	**D**	R	**R**	**R**	**R**	**R**	**R**	**R**	Wisconsin	R	**R**	**D**	**R**	**R**	**R**	**R**	**D**	R	**R**	PR	**R**	**D**	**D**	**D**	R	**D**	**R**	**R**	R	**D**	**R**	**R**	**D**	**R**	**R**	D	**D**	**D**	D	D	**D**	**D**	**R**	**D**	**R**	Wisconsin
State	1804	1808	1812	1816	1820	1824	1828	1832	1836	1840	1844	1848	1852	1856	1860	1864	1868	1872	1876	1880	State	1884	1888	1892	1896	1900	1904	1908	1912	1916	1920	1924	1928	1932	1936	1940	1944	1948	1952	1956	1960	1964	1968	1972	1976	1980	1984	1988	1992	1996	2000	2004	2008	2012	2016	2020	2024	State

=== West ===
State	1852	1856	1860	1864	1868	1872	1876	1880	1884	1888	1892	1896	1900	1904	1908	1912	1916	1920	1924	1928	1932	1936	1940	1944	1948	1952	1956	1960	1964	1968	1972	1976	1980	1984	1988	1992	1996	2000	2004	2008	2012	2016	2020	2024	State
Alaska																												R	**D**	**R**	**R**	R	**R**	**R**	**R**	R	R	**R**	**R**	R	R	**R**	R	**R**	Alaska
Arizona																**D**	**D**	**R**	**R**	**R**	**D**	**D**	**D**	**D**	**D**	**R**	**R**	R	R	**R**	**R**	R	**R**	**R**	**R**	R	**D**	**R**	**R**	R	R	**R**	**D**	**R**	Arizona
California	**D**	**D**	**R**	**R**	**R**	**R**	**R**	D	R	**R**	**D**	**R**	**R**	**R**	**R**	BM	**D**	**R**	**R**	**R**	**D**	**D**	**D**	**D**	**D**	**R**	**R**	R	**D**	**R**	**R**	R	**R**	**R**	**R**	**D**	**D**	D	D	**D**	**D**	D	**D**	D	California
Colorado							**R**	**R**	R	**R**	PO	D	D	**R**	D	**D**	**D**	**R**	**R**	**R**	**D**	**D**	R	R	**D**	**R**	**R**	R	**D**	**R**	**R**	R	**R**	**R**	**R**	**D**	R	**R**	**R**	**D**	**D**	D	**D**	D	Colorado
Hawaii																												**D**	**D**	D	**R**	**D**	D	**R**	D	**D**	**D**	D	D	**D**	**D**	D	**D**	D	Hawaii
Idaho											PO	D	D	**R**	**R**	**D**	**D**	**R**	**R**	**R**	**D**	**D**	**D**	**D**	**D**	**R**	**R**	R	**D**	**R**	**R**	R	**R**	**R**	**R**	R	R	**R**	**R**	R	R	**R**	R	**R**	Idaho
Montana											R	D	D	**R**	**R**	**D**	**D**	**R**	**R**	**R**	**D**	**D**	**D**	**D**	**D**	**R**	**R**	R	**D**	**R**	**R**	R	**R**	**R**	**R**	**D**	R	**R**	**R**	R	R	**R**	R	**R**	Montana
Nevada				**R**	**R**	**R**	**R**	D	R	**R**	PO	D	D	**R**	D	**D**	**D**	**R**	**R**	**R**	**D**	**D**	**D**	**D**	**D**	**R**	**R**	**D**	**D**	**R**	**R**	R	**R**	**R**	**R**	**D**	**D**	**R**	**R**	**D**	**D**	D	**D**	**R**	Nevada
New Mexico																**D**	**D**	**R**	**R**	**R**	**D**	**D**	**D**	**D**	**D**	**R**	**R**	**D**	**D**	**R**	**R**	R	**R**	**R**	**R**	**D**	**D**	D	**R**	**D**	**D**	D	**D**	D	New Mexico
Oregon			**R**	**R**	D	**R**	**R**	**R**	R	**R**	R	**R**	**R**	**R**	**R**	**D**	R	**R**	**R**	**R**	**D**	**D**	**D**	**D**	R	**R**	**R**	R	**D**	**R**	**R**	R	**R**	**R**	D	**D**	**D**	D	D	**D**	**D**	D	**D**	D	Oregon
Utah												D	**R**	**R**	**R**	R	**D**	**R**	**R**	**R**	**D**	**D**	**D**	**D**	**D**	**R**	**R**	R	**D**	**R**	**R**	R	**R**	**R**	**R**	R	R	**R**	**R**	R	R	**R**	R	**R**	Utah
Washington											R	D	**R**	**R**	**R**	BM	**D**	**R**	**R**	**R**	**D**	**D**	**D**	**D**	**D**	**R**	**R**	R	**D**	D	**R**	R	**R**	**R**	D	**D**	**D**	D	D	**D**	**D**	D	**D**	D	Washington
Wyoming											R	D	**R**	**R**	**R**	**D**	**D**	**R**	**R**	**R**	**D**	**D**	**D**	R	**D**	**R**	**R**	R	**D**	**R**	**R**	R	**R**	**R**	**R**	R	R	**R**	**R**	R	R	**R**	R	**R**	Wyoming
State	1852	1856	1860	1864	1868	1872	1876	1880	1884	1888	1892	1896	1900	1904	1908	1912	1916	1920	1924	1928	1932	1936	1940	1944	1948	1952	1956	1960	1964	1968	1972	1976	1980	1984	1988	1992	1996	2000	2004	2008	2012	2016	2020	2024	State

== Analytical table ==
There are separate columns for votes since 1856. This was the first election to feature both Democratic and Republican parties. Data shown through 2024.

State	Votes	Votes since 1856	Democratic votes	D votes since 1856	% of D votes	D % since 1856	Republican votes	% of R votes	R % since 1856	Other votes	O votes since 1856	% of O votes	O % since 1856
Alabama	51	42	29	22	57%	52%	16	31%	38%	6	4	12%	10%
Alaska	17	17	1	1	6%	6%	16	94%	94%	0	0	0%	0%
Arizona	29	29	9	9	31%	31%	20	69%	69%	0	0	0%	0%
Arkansas	47	42	32	27	68%	64%	13	28%	31%	2	2	4%	5%
California	44	43	20	19	45%	44%	23	52%	53%	1	1	2%	2%
Colorado	38	38	15	15	39%	39%	22	58%	58%	1	1	3%	3%
Connecticut	60	43	22	20	37%	47%	23	38%	53%	15	0	25%	0%
Delaware	60	43	25	24	42%	56%	18	30%	42%	17	1	28%	2%
D.C.	16	16	16	16	100%	100%	0	0%	0%	0	0	0%	0%
Florida	44	42	24	23	55%	55%	18	41%	43%	2	1	5%	2%
Georgia	59	42	32	28	54%	67%	11	19%	26%	16	3	27%	7%
Hawaii	17	17	15	15	88%	88%	2	12%	12%	0	0	0%	0%
Idaho	34	34	10	10	29%	29%	23	68%	68%	1	1	3%	3%
Illinois	52	43	26	19	50%	44%	24	46%	56%	2	0	4%	0%
Indiana	53	43	14	9	26%	21%	34	64%	79%	5	0	9%	0%
Iowa	45	43	13	11	29%	26%	32	71%	74%	0	0	0%	0%
Kansas	41	41	6	6	15%	15%	34	83%	83%	1	1	2%	2%
Kentucky	59	43	25	24	42%	56%	17	29%	40%	17	2	29%	5%
Louisiana	54	43	29	24	54%	56%	16	30%	37%	9	3	17%	7%
Maine	52	43	17	12	33%	28%	31	60%	72%	4	0	8%	0%
Maryland	60	43	29	28	48%	65%	12	20%	28%	19	3	32%	7%
Massachusetts	60	43	22	22	37%	51%	21	35%	49%	17	0	28%	0%
Michigan	48	43	17	13	35%	30%	29	60%	67%	2	1	4%	2%
Minnesota	42	42	21	21	50%	50%	20	48%	48%	1	1	2%	2%
Mississippi	50	41	28	22	56%	54%	15	30%	37%	7	4	14%	10%
Missouri	52	43	28	21	54%	49%	20	38%	47%	4	2	8%	5%
Montana	34	34	11	11	32%	32%	23	68%	68%	0	0	0%	0%
Nebraska	40	40	7	7	18%	18%	33	83%	83%	0	0	0%	0%
Nevada	41	41	19	19	46%	46%	21	51%	51%	1	1	3%	3%
New Hampshire	60	43	20	14	33%	33%	29	48%	67%	11	0	18%	0%
New Jersey	60	43	26	24	43%	56%	19	32%	44%	15	0	25%	0%
New Mexico	29	29	17	17	59%	59%	12	41%	41%	0	0	0%	0%
New York	59	43	28	23	47%	53%	20	34%	47%	11	0	19%	0%
North Carolina	58	42	29	25	50%	60%	16	28%	38%	13	1	22%	2%
North Dakota	34	34	5	5	15%	15%	28	82%	82%	1	1	3%	3%
Ohio	56	43	16	12	29%	28%	31	55%	72%	9	0	16%	0%
Oklahoma	30	30	10	10	33%	33%	20	67%	67%	0	0	0%	0%
Oregon	42	42	17	17	40%	40%	25	60%	60%	0	0	0%	0%
Pennsylvania	60	43	20	15	33%	35%	27	45%	63%	13	1	22%	2%
Rhode Island	59	43	24	22	41%	51%	21	36%	49%	14	0	24%	0%
South Carolina	59	42	27	22	46%	52%	18	31%	43%	14	2	24%	5%
South Dakota	34	34	4	4	12%	12%	29	85%	85%	1	1	3%	3%
Tennessee	58	43	24	22	41%	51%	19	33%	44%	15	2	26%	5%
Texas	43	41	25	23	58%	56%	16	37%	39%	2	2	5%	5%
Utah	33	33	8	8	24%	24%	25	76%	76%	0	0	0%	0%
Vermont	59	43	10	10	17%	23%	33	56%	77%	16	0	27%	0%
Virginia	58	41	32	25	55%	61%	15	26%	37%	11	1	19%	2%
Washington	34	34	19	19	56%	56%	14	41%	41%	1	1	3%	3%
West Virginia	41	41	20	20	49%	49%	21	51%	51%	0	0	0%	0%
Wisconsin	45	43	18	16	40%	37%	26	58%	60%	1	1	2%	2%
Wyoming	34	34	8	8	24%	24%	26	76%	76%	0	0	0%	0%

== Maps ==
1789

1792

1796

1800

1804

1808

1812

1816

1820

1824

1828

1832

1836

1840

1844

1848

1852

1856

1860

1864

1868

1872

1876

1880

1884

1888

1892

1896

1900

1904

1908

1912

1916

1920

1924

1928

1932

1936

1940

1944

1948

1952

1956

1960

1964

1968

1972

1976

1980

1984

1988

1992

1996

2000

2004

2008

2012

2016

2020

2024

== See also ==
- Electoral vote changes between presidential elections
- List of highest presidential election vote totals by U.S. state
- List of United States Senate election results by state
- Non-binding presidential straw polls by U.S. territory:
  - Guam
  - Puerto Rico
