= 1992 United States presidential election in Alaska =

- November 3, 1992
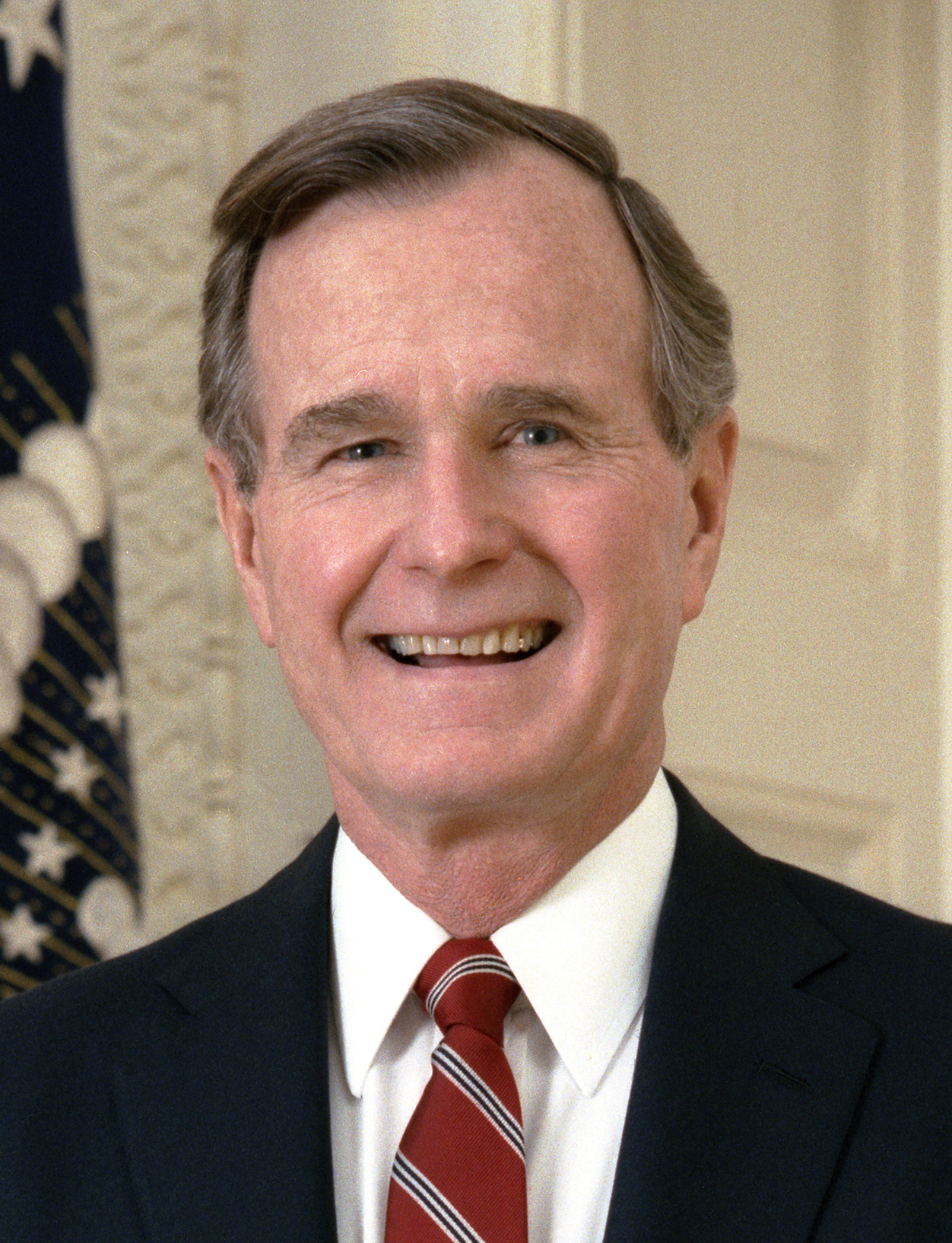

Nominee	George H. W. Bush	Bill Clinton	Ross Perot
Party	Republican	Democratic	Independent
Home state	Texas	Arkansas	Texas
Running mate	Dan Quayle	Al Gore	James Stockdale
Electoral vote	3	0	0
Popular vote	102,000	78,294	73,481
Percentage	39.46%	30.29%	28.43%

Bush
30–40%
40–50%
50–60%
60–70%
70–80%
90–100%
Clinton
30–40%
40–50%
50–60%
60–70%
70–80%
80–90%
90–100%
Perot
30–40%
40–50%
50–60%
60–70%
Other
Tie
President before election
George H. W. Bush
Republican
Elected President
Bill Clinton
Democratic

The 1992 United States presidential election in Alaska took place on November 3, 1992, as part of the 1992 United States presidential election. Voters chose three representatives, or electors to the Electoral College, who voted for president and vice president.

Alaska was won by incumbent President George H. W. Bush (R-Texas) with 39.4% of the popular vote over Governor Bill Clinton (D-Arkansas) with 30.2%. Bush won Alaska by a margin of 9.2%. Businessman Ross Perot (I-Texas) finished in third, with 28.4% of the popular vote. Clinton ultimately won the national vote, defeating incumbent President Bush. Alaska has only voted Democratic once, and that was in 1964 for Lyndon B. Johnson. To date, this is the last time the Republican margin of victory in Alaska has been in single digits and the last time that the state was won with a plurality. This is the only election since its statehood in which Alaska voted for a different candidate than Montana.

With 28.43% of the popular vote, Alaska would prove to be Perot's second strongest state after Maine. Alaska was also one of seven states to give a county or county-equivalent to Perot, the others being California, Colorado, Kansas, Maine, Nevada and Texas. Alaska awarded Perot Denali Borough, making it the last time it did not vote for the Republican candidate.

== Results ==
1992 United States presidential election in Alaska
Party	Candidate	Votes	Percentage	Electoral votes
Republican	George H. W. Bush (incumbent)	102,000	39.46%	3
Democratic	Bill Clinton	78,294	30.29%	0
Independent	Ross Perot	73,481	28.43%	0
America First	James "Bo" Gritz	1,379	0.53%	0
Libertarian	Andre Marrou	1,378	0.53%	0
Democrats for Economic Recovery	Lyndon LaRouche	469	0.18%	0
Natural Law	John Hagelin	433	0.17%	0
Taxpayers’	Howard Phillips	377	0.15%	0
Write-ins		365	0.14%	0
New Alliance Party	Lenora Fulani	330	0.13%	0
Totals		258,506	100.0%	3

=== By borough ===
Borough	George H.W. Bush Republican		Bill Clinton Democratic		Ross Perot Independent		Various candidates Other parties		Margin		Total votes cast
Borough	#	%	#	%	#	%	#	%	#	%	Total votes cast
Aleutians East	300	50.25%	164	27.47%	131	21.94%	2	0.34%	136	22.78%	597
Aleutians West	803	37.09%	687	31.73%	648	29.93%	27	1.25%	116	5.36%	2,166
Anchorage	45,226	41.35%	32,866	30.05%	29,607	27.07%	1,665	1.53%	12,360	11.30%	109,364
Bethel	1,840	40.01%	1,844	40.10%	792	17.22%	123	2.67%	-4	-0.09%	4,599
Bristol Bay	290	40.45%	196	27.34%	224	31.24%	7	0.97%	66	9.21% (Note: In this county where Perot placed second, margin given is difference from Perot vote.)	717
Denali	335	29.52%	363	31.98%	418	36.83%	19	1.67%	-55	-4.85% (Note: Margin given is difference from Perot minus Clinton vote.)	1,135
Dillingham	707	45.67%	536	34.65%	287	18.52%	18	1.16%	171	11.02%	1,548
Fairbanks North Star	15,225	39.60%	10,892	28.33%	11,546	30.03%	782	2.04%	4,333	9.57%	38,445
Haines	463	32.70%	523	36.94%	402	28.39%	28	1.97%	-60	-4.24%	1,416
Hoonah-Angoon	260	28.17%	407	44.10%	233	25.24%	23	2.49%	-147	-15.93%	923
Juneau	5,341	34.95%	6,752	44.19%	2,985	19.54%	202	1.32%	-1,411	-9.24%	15,280
Kenai Peninsula	6,890	36.54%	4,827	25.60%	6,677	35.41%	464	1.45%	213	1.13%	18,858
Ketchikan Gateway	2,468	36.80%	2,050	30.57%	2,103	31.36%	85	1.27%	365	5.44%	6,706
Kodiak Island	2,293	41.30%	1,472	26.51%	1,719	30.96%	68	1.23%	574	10.34%	5,552
Kusilvak	759	42.77%	701	39.53%	275	15.51%	39	2.19%	58	3.24%	1,774
Lake and Peninsula	291	47.55%	152	24.84%	160	26.14%	9	1.47%	131	21.41%	612
Matanuska-Susitna	7,559	37.97%	4,388	22.04%	7,389	37.12%	572	2.87%	170	0.85%	19,906
Nome	1,147	38.02%	1,223	40.51%	591	19.58%	57	1.89%	-76	-2.49%	3,018
North Slope	666	35.02%	762	40.06%	436	22.92%	38	2.00%	-96	-5.04%	1,902
Northwest Arctic	871	39.97%	826	37.94%	419	19.24%	62	2.85%	45	2.03%	2,178
Petersburg	583	33.37%	579	33.14%	572	32.74%	13	0.75%	4	0.23%	1,747
Prince of Wales-Hyder	840	31.60%	909	34.20%	846	31.83%	63	2.37%	-63	-2.37%	2,658
Sitka	1,741	37.79%	1,697	36.84%	1,099	23.86%	70	1.51%	44	0.95%	4,607
Skagway	178	37.32%	154	32.29%	139	29.14%	6	1.25%	24	5.03%	477
Southeast Fairbanks	1,158	43.91%	524	19.87%	880	33.37%	75	2.85%	278	10.54%	2,637
Valdez-Cordova	1,977	39.33%	1,303	25.92%	1,614	32.11%	133	2.64%	363	7.22%	5,027
Wrangell	592	43.37%	289	21.17%	466	34.14%	18	1.32%	126	9.23%	1,365
Yakutat	130	40.50%	108	33.64%	81	25.23%	2	0.63%	22	6.86%	321
Yukon-Koyukuk	1,038	35.65%	1,082	37.16%	734	25.21%	58	1.98%	-44	-1.51%	2,912
Totals	102,000	39.46%	78,294	30.29%	73,481	28.43%	4,731	1.82%	23,706	9.17%	258,506

Boroughs and Census Areas that flipped from Republican to Democratic

- Haines Borough
- Nome Census Area
- North Slope Borough
- Prince of Wales-Hyder Census Area
- Yukon-Koyukuk Census Area

Boroughs that flipped from Republican to Independent

- Denali Borough

== See also ==
- United States presidential elections in Alaska
