= United States presidential elections in Hawaii =

Presidential elections in Hawaii
- Number of elections: 17
- Voted Democratic: 15
- Voted Republican: 2
- Voted other: 0
- Voted for winning candidate: 10
- Voted for losing candidate: 7

Hawaii is a state in the Western United States located in the Pacific Ocean about 2,000 miles (3,200 kilometres) from the U.S. mainland. Since its admission to the Union on August 21, 1959, it has participated in 16 United States presidential elections. In the 1960 presidential election, Hawaii was narrowly won by the Democratic Party's candidate John F. Kennedy, defeating the Republican Party's candidate and incumbent vice president Richard Nixon by a margin of just 0.06% (115 votes). In the 1964 presidential election, the Democratic Party's candidate Lyndon B. Johnson won Hawaii by a margin of 57.52%, which remains the largest ever margin of victory in the state's history. Since the 1960 election, Hawaii has been won by the Democratic Party in every presidential election, except in 1972 and 1984, which were both won in a national Republican landslide victory by Nixon and Ronald Reagan respectively.

In the 1992 presidential election, the independent candidate Ross Perot received the highest percentage of vote share (14.22%) ever won by a third-party candidate in Hawaii. In the 2016 presidential election, a faithless elector (Note: In the United States Electoral College, a faithless elector is one who does not vote for the candidate the elector had pledged to vote, instead voting for another person for president or/and vice president.) pledged to the Democratic Party instead voted for Bernie Sanders for president and Elizabeth Warren for vice president. Subsequently, the Democratic ticket of Hillary Clinton and Tim Kaine received only three electoral votes from Hawaii. Gallup Poll has ranked Hawaii in the top ten most Democratic states. As of 2024, no Republican has ever carried the state in two consecutive elections since Nixon and Reagan only won it in their 1972 and 1984 re-election bids, Democrats, however have carried the state in consecutive elections.

Hawaii is a signatory of the National Popular Vote Interstate Compact, an interstate compact in which signatories award all of their electoral votes to the winner of the national-level popular vote in a presidential election, even if another candidate won an individual signatory's popular vote. As of 2021, it has not yet gone into force.

== Presidential elections ==
Key for parties
American Independent Party – (AI)
Democratic Party – (D)
Green Party – (G)
Independent candidate – (I)
Libertarian Party – (LI)
Reform Party – (RE)
Republican Party – (R)
Note – A double dagger (‡) indicates the national winner.

Presidential elections in Hawaii from 1960 to present
Year	Winner			Runner-up			Other candidate (Note: For purposes of these lists, other candidates are defined as those who were in third place in Hawaii.)			EV	Ref.
Year	Candidate	Votes	%	Candidate	Votes	%	Candidate	Votes	%	EV	Ref.
1960	John F. Kennedy (D) ‡	92,410	50.03%	Richard Nixon (R)	92,295	49.97%	–	–	–	3	
1964	Lyndon B. Johnson (D) ‡	163,249	78.76%	Barry Goldwater (R)	44,022	21.24%	–	–	–	4	
1968	Hubert Humphrey (D)	141,324	59.83%	Richard Nixon (R) ‡	91,425	38.70%	George Wallace (AI)	3,469	1.47%	4	
1972	Richard Nixon (R) ‡	168,865	62.48%	George McGovern (D)	101,409	37.52%	–	–	–	4	
1976	Jimmy Carter (D) ‡	147,375	50.59%	Gerald Ford (R)	140,003	48.06%	Roger MacBride (LI)	3,923	1.35%	4	
1980	Jimmy Carter (D)	135,879	44.80%	Ronald Reagan (R) ‡	130,112	42.90%	John B. Anderson (I)	32,021	10.56%	4	
1984	Ronald Reagan (R) ‡	185,050	55.10%	Walter Mondale (D)	147,154	43.82%	David Bergland (LI)	2,167	0.65%	4	
1988	Michael Dukakis (D)	192,364	54.27%	George H. W. Bush (R) ‡	158,625	44.75%	Ron Paul (LI)	1,999	0.56%	4	
1992	Bill Clinton (D) ‡	179,310	48.09%	George H. W. Bush (R)	136,822	36.70%	Ross Perot (I)	53,003	14.22%	4	
1996	Bill Clinton (D) ‡	205,012	56.93%	Bob Dole (R)	113,943	31.64%	Ross Perot (RE)	27,358	7.60%	4	
2000	Al Gore (D)	205,286	55.79%	George W. Bush (R) ‡	137,845	37.46%	Ralph Nader (G)	21,623	5.88%	4	
2004	John Kerry (D)	231,708	54.01%	George W. Bush (R) ‡	194,191	45.26%	David Cobb (G)	1,737	0.40%	4	
2008	Barack Obama (D) ‡	325,871	71.85%	John McCain (R)	120,566	26.58%	Ralph Nader (I)	3,825	0.84%	4	
2012	Barack Obama (D) ‡	306,658	70.55%	Mitt Romney (R)	121,015	27.84%	Gary Johnson (LI)	3,840	0.88%	4	
2016	Hillary Clinton (D)	266,891	62.22%	Donald Trump (R) ‡	128,847	30.04%	Gary Johnson (LI)	15,954	3.72%	4 (Note: A faithless Democratic elector voted for Bernie Sanders for president and Elizabeth Warren for vice president.)	
2020	Joe Biden (D) ‡	366,130	63.73%	Donald Trump (R)	196,864	34.27%	Jo Jorgensen (LI)	5,539	0.96%	4	
2024	Kamala Harris (D)	313,044	60.59%	Donald Trump (R) ‡	193,661	37.48%	Jill Stein (G)	4,387	0.85%	4	

=== Graph ===
View source data.

== See also ==
- Elections in Hawaii
- List of United States presidential election results by state

== Works cited ==
- Guide to U.S. Elections. SAGE Publications. 2010. ISBN 978-1-60426-536-1.
- Presidential elections, 1789–1996. Congressional Quarterly. 1997. ISBN 978-1-56802-065-5. LCCN 97019084. OL 673017M.
