= United States presidential elections in Alaska =

Alaska US presidential election result

Presidential elections in Alaska
- Number of elections: 17
- Voted Democratic: 1
- Voted Republican: 16
- Voted other: 0
- Voted for winning candidate: 10
- Voted for losing candidate: 7

Since Alaska's admission to the Union on January 3, 1959, it has participated in 17 United States presidential elections, always having 3 electoral votes. In the 1960 presidential election, Alaska was narrowly won by the Republican Party's candidate and incumbent vice president Richard Nixon, defeating the Democratic Party's candidate John F. Kennedy by a margin of just 1.88% (1,144 votes). In the 1964 presidential election, the Democratic Party's candidate Lyndon B. Johnson won Alaska in a national Democratic landslide victory. Since the 1964 election, Alaska has been won by the Republican Party in every presidential election. However, no Republican candidate has gotten 55% of the statewide vote since 2008. Donald Trump received 54.5% in 2024.

Ronald Reagan, the Republican candidate in the 1984 presidential election, won Alaska by 36.78%, which remains the largest margin of victory in the state's history. Ross Perot, the independent candidate in the 1992 presidential election, received the highest vote share (28.43%) ever won by a third-party candidate in Alaska. Various news organizations have characterized Alaska as a safe Republican state. No Republican has won the presidency without carrying Alaska since its statehood in 1959 due to Lyndon B. Johnson being the only Democratic candidate to ever carry the state. Alaska is tied with Idaho, Utah, Wyoming, North Dakota, South Dakota, Nebraska, Kansas and Oklahoma for the longest Republican voting streak for any state in recent political history, from 1968 to present.

== Presidential elections ==
Key for parties
American Independent Party – (AI)
Democratic Party – (D)
Green Party – (G)
Independent candidate – (I)
Libertarian Party – (LI)
Reform Party – (RE)
Republican Party – (R)
Note – A double dagger (‡) indicates the national winner.

Presidential elections in Alaska from 1960 to present
| Year | Winner | | | Runner-up | | | Other candidates (Note: For purposes of this list, other candidates are defined as those who were in third place in Alaska.) | | | EV | Ref. |
| Year | Candidate | Votes | % | Candidate | Votes | % | Candidate | Votes | % | EV | Ref. |
|---|---|---|---|---|---|---|---|---|---|---|---|
| 1960 | Richard Nixon (R) | 30,953 | 50.94% | John F. Kennedy (D) ‡ | 29,809 | 49.06% | – | – | – | 3 | |
| 1964 | Lyndon B. Johnson (D) ‡ | 44,329 | 65.91% | Barry Goldwater (R) | 22,930 | 34.09% | – | – | – | 3 | |
| 1968 | Richard Nixon (R) ‡ | 37,600 | 45.28% | Hubert Humphrey (D) | 35,411 | 42.65% | George Wallace (AI) | 10,024 | 12.07% | 3 | |
| 1972 | Richard Nixon (R) ‡ | 55,349 | 58.13% | George McGovern (D) | 32,967 | 34.62% | John G. Schmitz (AI) | 6,903 | 7.25% | 3 | |
| 1976 | Gerald Ford (R) | 71,555 | 57.90% | Jimmy Carter (D) ‡ | 44,058 | 35.65% | Roger MacBride (LI) | 6,785 | 5.49% | 3 | |
| 1980 | Ronald Reagan (R) ‡ | 86,112 | 54.35% | Jimmy Carter (D) | 41,842 | 26.41% | Ed Clark (LI) | 18,479 | 11.66% | 3 | |
| 1984 | Ronald Reagan (R) ‡ | 138,377 | 66.65% | Walter Mondale (D) | 62,007 | 29.87% | David Bergland (LI) | 6,378 | 3.07% | 3 | |
| 1988 | George H. W. Bush (R) ‡ | 119,251 | 59.59% | Michael Dukakis (D) | 72,584 | 36.27% | Ron Paul (LI) | 5,484 | 2.74% | 3 | |
| 1992 | George H. W. Bush (R) | 102,000 | 39.46% | Bill Clinton (D) ‡ | 78,294 | 30.29% | Ross Perot (I) | 73,481 | 28.43% | 3 | |
| 1996 | Bob Dole (R) | 122,746 | 50.80% | Bill Clinton (D) ‡ | 80,380 | 33.27% | Ross Perot (RE) | 26,333 | 10.90% | 3 | |
| 2000 | George W. Bush (R) ‡ | 167,398 | 58.62% | Al Gore (D) | 79,004 | 27.67% | Ralph Nader (G) | 28,747 | 10.07% | 3 | |
| 2004 | George W. Bush (R) ‡ | 190,889 | 61.07% | John Kerry (D) | 111,025 | 35.52% | Ralph Nader (I) | 5,069 | 1.62% | 3 | |
| 2008 | John McCain (R) | 193,841 | 59.42% | Barack Obama (D) ‡ | 123,594 | 37.89% | Ralph Nader (I) | 3,783 | 1.16% | 3 | |
| 2012 | Mitt Romney (R) | 164,676 | 54.80% | Barack Obama (D) ‡ | 122,640 | 40.81% | Gary Johnson (LI) | 7,392 | 2.46% | 3 | |
| 2016 | Donald Trump (R) ‡ | 163,387 | 51.28% | Hillary Clinton (D) | 116,454 | 36.55% | Gary Johnson (LI) | 18,725 | 5.88% | 3 | |
| 2020 | Donald Trump (R) | 189,951 | 52.83% | Joe Biden (D) ‡ | 153,778 | 42.77% | Jo Jorgensen (LI) | 8,897 | 2.47% | 3 | |
| 2024 | Donald Trump (R) ‡ | 184,458 | 54.54% | Kamala Harris (D) | 140,026 | 41.41% | Robert F. Kennedy Jr. (I) | 5,670 | 1.68% | 3 | |

=== Graph ===
The following graph shows the margin of victory of the winner over the runner-up in the 16 presidential elections Alaska participated.

View source data.

== See also ==
- Elections in Alaska
- List of United States presidential election results by state

== Works cited ==
- Guide to U.S. Elections. SAGE Publications. 2010. ISBN 978-1-60426-536-1.
- Presidential elections, 1789–1996. Congressional Quarterly. 1997. ISBN 978-1-56802-065-5. LCCN 97019084. OL 673017M.
