= 1980 United States presidential election in Alaska =

- November 4, 1980

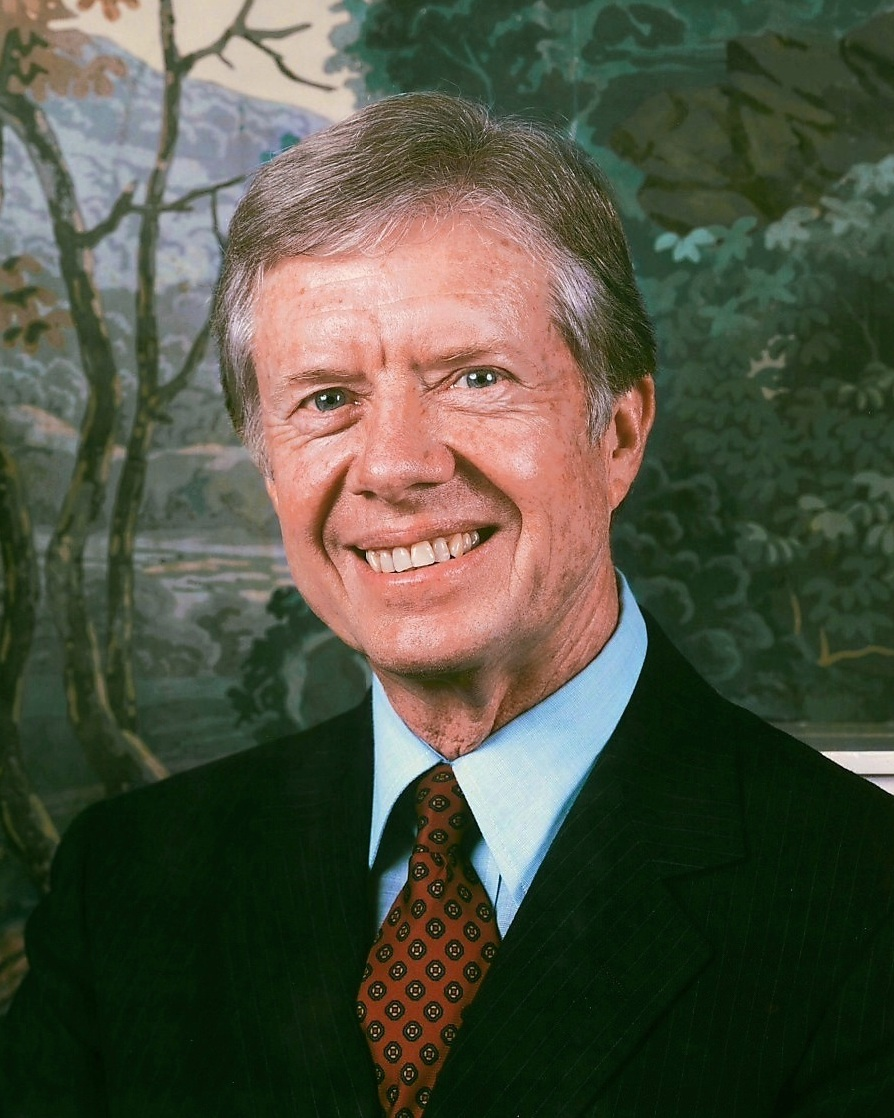

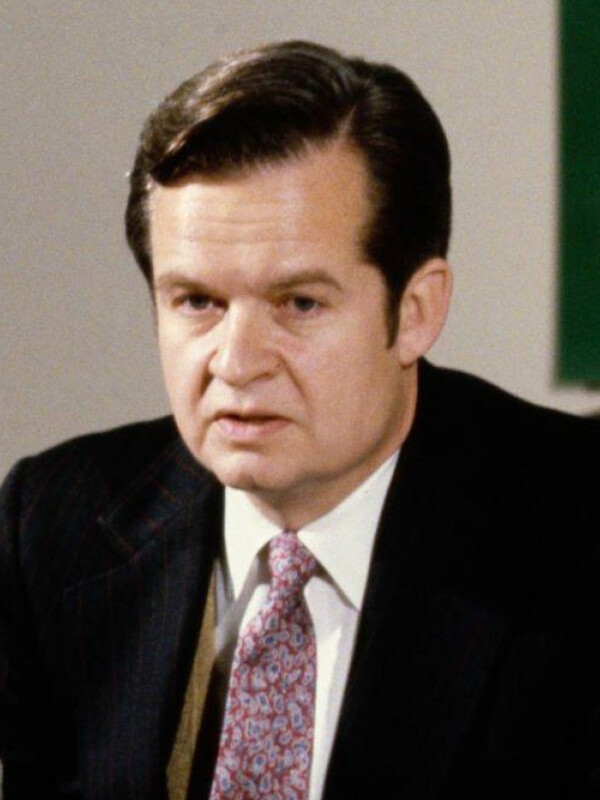

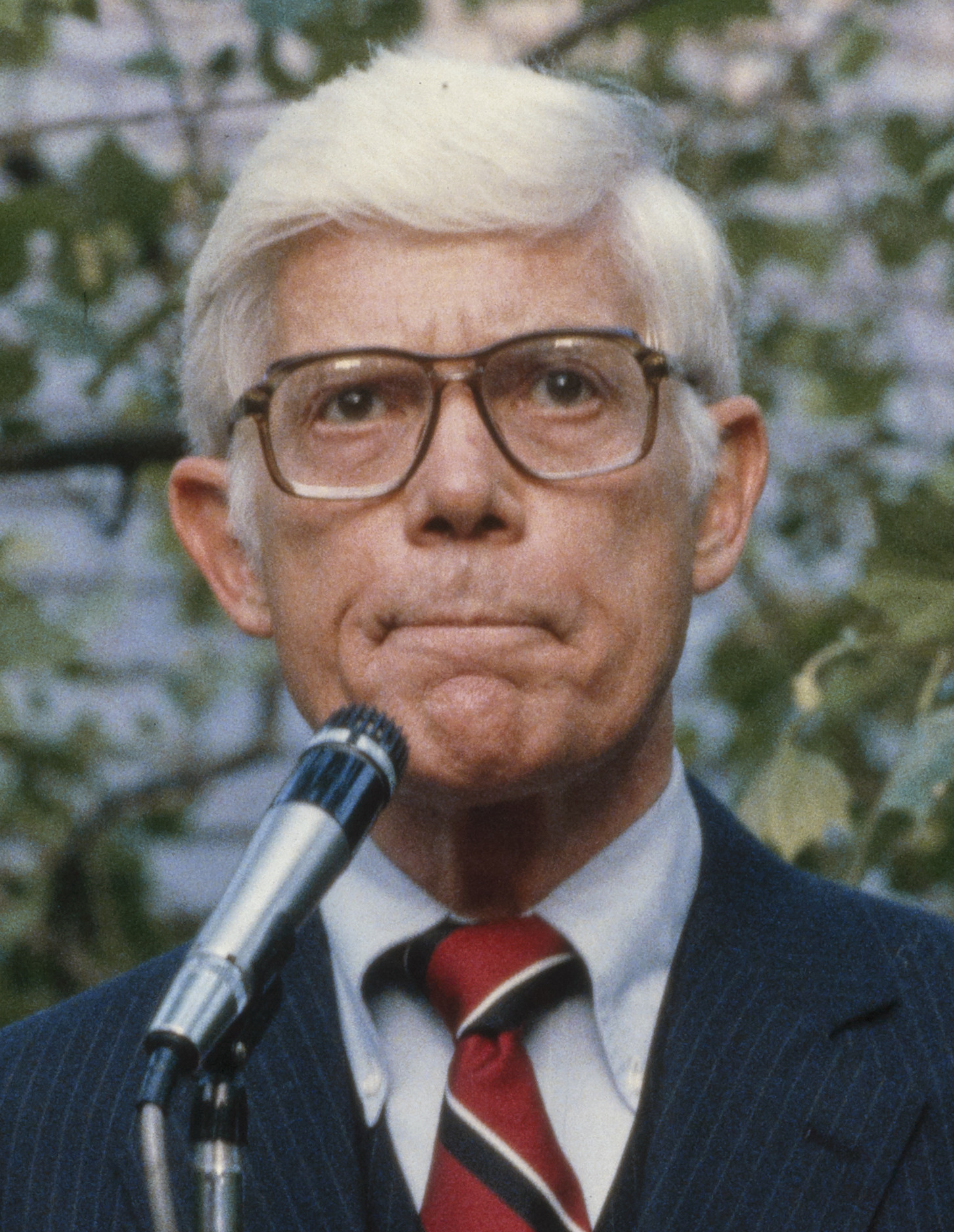
Nominee	Ronald Reagan	Jimmy Carter
Party	Republican	Democratic
Home state	California	Georgia
Running mate	George H. W. Bush	Walter Mondale
Electoral vote	3	0
Popular vote	86,112	41,842
Percentage	54.35%	26.41%
Nominee	Ed Clark	John B. Anderson
Party	Libertarian	Independent
Home state	California	Illinois
Running mate	David Koch	Patrick Lucey
Electoral vote	0	0
Popular vote	18,479	11,155
Percentage	11.66%	7.04%

Reagan
40–50%
50–60%
60–70%
Carter
40–50%
50–60%
60–70%
President before election
Jimmy Carter
Democratic
Elected President
Ronald Reagan
Republican

The 1980 United States presidential election in Alaska took place on November 4, 1980, as part of the nationwide presidential election. Voters chose three representatives, or electors, to the Electoral College, who voted for president and vice president.

Alaska was easily won by Ronald Reagan (R–CA) with 54.3% of the popular vote over incumbent President Jimmy Carter (D–GA)'s 26.4%. Alaska has only voted Democratic once in its history, in 1964 amidst a national Democratic landslide. With Reagan overwhelmingly winning the national election in 1980, the state fell safely into the Republican column.

Libertarian candidate Ed Clark had his strongest showing in Alaska and set the record for the best performance of a Libertarian presidential candidate on a statewide level. He also beat independent candidate John B. Anderson in this state, despite Anderson winning more votes than Clark nationally. In part due to the strong showings of both Clark and Anderson, Carter's vote share remains the lowest for any Democrat in Alaska history. Reagan was the first Republican to ever win without Yukon–Koyukuk Census Area, Northwest Arctic Borough, and Dillingham Census Area.

== Results ==
1980 United States presidential election in Alaska
Party	Candidate	Votes	Percentage	Electoral votes
Republican	Ronald Reagan	86,112	54.35%	3
Democratic	Jimmy Carter (inc.)	41,842	26.41%	0
Libertarian	Ed Clark	18,479	11.66%	0
Independent	John B. Anderson	11,155	7.04%	0
N/A	Write-in	857	0.54%	0
Totals		158,445	100.00%	3

=== By borough ===
Borough	Ronald Reagan Republican		Jimmy Carter Democratic		Ed Clark Libertarian		John B. Anderson Independent		Various candidates Other parties		Margin		Total votes cast
Borough	#	%	#	%	#	%	#	%	#	%	#	%	Total votes cast
Aleutians East	203	46.88%	145	33.49%	27	6.24%	56	12.93%	2	0.46%	58	13.39%	433
Aleutians West	461	46.99%	349	35.58%	44	4.49%	123	12.54%	4	0.40%	112	11.41%	981
Anchorage	38,956	59.10%	15,186	23.04%	6,973	10.58%	4,449	6.75%	352	0.53%	23,770	36.06%	65,916
Bethel	879	25.97%	2,044	60.38%	132	3.90%	322	9.51%	8	0.24%	-1,165	-34.41%	3,385
Bristol Bay	199	50.38%	131	33.16%	28	7.09%	37	9.37%	0	0.00%	68	17.22%	395
Denali	439	53.21%	182	22.06%	147	6.55%	54	17.82%	3	0.36%	257	31.15%	825
Dillingham	380	37.04%	479	46.69%	58	5.65%	106	10.33%	3	0.29%	-99	-9.65%	1,026
Fairbanks North Star	11,602	50.71%	5,294	23.14%	1,295	5.66%	4,480	19.58%	210	0.91%	6,308	27.57%	22,881
Haines	449	62.80%	161	22.52%	37	5.17%	55	7.69%	13	1.82%	288	40.28%	715
Hoonah-Angoon	323	33.75%	484	50.57%	54	5.64%	90	9.40%	6	0.64%	-161	-16.82%	957
Juneau	4,635	45.13%	3,578	34.84%	768	7.48%	1,179	11.48%	109	1.07%	1,057	10.29%	10,269
Kenai Peninsula	7,031	60.69%	2,160	18.64%	560	4.83%	1,800	15.54%	34	0.30%	4,871	42.05%	11,585
Ketchikan Gateway	2,809	58.19%	1,336	27.68%	334	6.92%	334	6.92%	14	0.29%	1,473	30.51%	4,827
Kodiak Island	1,600	47.92%	1,017	30.46%	423	12.67%	284	8.51%	15	0.44%	583	17.46%	3,339
Kusilvak	376	27.15%	854	61.63%	52	3.73%	102	7.36%	2	0.13%	-478	-34.48%	1,386
Lake and Peninsula	214	51.07%	141	33.65%	27	6.44%	35	8.35%	2	0.49%	73	17.42%	419
Matanuska-Susitna	5,008	61.25%	1,316	16.10%	1,435	17.55%	402	4.92%	15	0.18%	3,573	43.70%	8,176
Nome	933	43.17%	958	44.33%	98	4.53%	168	7.77%	4	0.20%	-25	-1.16%	2,161
North Slope	504	43.34%	466	40.07%	54	4.64%	135	11.61%	4	0.34%	38	3.27%	1,163
Northwest Arctic	594	40.03%	719	48.45%	61	4.11%	106	7.14%	4	0.27%	-125	-8.42%	1,484
Petersburg	711	52.24%	417	30.64%	69	5.07%	160	11.76%	4	0.29%	294	21.60%	1,361
Prince of Wales-Hyder	766	48.48%	577	36.52%	85	5.38%	140	8.86%	12	0.76%	189	11.96%	1,580
Sitka	1,853	52.75%	1,211	34.47%	141	4.01%	294	8.37%	14	0.40%	642	18.28%	3,513
Skagway	184	47.92%	128	33.33%	28	7.29%	42	10.94%	2	0.52%	56	14.59%	384
Southeast Fairbanks	1,129	57.60%	407	20.77%	314	16.02%	110	5.61%	0	0.00%	722	36.83%	1,960
Valdez-Cordova	2,179	60.58%	679	18.88%	510	14.18%	215	5.98%	14	0.38%	1,500	41.70%	3,597
Wrangell	601	57.29%	312	29.74%	55	5.24%	77	7.34%	4	0.39%	289	27.55%	1,049
Yakutat	116	49.57%	76	32.48%	14	5.98%	25	10.68%	3	1.29%	40	17.09%	234
Yukon-Koyukuk	977	39.99%	1,034	42.33%	229	9.37%	197	8.06%	6	0.25%	-57	-2.34%	2,443
Totals	86,112	54.35%	41,842	26.41%	18,479	11.66%	11,155	7.04%	857	0.54%	44,270	27.94%	158,445

=== Boroughs and Census Areas that flipped from Republican to Democratic ===
- Nome Census Area
- Yukon-Kuyokuk Census Area
- Dillingham Census Area

==== Boroughs and Census Areas that flipped from Democratic to Republican ====
- North Slope Borough
- Yakutat

== See also ==
- United States presidential elections in Alaska
