= 1968 United States presidential election in Alaska =

- November 5, 1968
- Turnout: 49.9% (voting age)

| Nominee | Richard Nixon | Hubert Humphrey | George Wallace |
| Party | Republican | Democratic | Independent |
| Alliance | | | American Independent |
| Home state | New York (Note: Although Nixon was born in California and although he served as a U.S. senator from California, in 1968 his official state of residence was New York, because he moved there to practice law after his defeat in the 1962 California gubernatorial election. During his first term as president, he re-established his residency in California. Consequently, most reliable reference books list Nixon's home state as New York in the 1968 election and his home state as California in the 1972 (and 1960) election.) | Minnesota | Alabama |
| Running mate | Spiro Agnew | Edmund Muskie | Curtis LeMay |
| Electoral vote | 3 | 0 | 0 |
| Popular vote | 37,600 | 35,411 | 10,024 |
| Percentage | 45.28% | 42.65% | 12.07% |

Nixon
40–50%
50–60%
Humphrey
40–50%
50–60%
60–70%
President before election
Lyndon Johnson
Democratic
Elected President
Richard Nixon
Republican

The 1968 United States presidential election in Alaska took place on November 5, 1968, as part of the nationwide presidential election. Voters chose three representatives, or electors to the Electoral College, who voted for president and vice president.

Alaska was won by Richard Nixon (R-New York) with 45.3 percent of the popular vote against incumbent Vice President Hubert Humphrey (D-Minnesota) with 42.6 percent. Nixon ultimately won the national vote as well, defeating Humphrey and becoming the next President. Former and future Governor George Wallace (D-Alabama) ran under the American Independent Party ticket, which favored continuing racial segregation within public schools in addition to most other areas of society throughout the Southern United States.

Wallace received over 12% of the vote in Alaska, unusually well for a state so far removed from his strongholds in the Deep South. This would begin Alaska's reputation as a state where third party candidates of differing political persuasions do relatively well.

In Alaska, voters were more concerned with Alaska oriented issues rather than those seen in the continental United States. The 1968 elections held in Alaska had higher levels of turnout than previous elections when it was a state.

== Results ==
1968 United States presidential election in Alaska
| Party | Candidate | Votes | Percentage | Electoral votes |
|---|---|---|---|---|
| Republican | Richard Nixon | 37,600 | 45.28% | 3 |
| Democratic | Hubert Humphrey | 35,411 | 42.65% | 0 |
| American Independent | George Wallace | 10,024 | 12.07% | 0 |
| Totals | | 83,035 | 100.00% | 3 |

=== By borough ===
| Borough | Richard Nixon Republican | | Hubert Humphrey Democratic | | George Wallace American Independent | | Margin | | Total votes cast |
| Borough | # | % | # | % | # | % | # | % | Total votes cast |
|---|---|---|---|---|---|---|---|---|---|
| Aleutians East | 160 | 50.79% | 120 | 38.10% | 35 | 11.11% | 40 | 12.69% | 315 |
| Aleutians West | 188 | 50.13% | 165 | 44.00% | 22 | 5.87% | 23 | 6.13% | 375 |
| Anchorage | 13,833 | 45.10% | 13,005 | 42.40% | 3,831 | 12.50% | 828 | 2.70% | 30,669 |
| Bethel | 939 | 39.29% | 1,293 | 54.10% | 158 | 6.61% | -354 | -14.81% | 2,390 |
| Bristol Bay | 127 | 44.10% | 122 | 42.36% | 39 | 13.54% | 5 | 1.74% | 288 |
| Denali | 282 | 45.78% | 197 | 31.98% | 137 | 22.24% | 85 | 13.80% | 616 |
| Dillingham | 340 | 49.93% | 320 | 46.99% | 21 | 3.08% | 20 | 2.94% | 681 |
| Fairbanks North Star | 4,270 | 47.00% | 3,435 | 37.81% | 1,381 | 15.19% | 835 | 9.19% | 9,086 |
| Haines | 231 | 50.00% | 155 | 33.55% | 76 | 16.45% | 76 | 16.45% | 462 |
| Hoonah-Angoon | 272 | 43.38% | 322 | 51.36% | 33 | 5.26% | -50 | -7.98% | 627 |
| Juneau | 2,532 | 44.70% | 2,770 | 48.91% | 362 | 6.39% | -238 | -4.21% | 5,664 |
| Kenai Peninsula | 2,042 | 39.36% | 2,166 | 41.75% | 980 | 18.89% | -124 | -2.39% | 5,188 |
| Ketchikan Gateway | 1,765 | 49.59% | 1,342 | 37.71% | 452 | 12.70% | 423 | 11.88% | 3,559 |
| Kodiak Island | 987 | 47.11% | 861 | 41.10% | 247 | 11.79% | 126 | 6.01% | 2,095 |
| Kusilvak | 274 | 30.55% | 559 | 62.32% | 64 | 7.13% | -285 | -31.77% | 897 |
| Lake and Peninsula | 195 | 44.72% | 189 | 43.35% | 52 | 11.93% | 6 | 1.37% | 436 |
| Matanuska-Susitna | 1,076 | 46.42% | 892 | 38.48% | 350 | 15.10% | 184 | 7.94% | 2,318 |
| Nome | 817 | 44.21% | 929 | 50.27% | 102 | 5.52% | -112 | -6.06% | 1,848 |
| North Slope | 473 | 34.91% | 690 | 50.92% | 192 | 14.18% | -217 | -16.01% | 1,355 |
| Northwest Arctic | 501 | 49.36% | 467 | 46.01% | 47 | 4.63% | 34 | 3.35% | 1,015 |
| Petersburg | 438 | 46.70% | 447 | 47.65% | 53 | 5.65% | -9 | -0.95% | 938 |
| Prince of Wales-Hyder | 524 | 43.49% | 604 | 50.12% | 77 | 6.39% | -80 | -6.63% | 1,205 |
| Sitka | 1,023 | 44.29% | 1,148 | 49.70% | 139 | 6.01% | -125 | -5.41% | 2,310 |
| Skagway | 95 | 35.19% | 155 | 57.41% | 20 | 7.40% | -60 | -22.22% | 270 |
| Southeast Fairbanks | 454 | 49.13% | 287 | 31.06% | 183 | 19.81% | 167 | 18.07% | 924 |
| Valdez-Cordova | 878 | 48.91% | 635 | 35.38% | 282 | 15.71% | 243 | 13.53% | 1,795 |
| Wrangell | 365 | 50.91% | 305 | 42.54% | 47 | 6.55% | 60 | 8.37% | 717 |
| Yakutat | 78 | 39.00% | 102 | 51.00% | 20 | 10.00% | -24 | -12.00% | 200 |
| Yukon-Koyukuk | 1,439 | 49.30% | 1,173 | 40.18% | 307 | 10.52% | 266 | 9.12% | 2,919 |
| Totals | 37,600 | 45.28% | 35,411 | 42.65% | 10,024 | 12.07% | 2,189 | 2.63% | 83,085 |

=== Boroughs and Census Areas that flipped from Democratic to Republican ===
- Aleutians East Census Area
- Aleutians West Census Area
- Anchorage
- Lake & Peninsula Borough
- Bristol Bay Borough
- Dilingham Census Area
- Kodiak Island Borough
- Northwest Arctic Borough
- Yukon–Koyukuk Census Area
- Fairbanks North Star
- Southeast Fairbanks Census Area
- Denali Borough
- Matanuska-Susitna Borough
- Haines Borough
- Wrangell
- Ketchikan Gateway Borough
- Valdez–Cordova Census Area

== Analysis ==
Alaska has only voted Democratic once, and that was in the previous 1964 election for incumbent President Lyndon B. Johnson, who did not run for re-election; nonetheless, during the state's first four presidential elections Alaska was little or no more Republican than the nation at-large. Nixon's 45.28 percent stood 1.86 percent above his national figure and Humphrey's 42.65 percent was a trifling 0.07 percent below his national total. This is the last time Democrats carried Kenai Peninsula and Petersburg. This was the last time Alaska voted to the left of Iowa until 2024.

Despite Alaska lying at the opposite end of the country from Wallace's support base in the Deep South, he did not fare badly in the relatively heavily populated areas of Anchorage, the Kenai Peninsula, and the Susitna Valley. In fact, in Kenai Peninsula Borough, Wallace managed to receive over twenty percent of the vote.

Wallace's 12.07 percent of Alaska's vote was 1.46 percent below his percentage for the nation at large, but nonetheless his third-greatest outside antebellum slave states (Note: Wallace's share here was also larger than his 9.62 percent in the border state of West Virginia.) and Oklahoma, (Note: Oklahoma was not a state until 1907 but did have slavery as a territory before 1865.) behind 13.25 percent in Nevada and 12.55 percent in Idaho.

== See also ==
- United States presidential elections in Alaska
