= 2000 United States presidential election in Alaska =

- November 7, 2000

Nominee	George W. Bush	Al Gore	Ralph Nader
Party	Republican	Democratic	Green
Home state	Texas	Tennessee	Connecticut
Running mate	Dick Cheney	Joe Lieberman	Winona LaDuke
Electoral vote	3	0	0
Popular vote	167,398	79,004	28,747
Percentage	58.62%	27.67%	10.07%

Bush
40–50%
50–60%
60–70%
70–80%
Gore
40–50%
President before election
Bill Clinton
Democratic
Elected President
George W. Bush
Republican

The 2000 United States presidential election in Alaska took place on November 7, 2000, and was part of the 2000 United States presidential election. Voters chose 3 representatives, or electors to the Electoral College, who voted for president and vice president.

Alaska was won by Governor George W. Bush by a 31.0% margin of victory. Green Party nominee Ralph Nader had his best performance there in 2000, obtaining over 10% of the vote. Al Gore received 28% of the vote.

This is the most recent election in which Sitka, Skagway, and Juneau voted for the Republican candidate. Hoonah–Angoon Census Area voted for the Republican candidate for the only time in the state's history. Bush's winning margin of over 88,000 votes is the largest in history for a presidential candidate in Alaska.

== General election ==
=== Polling ===
Poll source	Date(s)	Sample size	Margin of error	George W. Bush (R)	Al Gore (D)	Ralph Nader (G)	Other / undecided (Note: Calculated by taking the difference of 100% and all other candidates combined.)
Harris Insights & Analytics	November 3, 2000	756	—	54%	31%	10%	5%

=== Results ===
2000 United States presidential election in Alaska
Party	Candidate	Votes	Percentage	Electoral votes
Republican	George W. Bush	167,398	58.62%	3
Democratic	Al Gore	79,004	27.67%	0
Green	Ralph Nader	28,747	10.07%	0
Reform	Patrick Buchanan	5,192	1.82%	0
Libertarian	Harry Browne	2,636	0.92%	0
Independent	Write Ins	1,068	0.37%	0
Natural Law	John Hagelin	919	0.32%	0
Constitution	Howard Phillips	596	0.21%	0
Totals		285,560	100.00%	3
Voter turnout (voting age)				60%

Boroughs and census areas that flipped from Democratic to Republican

- Aleutians West Census Area (largest town: Unalaska)
- Dillingham Census Area (largest town: Dillingham)
- Juneau
- Lake and Peninsula Borough (largest town: Port Alsworth)
- Nome Census Area (largest town: Nome)
- Northwest Arctic Borough (largest town: Kotzebue)
- Skagway
- Hoonah–Angoon Census Area (largest town: Hoonah)
- Kusilvak Census Area (largest town: Hooper Bay)
- Yakutat
- Yukon-Koyukuk Census Area (largest town: Fort Yukon)

==== By congressional district ====
Due to the state's low population, Alaska only has only one at-large congressional district, whose results are equivalent to the statewide totals.

District	Bush	Gore	Representative
At-large	58.6%	27.7%	Don Young

== Electors ==
Technically the voters of Alaska cast their ballots for electors: representatives to the Electoral College. Alaska is allocated 3 electors because it has 1 congressional districts and 2 senators. All candidates who appear on the ballot or qualify to receive write-in votes must submit a list of 3 electors, who pledge to vote for their candidate and their running mate. Whoever wins the majority of votes in the state is awarded all 3 electoral votes. Their chosen electors then vote for president and vice president. Although electors are pledged to their candidate and running mate, they are not obligated to vote for them. An elector who votes for someone other than their candidate is known as a faithless elector.

The electors of each state and the District of Columbia met on December 18, 2000, to cast their votes for president and vice president. The Electoral College itself never meets as one body. Instead the electors from each state and the District of Columbia met in their respective capitols.

The following were the members of the Electoral College from the state. All were pledged to and voted for George W. Bush and Dick Cheney:

1. Bill Allen
2. Susan Fischetti
3. Lucy Groh

== See also ==
- United States presidential elections in Alaska
