= 1996 United States presidential election in Alaska =

- November 5, 1996

Nominee	Bob Dole	Bill Clinton	Ross Perot
Party	Republican	Democratic	Reform
Home state	Kansas	Arkansas	Texas
Running mate	Jack Kemp	Al Gore	Pat Choate
Electoral vote	3	0	0
Popular vote	122,746	80,380	26,333
Percentage	50.80%	33.27%	10.90%

Dole
40–50%
50–60%
60–70%
Clinton
30–40%
40–50%
50–60%
President before election
Bill Clinton
Democratic
Elected President
Bill Clinton
Democratic

The 1996 United States presidential election in Alaska took place on November 7, 1996, as part of the 1996 United States presidential election. Voters chose representatives, or electors to the Electoral College, who voted for president and vice president.

Alaska was won by Senator Bob Dole (R-KS), with Dole winning 50.80% to 33.27% over President Bill Clinton (D) by a margin of 17.53%. Billionaire businessman Ross Perot (Reform-TX) finished in third, with 10.9% of the popular vote.

With 50.8% of the popular vote, Alaska proved to be Dole's fifth strongest state in the 1996 election after Utah, Kansas, Nebraska and Idaho.

Among white voters, 50% supported Dole, while 34% supported Clinton. 12% supported Perot.

== Results ==
1996 United States presidential election in Alaska
Party	Candidate	Running mate	Votes	Percentage	Electoral votes
Republican	Robert Dole	Jack Kemp	122,746	50.80%	3
Democratic	Bill Clinton (incumbent)	Al Gore (incumbent)	80,380	33.27%	0
Reform	Ross Perot	Patrick Choate	26,333	10.90%	0
Green Party	Ralph Nader	Winona LaDuke	7,597	3.14%	0
Libertarian	Harry Browne	Jo Jorgensen	2,276	0.94%	0
U.S. Taxpayers' Party	Howard Phillips	Herbert Titus	925	0.38%	0
Natural Law	John Hagelin	Mike Tompkins	729	0.30%	0
Write-ins			634	0.26%	0
Totals			241,620	100.0%	3

Boroughs and Census Areas that flipped from Democratic to Republican

- Haines Borough
- North Slope Borough
- Prince of Wales-Hyder Census Area

Boroughs that flipped from Independent to Republican

- Denali Borough

Boroughs and Census Areas that flipped from Republican to Democratic

- Aleutians West Census Area
- Bethel Census Area
- Dillingham Census Area
- Kusilvak Census Area
- Lake and Peninsula Borough
- Northwest Arctic Borough
- Skagway
- Yakutat

=== By congressional district ===
Due to the state's low population, Alaska only has only one at-large congressional district, whose results are equivalent to the statewide totals.

District	Dole	Clinton	Representative
At-large	50.80%	33.27%	Don Young

== See also ==
- United States presidential elections in Alaska
