= 1964 United States presidential election in Alaska =

- November 3, 1964

Nominee	Lyndon B. Johnson	Barry Goldwater
Party	Democratic	Republican
Home state	Texas	Arizona
Running mate	Hubert Humphrey	William E. Miller
Electoral vote	3	0
Popular vote	44,329	22,930
Percentage	65.91%	34.09%

Johnson
50–60%
60–70%
70–80%
80–90%
90–100%
Goldwater
50–60%
60–70%
70–80%
Other
Tie
No Votes
President before election
Lyndon B. Johnson
Democratic
Elected President
Lyndon B. Johnson
Democratic

The 1964 United States presidential election in Alaska took place on November 3, 1964, as part of the nationwide presidential election. Voters chose three representatives, or electors to the Electoral College, who voted for president and vice president.

Alaska was won by incumbent President Lyndon B. Johnson (D-Texas) with 65.9% of the popular vote against U.S. Senator Barry Goldwater (R-Arizona) with 34.1%. Johnson won the national vote as well, defeating Goldwater and serving a full term after finishing the assassinated John F. Kennedy's term.

Johnson's victory in Alaska is the first and only time a Democrat has carried the state, which came amidst a landslide victory in the rest of the country (except for the Deep South and Goldwater's home state of Arizona), and partially because during its first four presidential elections Alaska was not anomalously Republican relative to the nation at-large. The state would become and remain very strongly Republican from 1972 onwards. This is also the only time a candidate swept every Borough and Census Area in Alaska.

== Results ==
1964 United States presidential election in Alaska
Party	Candidate	Votes	Percentage	Electoral votes
Democratic	Lyndon B. Johnson (incumbent)	44,329	65.91%	3
Republican	Barry Goldwater	22,930	34.09%	0
Totals		67,259	100.00%	3

=== By borough ===
Borough	Lyndon B. Johnson Democratic		Barry Goldwater Republican		Margin		Total votes cast
Borough	#	%	#	%	#	%	Total votes cast
Aleutians East	281	82.40%	60	17.60%	221	64.80%	341
Aleutians West	315	89.24%	38	10.76%	277	78.48%	353
Anchorage	13,537	59.93%	9,051	40.07%	4,486	19.86%	22,588
Bethel	1,649	86.52%	257	13.48%	1,392	73.04%	1,906
Bristol Bay	194	78.23%	54	21.77%	140	56.46%	248
Denali	311	56.44%	240	43.56%	71	12.88%	551
Dillingham	517	76.82%	156	23.18%	361	53.64%	673
Fairbanks North Star	4,825	57.87%	3,512	42.13%	1,313	15.74%	8,337
Haines	245	76.80%	74	23.20%	171	53.60%	319
Hoonah-Angoon	605	87.05%	90	12.95%	515	74.10%	695
Juneau	3,763	70.91%	1,544	29.09%	2,219	41.82%	5,307
Kenai Peninsula	2,301	64.54%	1,264	35.46%	1,037	29.08%	3,565
Ketchikan Gateway	2,276	62.51%	1,365	37.49%	911	25.02%	3,641
Kodiak Island	1,183	74.78%	399	25.22%	784	49.56%	1,582
Kusilvak	635	89.19%	77	10.81%	558	78.38%	712
Lake and Peninsula	356	81.09%	83	18.91%	273	62.18%	439
Matanuska-Susitna	1,241	56.28%	964	43.72%	277	12.56%	2,205
Nome	1,327	76.40%	410	23.60%	917	52.80%	1,737
North Slope	789	76.45%	243	23.55%	546	52.90%	1,032
Northwest Arctic	630	80.15%	156	19.85%	474	60.30%	786
Petersburg	727	76.77%	220	23.23%	507	53.54%	947
Prince of Wales-Hyder	923	80.68%	221	19.32%	702	61.36%	1,144
Sitka	1,571	71.41%	629	28.59%	942	42.82%	2,200
Skagway	261	77.68%	75	22.32%	186	55.36%	336
Southeast Fairbanks	530	67.26%	258	32.74%	272	34.52%	788
Valdez-Cordova	990	66.67%	495	33.33%	495	33.34%	1,485
Wrangell	494	70.17%	210	29.83%	284	40.34%	704
Yakutat	119	78.81%	32	21.19%	87	57.62%	151
Yukon-Koyukuk	1,750	70.39%	736	29.61%	1,014	40.78%	2,486
Totals	44,329	65.91%	22,930	34.09%	21,399	31.82%	67,259

=== Boroughs and Census Areas that flipped from Republican to Democratic ===
- Anchorage
- Bethel Census Area
- Haines Borough
- Juneau
- Northwest Arctic Borough
- Nome Census Area
- Matanuska-Susitna Borough
- Southeast Fairbanks Census Area
- Petersburg Borough
- Wrangell
- Ketchikan Gateway Borough

== Analysis ==
Despite Johnson's landslide, Alaska came out of the 1964 election as 4.63 percent more Democratic than the nation at large on a two-party basis, and Johnson's 31-point margin is the second-largest by a presidential candidate of either party, only surpassed by Ronald Reagan in his 1984 landslide. This is also the only time any presidential candidate has won every single borough in the state. Had Goldwater won the state, Alaska would have never voted Democratic, and it would constitute the Republicans' longest voting streak up to the present day.

As of the 2024 presidential election, this is the only time that Matanuska-Susitna, Wrangell, Southeast Fairbanks Census Area, and Ketchikan Gateway voted for a Democratic candidate. The Aleutians East, Bristol Bay, Fairbanks North Star, Kodiak Island, and Denali have also not voted Democratic since. Dillingham and Yukon–Koyukuk Census Areas would not vote for the Democratic candidate again until 1980, Haines Borough would not vote for the Democratic candidate again until 1992, Aleutians West Census Area and Lake and Peninsula Borough would not vote for the Democratic candidate again until 1996, and Anchorage would not vote for the Democratic candidate again until 2020.

Alaska was one of three states that voted with a certain party for the first time in this election, the other two being Vermont (which also had never gone to a Democrat before) and Georgia (which hadn't gone to a Republican before)--though these two had been states for much longer than Alaska, which had only participated in one previous presidential contest, and broke a streak lasting more than a century.

== See also ==
- United States presidential elections in Alaska
