= Chignik Airport =

Airport in Alaska, United States

- IATA: KCG; ICAO: PAJC; FAA LID: AJC

Summary
- Airport type: Public
- Owner: Alaska DOT&PF - Central Region
- Serves: Chignik, Alaska
- Elevation AMSL: 18 ft (5.5 m)
- Coordinates: 56°18′41″N 158°22′24″W

Map
- Location of airport in Alaska

Runways
Direction	Length		Surface
Direction	ft	m	Surface
2/20	2,600	792	Gravel

Statistics (2015)
- Aircraft operations: 2,120 (2013)
- Based aircraft: 0
- Passengers: 495
- Freight: 85,000 lbs
- Source: Federal Aviation Administration

Chignik Airport (IATA: KCG, ICAO: PAJC, FAA LID: AJC) is a state-owned, public-use airport two nautical miles (3.7 km) northeast of the central business district of Chignik, a city in the Lake and Peninsula Borough of the U.S. state of Alaska.

As per Federal Aviation Administration records, this airport had 800 commercial passenger boardings (enplanements) in calendar year 2008, a decrease of 21% from the 1,017 enplanements in 2007. Chignik Airport is included in the FAA's National Plan of Integrated Airport Systems (2009–2013), which categorizes it as a general aviation facility.

== Facilities and aircraft ==
Chignik Airport has one runway designated 2/20 with a gravel surface measuring 2,600 by 60 feet (792 x 18 m). The airport is unattended. For the 12-month period ending January 31, 2008, the airport had 2,120 aircraft operations, an average of 176 per month: 67% air taxi and 33% general aviation.

== Airlines and destinations ==
Airlines	Destinations
Grant Aviation	Chignik Lagoon, Chignik Lake, King Salmon, Perryville, Port Heiden

=== Statistics ===
Carrier shares: January – December 2015
Carrier	Passengers (arriving and departing)
Grant	495(100.00%)

Top domestic destinations: January – December 2015
Rank	City	Airport	Passengers	Carriers
1	(Alaska) King Salmon, AK	King Salmon Airport	160	
2	(Alaska) Chignik Lake, AK	Chignik Lake Airport	30	Grant
3	(Alaska) Perryville, AK	Perryville Airport	20	
4	(Alaska) Port Heiden, AK	Port Heiden Airport	20	
5	(Alaska) Chignik Lagoon, AK	Chignik Lagoon Airport	20	Grant
6	(Alaska) Dillingham, AK	Dillingham Airport	10	
3	(Alaska) South Naknek, AK	South Naknek Airport	10	

== See also ==
- Chignik Bay Seaplane Base (IATA: KBW, FAA LID: Z78)
- Chignik Fisheries Airport (IATA: ~~KCG~~, FAA LID: ~~KCG~~)
- Chignik Lagoon Airport (IATA: KCL, FAA LID: KCL)
- Chignik Lake Airport (IATA: KCQ, FAA LID: A79)
- List of airports in Alaska
