= Chignik Lake Airport =

Airport in Alaska, United States

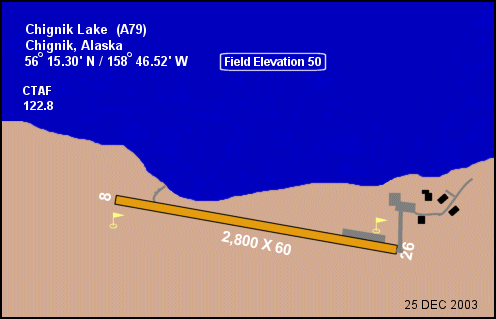
- IATA: KCQ; ICAO: none; FAA LID: A79

Summary
- Airport type: Public
- Owner: State of Alaska DOT&PF - Central Region
- Serves: Chignik Lake, Alaska
- Elevation AMSL: 50 ft (15 m)
- Coordinates: 56°15′18″N 158°46′31″W

Map
- Location of airport in Alaska

Runways
Direction	Length		Surface
Direction	ft	m	Surface
8/26	2,800	853	Gravel

Statistics (2015)
- Aircraft operations: 720 (2013)
- Based aircraft: 0
- Passengers: 452
- Freight: 98,000 lbs
- Source: Federal Aviation Administration

Chignik Lake Airport (IATA: KCQ, FAA LID: A79) is a state-owned, public-use airport located at Chignik Lake, in the Lake and Peninsula Borough of the U.S. state of Alaska.

This airport is included in the FAA's National Plan of Integrated Airport Systems (2009–2013), which categorizes it as a general aviation facility. Scheduled airline service to King Salmon Airport is provided by Peninsula Airways (PenAir).

== Airlines and destinations ==
Airlines	Destinations
Grant Aviation	Chignik, Chignik Lagoon, King Salmon, Perryville, Port Heiden, Ugashik Bay

=== Statistics ===
Carrier shares: January – December 2015
Carrier	Passengers (arriving and departing)
Grant	452(100.00%)

Top domestic destinations: January – December 2015
Rank	City	Airport	Passengers
1	(Alaska) King Salmon, AK	King Salmon Airport	100
2	(Alaska) Perryville, AK	Perryville Airport	50
3	(Alaska) Chignik Lagoon, AK	Chignik Lagoon Airport	30
4	(Alaska) Port Heiden, AK	Port Heiden Airport	20

== Facilities and aircraft ==
Chignik Lake Airport has one runway designated 8/26 with a gravel surface measuring 2,800 by 60 feet (853 x 18 m). For the 12-month period ending July 31, 2005, the airport had 720 aircraft operations, an average of 60 per month: 69% air taxi and 31% general aviation. The airport is unattended.

== See also ==
- Chignik Airport (IATA: KCG, ICAO: PAJC, FAA LID: AJC)
- Chignik Bay Seaplane Base (IATA: KBW, FAA LID: Z78)
- Chignik Fisheries Airport (IATA: ~~KCG~~, FAA LID: ~~KCG~~)
- Chignik Lagoon Airport (IATA: KCL, FAA LID: KCL)
- List of airports in Alaska
