= Chignik Lagoon Airport =

Airport in Alaska, United States

Chignik Lagoon Airport Chignik Flats Airport
- IATA: KCL; ICAO: none; FAA LID: KCL

Summary
- Airport type: Public
- Owner: Alaska DOT&PF
- Serves: Chignik Lagoon, Alaska
- Elevation AMSL: 25 ft (7.6 m)
- Coordinates: 56°18′40″N 158°32′03″W

Map
- Location of airport in Alaska

Runways
Direction	Length		Surface
Direction	ft	m	Surface
4/22	2,200	671	Gravel/dirt

Statistics (2015)
- Aircraft operations: 1,800 (2014)
- Based aircraft: 0
- Passengers: 252
- Freight: 113,000 lbs
- Source: Federal Aviation Administration

Chignik Lagoon Airport (IATA: KCL, FAA LID: KCL) is a state-owned, public-use airport serving Chignik Lagoon, in the Lake and Peninsula Borough of the U.S. state of Alaska. It is also known as Chignik Flats Airport. Scheduled airline service to King Salmon Airport is provided by Grant Aviation.

As per Federal Aviation Administration records, this airport had 566 commercial passenger boardings (enplanements) in calendar year 2008, an increase of 5% from the 538 enplanements in 2007. Chignik Lagoon Airport is included in the FAA's National Plan of Integrated Airport Systems (2009–2013), which categorizes it as a general aviation facility.

== Airlines and destinations ==
Airlines	Destinations
Grant Aviation	Chignik, Chignik Lake, King Salmon, Perryville, Port Heiden

=== Statistics ===
Carrier shares: January – December 2015
Carrier	Passengers (arriving and departing)
Grant	252(100.00%)

Top domestic destinations: January – December 2015
Rank	City	Airport	Passengers
1	(Alaska) King Salmon, AK	King Salmon Airport	60
2	(Alaska) Chignik, AK	Chignik Airport	30
3	(Alaska) Perryville, AK	Perryville Airport	10
	(Alaska) Port Heiden, AK	Port Heiden Airport	10

== Facilities and aircraft ==
Chignik Lagoon Airport has one runway designated 4/22 with a gravel surface measuring 1,810 by 60 feet (552 x 18 m). Previously, the runway was 1,600 feet (488 m) long and designated 3/21. For the 12-month period ending December 21, 2007, the airport had 1,800 aircraft operations, an average of 150 per month: 61% air taxi and 39% general aviation.

== See also ==
- Chignik Airport (IATA: KCG, ICAO: PAJC, FAA LID: AJC)
- Chignik Bay Seaplane Base (IATA: KBW, FAA LID: Z78)
- Chignik Fisheries Airport (IATA: ~~KCG~~, FAA LID: ~~KCG~~)
- Chignik Lake Airport (IATA: KCQ, FAA LID: A79)
- List of airports in Alaska
