= King Salmon Airport =

Airport in Alaska, United States

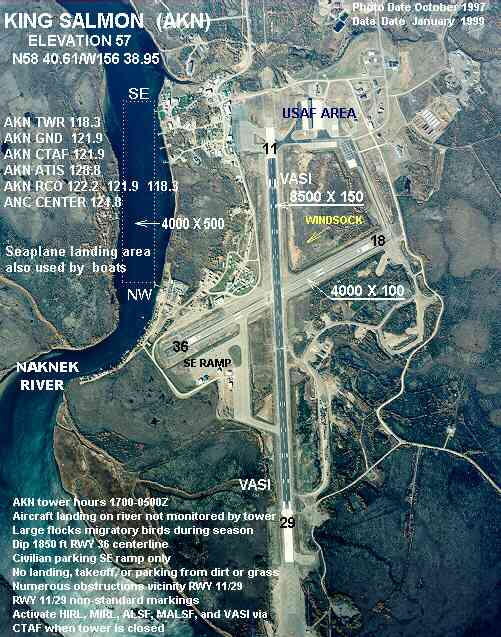
- IATA: AKN; ICAO: PAKN; FAA LID: AKN

Summary
- Airport type: Public
- Owner: State of Alaska DOT&PF - Central Region
- Serves: King Salmon, Alaska
- Elevation AMSL: 73 ft (22 m)
- Coordinates: 58°40′35″N 156°38′55″W

Map
- Location of airport in Alaska

Runways
Direction	Length		Surface
Direction	ft	m	Surface
12/30	8,901	2,713	Asphalt
18/36	4,017	1,224	Asphalt

Statistics (12 months ending May 2022 ^{except where noted})
- Passenger volume: 54,020
- Departing passengers: 26,000
- Scheduled flights: 4,232
- Cargo (lb.): 14 mil
- Aircraft operations (2021): 25,201
- Based aircraft (2022): 39
- Source: Federal Aviation Administration, BTS

King Salmon Airport (IATA: AKN, ICAO: PAKN, FAA LID: AKN) is a state-owned public-use airport located just southeast of King Salmon, in the Bristol Bay Borough of the U.S. state of Alaska. It was formerly the Naknek Air Force Base, named for its location near the Naknek River.

As per Federal Aviation Administration records, the airport had 42,310 passenger boardings ( enplanements ) in calendar year 2008, 40,637 enplanements in 2009, and 41,514 in 2010. It is included in the Federal Aviation Administration (FAA) National Plan of Integrated Airport Systems for 2021–2025, in which it is categorized as a non-hub primary commercial service facility.

== Facilities and aircraft ==
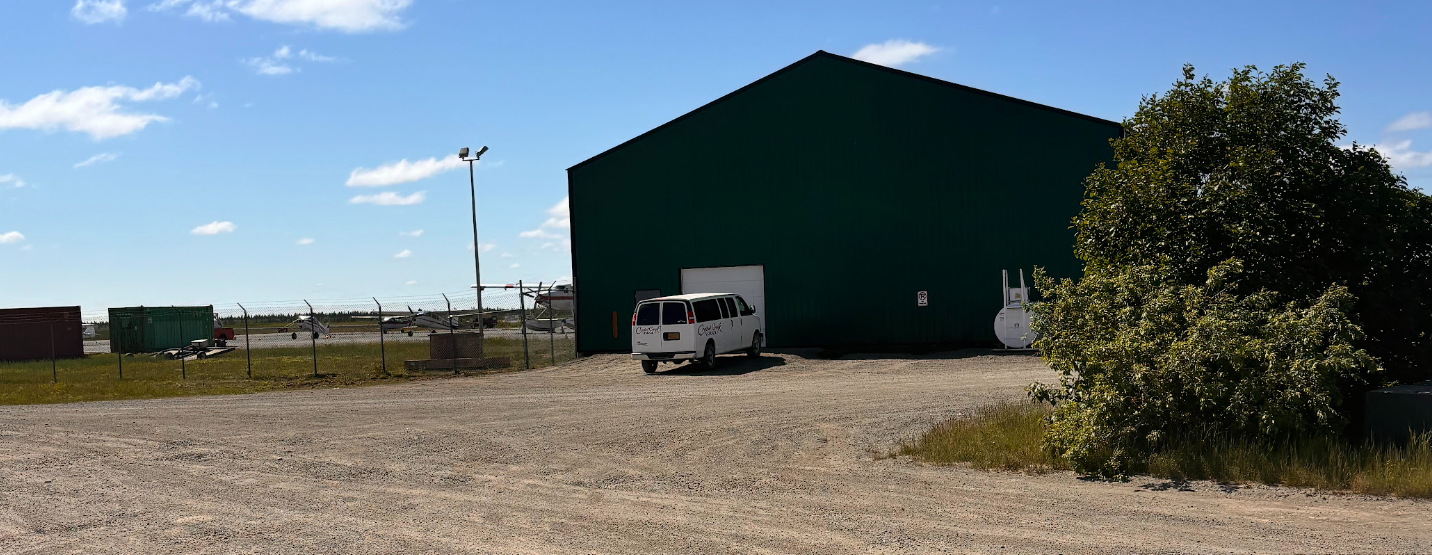
Facilities on the ground, off runway 36

King Salmon Airport covers an area of 1,570 acres (635 ha) at an elevation of 73 feet (22 m) above mean sea level. It has two asphalt paved runways: 12/30 measuring 8,901 by 150 feet (2,713 × 46 m) and 18/36 measuring 4,017 by 100 feet (1,224 × 30 m).

For the 12-month period ending June 30, 2021 the airport had 25,201 aircraft operations, an average of 69 per day: 65% air taxi, 24% general aviation, 7% scheduled commercial, and 4% military. In August 2022, there were 39 aircraft based at this airport: 33 single-engine, 3 multi-engine, and 3 helicopter.

== Airlines and destinations ==
=== Passenger ===
Airlines	Destinations
Alaska Airlines	Anchorage
Aleutian Airways	Anchorage
Grant Aviation	Chignik, Chignik Lagoon, Chignik Lake, Clarks Point, Dillingham, Egegik, Igiugig, Levelock, Perryville, Pilot Point, Port Heiden, South Naknek, Ugashik Bay
Katmai Air	Anchorage, Brooks Camp

== Statistics ==
=== Statistics ===
Top airlines at AKN (July 2024 – June 2025)
Rank	Airline	Passengers	Percent of market share
1	Alaska Airlines	22,770	32.62%
2	Horizon Air (Alaska Airlines)	19,980	28.62%
3	Katmai Air	12,770	18.29%
4	Aleutian Airways	9,080	13.01%
5	Grant Aviation	5,200	7.45%

=== Top destinations ===
Busiest domestic routes from AKN (July 2024 – June 2025)
Rank	City	Airport	Passengers	Carriers
1	Anchorage, AK	Ted Stevens Anchorage International Airport	25,840	Alaska, Aleutian, Katmai
2	Brooks Camp, AK		6,300	Katmai
3	Dillingham, AK	Dillingham Airport	1,040	Grant
4	Egegik, AK	Egegik Airport	410	Grant
5	Port Heiden, AK	Port Heiden Airport	300	Grant
6	Perryville, AK	Perryville Airport	180	Grant
7	Pilot Point, AK	Pilot Point Airport	160	Grant
8	Levelock, AK	Levelock Airport	140	Grant
9	Chignik Lake, AK	Chignik Lake Airport	110	Grant
10	Chignik Lagoon, AK	Chignik Lagoon Airport	70	Grant

== Accidents and incidents ==
On June 30, 1985, Douglas C-47B N168Z of Northern Peninsula Fisheries was substantially damaged at King Salmon when both engines failed on approach while the aircraft was on an executive flight from Homer Airport, Alaska. The cause of the accident was fuel exhaustion. A fuel filler cap was discovered to be missing after the accident.

== See also ==
- List of airports in Alaska
