= Port Heiden Airport =

Airport in Alaska, United States of America

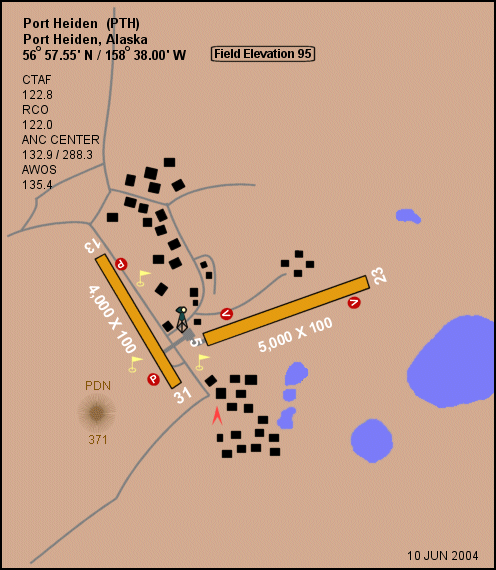
- IATA: PTH; ICAO: PAPH; FAA LID: PTH

Summary
- Airport type: Public
- Owner: State of Alaska DOT&PF - Central Region
- Serves: Port Heiden, Alaska
- Elevation AMSL: 95 ft (29 m)
- Coordinates: 56°57′33″N 158°38′00″W

Map
- Location of airport in Alaska

Runways
Direction	Length		Surface
Direction	ft	m	Surface
5/23	5,000	1,524	Gravel
13/31	4,000	1,219	Gravel

Statistics (2005)
- Aircraft operations: 1,000
- Source: Federal Aviation Administration

Port Heiden Airport (IATA: PTH, ICAO: PAPH, FAA LID: PTH) is a state-owned public airport located six nautical miles (7 mi, 11 km) northeast of the central business district of Port Heiden, in the Lake and Peninsula Borough of the U.S. state of Alaska. The scheduled airline services to King Salmon Airport are provided by Peninsula Airways (PenAir).

As per Federal Aviation Administration records, the airport had 919 passenger boardings (enplanements) in calendar year 2008, 964 enplanements in 2009, and 1,037 in 2010. It is included in the National Plan of Integrated Airport Systems for 2011–2015, which categorized it as a general aviation facility (the commercial service category requires at least 2,500 enplanements per year).

== History ==
Originally opened as Fort Morrow Army Airfield, the facility was closed after World War II and returned to its civilian status. Beginning in 1958, the airport was used to support Port Heiden Air Force Station—a Cold War United States Air Force Distant Early Warning Line radar station. The station was operated by Detachment 5, 714th Aircraft Control and Warning Squadron based at Cold Bay Air Force Station, near Cold Bay. The radar station was inactivated in September 1969, ending the military use of the airport.

The Air Force remediated the radar site around year 2000, removing all abandoned military structures and returning the site to its natural condition.

== Facilities and aircraft ==
Port Heiden Airport covers an area of 3,500 acres (1,416 ha) at an elevation of 95 feet (29 m) above mean sea level. It has two runways with gravel surfaces: 5/23 is 5,000 by 100 feet (1,524 x 30 m) and 13/31 is 4,000 by 100 feet (1,219 x 30 m).

For the 12-month period ending December 31, 2005, the airport had 1,000 aircraft operations, an average of 83 per month: 50% air taxi and 50% general aviation.

== Airlines and destinations ==
Airlines	Destinations
Grant Aviation	Chignik, Chignik Lagoon, Chignik Lake, King Salmon, Manokotak, Perryville

== Incidents ==
- On April 30, 2008, a Cessna Citation Excel business jet veered off the gravel runway 23 upon landing in a crosswind. The plane sustained a substantial damage, though there were no injuries recorded among the six occupants.

== See also ==
- List of airports in Alaska
