= Alaska Peninsula =

Peninsula extending towards the Aleutian Islands in Southwest Alaska, United States

Coordinates: 56.5°N 158.75°W

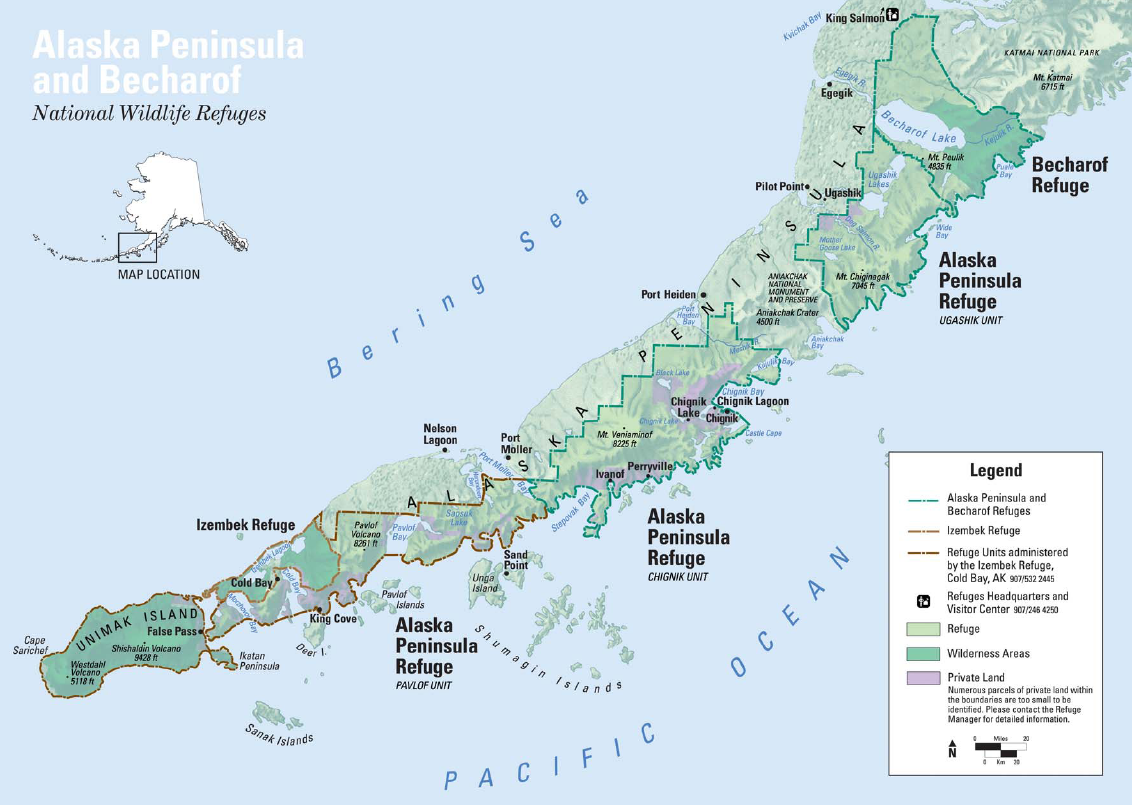
Map of the Alaska Peninsula

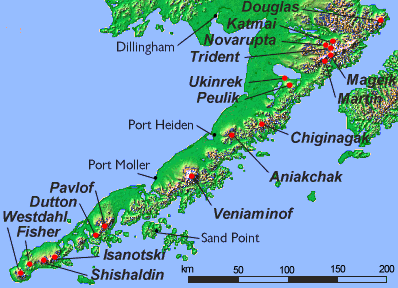
Volcanoes on the Alaska Peninsula

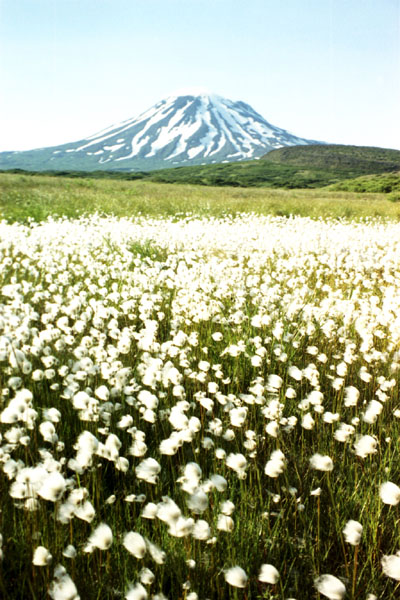
Peulik Volcano and cottongrass meadow

The Alaska Peninsula (also called the Aleut Peninsula or the Aleutian Peninsula, Aleut: Alaxsxix̂; Sugpiaq: Aluuwiq, Al'uwiq) extends about 497 mi (800 km) to the southwest from the mainland of Alaska and ending in the Aleutian Islands. The peninsula separates the Pacific Ocean from Bristol Bay, an arm of the Bering Sea.

In literature (especially Russian), the term Alaska Peninsula was used to denote the entire north-western protrusion of the North American continent, or all of what is now the state of Alaska, exclusive of its panhandle and islands. The Lake and Peninsula borough, the Alaskan equivalent of a county, is named after the peninsula.

The Alaska/Aleutian Peninsula is also grouped into Southwest Alaska.

The other large peninsulas in Alaska include the Kenai Peninsula and the Seward Peninsula.

== Geography ==
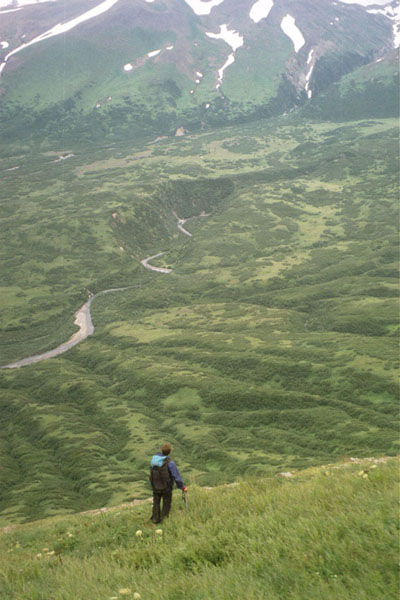
Springtime hiker near Chiginagak Volcano in May 2007

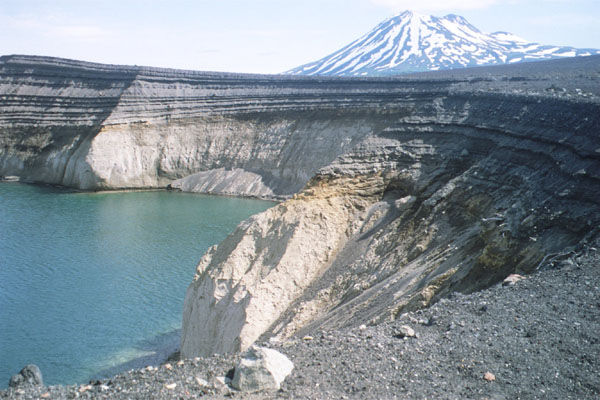
Peulik Volcano and Ukinrek Maars

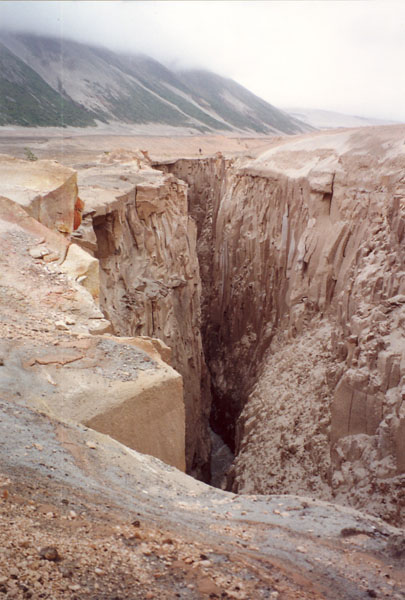
Gorge in Valley of Ten Thousand Smokes

The base of the Alaska Peninsula extends outward from the end of the Alaska Range.

The Aleutian Range is a very active volcanic mountain range which runs along the entire length of the peninsula. Within it lie Wildlife Refuges, including the Katmai National Park and Preserve, the Aniakchak National Monument and Preserve and the Becharof National Wildlife Refuge, the Alaska Peninsula National Wildlife Refuge, and the Izembek National Wildlife Refuge. The most active volcano along the volcanic mountain range is Pavlof Volcano which is more than 8,251 feet (2,515 meters)(see also: Aleutian Arc).

The southern side of the Alaska Peninsula is rugged and mountainous, created by the uplifting tectonic activity of the North Pacific Plate subsiding under a western section of the North American Plate; the northern side is generally flat and marshy, a result of millennia of erosion and general seismic stability. The northern and southern shores are likewise quite different. The northern Bristol Bay coastal side is generally turbid and muddy, experiences tidal extremes, and is relatively shallow; the Pacific side, which is also known as the "ring of fire", has relatively small tidal activity and the water is deep and clear.

== Administration ==
The peninsula is organized as a part of four adjacent boroughs; the Aleutians East Borough, Bristol Bay Borough, Kodiak Island Borough, and Lake and Peninsula Borough. The Lake and Peninsula Borough includes most of the peninsula's territory.

== Climate ==
Average annual precipitation ranges from 24–65 in (610–1,650 mm). Coastal areas are subject to intense storms, wind, and rain. Winter temperatures average between 12 and 34 °F (−11 and 1 °C), and in summer between 43 and 59 °F (6 and 15 °C). Frosts can occur any day of the year at higher elevations. The climate can be compared to that of parts of Scotland, the Aleutian Islands, Iceland, and Tierra del Fuego.

Port Heiden, Alaska

Climate chart (precipitation, max. and min. temperature)
J	F	M	A	M	J	J	A	S	O	N	D
0.9 29 16	0.5 28 16	0.9 33 20	0.8 38 26	0.8 47 35	1.1 53 41	1.6 57 46	2 58 48	2.1 54 43	2.2 43 32	1.4 36 25	1 30 19
- █ Average max. and min. temperatures in °F
- █ Precipitation totals in inches
Metric conversion
J	F	M	A	M	J	J	A	S	O	N	D
22 −2 −9	13 −2 −9	23 0 −7	19 3 −3	21 8 2	28 12 5	41 14 8	50 15 9	52 12 6	56 6 0	36 2 −4	26 −1 −8
- █ Average max. and min. temperatures in °C
- █ Precipitation totals in mm

Chignik, Alaska

Climate chart (precipitation, max. and min. temperature)
J	F	M	A	M	J	J	A	S	O	N	D
5.9 31 20	7.6 33 21	6.9 35 23	4.9 40 28	6.7 46 35	6 55 41	4.3 61 46	5.1 61 47	9.7 55 41	8.8 45 34	10 38 28	7.2 34 24
- █ Average max. and min. temperatures in °F
- █ Precipitation totals in inches
Metric conversion
J	F	M	A	M	J	J	A	S	O	N	D
149 0 −7	193 0 −6	175 2 −5	124 4 −2	171 8 2	153 13 5	109 16 8	129 16 8	247 13 5	224 7 1	256 4 −2	183 1 −5
- █ Average max. and min. temperatures in °C
- █ Precipitation totals in mm

== Flora and fauna ==
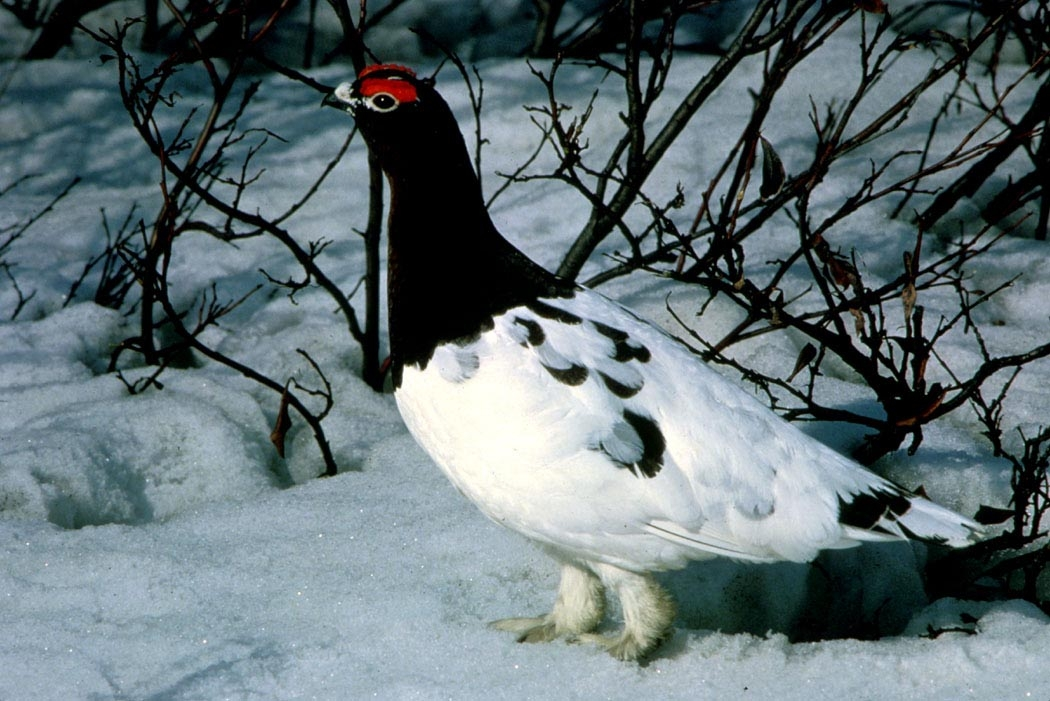
Willow ptarmigan

The Alaska Peninsula is home to some of the largest populations of native and undisturbed wildlife in the United States. Besides the famous McNeil River and Katmai Alaskan brown bear populations, large herds of caribou, moose, wolves, waterfowl, and willow ptarmigan inhabit the area. The bears of the peninsula and Bristol Bay are so numerous because they feed on the world's largest sockeye salmon (Oncorhynchus nerka) runs, which occur here in large part because the many large lakes of the peninsula are an important element in their lifecycle. These salmon, after returning from their brief time at sea, swim into the lakes and their contributing streams to spawn. Their offspring, or fry, overwinter in the deep and food-abundant depths of these lakes until their migration to the sea in one or two years.

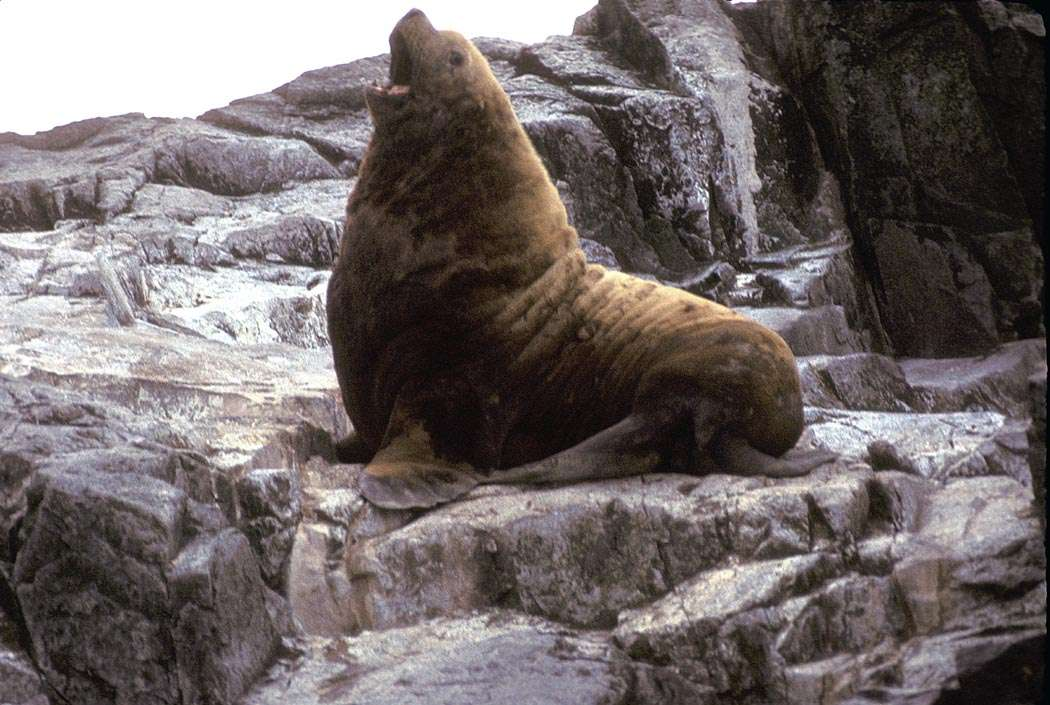
Northern fur seals

Exceptionally large seabird colonies exist along the coast. Additionally, there are large populations of sea mammals in the North Pacific Ocean between the Alaska Peninsula and Kamchatka. This includes harbor seals, ringed seals, northern fur seals, whales, porpoises, sea otters and sea lions.

The rugged southern half of the peninsula, and also the Kodiak Archipelago which lie off the south coast of the peninsula and are home to even more bears, constitute the Alaska Peninsula montane taiga ecoregion and contain a number of protected areas such as Katmai National Park. Vegetation on the peninsula consists mostly of shrub-lands, grassy meadows, or wet tundra.

== Demographics ==
Besides the communities on the coast (see: Bristol Bay), the Alaska Peninsula also is home to several well-known villages: Cold Bay, King Cove, Perryville, Chignik, Chignik Lake, Chignik Lagoon, and Port Moller. Each is primarily inhabited by Alaska Natives and each, likewise, is mostly dependent on the fishing industry for sustenance.

== See also ==
- List of peninsulas
