= Perryville Airport =

Airport in Alaska, United States

- IATA: KPV; ICAO: PAPE; FAA LID: PEV

Summary
- Airport type: Public
- Owner: Alaska DOT&PF - Central Region
- Serves: Perryville, Alaska
- Elevation AMSL: 29 ft (8.8 m)
- Coordinates: 55°54′24″N 159°09′39″W

Map
- Location of airport in Alaska

Runways
Direction	Length		Surface
Direction	ft	m	Surface
2/20	3,300	1,006	Gravel

Statistics (2005)
- Aircraft operations: 410
- Enplanements (2008): 714
- Source: Federal Aviation Administration

Perryville Airport (IATA: KPV, ICAO: PAPE, FAA LID: PEV, formerly AK5) is a state-owned, public-use airport located one nautical mile (1.85 km) southwest of the central business district of Perryville, in the Lake and Peninsula Borough of the U.S. state of Alaska. Scheduled airline service to King Salmon Airport is provided by Peninsula Airways (PenAir).

As per Federal Aviation Administration records, this airport had 714 commercial passenger boardings (enplanements) in calendar year 2008, an increase of 5% from the 683 enplanements in 2007. Perryville Airport is included in the FAA's National Plan of Integrated Airport Systems (2009–2013), which categorizes it as a general aviation facility.

Although most U.S. airports use the same three-letter location identifier for the FAA and IATA, this airport is assigned PEV by the FAA and KPV by the IATA.

== Facilities and aircraft ==
Perryville Airport covers an area of 149 acres (60 ha) at an elevation of 29 feet (9 m) above mean sea level. It has one runway designated 2/20 with a gravel surface measuring 3,300 by 75 feet (1,006 x 23 m). The airport is unattended.

The airport's former runway was designated 3/21 and measured 2,467 by 50 feet (752 m × 15 m).

For the 12-month period ending December 31, 2005, the airport had 410 aircraft operations, an average of 34 per month: 51% air taxi and 49% general aviation.

== Airlines and destinations ==
Airlines	Destinations
Grant Aviation	Chignik, Chignik Lagoon, Chignik Lake, King Salmon, Port Heiden

== See also ==
- List of airports in Alaska
