= PenAir =

Regional airline in Alaska, 1955–2020

Peninsula Airways (PenAir)
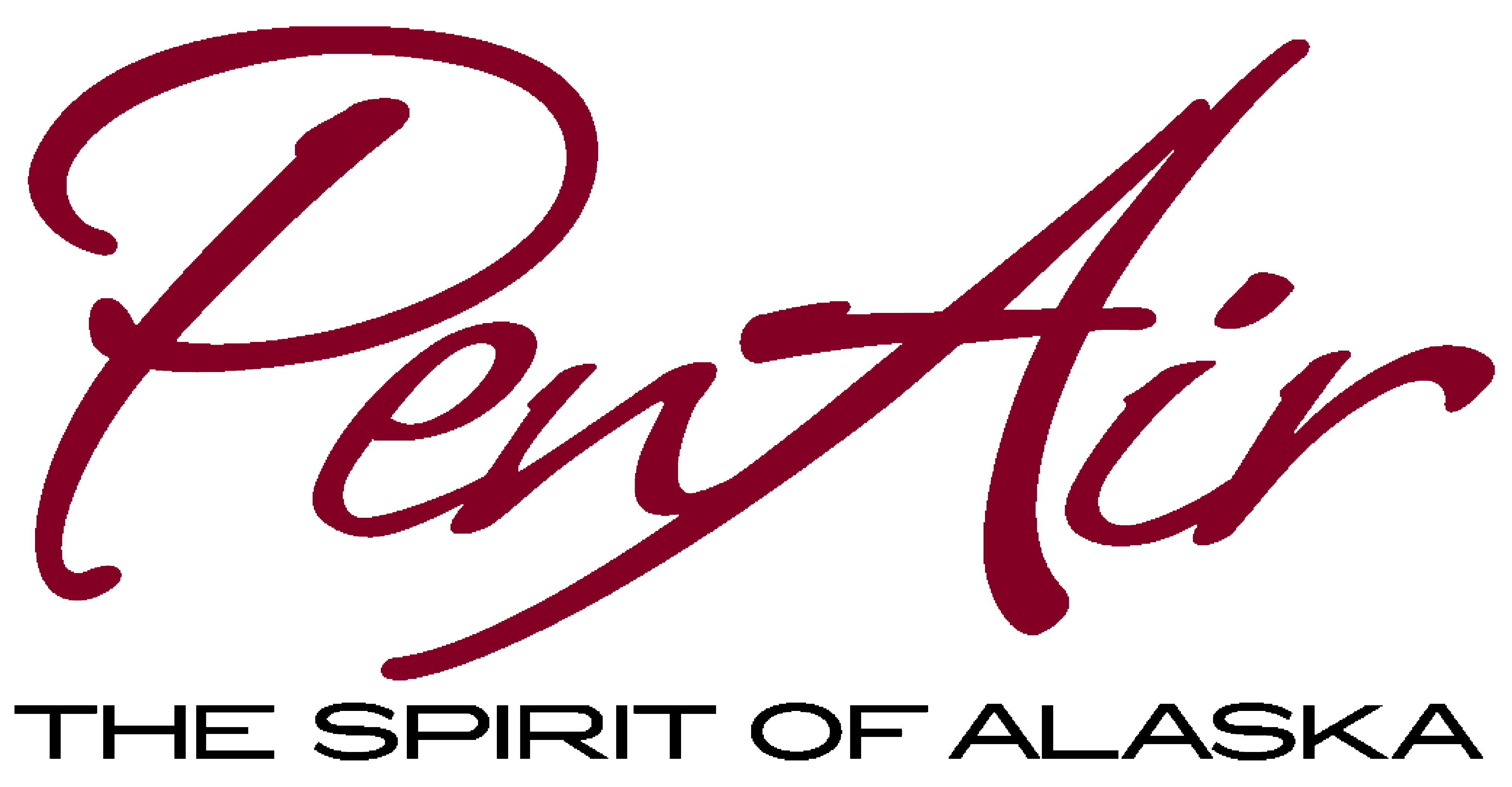
IATA	ICAO	Call sign
7H	NLA	PENINSULA
- Founded: 1955; 71 years ago
- Ceased operations: April 5, 2020; 6 years ago (bankruptcy of RavnAir Group)
- AOC #: PNSA044A
- Hubs: Ted Stevens Anchorage International Airport
- Frequent-flyer program: Mileage Plan FlyAway Rewards
- Fleet size: 6 (5 operative aircraft)
- Destinations: 8
- Headquarters: Anchorage, Alaska, U.S.
- Website: www.ravnalaska.com

Peninsula Airways, operated as PenAir, was a U.S.-based regional airline headquartered in Anchorage, Alaska. It was Alaska's second-largest commuter airline operating scheduled passenger service, as well as charter and medevac services throughout the state. Its main base was Ted Stevens Anchorage International Airport. PenAir had a code sharing agreement in place with Alaska Airlines with its flights operated in the state of Alaska.

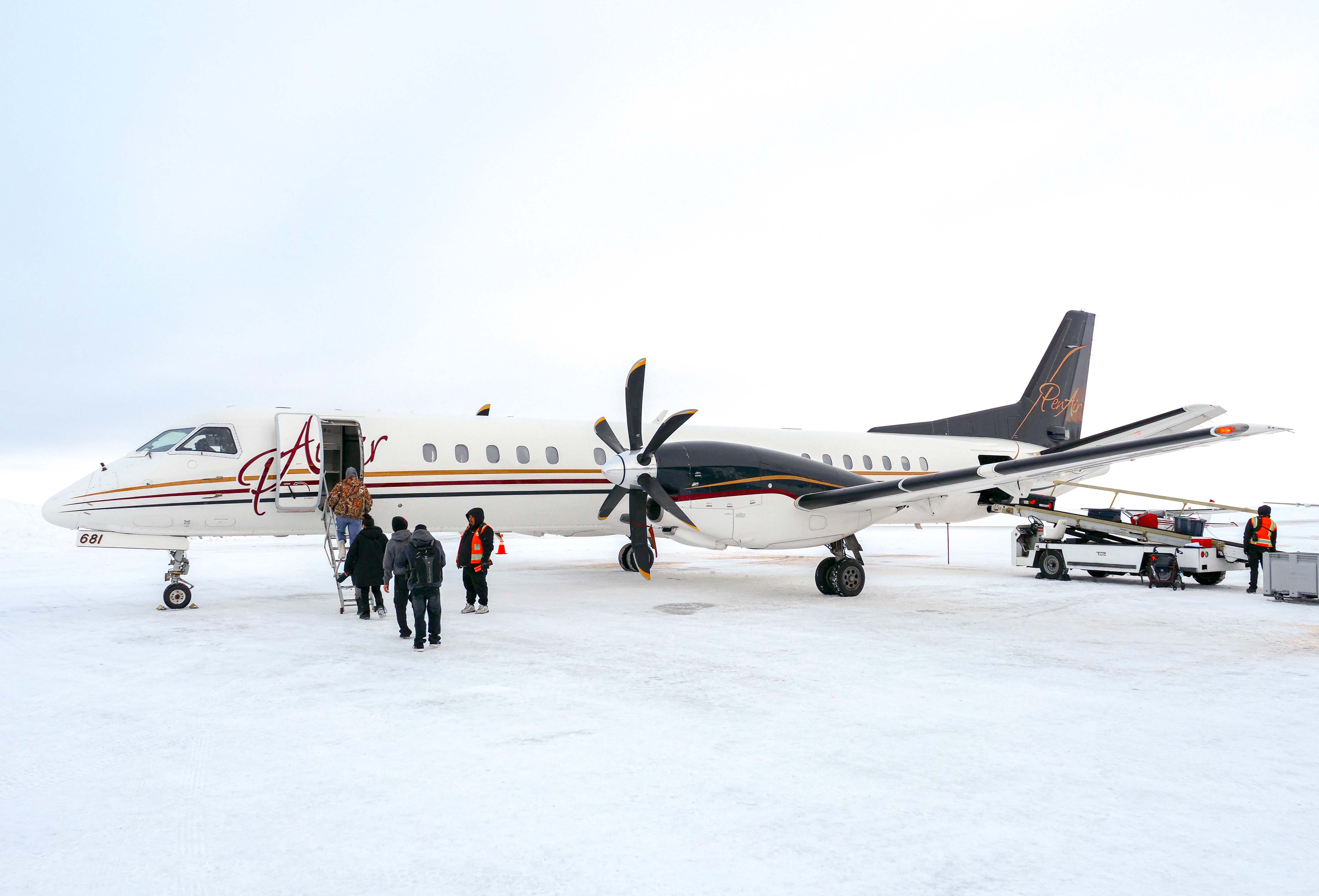
A PenAir Saab 2000 boarding passengers in Bethel, AK

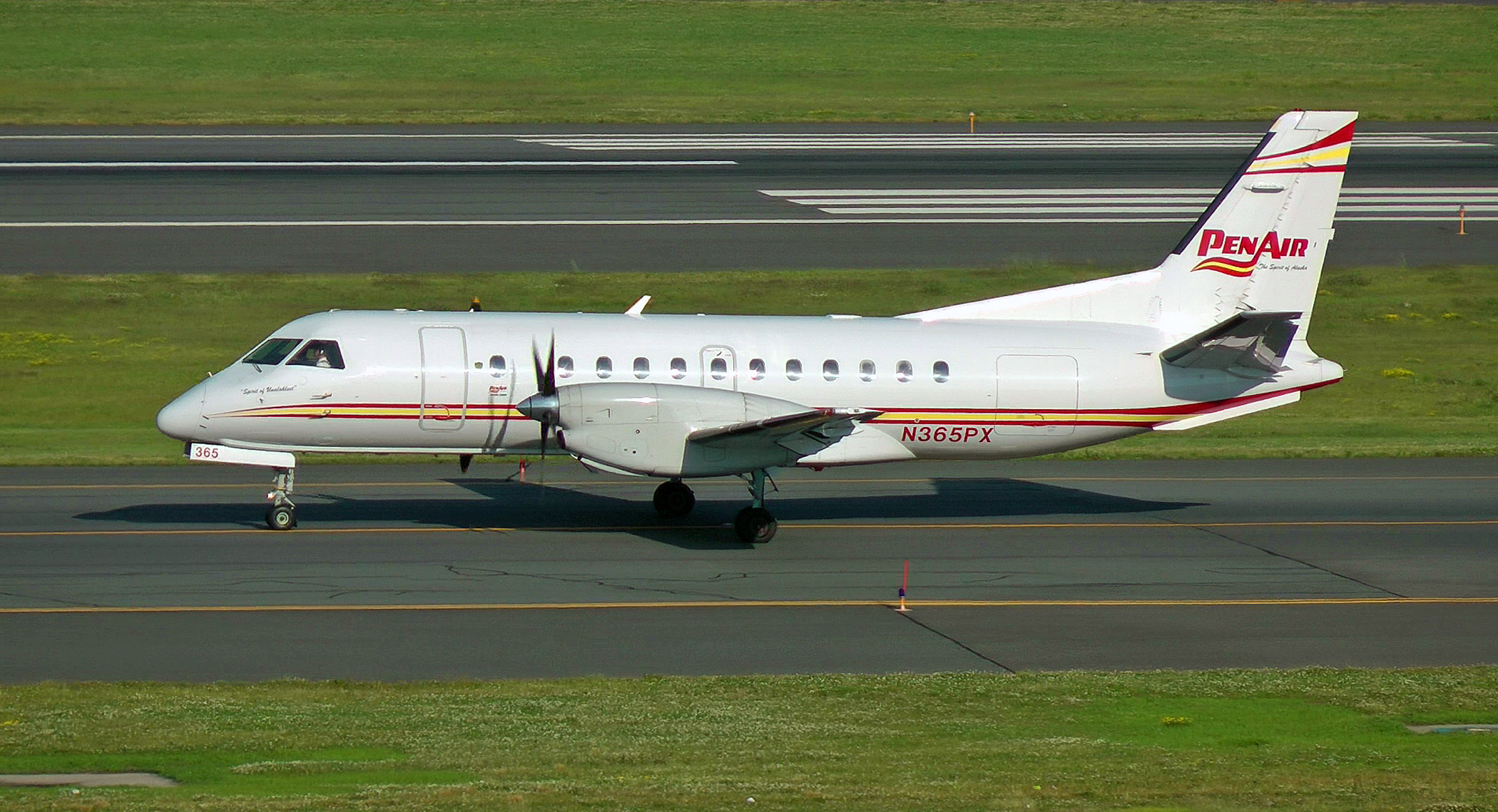
PenAir Saab 340B

== History ==
Peninsula Airways was founded by Orin Seybert in 1955. Seybert was 19 years old, living in Pilot Point, Alaska, and owned a 1946 two-seat Taylorcraft. In 1956, a four-seat Piper Tri-Pacer was added. On March 1, 1965, Peninsula Airways became incorporated and purchased the fixed base operation (FBO) in King Salmon.

In 1967, Peninsula Airways became a full-time subcontractor to Reeve Aleutian Airways, meeting Reeve's certificate obligations to Chignik, Perryville and Ivanoff Bay.

In 1969, Peninsula Airways acquired all assets of Tibbetts-Herre Airmotive, which had operated from Naknek since 1950. By 1973, regular service was provided between King Salmon and the Pribilof Island communities, St. Paul and St. George. Charter service was also extended into the Aleutian Islands, Dutch Harbor, Atka and Adak with Grumman G-44 Widgeon amphibious aircraft.

In 1977, two Grumman Goose amphibious aircraft were purchased from Reeve Aleutian Airways, and the sub-contract was expanded to cover all locations certificated to Reeve throughout the Alaskan Peninsula and Aleutian Islands. This required setting up an operating base at Cold Bay, with hangars, offices and employee housing.

In 1980, the Civil Aeronautics Board awarded a Part 401 Certificate of Public Convenience and Necessity to Peninsula Airways, and all aircraft operations were conducted under Part 135 of the Federal Air Regulations.

In 1983, Peninsula Airways acquired its first turboprop: a Cessna Conquest operated out of Cold Bay. Peninsula Airways was the first Alaskan air carrier to qualify for CAB Part 419 subsidy, allowing the airline to operate Essential Air Service (EAS) routes to Atka, St. George and Kodiak Island.

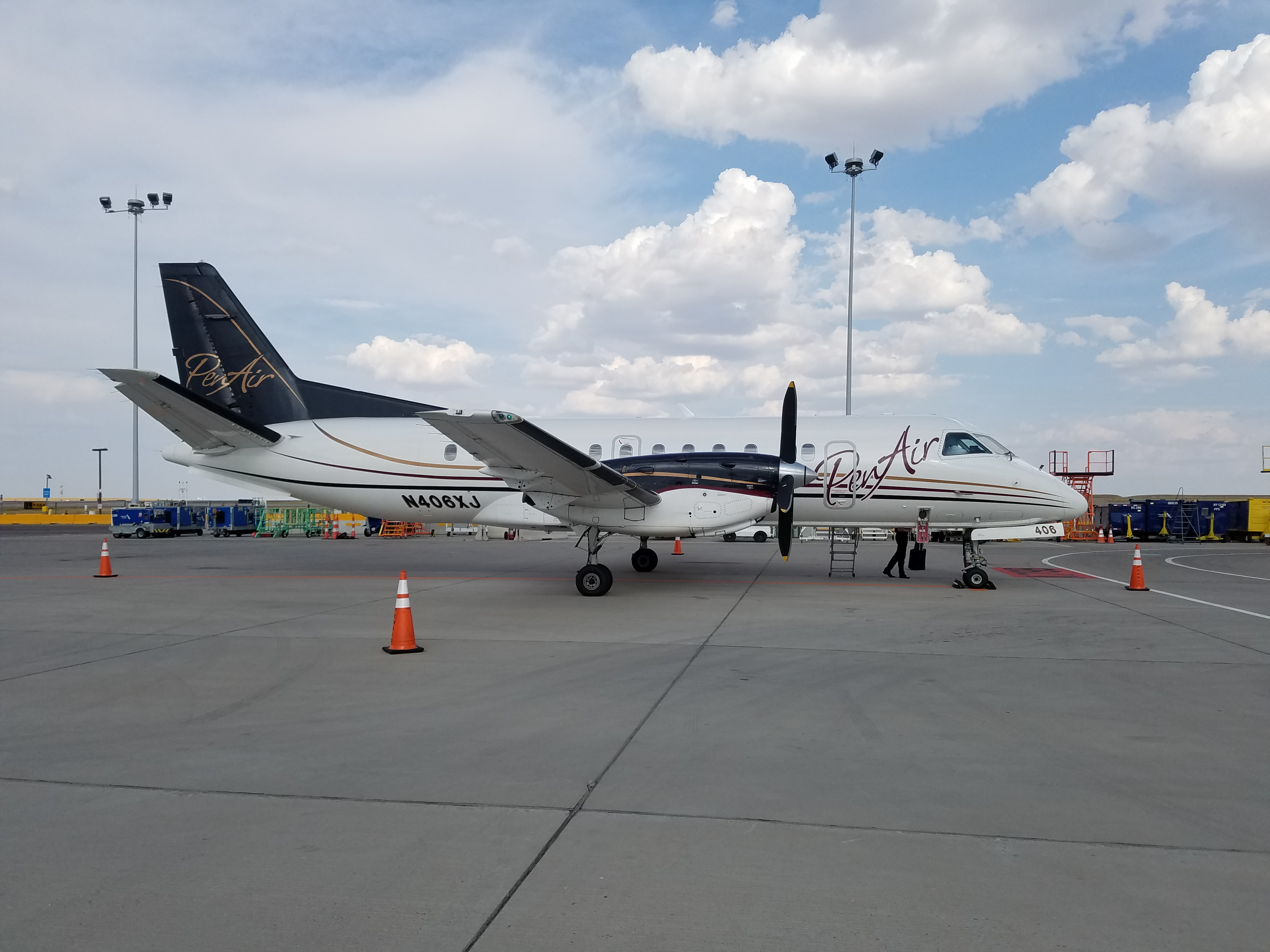
PenAir Saab 340B (N406XJ) in latest livery at Denver International Airport

In 1985, Peninsula Airways acquired all assets of Air Transport Services, Inc., based in Kodiak. Included in the deal was a hangar and office facility with approximately six aircraft and scheduled year-round service to all points on the Island. A base was established in Anchorage with two Cessna Conquest turboprops offering charter service from Anchorage to the Pribilof Islands. Scheduled service from Anchorage to King Salmon and Dillingham was added a year later.

The first Fairchild Swearingen Metroliner propjet was placed into service in 1987 and Metro aircraft remained in the fleet until 2011.

In 1988, several bush operators in Dillingham had their certificates revoked by the Federal Aviation Administration (FAA), prompting Peninsula Airways to set up an operation there. A hangar and aircraft were purchased and service to the surrounding communities began.

In 1989, Peninsula Airways was contracted by Exxon to support the Exxon Valdez oil spill cleanup. At the same time, a contract was awarded to Peninsula Airways by Alaska Regional Hospital to provide 24-hour medevac service. Peninsula Airways' operations were inspected and approved by Exxon Corporation, U.S. Department of the Interior Office of Aviation Services (OAS), U.S. Department of Defense, and two (FAA) NASIP "white glove" inspections.

In 1991, Peninsula Airways began doing business as PenAir and became a code sharing and Mileage Plan partner with Alaska Airlines. PenAir transitioned to FAA Part 121 regulations in 1996, operating under both Part 135 and 121. PenAir was the first regional airline in the United States to make the 10-19 seat required conversion, including a dispatch department.

In 1997, PenAir acquired two Saab 340B aircraft and, in 1998, moved its headquarters into a new hangar/office complex in Anchorage, Alaska.

In 2007 the airline revealed its plan, for a 25-year plan for Unalaska's airport planned by Alaska Department of Transportation, to consider the introduction of Bombardier Q400 by year 2016 to replace the Saab 340B for Unalaska, and it had even looked into using Saab 2000 but this aircraft type isn't used anywhere else in the United States at that moment meaning that the airline would have had to undertake the costly process of getting the aircraft certified with the FAA; while in 2015 PenAir's president mentioned the leasing of Saab 2000 for the Unalaska-to-Anchorage route, and adding that larger planes like the Bombardier Q400 wouldn't have been economical on the route.

Meanwhile, the airline expanded its operations outside of Alaska in 2012 after bidding on and being awarded Essential Air Service routes in the Northeastern United States. It established a hub at Boston's Logan International Airport and started operating service to Presque Isle, Maine and Plattsburgh, New York, with additional seasonal service to Bar Harbor, Maine.

PenAir's presence in the continental United States greatly expanded in 2016 when the airline was awarded multiple Essential Air Service routes in the Midwestern and Western United States. The airline established its third and fourth hubs at Denver International Airport and Portland International Airport. From Denver, PenAir operated service to Dodge City and Liberal, Kansas and Kearney, North Platte, and Scottsbluff, Nebraska. From Portland, PenAir operated Essential Air Service to Crescent City, California and also began service to Arcata/Eureka and Redding, California and Klamath Falls and North Bend/Coos Bay, Oregon.

On August 7, 2017, PenAir filed for Chapter 11 bankruptcy. PenAir made the decision to end all flights out of its Denver and Portland hubs. Routes in California and Oregon that were not funded by Essential Air Service subsidies were terminated within days. The terms of the Essential Air Service contract required that PenAir continue to operate those routes until a new airline could be awarded the contract, a process expected to be completed within 90 days. On August 30, 2017, PenAir announced it would cease all Denver operations effective after September 10, 2017 due to a mass resignation involving 17 crew members.

On November 30, 2017, PenAir announced it would end its service to Crescent City, California as of December 15. The city has chosen Contour Airlines to operate the Essential Air Service route, but PenAir stated it would be unable to continue the service until Contour begins operating.

On May 30, 2018, PenAir cancelled service via Boston to and from Plattsburgh, Bar Harbor and Presque Isle a month early, citing staffing issues, breaking their Essential Air Services contract with the Department of Transportation.

On June 1, 2019, PenAir ceased direct ticket sales under its own brand. From that day, all PenAir flights are marketed and sold using Ravn Alaska (7H) flight numbers.

== Fleet ==
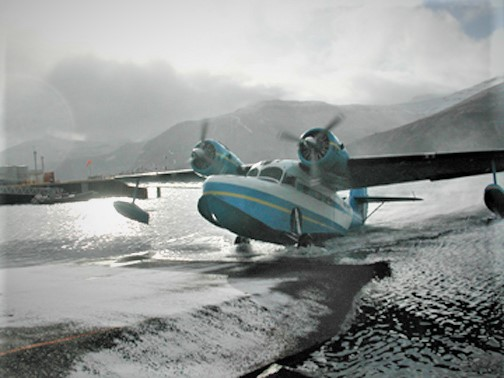
PenAir Grumman Goose

As of March 2019 the PenAir fleet consisted of the following aircraft:

PenAir fleet
Aircraft	In service	Seats
Saab 2000	5	45

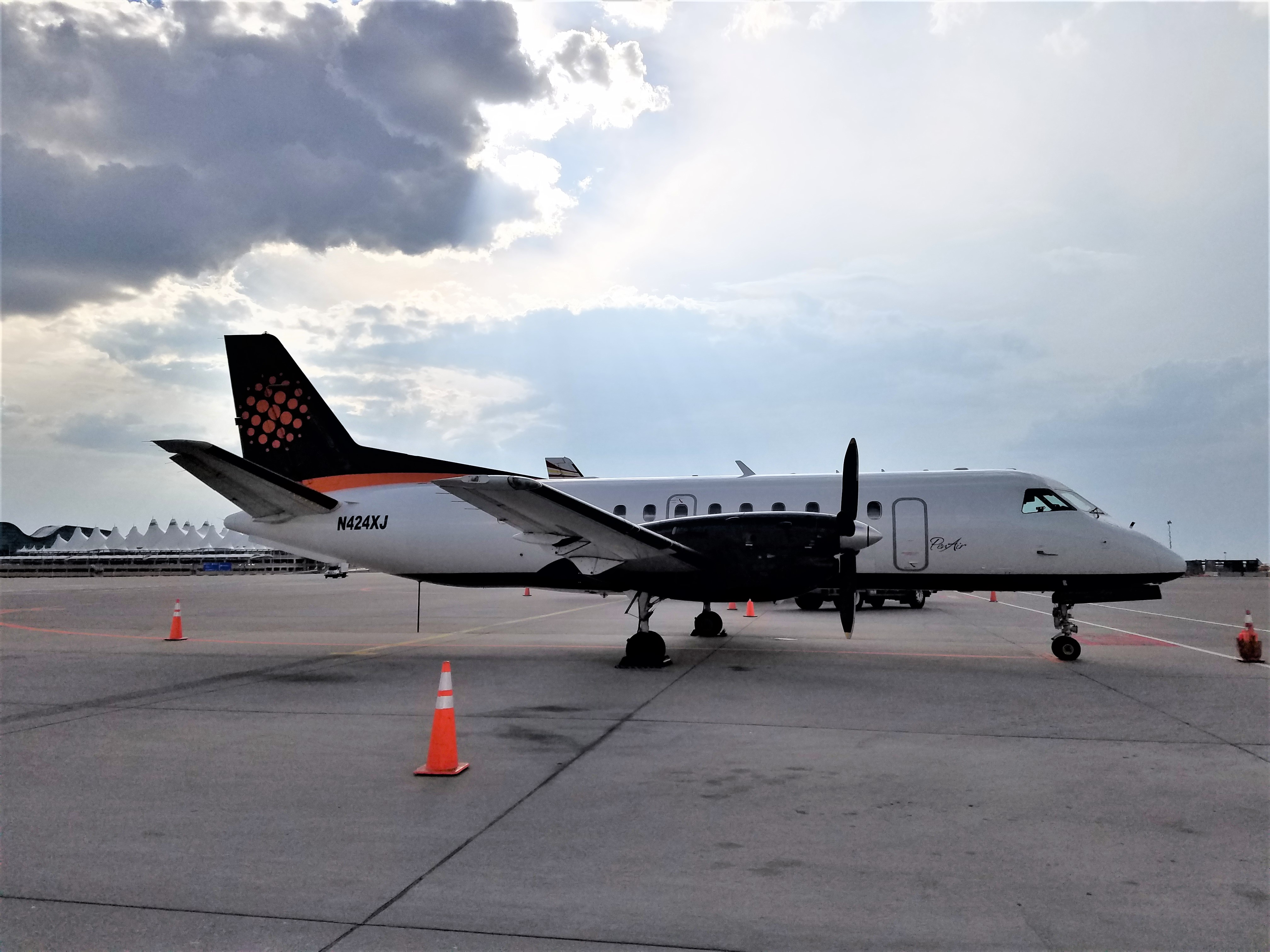
PenAir Saab 340B N424XJ. Note the SOL Lineas Aereas livery

PenAir was the only air carrier in the U.S. operating the Saab 2000 regional turboprop in scheduled passenger airline service.

PenAir was among the last airlines in the world to operate the Grumman G-21A Goose seaplane on scheduled flights. This piston-powered amphibious aircraft was used to resupply remote coastal locations where no land-based airstrip existed. On December 21, 2012, the Grumman Goose made its final commercial flight from Unalaska to Anchorage. PenAir also previously operated another piston-powered amphibious aircraft type being the Grumman G-44 Widgeon.

The airline also previously operated several turboprop-powered aircraft types including the Cessna 208B Grand Caravan, Cessna 441 Conquest, as well as the Metro II, Metro III and Metro 23 variants of the Fairchild Swearingen Metroliner.

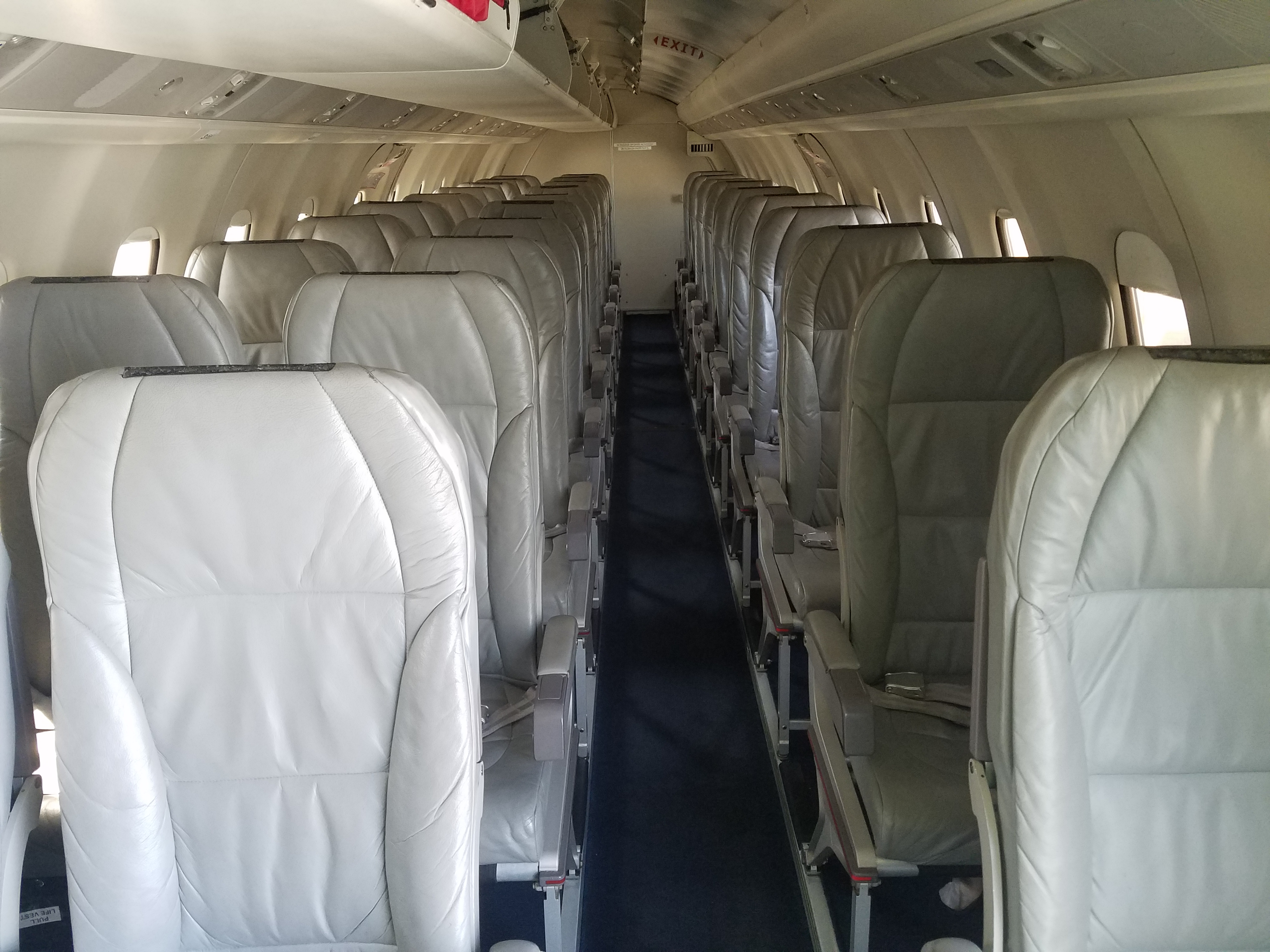
PenAir Saab 340B 1-2 Seating N406XJ

Previously operated piston-powered landplane aircraft included the Piper Navajo Chieftain and Piper Saratoga.

According to the July 1, 2016 Alaska Airlines system timetable, PenAir was then operating all of its code sharing flights in the state of Alaska on behalf of Alaska Airlines with Saab 340B and Saab 2000 turboprop aircraft. The Saab 2000 is a larger, high-speed version of the Saab 340B. All Alaska Airlines code sharing flights in the lower 48 states in the U.S. were operated by PenAir with the Saab 340B.

== Destinations ==
=== Former destinations ===
Before PenAir ceased operations in 2020, it operated scheduled service from Ted Stevens Anchorage International Airport to the following destinations in Alaska:

1. Anchorage (ANC) – Ted Stevens Anchorage International Airport (to Cold Bay, Dillingham, Dutch Harbor, King Salmon, Kodiak, Fairbanks, and Sand Point)
2. Cold Bay (CDB) – Cold Bay Airport (to Anchorage)
3. Dillingham (DLG) – Dillingham Airport (to Anchorage)
4. Dutch Harbor / Unalaska (DUT) – Unalaska Airport (to Anchorage) (marketed and sold by Alaska Airlines)
5. King Salmon (AKN) – King Salmon Airport (to Anchorage)
6. Kodiak (ADQ) – Kodiak Airport (to Anchorage)
7. Fairbanks (FAI) – Fairbanks International Airport (to Anchorage)
8. Sand Point (SDP) – Sand Point Airport (to Anchorage)

All flights in the state of Alaska were operated as code sharing service with Ravn Alaska, with the exception of service to Dutch Harbor / Unalaska which was operated under a capacity purchase agreement, where flights were marketed and sold by Alaska Airlines and operated by PenAir.

PenAir operations in 2020 after its parent company, RavnAir Group, suspended operations and filed for bankruptcy.

=== Community awareness ===
PenAir, along with Bering Air, Frontier Flying Service, Grant Aviation, Northern Air Cargo, and Ryan Air Services all participate in the Flying Can service, which allows rural Alaskan communities to recycle aluminum cans and number 1 PET bottles in cooperation with Alaskans for Litter Prevention and Recycling.

== Accidents and incidents ==
- On December 15, 1968, a Grumman G-44 Widgeon registered N148M struck the shore and crashed while taking off from Sanak Island, Alaska, injuring all four people on board.
- On January 23, 1981, a Grumman G-21A Goose registered N95468 crashed into the sea off Dutch Harbour, killing the two occupants.
- On February 14, 1985, a Piper PA-31-310 Navajo registered N63719 crashed into the side of a mountain in Port Heiden, Alaska. The pilot, the only occupant of the plane, was killed.
- On February 17, 1990, a Piper PA-31-350 Navajo registered N27328 crashed into a mountain during snow squall in Cold Bay, Alaska, killing the sole occupant of the plane, the pilot.
- On May 3, 1996, a Swearingen SA227AC Metro III registered N670PA crashed during landing at St. George Island Airport, Alaska, injuring all 13 people on board.
- On August 11, 1996, a Grumman G-21A Goose registered N660PA crashed into the sea off Dutch Harbour, killing the two occupants.
- On January 30, 1998, a Cessna 208 Caravan I registered N9316F crashed near Port Heiden Airport, Alaska, after stalling due to atmospheric icing, injuring the pilot.
- On October 10, 2001, Peninsula Airways (PenAir) Flight 350, a Cessna 208 Caravan (N9530F) on a scheduled flight from Dillingham, Alaska to King Salmon, Alaska, crashed shortly after takeoff from Dillingham Airport. The pilot and all nine passengers were fatally injured, and the airplane was destroyed on impact. There was no fire.
- On October 17, 2019, PenAir Flight 3296, a Saab 2000 (N686PA) on a scheduled flight from Anchorage, Alaska to Unalaska, Alaska, went off the runway after landing at the Unalaska Airport, teetering over a bank toward a nearby body of water. The left propeller was destroyed and at least part of one blade entered the passenger cabin. An eyewitness reported high winds at the time of the accident. There were 39 passengers, including a high school swim team from Cordova, Alaska, and 3 flight crew aboard the flight. One passenger was fatally injured, two passengers were critically injured, and 10 more received medical care at a local hospital. There was no fire.

== See also ==
- List of seaplane operators
