= Chignik Bay =

Chignik Bay may refer to:

- Chignik Bay, a bay located off Chignik, Alaska
- Chignik Bay Seaplane Base, a seaplane base in the Chignik bay Alaska
