= Igiugig Airport =

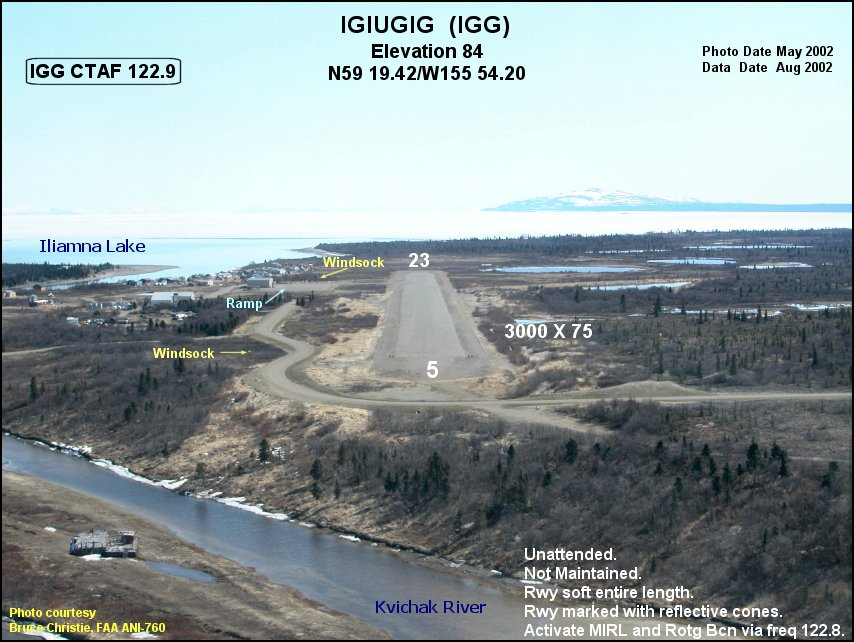
- IATA: IGG; ICAO: PAIG; FAA LID: IGG

Summary
- Airport type: Public
- Owner: State of Alaska DOT&PF - Central Region
- Serves: Igiugig, Alaska
- Elevation AMSL: 90 ft (27 m)
- Coordinates: 59°19′27″N 155°54′06″W

Map
- Location of airport in Alaska

Runways
Direction	Length		Surface
Direction	ft	m	Surface
5/23	3,000	914	Gravel

Statistics (2006)
- Aircraft operations: 7,900
- Enplanements (2008): 626
- Source: Federal Aviation Administration

Igiugig Airport (IATA: IGG, ICAO: PAIG, FAA LID: IGG) is a state-owned, public-use airport serving Igiugig, in the Lake and Peninsula Borough of the U.S. state of Alaska. Scheduled airline service to King Salmon Airport is provided by Peninsula Airways (PenAir).

As per Federal Aviation Administration records, this airport had 626 commercial passenger boardings (enplanements) in calendar year 2008, a decrease of 1% from the 631 enplanements in 2007. Igiugig Airport is included in the FAA's National Plan of Integrated Airport Systems (2009–2013), which categorizes it as a general aviation facility.

== Facilities and aircraft ==
Igiugig Airport has one runway designated 5/23 with a gravel surface measuring 3,000 by 75 feet (914 x 23 m). The airport is unattended. For the 12-month period ending December 31, 2006, the airport had 7,900 aircraft operations, an average of 21 per day: 87% general aviation and 13% air taxi.

== Airlines and destinations ==
Airlines	Destinations
Grant Aviation	Dillingham, King Salmon, Levelock

== See also ==
- List of airports in Alaska
