= Igyaraq =

Igyaraq may refer to:

- Igiugig, Alaska
- Chignik Lake, Alaska
