= Chignik Fisheries Airport =

Airport in Alaska, United States

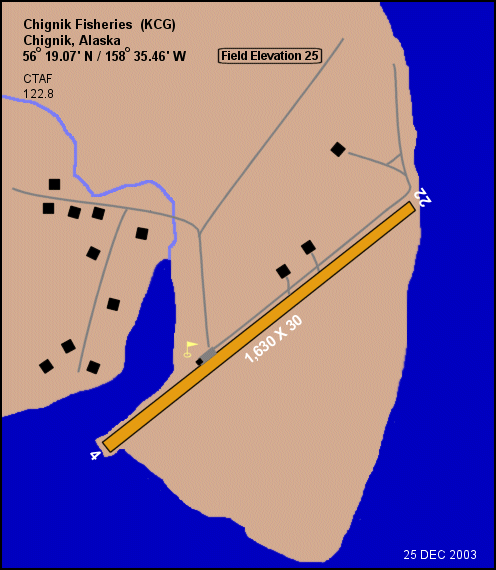
- IATA: KCG; ICAO: none; FAA LID: KCG

Summary
- Airport type: Public
- Serves: Chignik, Alaska
- Elevation AMSL: 25 ft / 8 m
- Coordinates: 56°19′04″N 158°35′27″W

Map
- Location of airport in Alaska

Runways
Direction	Length		Surface
Direction	ft	m	Surface
4/22	1,630	497	Gravel
- Source: Federal Aviation Administration

Chignik Fisheries Airport (IATA: KCG, FAA LID: KCG) was a public-use airport located 6 nautical miles (11 km) northwest of Chignik, a city in the Lake and Peninsula Borough of the U.S. state of Alaska.

== Facilities and aircraft ==
Chignik Fisheries Airport had one runway designated 4/22 with a gravel surface measuring 1,630 by 30 feet (497 x 9 m). The airport had an average of 33 aircraft operations per month: 62% air taxi and 37% general aviation.

== See also ==
- Chignik Airport (IATA: KCG, ICAO: PAJC, FAA LID: AJC)
- Chignik Bay Seaplane Base (IATA: KBW, FAA LID: Z78)
- Chignik Lagoon Airport (IATA: KCL, FAA LID: KCL)
- Chignik Lake Airport (IATA: KCQ, FAA LID: A79)
