= Fort Morrow Army Airfield =

Airport in Alaska, United States

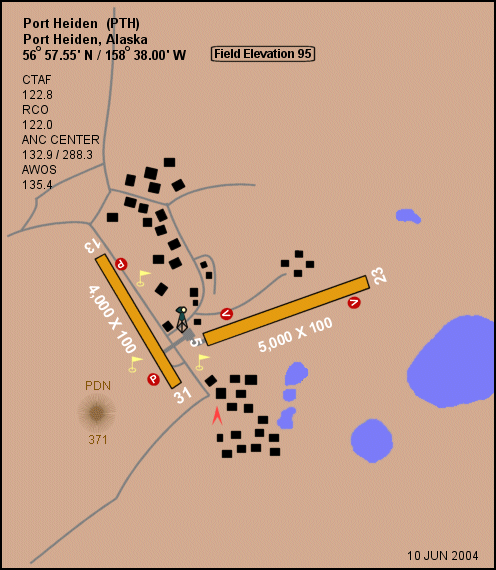
- IATA: none; ICAO: none

Summary
- Airport type: Military
- Owner: United States Army
- Serves: Port Heiden, Alaska
- Elevation AMSL: 95 ft / 29 m
- Coordinates: 56°57′33″N 158°38′00″W

Map
- Location of airport in Alaska

Runways
Direction	Length		Surface
Direction	ft	m	Surface
5/23	5,000	1,524	Gravel
13/31	4,000	1,219	Gravel

Fort Morrow Army Airfield is a former United States Army airfield and radar station located six nautical miles (7 mi, 11 km) northeast of the central business district of Port Heiden, in the Lake and Peninsula Borough of the U.S. state of Alaska. Following its closure and remediation of toxic substances, it was redeveloped into Port Heiden Airport.

Two early American forts were also called "Fort Morrow". One was a stockade built in Ohio during the War of 1812, now in Delaware State Park. Another in Tennessee was built under the direction of Capt. John Morrow and usually called "Fort Marr"; it confined the Cherokee in 1837 shortly before the Trail of Tears and is now part of Hiwassee/Ocoee Scenic River State Park.

== History ==
The field was built in 1942 after the World War II Japanese attack on the Aleutian Islands. On 17 June 1942 the United States Army established a garrison of 1,400 officers and enlisted men at Port Heiden on the north side of the Alaska Peninsula, with the mission of developing and holding an air base intermediate between the Kodiak and Cold Bay fields, this new garrison becoming the Army's Fort Morrow Army Airfield. The airfield did not have any permanent assigned units during the war, but hosted numerous temporary assigned USAAF and Naval Air units during the Aleutian Campaign and aided in the defense of Kodiak Island.

== See also ==
- Alaska World War II Army Airfields
