= List of shipwrecks in May 1939 =

The list of shipwrecks in May 1939 includes ships sunk, foundered, grounded, or otherwise lost during May 1939.

== 1 May ==
List of shipwrecks: 1 May 1939
Ship	State	Description
Bengt Sture	Sweden	The cargo ship ran aground at Berwick upon Tweed, Northumberland, United Kingdom. She was later refloated undamaged.

== 4 May ==
List of shipwrecks: 4 May 1939
Ship	State	Description
Bardaland	Sweden	The cargo ship ran aground off Danzig, Germany owing to failure of her steering gear. She was refloated later that day.
Malacca Maru	Japan	The cargo ship was driven ashore near Wood Island and broke in two.

== 5 May ==
List of shipwrecks: 5 May 1939
Ship	State	Description
Mayon	United States	The cargo ship ran aground south of the Apo Lighthouse, Negros Island, Philippines. She was refloated on 22 May and sailed to Manila, Philippines for repairs.

== 6 May ==
List of shipwrecks: 6 May 1939
Ship	State	Description
Seisho Maru	Japan	The cargo ship ran aground in Tokyo Bay. She was refloated undamaged later that day.
Vathy of Samos	Greece	The cargo ship ran aground at Kalloni.

== 7 May ==
List of shipwrecks: 7 May 1939
Ship	State	Description
Kalipso	Australia	The coaster caught fire and sank in the Clarence River, New South Wales.

== 9 May ==
List of shipwrecks: 9 May 1939
Ship	State	Description
Alsia	Denmark	The cargo liner caught fire 20 nautical miles (37 km) south of Barberyn Lighthouse, Ceylon. The crew and passengers abandoned ship and all passengers and most of the crew were taken on board Canton (United Kingdom) with the remaining crew taken off by Grasshopper (United Kingdom). Alsia came ashore, still burning, at Uduwata Point, 2 nautical miles (3.7 km) north of Galle, on 11 May. The gutted ship broke her back and was a total loss.
Arantzazu Mendi	Spain	The cargo ship ran aground at Kearney Point, County Down, United Kingdom. She broke her back on 14 May, and was consequently scrapped.
Dorothy Luckenbach	United States	The tanker ran aground in the Crocket Channel. She was refloated undamaged on 11 May.
Hochelaga	Canada	The cargo ship ran aground at Charlottetown, Prince Edward Island. She was refloated the next day.
Lindenbank	United Kingdom	The cargo ship ran aground on Arena Island, Sulu Sea, Philippines. She was refloated the next day but then sank 5 nautical miles (9.3 km) off the island. Her crew were rescued by USS Pope (United States Navy).
Malacca Maru	Japan	The cargo ship ran aground on Wood Island whilst on a voyage from Singapore to Osaka and broke her back. She was declared a total loss.
HMAS Tattoo	Royal Australian Navy	The S-class destroyer was scuttled in the Pacific Ocean off the coast of New South Wales.

== 10 May ==
List of shipwrecks: 10 May 1939
Ship	State	Description
Medée	France	The cargo ship ran aground at Ouistreham, Calvados.
Villa Franca	Portugal	The cargo ship ran aground at Le Havre, Seine-Inférieure, France. She was refloated the next day.

== 11 May ==
List of shipwrecks: 11 May 1939
Ship	State	Description
Pikepool	United Kingdom	The cargo ship ran aground in the Uruguay River 6 nautical miles (11 km) downstream of Fray Bentos, Uruguay. She was refloated on 18 May.

== 12 May ==
List of shipwrecks: 12 May 1939
Ship	State	Description
Comol Rico	United States	The tanker ran aground at Port Eads, Louisiana. She was refloated the next day.

== 13 May ==
List of shipwrecks: 13 May 1939
Ship	State	Description
Prestatyn Rose	United Kingdom	The cargo ship ran aground at Llanelli, Carmarthenshire. She was refloated later that day.

== 15 May ==
List of shipwrecks: 15 May 1939
Ship	State	Description
Fjeld	Norway	The cargo ship ran aground at Nantes, Loire-Inférieure, France. She was refloated later that day with severe damage.
Signfred	Sweden	The cargo ship ran aground at Kalmar. She was refloated damaged on 17 May and sailed to Oscarshamn for repairs.

== 16 May ==
List of shipwrecks: 16 May 1939
Ship	State	Description
Colne	United Kingdom	The Thames barge collided with San Andres (Norway) in the River Thames at Blackwall Point and was severely damaged. She was beached at Point Wharf, Greenwich.

== 17 May ==
List of shipwrecks: 17 May 1939
Ship	State	Description
Aden	United Kingdom	The dredger capsized in the North Sea (55°38′N 1°20′W) whilst under tow.

== 18 May ==
List of shipwrecks: 18 May 1939
Ship	State	Description
Benjamin F. Packard	United States	The full-rigged ship was scuttled off Long Island, New York.

== 19 May ==
List of shipwrecks: 19 May 1939
Ship	State	Description
Rosedene	United Kingdom	The coaster ran aground at Saint-Valery-sur-Somme, Somme, France. She was refloated undamaged the next day.

== 20 May ==
List of shipwrecks: 20 May 1939
Ship	State	Description
Aquarius	United States	The cargo ship caught fire whilst laid up at New Orleans, Louisiana and was severely damaged.
Gunny	Sweden	The cargo ship ran aground at Gisslan and was severely damaged. She was refloated on 22 May and sailed to Gefle.
Silver Sword	United States	The cargo ship ran aground at Port Eads, Louisiana. She was refloated the next day.

== 21 May ==
List of shipwrecks: 21 May 1939
Ship	State	Description
Consul Hintz	Germany	The cargo ship ran aground on Someri, Finland. She was refloated the next day. Consul Hintz arrived on 28 May at Helsinki for drydocking.
Eha	Estonia	The cargo ship ran aground on Märket, in the Baltic Sea and became waterlogged. Her crew abandoned ship.
Saimaa	Finland	The cargo ship ran aground on Someri.

== 22 May ==
List of shipwrecks: 22 May 1939
Ship	State	Description
Dicky	United Kingdom	The cargo ship collided in the River Thames at Rainham, Essex with Valparaiso (Sweden) and was extensively damaged. She was beached to prevent her sinking. Dicky was refloated on 24 May.
Kankyo Maru	Japan	Tsunchiko Maru (Japan) collided with Kankyo Maru at Shimonoseki, damaging her severely. Tsunchiko Maru then collided with Zuiko Maru (Japan). Kankyo Maru sank with the loss of sixteen crew.

== 23 May ==
List of shipwrecks: 23 May 1939
Ship	State	Description
Souvenir	United States	The fishing vessel foundered in Dixon Entrance, on the border between the Territory of Alaska and British Columbia, Canada, 30–35 nautical miles (56–65 km; 35–40 mi) south-southeast of Duke Island in the Alexander Archipelago, Territory of Alaska. The motor vessel Mary Ellen (Flag unknown) rescued both people on board.
USS Squalus	United States Navy	The Sargo-class submarine sank off the Isles of Shoals with the loss of 26 crew. She was refloated, repaired, and recommissioned as USS Sailfish (United States Navy).

== 26 May ==
List of shipwrecks: 26 May 1939
Ship	State	Description
Huasco	Chile	The passenger ship capsized and sank in Talcahuano Bay.

== 27 May ==
List of shipwrecks: 27 May 1939
Ship	State	Description
France	United Kingdom	The cargo ship foundered in the Caribbean Sea off Georgetown, British Guiana.
Polzella	United Kingdom	The cargo ship became stranded on the Payung Reef, off Batavia (Jakarta), Netherlands East Indies. She was refloated on 1 June.
Yewmount	United Kingdom	The cargo ship ran aground at Deauville, Calvados, France. She was refloated undamaged later that day.

== 28 May ==
List of shipwrecks: 28 May 1939
Ship	State	Description
En Min	Manchukuo Imperial Navy	Dongan Incident: The On Min-class river patrol launch was severely damaged by machine gun fire by Soviet Border Troops in the Ussuri River, grounding on the Manchurian side of the river, a total loss.
