= KLL =

KLL or kll may refer to:

- KLL, the IATA code for Levelock Airport, Alaska, United States
- KLL, the station code for Kalol Junction railway station, Gujarat, India
- kll, the ISO 639-3 code for Kagan Kalagan language, Mindanao, Philippines
- KLL, the Karnin–Lang–Liberty algorithm for online estimation of statistical quantiles
