= Clarks Point Airport =

- IATA: CLP; ICAO: PFCL; FAA LID: CLP

Summary
- Airport type: Public
- Owner: State of Alaska DOT&PF - Central Region
- Serves: Clarks Point, Alaska
- Elevation AMSL: 80 ft (24 m)
- Coordinates: 58°50′01″N 158°31′46″W

Map
- Location of airport in Alaska

Runways
Direction	Length		Surface
Direction	ft	m	Surface
18/36	3,200	975	Gravel

Statistics (2015)
- Aircraft operations: 6,000 (2013)
- Based aircraft: 1
- Passengers: 867
- Freight: 28,000 lbs
- Source: Federal Aviation Administration

Clarks Point Airport (IATA: CLP, ICAO: PFCL, FAA LID: CLP) is a state-owned public-use airport located in Clarks Point, a city in the Dillingham Census Area of the U.S. state of Alaska.

As per Federal Aviation Administration records, the airport had 497 passenger boardings (enplanements) in calendar year 2008, an increase of 15% from the 432 enplanements in 2007. This airport is included in the FAA's National Plan of Integrated Airport Systems for 2009–2013, which categorized it as a general aviation facility.

== Facilities and aircraft ==
Clarks Point Airport covers an area of 114 acres (46 ha) at an elevation of 80 feet (24 m) above mean sea level. It has one runway designated 18/36 with a gravel surface measuring 3,200 by 60 feet (975 x 18 m). For the 12-month period ending December 31, 2008, the airport had 6,000 aircraft operations, an average of 16 per day: 67% air taxi and 33% general aviation.

== Airlines and destinations ==
Airlines	Destinations
Grant Aviation	Bethel, Dillingham, King Salmon, South Naknek

=== Statistics ===
Carrier shares: January – December 2015
Carrier	Passengers (arriving and departing)
Grant	867(100.00%)

Top domestic destinations: January – December 2015
Rank	City	Airport	Passengers
1	(Alaska) Dillingham, AK	Dillingham Airport	390
2	(Alaska) King Salmon, AK	King Salmon Airport	10
	(Alaska) South Naknek, AK	South Naknek Airport	10

== See also ==
- List of airports in Alaska
