= Chignik Bay Seaplane Base =

Seaplane base in Alaska, United States

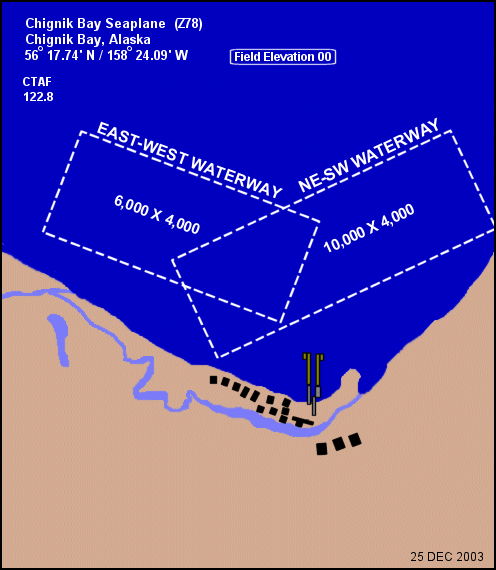
- IATA: KBW; ICAO: none; FAA LID: Z78

Summary
- Airport type: Public
- Owner: Public domain
- Serves: Chignik, Alaska
- Elevation AMSL: 0 ft (0 m)
- Coordinates: 56°17′44″N 158°24′05″W

Map
- Location of airport in Alaska

Runways
Direction	Length		Surface
Direction	ft	m	Surface
E/W	6,000	1,829	Water
NE/SW	10,000	3,048	Water

Statistics (2006)
- Aircraft operations: 210
- Source: Federal Aviation Administration

Chignik Bay Seaplane Base (IATA: KBW, FAA LID: Z78) is a public-use seaplane base serving Chignik, a city in the Lake and Peninsula Borough of the U.S. state of Alaska.

== Facilities and aircraft ==
Chignik Bay Seaplane Base has two seaplane landing areas: the E/W waterway is 6,000 by 4,000 feet (1,829 x 1,219 m) and the NE/SW waterway is 10,000 by 4,000 feet (3,048 x 1,219 m). The beach is used for aircraft pull-up. For the 12-month period ending December 31, 2006, the airport had 210 aircraft operations, an average of 17 per month: 95% general aviation and 5% air taxi.

== See also ==
- Chignik Airport (ICAO: PAJC, FAA LID: AJC)
- Chignik Fisheries Airport (IATA: KCG, FAA LID: KCG)
- Chignik Lagoon Airport (IATA: KCL, FAA LID: KCL)
- Chignik Lake Airport (IATA: KCQ, FAA LID: A79)
- List of airports in Alaska
