= South Naknek Airport =

South Naknek Airport South Naknek Nr 2 Airport
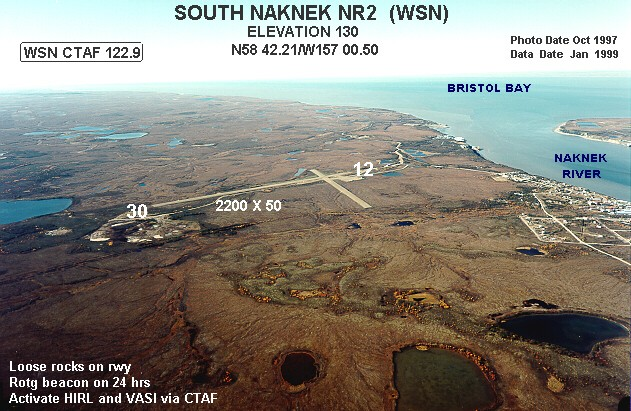
- IATA: WSN; ICAO: PFWS; FAA LID: WSN

Summary
- Airport type: Public
- Owner: State of Alaska DOT&PF - Central Region
- Serves: South Naknek, Alaska
- Elevation AMSL: 162 ft / 49 m
- Coordinates: 58°42′08″N 157°00′09″W

Map
- Location of airport in Alaska

Runways
Direction	Length		Surface
Direction	ft	m	Surface
4/22	2,264	690	Gravel
12/30	3,314	1,010	Gravel/dirt

Statistics (2008)
- Aircraft operations: 3,530
- Enplanements (2008): 330
- Source: Federal Aviation Administration

South Naknek Airport (IATA: WSN, ICAO: PFWS, FAA LID: WSN), also known as South Naknek Nr 2 Airport, is a state-owned public-use airport located one nautical mile (1.85 km) southwest of the central business district of South Naknek, in the Bristol Bay Borough of the U.S. state of Alaska.

As per Federal Aviation Administration records, this airport had 330 commercial passenger boardings (enplanements) in calendar year 2008, a decrease of 19% from the 409 enplanements in 2007. South Naknek Airport is included in the FAA's National Plan of Integrated Airport Systems (2009-2013), which categorizes it as a general aviation facility.

== Facilities and aircraft ==
South Naknek Airport covers an area of 214 acres (87 ha) at an elevation of 162 feet (49 m) above mean sea level. It has two runways: 4/22 is 2,264 by 60 feet (690 x 18 m) with a gravel surface; 12/30 is 3,314 by 60 feet (1,010 x 18 m) with a gravel and dirt surface.

For the 12-month period ending December 31, 2008, the airport had 3,530 aircraft operations, an average of 294 per month: 94% air taxi and 6% general aviation.

== Airlines and destinations ==
Airlines	Destinations
Grant Aviation	Clarks Point, Dillingham, King Salmon

== See also ==
- List of airports in Alaska
