= Levelock Airport =

Public airport in Alaska, United States of America

- IATA: KLL; ICAO: PAAI; FAA LID: 9Z8

Summary
- Airport type: Public
- Owner: Alaska DOT&PF
- Serves: Levelock, Alaska
- Elevation AMSL: 39 ft (12 m)
- Coordinates: 59°07′41″N 156°51′31″W

Map
- Location of airport in Alaska

Runways
Direction	Length		Surface
Direction	ft	m	Surface
1/19	3,281	1,000	Gravel

Statistics (2006)
- Aircraft operations: 1,466
- Enplanements (2008): 527
- Source: Federal Aviation Administration

Levelock Airport (IATA: KLL, ICAO: PAAI, FAA LID: 9Z8) is a public-use airport located one nautical mile (1.85 km) north of the central business district of Levelock, in the Lake and Peninsula Borough of the U.S. state of Alaska. Scheduled airline service to King Salmon Airport is provided by Grant Aviation.

According to Federal Aviation Administration (FAA) records, this airport had 527 commercial passenger boardings (enplanements) in calendar year 2008, a decrease of 22% from the 675 in 2007. Levelock Airport is included in the FAA's National Plan of Integrated Airport Systems (2009–2013), which categorizes it as a general aviation facility.

Although most U.S. airports use the same three-letter location identifier for the FAA and the International Air Transport Association (IATA), this airport is assigned 9Z8 by the FAA and KLL by IATA.

== Facilities and aircraft ==
Levelock Airport has one runway designated 1/19 with a gravel surface measuring 3,281 by 59 feet (1,000 x 18 m). The airport is unattended. For the 12-month period ending December 31, 2006, the airport had 1,466 aircraft operations, an average of 122 per month: 65% general aviation and 35% air taxi.

== Airlines and destinations ==
Airlines	Destinations
Grant Aviation	Dillingham, Igiugig, King Salmon

== See also ==
- List of airports in Alaska
