= Benjamin F. Packard =

Final Down Easter ship, 1883–1939

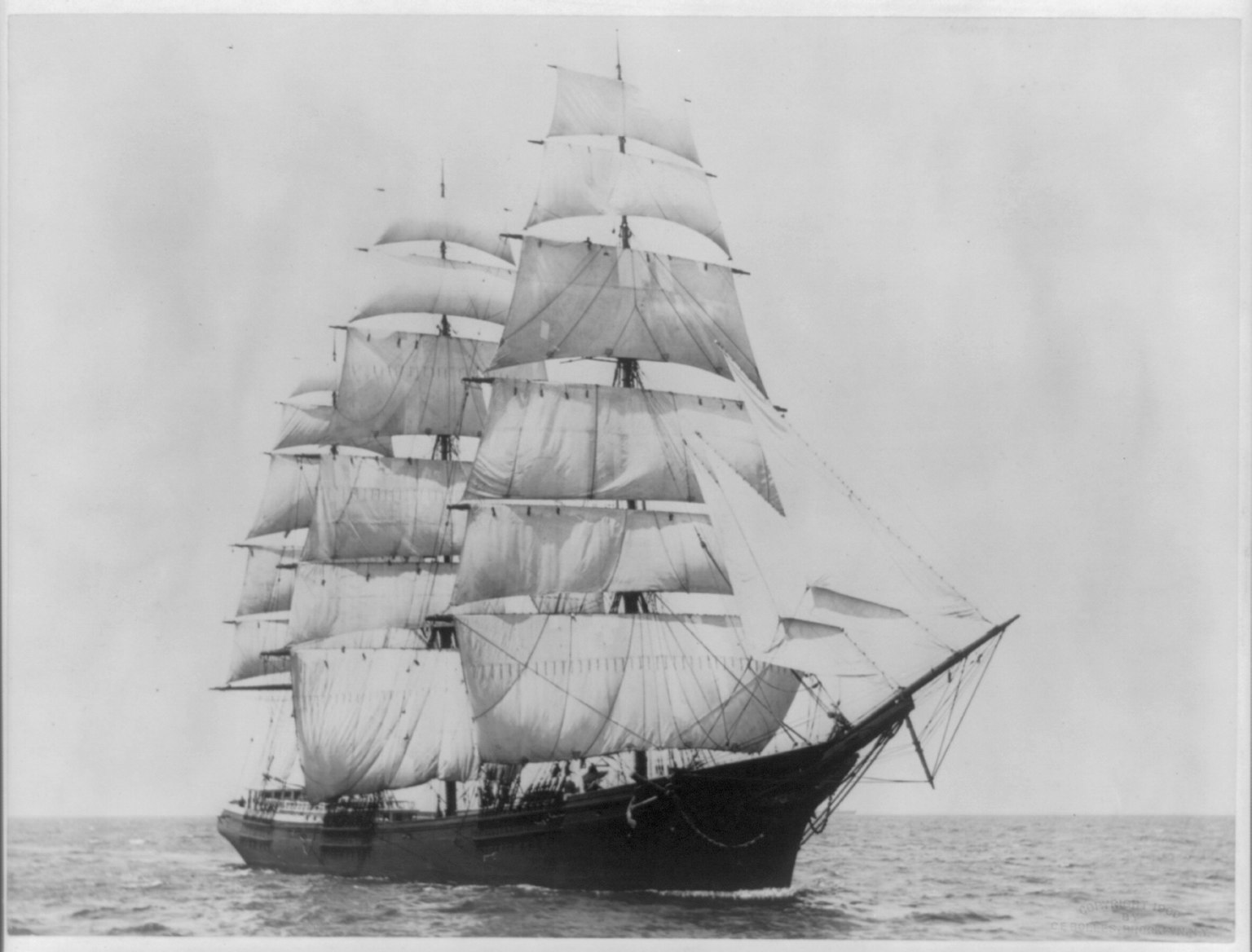
- 1900 photograph of Benjamin F. Packard by Charles E. Bolles

History

United States
- Builder: Goss, Sawyer & Packard, Bath, Maine
- Launched: November 15, 1883
- Fate: Scuttled on May 18, 1939

General characteristics
- Length: 244 ft 2 in (74.42 m) LOA
- Draft: 43 ft 4 in (13.21 m)

Benjamin F. Packard was an American Down Easter ship constructed in 1883. She was the last surviving Down Easter until her scuttling in 1939.

== History ==
=== Maritime career ===
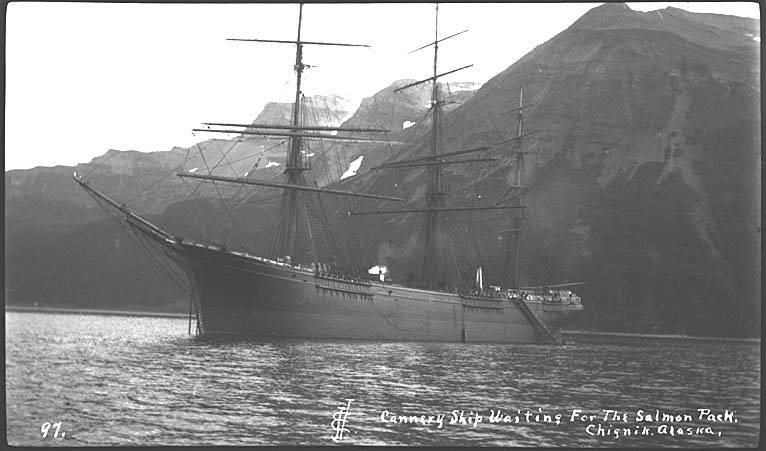
Benjamin F. Packard in Chignik, Alaska circa 1912

Benjamin F. Packard was launched in Bath, Maine on November 15, 1883. She was named for her shipwright. She was primarily used as a cargo ship during her career. She held a reputation as a "hell-ship."

On April 17, 1911, she was one of three ships that blew ashore in Chignik, Alaska. She was repaired and returned to service.

The Benjamin F. Packard declined in use in the 1920s, undergoing a final voyage as a barge in 1927. The historic value of the ship was noted at the time, and the press called for her to be saved. She was ultimately sold as an "antique" in 1929.

=== Playland ===
Benjamin F. Packard was brought to Playland in 1930, where she was repurposed into an attraction. Among other things, she was depicted as a pirate ship and used as a dancing area.

=== Scuttling ===
The 1938 New England hurricane seriously damaged the Benjamin F. Packard. It was determined that the ship could not be saved. She was scuttled off of Long Island Sound on May 18, 1939. Parts of her can still be seen at Edith G. Read Wildlife Sanctuary in Rye, New York at low tide.

== Legacy ==
The cabin and its furnishings were saved and were taken by Mystic Seaport, where they remain to this day. They are used to teach the history of the New England cargo trade. Some artifacts are also at the Maine Maritime Museum.

The home of her namesake in Bath, Maine was turned into a bed and breakfast.

The decision to scuttle rather than save the final Down Easter is used as a case study on why vessels are or are not preserved.
