= Chignik Lagoon, Alaska =

Chignik Lagoon, Alaska Nanwarnaq
- Census-designated place
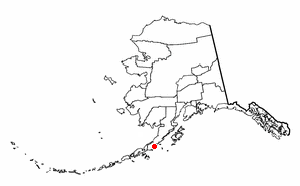
- Location of Chignik Lagoon, Alaska
- Coordinates: 56°18′27″N 158°32′6″W
- Country: United States
- State: Alaska
- Borough: Lake and Peninsula

Government
  - Borough mayor: Glen Alsworth, Sr.
  - State senator: Lyman Hoffman (D)
  - State rep.: Bryce Edgmon (I)

Area
  - Total: 13.25 sq mi (34.32 km^{2})
  - Land: 13.25 sq mi (34.32 km^{2})
  - Water: 0 sq mi (0.00 km^{2})

Population (2020)
  - Total: 72
  - Density: 5.4/sq mi (2.1/km^{2})
- Time zone: UTC-9 (Alaska (AKST))
  - Summer (DST): UTC-8 (AKDT)
- ZIP code: 99565
- Area code: 907
- FIPS code: 02-13670

Chignik Lagoon (Alutiiq: Nanwarnaq) is a census-designated place (CDP) in Lake and Peninsula Borough, Alaska, United States. At the 2020 census, the population was 72.

== Geography ==
Chignik Lagoon is at 56°18′27″N 158°32′6″W (56.307535, -158.535023), on the southeast shore of the tidal inlet of the same name. It is bordered to the east by the city of Chignik.

According to the United States Census Bureau, the CDP has an area of 13.8 square miles (35.7 km^{2}), all of it land.

In 2009 the Marines of 4th Combat Engineer Battalion, 4th Marine Division, began work on an inter-village road system to link Chignik Lake to Chignik Lagoon. This is the first phase of potentially creating road links between Chignik Lagoon, Chignik Lake and Chignik.

== Demographics ==
Historical population
| Census | Pop. | Note | %± |
|---|---|---|---|
| 1960 | 108 | | — |
| 1980 | 48 | | — |
| 1990 | 53 | | 10.4% |
| 2000 | 103 | | 94.3% |
| 2010 | 78 | | −24.3% |
| 2020 | 72 | | −7.7% |
U.S. Decennial Census

Chignik Lagoon first appeared on the 1960 U.S. Census as an unincorporated village (although it probably had been a part of the earlier Chignik Bay settlement listed on the 1890 & 1910 U.S. Censuses when it was the site of some canneries). It did not appear on the 1970 census, but was made a census-designated place in 1980 and has appeared on every census since to date (2010).

As of the census of 2000, there were 103 people, 33 households, and 22 families residing in the CDP. The population density was 7.9 inhabitants per square mile (3.1/km^{2}). There were 68 housing units at an average density of 5.2 per square mile (2.0/km^{2}). The racial makeup of the CDP was 11.65% White, 0.97% Black or African American, 81.55% Native American, and 5.83% from two or more races.

There were 33 households, out of which 48.5% had children under the age of 18 living with them, 60.6% were married couples living together, and 33.3% were non-families. 24.2% of all households were made up of individuals, and 3.0% had someone living alone who was 65 years of age or older. The average household size was 3.12 and the average family size was 3.95.

In the CDP, the population was spread out, with 31.1% under the age of 18, 16.5% from 18 to 24, 27.2% from 25 to 44, 18.4% from 45 to 64, and 6.8% who were 65 years of age or older. The median age was 26 years. For every 100 females, there were 134.1 males. For every 100 females age 18 and over, there were 184.0 males.

The median income for a household in the CDP was $92,297, and the median income for a family was $99,054. Males had a median income of $33,750 versus $38,750 for females. The per capita income for the CDP was $28,941. There were no families and 1.8% of the population living below the poverty line, including no under eighteens and none of those over 64.
