= Perryville, Alaska =

Perryville, Alaska Perry-q
- Census-designated place
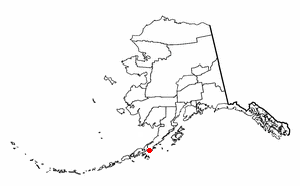
- Location of Perryville, Alaska
- Coordinates: 55°54′49″N 159°9′4″W
- Country: United States
- State: Alaska
- Borough: Lake and Peninsula

Government
  - Borough mayor: Glen Alsworth, Sr.
  - State senator: Lyman Hoffman (D)
  - State rep.: Bryce Edgmon (I)

Area
  - Total: 11.17 sq mi (28.94 km^{2})
  - Land: 11.17 sq mi (28.93 km^{2})
  - Water: 0.0077 sq mi (0.02 km^{2})

Population (2020)
  - Total: 88
  - Density: 7.9/sq mi (3.04/km^{2})
- Time zone: UTC-9 (Alaska (AKST))
  - Summer (DST): UTC-8 (AKDT)
- ZIP code: 99648
- Area code: 907
- FIPS code: 02-60200

Perryville (Alutiiq: Perry-q) is a census-designated place (CDP) in Lake and Peninsula Borough, Alaska, United States. The population was 88 at the 2020 census, down from 113 in 2010.

== History ==
Mount Katmai erupted on June 6, 1912, permanently displacing many local native people. One month after the eruption, 78 of the Katmai refugees boarded the U.S. revenue cutter Manning to return to the Alaska Peninsula and establish a new village. After a failed first village site selection, the natives were relocated yet again to a spot 200 miles (320 km) southwest of Mt. Katmai. The new settlement was named "Perry", and later became known as "Perryville", for K.W. Perry, captain of the Manning.

On July 29, 2021, a M8.2 Earthquake struck 104 km SE of Perryville.

== Geography ==
Perryville is located in southwestern Lake and Peninsula Borough at 55°54′49″N 159°09′04″W. It sits on the south shore of the Alaska Peninsula at the mouth of the Kametolook River and faces the Chiachi Islands about 2 miles (3 km) out in the Pacific Ocean. It is served by Perryville Airport.

According to the United States Census Bureau, the Perryville CDP has a total area of 11.2 square miles (28.9 km^{2}), of which 0.02 square miles (0.05 km^{2}), or 0.18%, are water.

== Demographics ==
Historical population
Census	Pop.	Note	%±
1920	85		—
1930	93		9.4%
1940	92		−1.1%
1960	111		—
1970	94		−15.3%
1980	111		18.1%
1990	108		−2.7%
2000	107		−0.9%
2010	113		5.6%
2020	88		−22.1%
U.S. Decennial Census

Perryville first appeared on the 1920 U.S. Census as an unincorporated village (also listed under the alternative name of Chignik Post Office). It reported in every successive census except for 1950, when it did not appear. It was made a census-designated place (CDP) in 1980.

As of the census of 2000, there were 107 people, 33 households, and 23 families residing in the CDP. The population density was 11.6 inhabitants per square mile (4.5/km^{2}). There were 45 housing units at an average density of 4.9 per square mile (1.9/km^{2}). The racial makeup of the CDP was 1.87% White, 97.20% Native American, and 0.93% from two or more races.

There were 33 households, out of which 51.5% had children under the age of 18 living with them, 45.5% were married couples living together, 18.2% had a female householder with no husband present, and 30.3% were non-families. 27.3% of all households were made up of individuals, and 3.0% had someone living alone who was 65 years of age or older. The average household size was 3.24 and the average family size was 4.04.

In the CDP, the population was spread out, with 39.3% under the age of 18, 10.3% from 18 to 24, 26.2% from 25 to 44, 20.6% from 45 to 64, and 3.7% who were 65 years of age or older. The median age was 26 years. For every 100 females, there were 118.4 males. For every 100 females age 18 and over, there were 103.1 males.

The median income for a household in the CDP was $51,875, and the median income for a family was $54,583. Males had a median income of $0 versus $38,750 for females. The per capita income for the CDP was $20,935. There were 5.3% of families and 16.0% of the population living below the poverty line, including 12.5% of under eighteens and none of those over 64.
