= Chignik, Alaska =

City in Alaska, United States

Chignik, Alaska Cirniq
- City
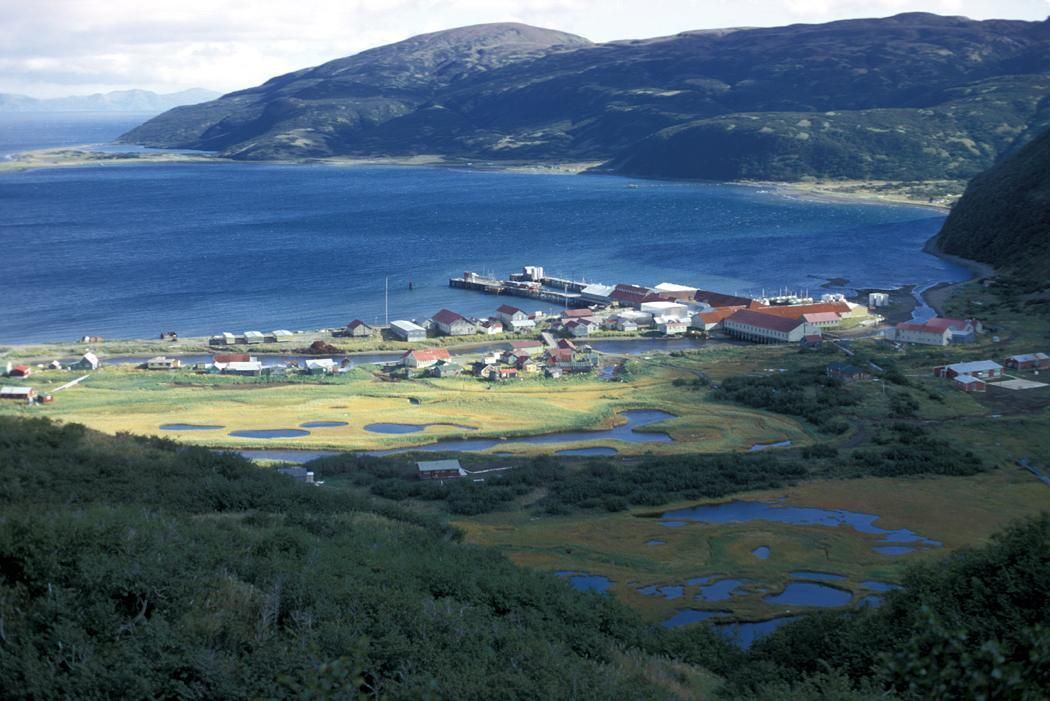
- Chignik from above

- Location in Alaska
- Coordinates: 56°17′54″N 158°24′16″W
- Country: United States
- State: Alaska
- Borough: Lake and Peninsula
- Incorporated: May 16, 1983

Government
  - Mayor: Robert Carpenter
  - State senator: Lyman Hoffman (D)
  - State rep.: Bryce Edgmon (I)

Area
  - Total: 15.85 sq mi (41.06 km^{2})
  - Land: 10.95 sq mi (28.35 km^{2})
  - Water: 4.90 sq mi (12.70 km^{2})
- Elevation: 0 ft (0 m)

Population (2020)
  - Total: 97
  - Density: 8.9/sq mi (3.42/km^{2})
- Time zone: UTC-9 (Alaska (AKST))
  - Summer (DST): UTC-8 (AKDT)
- ZIP codes: 99548, 99564
- Area code: 907
- FIPS code: 02-13550
- GNIS feature ID: 1400269

Chignik (Alutiiq: Cirniq) is a city in Lake and Peninsula Borough, Alaska, United States. It is two hundred and fifty miles southwest of Kodiak. At the 2020 census the population was 97, up from 91 in 2010.

== History ==
On April 17, 1911, a gale blew ashore numerous ships such as the Benjamin F. Packard, the Star of Alaska, and the Jabez Howes, a three-masted, full-rigged ship owned by the Columbia River Packers Association and used as a cannery tender.

== Geography ==
Chignik is located at 56°17′54″N 158°24′16″W (56.298297, −158.404402).

According to the United States Census Bureau, the city has a total area of 16 square miles (41 km^{2}), 12 sq mi (31 km^{2}) of it is land and 4 sq mi (10 km^{2}) is water.

== Demographics ==
Historical population
Census	Pop.	Note	%±
1940	224		—
1950	253		12.9%
1960	99		−60.9%
1970	83		−16.2%
1980	178		114.5%
1990	188		5.6%
2000	79		−58.0%
2010	91		15.2%
2020	97		6.6%
U.S. Decennial Census

Chignik first appeared on the 1940 U.S. Census as an unincorporated village, although it was preceded by "Chignik Bay", which may have included the village and canneries in the surrounding area, including Chignik Lagoon. Chignik Bay reported a population of 193 in 1890 (which was majority Asian (121), with 66 White residents, 5 Native Alaskans & 1 Other). It did not report again until 1910 when it had a total of 566 residents, which made it the 13th largest community in the territory of Alaska. This was the last time it appeared on the census until Chignik in 1940.

=== 2020 census ===
As of the 2020 census, Chignik had a population of 97. The median age was 40.3 years. 26.8% of residents were under the age of 18 and 7.2% of residents were 65 years of age or older. For every 100 females there were 94.0 males, and for every 100 females age 18 and over there were 108.8 males age 18 and over.

0.0% of residents lived in urban areas, while 100.0% lived in rural areas.

There were 43 households in Chignik, of which 41.9% had children under the age of 18 living in them. Of all households, 46.5% were married-couple households, 16.3% were households with a male householder and no spouse or partner present, and 23.3% were households with a female householder and no spouse or partner present. About 27.9% of all households were made up of individuals and 9.4% had someone living alone who was 65 years of age or older.

There were 87 housing units, of which 50.6% were vacant. The homeowner vacancy rate was 0.0% and the rental vacancy rate was 0.0%.

Racial composition as of the 2020 census
Race	Number	Percent
White	20	20.6%
Black or African American	1	1.0%
American Indian and Alaska Native	58	59.8%
Asian	3	3.1%
Native Hawaiian and Other Pacific Islander	0	0.0%
Some other race	0	0.0%
Two or more races	15	15.5%
Hispanic or Latino (of any race)	5	5.2%

=== 2000 census ===
As of the census of 2000, there were 79 people, 29 households, and 20 families residing in the city. The population density was 7 per square mile (3/km^{2}). There were 80 housing units at an average density of 7 per square mile (3/km^{2}). The racial makeup of the city was 32% white, 61% Native American, 3% Asian, 3% Pacific Islander, 1% from other races, and 1% from two or more races. 1% of the population were Hispanic or Latino of any race.

There were 29 households; 11 had children under the age of 18 living with them, 19 were married couples living together, 2 had a female householder with no husband present, and 8 were non-families. Seven households were individuals, and 10 consisted of a sole occupant 65 years of age or older. The average household size was 2.7 and the average family size was 3.3.

In the city, the age distribution of the population shows 25% under the age of 18, 14% from 18 to 24, 33% from 25 to 44, 23% from 45 to 64, and 5% who were 65 years of age or older. The median age was 36 years. For every 100 females, there were 114 males. For every 100 females age 18 and over, there were 111 males.

The median income for a household in the city was $34,000, and the median income for a family was $51,000. The male and female median incomes were equal, at $31,250. The per capita income for Chignik was $16,000. 5% of the population lived below the poverty line; none were under 18 or over 64 years old.

== Notable people ==
- Benny Benson (1913–1972), the designer of the Alaskan Flag, was born in Chignik

== Climate ==
The climate present in Chignik is a typical subarctic climate (Köppen: Dfc), however it is mild when compared to other Alaskan towns with this climate type, for example Fairbanks or Fort Yukon.

Climate data for Chignik, Alaska
Month	Jan	Feb	Mar	Apr	May	Jun	Jul	Aug	Sep	Oct	Nov	Dec	Year
Record high °F (°C)	48 (9)	48 (9)	50 (10)	56 (13)	69 (21)	72 (22)	76 (24)	76 (24)	75 (24)	63 (17)	57 (14)	55 (13)	76 (24)
Mean daily maximum °F (°C)	31.1 (−0.5)	32.5 (0.3)	34.7 (1.5)	39.5 (4.2)	46.4 (8.0)	54.9 (12.7)	61.0 (16.1)	60.8 (16.0)	54.9 (12.7)	45.4 (7.4)	38.4 (3.6)	34.0 (1.1)	44.5 (6.9)
Daily mean °F (°C)	25.4 (−3.7)	26.8 (−2.9)	29.0 (−1.7)	33.8 (1.0)	40.7 (4.8)	48.1 (8.9)	53.6 (12.0)	53.7 (12.1)	48.1 (8.9)	39.7 (4.3)	33.1 (0.6)	28.7 (−1.8)	38.4 (3.6)
Mean daily minimum °F (°C)	19.8 (−6.8)	21.1 (−6.1)	23.3 (−4.8)	28.1 (−2.2)	34.9 (1.6)	41.2 (5.1)	46.1 (7.8)	46.6 (8.1)	41.3 (5.2)	34.0 (1.1)	27.7 (−2.4)	23.6 (−4.7)	32.3 (0.2)
Record low °F (°C)	−12 (−24)	−9 (−23)	−10 (−23)	5 (−15)	15 (−9)	21 (−6)	31 (−1)	33 (1)	27 (−3)	14 (−10)	−3 (−19)	−5 (−21)	−12 (−24)
Average precipitation inches (mm)	5.88 (149)	7.61 (193)	6.90 (175)	4.87 (124)	6.74 (171)	6.02 (153)	4.31 (109)	5.08 (129)	9.74 (247)	8.83 (224)	10.06 (256)	7.22 (183)	83.27 (2,115)
Average snowfall inches (cm)	7.5 (19)	14.6 (37)	6.5 (17)	6.7 (17)	0.9 (2.3)	0 (0)	0 (0)	0 (0)	0 (0)	0.5 (1.3)	5.2 (13)	4.5 (11)	46.3 (118)
Source: WRCC
