= Port Heiden, Alaska =

City in Alaska, United States

Port Heiden, Alaska Masrriq
- City
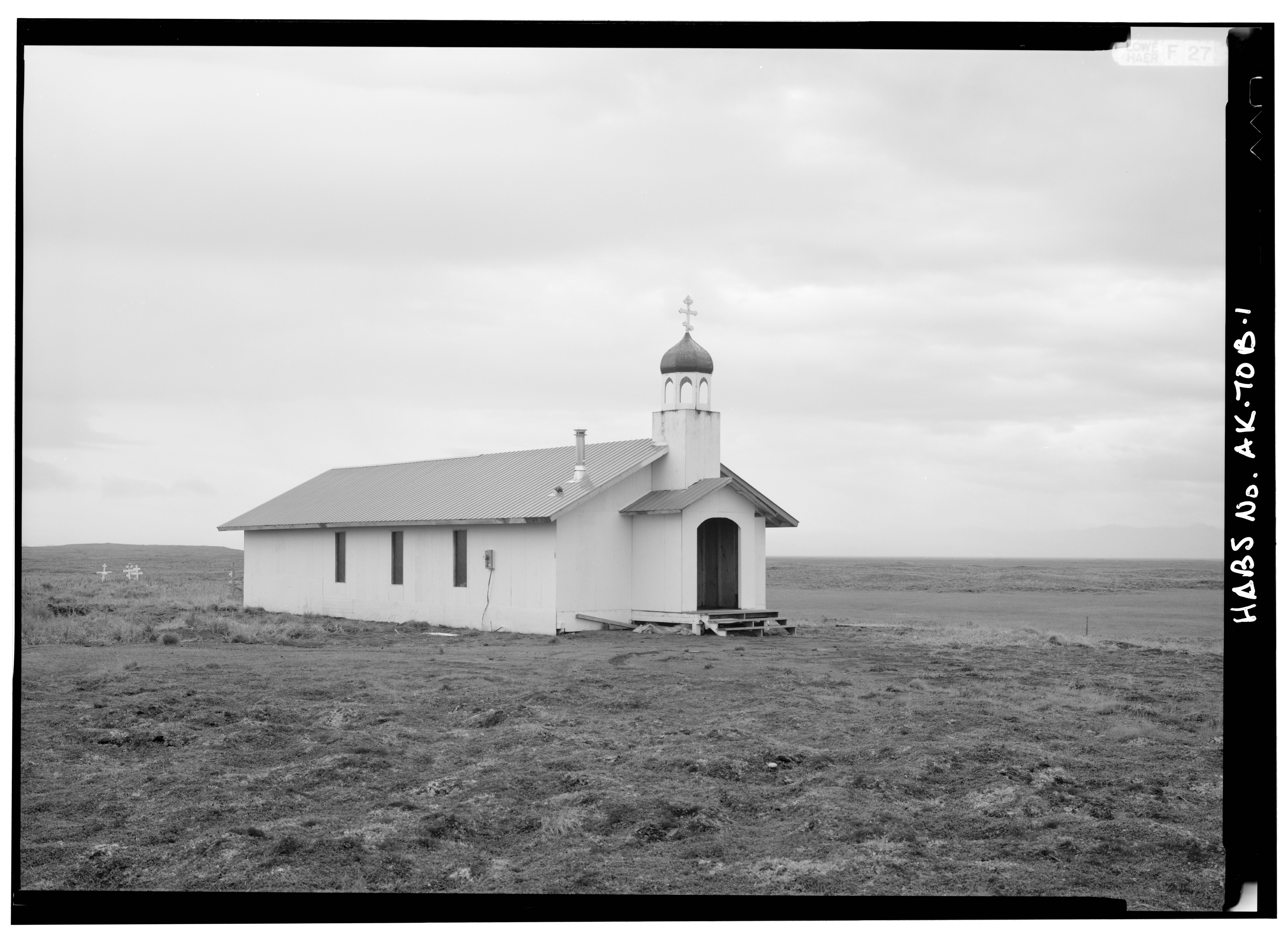
- St. Matrona Russian Orthodox Church

- Location in Alaska
- Coordinates: 56°56′56″N 158°39′21″W
- Country: United States
- State: Alaska
- Borough: Lake and Peninsula
- Incorporated: November 20, 1972

Government
  - Mayor: James Christensen
  - State senator: Lyman Hoffman (D)
  - State rep.: Bryce Edgmon (I)

Area
  - Total: 47.37 sq mi (122.69 km^{2})
  - Land: 46.76 sq mi (121.12 km^{2})
  - Water: 0.61 sq mi (1.57 km^{2})
- Elevation: 95 ft (29 m)

Population (2020)
  - Total: 100
  - Density: 2.1/sq mi (0.83/km^{2})
- Time zone: UTC-9 (Alaska (AKST))
  - Summer (DST): UTC-8 (AKDT)
- ZIP code: 99549
- Area code: 907
- FIPS code: 02-63390
- GNIS feature ID: 1669438

Port Heiden (Alutiiq: Masrriq) is a city in Lake and Peninsula Borough, Alaska, United States. As of the 2020 census, the population of the city is 100, slightly down from 102 in 2010.

== Geography and climate ==
Port Heiden is located at 56°56′56″N 158°39′21″W (56.948949, -158.655745).

According to the United States Census Bureau, the city has a total area of 51.4 square miles (133 km^{2}), of which, 50.7 square miles (131 km^{2}) of it is land and 0.7 square miles (1.8 km^{2}) of it (1.28%) is water.

Port Heiden has a subarctic climate (Köppen Dfc).

Climate data for Port Heiden (1961–1990 normals, extremes 1942–1988)
| Month | Jan | Feb | Mar | Apr | May | Jun | Jul | Aug | Sep | Oct | Nov | Dec | Year |
|---|---|---|---|---|---|---|---|---|---|---|---|---|---|
| Record high °F (°C) | 57 (14) | 55 (13) | 54 (12) | 62 (17) | 75 (24) | 81 (27) | 87 (31) | 82 (28) | 73 (23) | 64 (18) | 55 (13) | 59 (15) | 87 (31) |
| Mean maximum °F (°C) | 42.4 (5.8) | 43.0 (6.1) | 45.8 (7.7) | 49.3 (9.6) | 58.4 (14.7) | 64.6 (18.1) | 70.7 (21.5) | 70.4 (21.3) | 63.1 (17.3) | 55.0 (12.8) | 47.0 (8.3) | 44.1 (6.7) | 75.6 (24.2) |
| Mean daily maximum °F (°C) | 28.1 (−2.2) | 27.5 (−2.5) | 32.8 (0.4) | 37.8 (3.2) | 46.1 (7.8) | 52.7 (11.5) | 57.3 (14.1) | 58.0 (14.4) | 53.5 (11.9) | 42.9 (6.1) | 35.6 (2.0) | 30.7 (−0.7) | 41.9 (5.5) |
| Daily mean °F (°C) | 22.2 (−5.4) | 21.4 (−5.9) | 26.8 (−2.9) | 32.1 (0.1) | 40.4 (4.7) | 47.0 (8.3) | 51.9 (11.1) | 52.9 (11.6) | 48.2 (9.0) | 37.5 (3.1) | 30.0 (−1.1) | 25.2 (−3.8) | 36.3 (2.4) |
| Mean daily minimum °F (°C) | 16.3 (−8.7) | 15.3 (−9.3) | 20.8 (−6.2) | 26.4 (−3.1) | 34.7 (1.5) | 41.3 (5.2) | 46.4 (8.0) | 47.7 (8.7) | 42.7 (5.9) | 32.0 (0.0) | 24.5 (−4.2) | 19.7 (−6.8) | 30.7 (−0.7) |
| Mean minimum °F (°C) | −8.2 (−22.3) | −9.1 (−22.8) | −1.8 (−18.8) | 10.0 (−12.2) | 25.2 (−3.8) | 32.7 (0.4) | 39.0 (3.9) | 38.8 (3.8) | 31.2 (−0.4) | 14.9 (−9.5) | 4.7 (−15.2) | −1.9 (−18.8) | −14.6 (−25.9) |
| Record low °F (°C) | −25 (−32) | −22 (−30) | −26 (−32) | −6 (−21) | 11 (−12) | 25 (−4) | 32 (0) | 31 (−1) | 24 (−4) | −1 (−18) | −13 (−25) | −22 (−30) | −26 (−32) |
| Average precipitation inches (mm) | 0.89 (23) | 0.78 (20) | 1.03 (26) | 0.95 (24) | 1.01 (26) | 1.18 (30) | 1.84 (47) | 2.25 (57) | 2.44 (62) | 2.43 (62) | 1.66 (42) | 1.49 (38) | 17.95 (456) |
| Average snowfall inches (cm) | 14.2 (36) | 8.7 (22) | 6.7 (17) | 8.2 (21) | 2.9 (7.4) | 0.1 (0.25) | 0.0 (0.0) | 0.0 (0.0) | 0.0 (0.0) | 4.0 (10) | 7.9 (20) | 10.3 (26) | 63.0 (160) |
| Average precipitation days (≥ 0.01 inch) | 5.7 | 7.1 | 7.0 | 6.9 | 8.3 | 9.4 | 10.8 | 13.4 | 13.5 | 14.1 | 8.5 | 9.3 | 114.0 |
| Average snowy days (≥ 0.01 inch) | 5.9 | 5.6 | 4.6 | 4.7 | 1.6 | 0.1 | 0.0 | 0.0 | 0.0 | 2.1 | 4.2 | 6.1 | 34.9 |
Source 1: WRCC
Source 2: XMACIS (snowfall)

== Demographics ==
Historical population
| Census | Pop. | Note | %± |
|---|---|---|---|
| 1880 | 40 | | — |
| 1890 | 74 | | 85.0% |
| 1920 | 30 | | — |
| 1930 | 51 | | 70.0% |
| 1960 | 74 | | — |
| 1970 | 66 | | −10.8% |
| 1980 | 92 | | 39.4% |
| 1990 | 119 | | 29.3% |
| 2000 | 119 | | 0.0% |
| 2010 | 102 | | −14.3% |
| 2020 | 100 | | −2.0% |
U.S. Decennial Census

Port Heiden first appeared on the 1880 U.S. Census as the unincorporated Aleut village of "Mashikh." Some maps erroneously placed it at the latter settlement of Port Moller instead of at Port Heiden. In 1890, it returned as "Meshik." It next reported in 1920 as Port Heiden, and again in 1930. It did not appear again until 1960, but has appeared in every subsequent census. It was formally incorporated in 1972.

=== 2020 census ===
As of the 2020 census, Port Heiden had a population of 100. The median age was 30.0 years. 28.0% of residents were under the age of 18 and 5.0% of residents were 65 years of age or older. For every 100 females there were 108.3 males, and for every 100 females age 18 and over there were 100.0 males age 18 and over.

0.0% of residents lived in urban areas, while 100.0% lived in rural areas.

There were 40 households in Port Heiden, of which 42.5% had children under the age of 18 living in them. Of all households, 40.0% were married-couple households, 25.0% were households with a male householder and no spouse or partner present, and 22.5% were households with a female householder and no spouse or partner present. About 12.5% of all households were made up of individuals and 5.0% had someone living alone who was 65 years of age or older.

There were 56 housing units, of which 28.6% were vacant. The homeowner vacancy rate was 21.2% and the rental vacancy rate was 6.3%.

Racial composition as of the 2020 census
| Race | Number | Percent |
|---|---|---|
| White | 14 | 14.0% |
| Black or African American | 0 | 0.0% |
| American Indian and Alaska Native | 79 | 79.0% |
| Asian | 0 | 0.0% |
| Native Hawaiian and Other Pacific Islander | 0 | 0.0% |
| Some other race | 0 | 0.0% |
| Two or more races | 7 | 7.0% |
| Hispanic or Latino (of any race) | 1 | 1.0% |

=== 2000 census ===
As of the census of 2000, there were 119 people, 41 households, and 23 families residing in the city. The population density was 2.3 inhabitants per square mile (0.89/km^{2}). There were 56 housing units at an average density of 1.1 units per square mile (0.42 units/km^{2}). The racial makeup of the city was 19.33% White, 65.55% Native American, 2.52% from other races, and 12.61% from two or more races. 2.52% of the population were Hispanic or Latino of any race.

There were 41 households, out of which 39.0% had children under the age of 18 living with them, 46.3% were married couples living together, 2.4% had a female householder with no husband present, and 41.5% were non-families. 39.0% of all households were made up of individuals, and 7.3% had someone living alone who was 65 years of age or older. The average household size was 2.90 and the average family size was 3.79.

In the city, the age distribution of the population shows 39.5% under the age of 18, 5.0% from 18 to 24, 26.9% from 25 to 44, 22.7% from 45 to 64, and 5.9% who were 65 years of age or older. The median age was 33 years. For every 100 females, there were 105.2 males. For every 100 females age 18 and over, there were 125.0 males.

The median income for a household in the city was $31,875, and the median income for a family was $70,000. Males had a median income of $53,750 versus $21,667 for females. The per capita income for the city was $20,532. There were no families and 5.6% of the population living below the poverty line, including no under eighteens and 25.0% of those over 64.
