= Grant Aviation =

Airline based in Anchorage, Alaska

IATA	ICAO	Call sign
GV	GUN	HOOT
- Founded: 1971
- AOC #: ENHA618D
- Fleet size: 32
- Headquarters: Anchorage, Alaska
- Key people: Rob Kelley (CEO); Westward Partners (owner)
- Website: http://www.flygrant.com

Grant Aviation is a regional airline that serves the town of Kenai, the Yukon-Kuskokwim Delta, Bristol Bay, and the Aleutian Chain in Alaska, United States. The airline was formed in 1971 as Delta Air Services based in Emmonak. The current owners are Bruce McGlasson and Mark "Woody" Richardson, who purchased the airline in 2004. The company's slogan is "Fly Easy, Fly Grant."

== History ==
Grant Aviation was established in 1971 as Delta Air Services in Emmonak. The name was changed to Grant Aviation in 1993. Throughout the company's early years, before organizations like LifeMed Alaska, Grant provided medevac services for many of the villages of the Yukon Kuskokwim Delta. Villages would call Grant for medevac services and Grant would then transport patients to receive emergency medical care.

In October 1994, the village of Emmonak gave a Native owl mask to Grant Aviation in appreciation for numerous life-saving efforts in the villages of the Yukon River Delta. Later this mask became the company logo.

In 2022 the airline took over two charter airlines, Tanana Air Service and Shannon's Air Taxi.

== Operations ==
Grant Aviation serves over 100 communities in Alaska throughout the Yukon-Kuskokwim Delta, the Aleutians and Bristol Bay, with bases in Anchorage, Bethel, Cold Bay, Dillingham, Emmonak, Kenai, King Salmon and Unalaska/Dutch Harbor. It provides air ambulance services in the Yukon-Kuskokwim Delta Region through a contract with LifeMed Alaska.

== Fleet ==
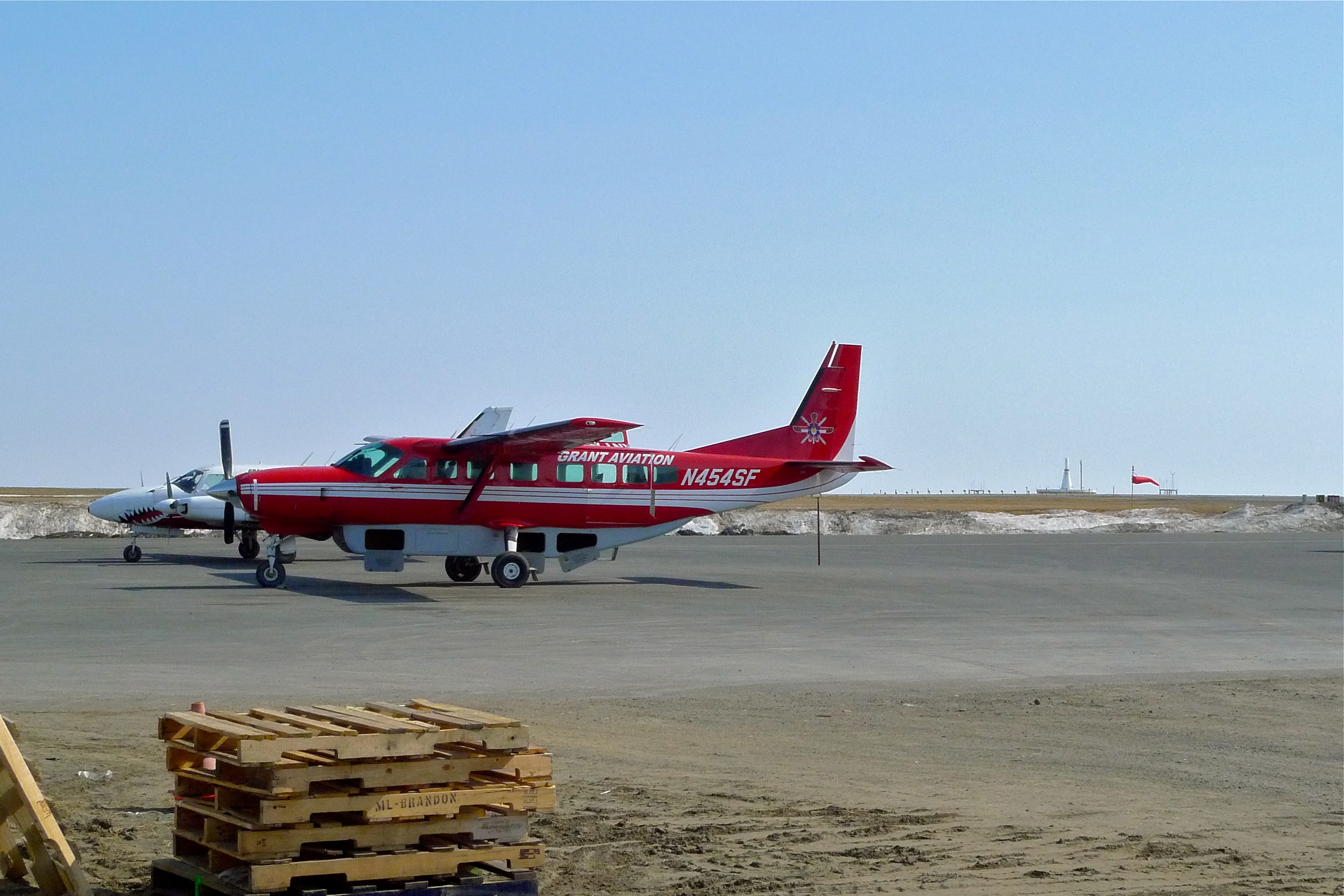
A Grant Aviation Cessna 208 at Bethel Airport

Grant Aviation flies a fleet of small propeller-driven airplanes, including:

Grant Aviation fleet
Aircraft	Number	Passengers
Beech BE-200	2	9
Cessna 207	12	6
Cessna 208	25	9
Piper PA-31 Navajo	4	9
GippsAero GA8 Airvan	7	7
Total	50	

On 7 July 2020, Grant Aviation acquired 10 Cessna 208 Caravans, and five Cessna 207 planes at Ravn Alaska's bankruptcy auction.

== Community awareness ==
Grant Aviation, along with Bering Air, Frontier Flying Service, Northern Air Cargo, PenAir, and Ryan Air, participates in the Flying Can service, which allows rural Alaskan communities to recycle aluminum cans and now number 1 PET bottles in cooperation with Alaskans for Litter Prevention and Recycling. Grant provides air ambulance services in the Yukon-Kuskokwim Delta Region through a contract with LifeMed Alaska. Grant Aviation also has a program to move shelter animals from the Kenai to Anchorage, where they have a better chance of getting adopted.

== Quyana Rewards ==
Grant Aviation offers a frequent-flyer program called Quyana Rewards. Members get credit for every paid segment on Grant Aviation. Members can redeem a free one-way ticket for every five segments and a round trip for ten segments, anywhere they fly. Rewards never expire.

== See also ==
- Air transportation in the United States
- List of airlines of the United States
- List of airports in the United States
- Transportation in the United States
