= List of places in Alaska (S) =

This list of cities, towns, unincorporated communities, counties, and other recognized places in the U.S. state of Alaska also includes information on the number and names of counties in which the place lies, and its lower and upper zip code bounds, if applicable.

Name of place	Number of counties	Principal county	Lower zip code	Upper zip code
Sagwon	1	North Slope Borough		
St. George	1	Aleutians West Census Area	99591	
St. George	1	Aleutians West Census Area	99660	
Saint George Island	1	Aleutians West Census Area	99660	
St. John Harbor	1	Wrangell-Petersburg Census Area		
Saint Marys	1	Kusilvak Census Area	99658	
Saint Mary's	1	Kusilvak Census Area	99658	
St. Mary's	1	Kusilvak Census Area	99658	
Saint Marys Airport	1	Kusilvak Census Area	99658	
St. Marys City School District	1	Kusilvak Census Area		
Saint Michael	1	Nome Census Area	99659	
St. Michael	1	Nome Census Area	99659	
Saint Paul	1	Aleutians West Census Area	99660	
St. Paul	1	Aleutians West Census Area	99660	
Saint Paul Island	1	Aleutians West Census Area	99660	
Saint Paul Island Airport	1	Aleutians West Census Area	99660	
Saint Terese	1	City and Borough of Juneau		
Salamatof	1	Kenai Peninsula Borough		
Salcha	1	Fairbanks North Star Borough	99714	
Salchaket	1	Fairbanks North Star Borough	99701	
Salmon	1	Yukon-Koyukuk Census Area		
Salmon Creek	1	City and Borough of Juneau	99801	
Salmon Lake	1	Nome Census Area		
Salt Chuck	1	Prince of Wales-Outer Census Area		
Sanak	1	Aleutians East Borough		
Sand Bay	1	Aleutians East Borough		
Sand Lake	1	Municipality of Anchorage	99522	
Sand Point	1	Aleutians East Borough	99661	
Sand Point Airport	1	Aleutians East Borough	99661	
San Juan	1	Kodiak Island Borough		
Saulich	1	Yukon-Koyukuk Census Area		
Savonoski	1	Bristol Bay Borough		
Savoonga	1	Nome Census Area	99769	
Saxman	1	Ketchikan Gateway Borough	99901	
Saxman East	1	Ketchikan Gateway Borough		
Scammon Bay	1	Kusilvak Census Area	99662	
Scow Bay	1	Wrangell-Petersburg Census Area	99833	
Sealaska	8	Haines Borough		
Sealaska	8	City and Borough of Juneau		
Sealaska	8	Ketchikan Gateway Borough		
Sealaska	8	Prince of Wales-Outer Census Area		
Sealaska	8	City and Borough of Sitka		
Sealaska	8	Skagway-Hoonah-Angoon Census Area		
Sealaska	8	Wrangell-Petersburg Census Area		
Sealaska	8	City and Borough of Yakutat		
Section House	1	Matanuska-Susitna Borough		
Selawik	1	Northwest Arctic Borough	99770	
Seldovia	1	Kenai Peninsula Borough	99663	
Seldovia Village	1	Kenai Peninsula Borough		
Serpentine Hot Springs	1	Nome Census Area		
Seversens	1	Dillingham Census Area		
Seward	1	Kenai Peninsula Borough	99664	
Seward-Hope	1	Kenai Peninsula Borough		
Shageluk	1	Yukon-Koyukuk Census Area	99665	
Shaktolik	1	Nome Census Area		
Shaktoolik	1	Nome Census Area	99771	
Sheldon Point	1	Kusilvak Census Area	99666	
Sheldon Point	1	Kusilvak Census Area		
Shemya	1	Aleutians East Borough		
Shemya Island	1	Aleutians East Borough		
Shemya Station/Air Force Station	1	Aleutians West Census Area	98736	
Sherman	1	Matanuska-Susitna Borough		
Sheshalik	1	Northwest Arctic Borough		
Shishmaref	1	Nome Census Area	99772	
Shoal Cove	1	Ketchikan Gateway Borough		
Shoreline Drive	1	Ketchikan Gateway Borough		
Shungnak	1	Northwest Arctic Borough	99773	
Shungnak Village	1	Northwest Arctic Borough		
Silver Springs	1	Valdez-Cordova Census Area		
Silvertip	1	Kenai Peninsula Borough	99631	
Sinuk	1	Nome Census Area		
Sitka	1	City and Borough of Sitka	99835	
Sitka	1	City and Borough of Sitka		
Sitka Airport	1	City and Borough of Sitka	99835	
Sitka City and Borough School District	1	City and Borough of Sitka		
Sitka National Historical Park	1	City and Borough of Sitka		
Situk	1	City and Borough of Yakutat		
Skagway	1	Municipality of Skagway Borough	99840	
Skagway City School District	1	Municipality of Skagway Borough		
Skwentna	1	Matanuska-Susitna Borough	99667	
Slana	1	Valdez-Cordova Census Area	99586	
Slaterville	1	Fairbanks North Star Borough		
Sleetmute	1	Bethel Census Area	99668	
Snug Harbor	1	Kenai Peninsula Borough	99572	
Soldatna	1	Kenai Peninsula Borough		
Soldotna	1	Kenai Peninsula Borough	99669	
Solomon	1	Nome Census Area		
Sourdough	1	Valdez-Cordova Census Area	99586	
South	1	Municipality of Anchorage	99502	
South Bierremark	1	Fairbanks North Star Borough		
Southeast Fairbanks	1	Southeast Fairbanks Census Area		
Southeast Islands Regional Educational Attendance Ar	2	Prince of Wales-Outer Census Area		
Southeast Islands Regional Educational Attendance Ar	2	Wrangell-Petersburg Census Area		
South Fairbanks	1	Fairbanks North Star Borough	99701	
South Naknek	1	Bristol Bay Borough	99670	
Southwest Region Regional Educational Attendance Are	1	Dillingham Census Area		
Sparrevohn Station	1	Bethel Census Area		
Spenard	1	Municipality of Anchorage	99503	
Squaw Harbor	1	Aleutians East Borough	99661	
Standard	1	Fairbanks North Star Borough		
Stebbins	1	Nome Census Area	99671	
Steese	1	Fairbanks North Star Borough	99710	
Sterling	1	Kenai Peninsula Borough	99672	
Sterling Landing	1	Yukon-Koyukuk Census Area		
Stevens	1	Yukon-Koyukuk Census Area		
Stevens Village	1	Yukon-Koyukuk Census Area	99774	
Stony River	1	Bethel Census Area	99557	
Strawberry Point	1	Skagway-Hoonah-Angoon Census Area		
Strelna	1	Valdez-Cordova Census Area		
Stuyahok	1	Kusilvak Census Area		
Sulatna Crossing	1	Yukon-Koyukuk Census Area		
Sullivan Camp	1	Nome Census Area		
Summit	1	Denali Borough	99729	
Sunnyside	1	Skagway-Hoonah-Angoon Census Area	99832	
Sunrise	1	Kenai Peninsula Borough		
Sunshine	1	Matanuska-Susitna Borough	99501	
Suntrana	1	Denali Borough	99743	
Susitna	1	Matanuska-Susitna Borough		
Sutton	1	Matanuska-Susitna Borough	99674	
Sutton-Alpine	1	Matanuska-Susitna Borough		
