= Elevation of Holy Cross Church =

Historic church in Alaska, United States

- U.S. National Register of Historic Places
- Alaska Heritage Resources Survey
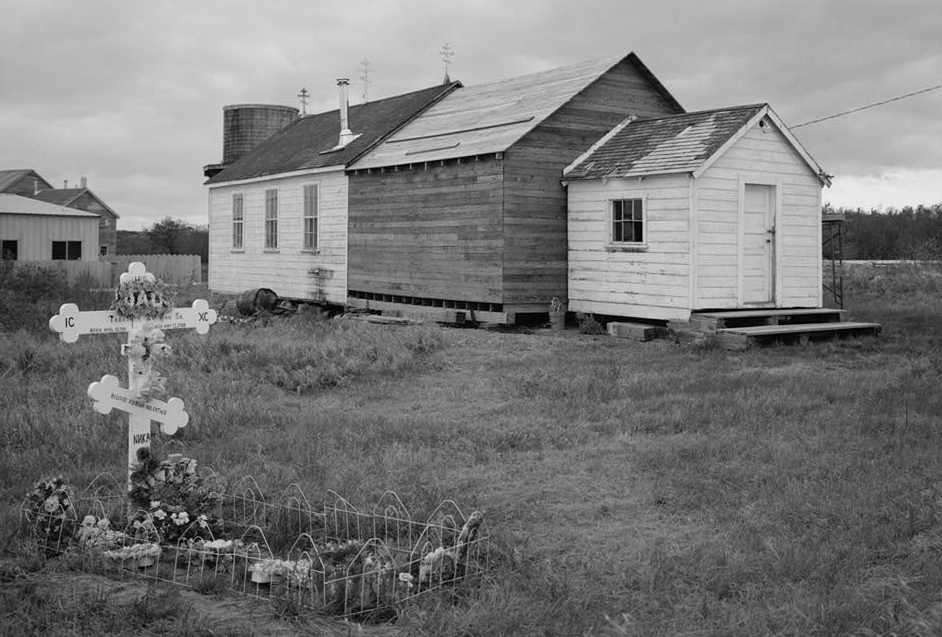

- Location within Alaska
- Location: In South Naknek, South Naknek, Alaska
- Coordinates: 58°42′56″N 157°0′7″W
- Area: less than one acre
- MPS: Russian Orthodox Church Buildings and Sites TR
- NRHP reference No.: 80000755
- AHRS No.: NAK-022

Significant dates
- Added to NRHP: June 6, 1980
- Designated AHRS: May 18, 1973

The Elevation of Holy Cross Church is a historic Russian Orthodox church in South Naknek, Alaska. It is a small building, roughly similar in size to the 1886 St. John the Baptist Chapel in Naknek, prior to its 1914 enlargement. It is now under Diocese of Alaska of the Orthodox Church in America.

Near the vestibule is a rack containing two medium-sized bells, which are rung from within the building by lanyards. The building resembles a schoolhouse, except for its modest exterior religious symbols.

The church was listed on the National Register of Historic Places in 1980.

== See also ==
- National Register of Historic Places listings in Bristol Bay Borough, Alaska
