= National Register of Historic Places listings in Bristol Bay Borough, Alaska =

Location of the Bristol Bay Borough in Alaska

This is a list of the National Register of Historic Places listings in Bristol Bay Borough, Alaska.

This is intended to be a complete list of the properties and districts on the National Register of Historic Places in Bristol Bay Borough, Alaska, United States. The locations of National Register properties and districts for which the latitude and longitude coordinates are included below, may be seen in an online map.

There are three properties listed on the National Register in the borough.

This National Park Service list is complete through NPS recent listings posted July 17, 2026.

== Current listings ==
	Name on the Register	Image	Date listed	Location	City or town	Description
1	APA's Diamond NN Cannery		August 20, 2021 (#100006826)	101 Cannery Rd. 58°42′41″N 157°02′07″W	South Naknek	
2	Elevation of Holy Cross Church	Elevation of Holy Cross Church	June 6, 1980 (#80000755)	In South Naknek; 58°42′56″N 157°00′07″W	South Naknek	
3	St. John the Baptist Chapel	St. John the Baptist Chapel	June 6, 1980 (#80000750)	In Naknek; 58°43′35″N 157°01′01″W	Naknek	

== See also ==
- List of National Historic Landmarks in Alaska
- National Register of Historic Places listings in Alaska
