= 2008 United States presidential election in Alaska =

- November 4, 2008
- Turnout: 66.03% ▼

Nominee	John McCain	Barack Obama
Party	Republican	Democratic
Home state	Arizona	Illinois
Running mate	Sarah Palin	Joe Biden
Electoral vote	3	0
Popular vote	193,841	123,594
Percentage	59.42%	37.89%

McCain
40–50%
50–60%
60–70%
70–80%
Obama
40–50%
50–60%
President before election
George W. Bush
Republican
Elected President
Barack Obama
Democratic

The 2008 United States presidential election in Alaska took place on November 4, 2008, as part of the nationwide presidential election held throughout all 50 states and the District of Columbia. Voters chose three electors, or representatives to the Electoral College, who voted for president and vice president.

Prior to the election, all leading news organizations considered this a state that Republican nominee John McCain would win, or otherwise considered as a safe red state. Democratic nominee Barack Obama did, however, perform better in 2008 than Democratic nominee John Kerry did in 2004. This is the first election since its statehood in which Alaska failed to support the same candidate as Virginia, and the only time in which it did so for Indiana.

Alaska was won by McCain by a 21.53% margin. The presence of the state's popular Governor, Sarah Palin, on the ticket as the Republican Party's vice presidential nominee appeared to help. The McCain–Palin ticket received just a slightly smaller percentage of Alaskan votes than did Bush–Cheney in 2004 despite the nation swinging Democratic by nearly 10 points. Polls from April until August indeed showed John McCain with a slim lead, with one poll taken in early August even showing Obama five points ahead. However, from when Sarah Palin was announced as McCain's running mate on August 29, polls showed John McCain consistently ahead. RealClearPolitics gave the state an average of 55.8% for McCain, compared to 41.3% for Obama.

In addition, McCain's 193,841 vote total is the most received by a presidential candidate in the state's history. As of the 2024 election, this is the last election in which Aleutians West Census Area and Yukon–Koyukuk Census Area voted for the Republican candidate.

== Primaries ==
- 2008 Alaska Democratic caucuses
- 2008 Alaska Republican caucuses

== Campaign ==
=== Predictions ===
There were 16 news organizations who made state-by-state predictions of the election. Here are their last predictions before election day:

Source	Ranking
D.C. Political Report	Likely R
Cook Political Report	Solid R
The Takeaway	Solid R
Electoral-vote.com	Solid R
The Washington Post	Solid R
Politico	Solid R
RealClearPolitics	Solid R
FiveThirtyEight	Solid R
CQ Politics	Solid R
The New York Times	Solid R
CNN	Safe R
NPR	Solid R
MSNBC	Solid R
Fox News	Likely R
Associated Press	Likely R
Rasmussen Reports	Safe R

=== Polling ===
Opinion polls consistently showed John McCain to be leading Barack Obama. From April until August they showed John McCain with a slim lead, with one poll taken in early August showing Obama five points ahead. However, from when Sarah Palin was announced as McCain's running mate on August 29, polls showed John McCain consistently ahead. RealClearPolitics gave the state an average of 55.8% for McCain, compared to 41.3% for Obama.

=== Fundraising ===
Barack Obama raised $977,438. John McCain raised $321,101.

=== Advertising and visits ===
Obama spent $134,686. McCain and his interest groups spent just $1,836. The Democratic ticket didn't visit the state. Alaskan native Sarah Palin campaigned just once in the state during the fall election.

== Analysis ==
At the time of the election, Alaska had a Republican Governor and Lieutenant Governor (Sarah Palin and Sean Parnell, respectively) and was represented in both the U.S. Senate and the U.S. House of Representatives solely by Republicans (U.S. Senator Ted Stevens, who was defeated for reelection in 2008 by the former Democratic Mayor of Anchorage Mark Begich, and U.S. Senator Lisa Murkowski, and U.S. Representative Don Young). At the time of the election, Republicans held a majority in the Alaska House of Representatives whereas a coalition of Democrats and moderate Republicans controlled the Alaska Senate. Furthermore, since becoming a state in 1959, Alaska has voted for the Republican nominee in every presidential election with the exception of 1964 when Alaska voted for president Lyndon B. Johnson in his 44-state landslide.

Early in the campaign, Obama actually bought some advertising in Alaska, apparently thinking that Libertarian Bob Barr could hold down McCain's numbers; Alaska has a history of supporting third-party candidates. Also, several polls in the early summer of 2008 showed the race within single digits (with one poll from Alaska pollster Hays Research showing Obama with a five-point lead).

== Results ==
Party	Candidate	Running mate	Votes	Percentage	Electoral votes
Republican	John McCain	Sarah Palin	193,841	59.42%	3
Democratic	Barack Obama	Joe Biden	123,594	37.89%	0
Independent	Ralph Nader	Matt Gonzalez	3,783	1.16%	0
Alaskan Independence	Chuck Baldwin	Darrell Castle	1,660	0.51%	0
Libertarian	Bob Barr	Wayne Allyn Root	1,589	0.49%	0
Independent	Write-in candidates		1,730	0.53%	0
Totals			327,341	100.00%	3
Voter turnout					66.03%

Boroughs and Census Areas that flipped from Republican to Democratic

- Bethel Census Area (largest city: Bethel)
- Kusilvak Census Area (largest city: Hooper Bay)
- Nome Census Area (largest city: Nome)
- Yakutat

=== By congressional district ===
Due to the state's low population, only one congressional district is allocated. This district, an at-large district because it covers the entire state, is thus equivalent to the statewide election results.

District	McCain	Obama	Representative
At-large	59.42%	37.89%	Don Young

== Electors ==
Technically the voters of Alaska cast their ballots for electors—representatives to the Electoral College. Alaska is allocated 3 electors because it has 1 congressional district and 2 senators. All candidates who appear on the ballot or qualify to receive write-in votes must submit a list of 3 electors, who pledge to vote for their candidate and their running mate. Whoever wins the majority of votes in the state is awarded all 3 electoral votes. Their chosen electors then vote for president and vice president. Although electors are pledged to their candidate and running mate, they are not obligated to vote for them. An elector who votes for someone other than their candidate is known as a faithless elector.

The electors of each state and the District of Columbia met on December 15, 2008, to cast their votes for president and vice president. The Electoral College itself never meets as one body. Instead the electors from each state and the District of Columbia met in their respective capitals.

The following were the members of the Electoral College from the state. All 3 were pledged to John McCain and Sarah Palin:

1. Roy Burkhart
2. Hope Nelson
3. Robert Brodie

== See also ==
- United States presidential elections in Alaska
