= George Jacko =

American politician

Member of the Alaska Senate
- In office 1993–1995

Member of the Alaska House of Representatives from the 26th district
- In office 1989–1993
- Preceded by: Adelheid Herrmann
- Succeeded by: Pat Carney

Personal details
- Born: December 14, 1959 (age 66) Alaska, U.S.
- Party: Democratic
- Children: 3
- Education: University of Alaska Anchorage (B.A.)

George Jacko Jr. (born December 14, 1959) is an American politician in the state of Alaska. He is from Pedro Bay, Alaska and is the first Alaska lawmaker to hail from the villages around Iliamna Lake. A Democrat, Jacko served in the Alaska House of Representatives from 1989 to 1993 and Alaska Senate from 1993 to 1995.

An Alaska Native (Denaʼina, Aleut, Yup’ik with Norwegian ancestry), Jacko grew up in a family of nine children, the son of George Jacko Sr. He attended the University of Alaska Anchorage where he earned a bachelor's degree in business administration, and worked as a commercial fisherman. Prior to his election to the Alaska House of Representatives, he worked as an aide to representative Adelheid Herrmann, whom he later defeated in a primary. In 1993, Jacko was censured by the Alaska State Senate after it was determined he broke state ethics laws for sexual harassment of a legislative page.
