= Della Keats =

Inupiaq Eskimo healer and midwife

- Putyuk
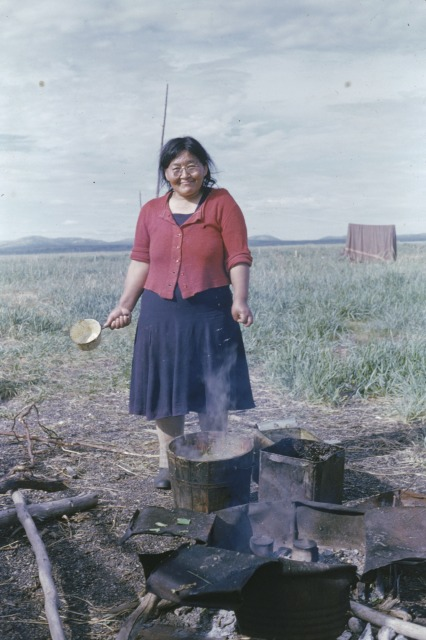
- Della Keats in 1952
- Born: January 15, 1907; Noatak River, Alaska
- Died: March 11, 1986 (aged 79); Kotzebue, Alaska
- Citizenship: Inupiaq

Della Keats (Putyuk) was an Inupiaq healer and midwife who grew up and came of age in the Northwest Arctic region of Alaska during the first half of the 20th century. Further inland from the coast, the region she inhabited is in the drainage areas of the Noatak, Kobuk, and Selawik Rivers as well as Sisualik. Her life in this region coincided with rapid changes as other peoples voyaged and then settled in alongside indigenous societies. Over the latter half of the 19th century, increased contact helped to spread disease; local people acquired firearms and alcohol; and some inhabitants abandoned their traditional territories by the turn of the century. Missions and schools were established in 1905-1915. During this time, families alternated between school and subsistence seasons. It was not until after the 1930s that Inupiat settled more permanently into villages. This was a time of rapid shifts, and Della Keats and her family lived a traditional subsistence lifestyle while gradually incorporating new materials and entering into trade with a cash economy. She was a tribal member of one of the ten communities in the Kotzebue region, Nautaaq (Noatak).

== Early life ==
Della Keats (Putyuk) was born January 15, 1907, along the upper Noatak River, in a place named Usulak, at a time before immigrant teachers arrived to the area. It was a treeless tundra, and her family lived in a sod house with ugruk skin windows and a door of brown bear hide. She began school at Point Hope at the age of six, learning her ABCs in English by writing with a flat rock on slates, not tablets. School was in session from October to April, starting in the morning 9-12 am, breaking for lunch, and continuing 1-3 pm each day. Her whole family resided in the village during the school season. Her father (Nunguqtuaq) was a handyman who was in charge of facilities, but he took time off for trapping and was a member of a whaling crew. Her mother was a housekeeper for the teacher. Young Della was one of six siblings, five surviving into adulthood. Her uncle was Mark Mitchell (Misigaq), her brother Marion (Aapaluk) died, her older brother was Gordon (Apayutnak), her oldest sister Isabella (Qaaqsi), her younger brother Clyde (Piniluq), and younger sister Maneta (Siniksaq).

Growing up in a time of rapid cultural transformations, Della Keats witnessed the use of traditional materials and tools, and at the same time observed the increasing use of new materials and tools acquired through trade and adapted to hunting, fishing, housing, and travel. She lived in a sod house as well as a log house and spent time in tents during hunting and fishing season. She wore skin clothes and cotton under clothes. Her mother sewed with a machine discarded by the school, and Della continued to sew with it in adult life. Her bedding was caribou skins but also grass mats on wooden beds in the log house. Her father made a stove and pipe out of kerosene cans. The use of seal gut and sinew was being replaced by twine. Twine was used for fishing and ptarmigan nets, but Della knew about willow bark nets from her mother. Her father hunted with a rifle, but he knew and taught her brother to make and to hunt with a bow and arrow. They made kayaks (qayaq) and skin boats (qayagiaq) out of animals and wood. Paddles were made of caribou shoulder and a willow handle. Seal oil lamps were being replaced by kerosene lamps. And as she grew older, she began to use an inboard motor in a boat.

Adapted to seasonal cycles, the family ate from the land and waters of the region: caribou, grayling, trout, sheefish, whitefish, ptarmigan, marmot, muskrat, ducks, beluga. Della Keats has an early memory of having a pet eagle. The family ate fresh and dried fish, and they fed some to their dogs, including meat that had been spoiled and then dried. Nothing was wasted. They traded for flour, molasses, cheese, beans, and mustard. Her mother learned to bake bread. After the school season ended in April, the family would travel by dog team to the coast to hunt seal, camping along Rabbit Creek in tents, with other people from the region. By this time of the year, families were running out of dried meat and seal oil. They hunted ptarmigan along the way. Whoever was successful would share meat with others, equitably, though there were no firm rules on how it would be distributed. They also hunted muskrat and ducks in April and May. They traveled to Kotzebue in July/August to trade seal skins for oil and ammunition and returned to the Noatak River in late August/September to fish for salmon with cotton twine seine nets. In late August, they cut wood for sleds and boat frames, which they would sell or trade for supplies. They spent the time before school started in October sewing winter clothes, mukluks and waders.

Della Keats reported in her autobiography that she started making mukluks and mittens by age 8 and was making her father's mukluks by age 11. She also helped him make nets. She made ugruk bottoms (soles for footwear) with her own teeth by age 11, and was beginning to sell and trade some items in Kotzebue.

One early memory she has is of an incident that involved her family saving a surveyor crew along the Kelly River. The U.S. Geological Survey Field Party in the summer and spring of 1925 had not been able to hunt successfully, so Della Keats' family shared their food and helped the party to survive.

== Adult Life and Healing Work ==
Della Keats' autobiography skips from her early years, 1907-1918, to her adult life, 1930s-1940s. According to the editors of her autobiography, she had married a reindeer herder when she was 16 but was the sole parent and provider of three children in her 20s—Perry, Priscilla, and Sylvester—who ranged in age from 3-9 in 1943. She worked as the Postmaster at Noatak Village to support her children. She also made a living by selling things she sewed and by actively participating in subsistence harvesting with her larger family group. Her parents would travel up and down the Noatak River, and she eventually moved in to help them in 1945.

Della Keats exhibited an interest in anatomy, the circulatory system, and midwifery from a young age. One report writes that she learned human anatomy and circulation from a textbook when she was in seventh and eighth grade. The anatomical nomenclature of the Inupiat language suggests that members of the culture shared a similar interest. Father Oleksa's brief portrait claims that she started healing people when she was 16, although her autobiography says that she started practicing medicine in her mid 20s. Residents of the Kotzebue Sound region recognized her as a general medical practitioner, and she served both white and Inupiat patients and delivered lectures and health education across cultures. She was in private practice in the Kotzebue Sound region through the late 1960s, but she began to travel more in the 1970s, with the support of Native corporations, to share her knowledge more widely.

What seems to be well known and emphasized is that Della Keats used her hands to heal. The healing hands of the Inupiat people like Della Keats was not unique but characteristic of other Alaska Native groups. Massage and cold and heat helped with diagnosis and treatment of a range of ailments—liver, stomach, constipation, sprains, dislocations, fractures—and could also be used to turn babies in utero or move an umbilical cord Due to a history of disease epidemics, the introduction of refined foods, and a lingering distrust from experimental procedures, it was a slow process to establish mutual respect and trust. Practitioners like Della Keats found a way to integrate traditional Alaska Native medicine (magico-religious) with Western medicine (empirico-rational) in complementary fashion. Her personality and character have been credited for her success in blending Inupiat tribal healing and Western medicine for the benefit and respect of all.

== Legacy ==
A member of the University of Alaska Nursing Faculty, Tina DeLapp, has written about the contributions of Della Keats in an article titled, "American Eskimos: The Yup’ik and Inupiat."

=== Awards and honors ===
- In 1983, Della Keats was awarded an Honorary Doctorate of Humane Letters in Health Sciences, by the University of Alaska Anchorage.
- In 2009, Della Keats was inducted into the Alaska Women's Hall of Fame. According to the award biography, as written by Gabriela Riquelme, Keats "used three tools to heal her patients: her hands, her head, and her heart. Her hands were her main tools. Her sense of touch was highly developed and just by touching Keats could diagnose troubles and pains. She would prescribe home remedies made from herbs and plants from the tundra, or perform massages or exercises on her patients. She would give advice and suggest certain practical activities for her patients and their families to do to stay healthy. Keats believed the more people were involved with their own bodies, the higher the chances were they could heal themselves and take control of their own health. Keats encouraged her patients to take an interest in healing themselves through a positive and personal approach."
- Della Keats has an entry in the National Library of Medicine, which is sponsored by the National Institute of Health.

=== Maniilaq Health Center ===
The Maniilaq Health Center (the hospital based in Kotzebue that services the Northwest Arctic region) relies on the example of Della and other tribal healers to service the people of the region. While most of the doctors who work there undergo formal medical education, they still have a tribal doctor program where traditional healers can treat people and provide apprenticeships.

=== Della Keats Health Sciences Curriculum ===
Both a summer bridge program and a summer research program are named in honor of Della Keats for her long-standing commitment to the health of Native peoples and all people in Alaska.

- Della Keats Health Sciences Summer Program
  - Part of the UAA WWAMI School of Medical Education, the summer program is a bridge program that serves high school students from rural areas who are planning to pursue medical and health care careers in college.
- Della Keats Summer Research Program
  - The summer research program is a continuation from the previous summer. In a six-week program, students are paired with a mentor and guided through an internship in which they design, carry out, and present on health-related research.

=== Della Keats Healing Hands Award ===
The Della Keats Healing Hands Award is bestowed upon a tribal healer or health care provider and announced at the annual Alaska Federation of Natives that convenes in October each year.

- 2019: Dorcus Rock
- 2017: Ethel Lund
- 2015: Dr. Nora Nagaruk Aiyuu
- 1999: Betty Geraldine Nelson

== Additional Resources ==
- "Hands, Head, and Health", Story of Della Keats- Produced by the Norton Sound Health Corp.
- Hsu, L. Annotated Bibliography of Unpublished Literature On Alaska Native Traditional Healing.
- Keats, D. (1985). Della Keats: Eskimo healer (Video). Kotzebue, Alaska: Manillnaq.
- Kramer, M. R. (2006). Traditional Healing Among Alaska Natives. Candidacy Essay. Saybrook Graduate School and Research Center, San Francisco, CA.
- Lucier, C. V., VanStone, J. W., & Keats, D. (1971). Medical practices and human anatomical knowledge among the Noatak Eskimos. Ethnology, 10(3), 251–264.
- Reimer, C. S. (1999). Counseling the Inupiat Eskimo (No. 36). Greenwood Publishing Group.
- Turner, E. (2016). Anthropologists and Healers: Radical Empiricists. Social Analysis, 60(1), 129–139.
- Roderick, L. (1983). Profiles in Change: Della Keats. http://www.alaskool.org/projects/women/profiles/acsw1983/D_Keats.htm
- Mauer, Richard (March 13, 1986). "Death Stills Healing Hands Tribal Doctor's Skill". Anchorage Daily News (AK). p. B1.
