= Kvichak =

Kvichak may refer to several places in the U.S. state of Alaska:

- Kvichak River
- Kvichak Bay
- Levelock, Alaska, formerly Kivichakh
