= APA's Diamond NN Cannery =

- U.S. National Register of Historic Places
- Location within Alaska
- Location: 101 Cannery Rd. Naknek, Alaska
- Coordinates: 58.7115°N 157.0352°W
- NRHP reference No.: 100006826
- Added to NRHP: August 21, 2021

The Alaska Packer's Association Diamond NN Cannery located at the mouth of the Naknek River (Bristol Bay) in Naknek, Alaska operated between 1890 and 2015. In 2020, the cannery site was formally nominated for inclusion on the National Register of Historic Places and in 2021 the nomination was forwarded by the Alaska Historical Commission for national listing consideration. It was listed in August 2021.

An exhibit based on the history of the cannery called "Mug Up: The Language of Work" opened at the Alaska State Museum in Juneau in February 2022.
