= Levelock, Alaska =

Levelock, Alaska Liivlek Kivichakh
- Census-designated place
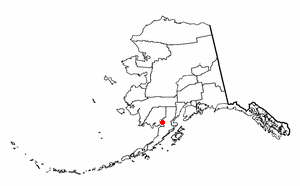
- Location of Levelock, Alaska
- Coordinates: 59°6′37″N 156°51′31″W
- Country: United States
- State: Alaska
- Borough: Lake and Peninsula

Government
  - Borough mayor: Glen Alsworth, Sr.
  - State senator: Lyman Hoffman (D)
  - State rep.: Bryce Edgmon (I)

Area
  - Total: 16.73 sq mi (43.32 km^{2})
  - Land: 16.73 sq mi (43.32 km^{2})
  - Water: 0 sq mi (0.00 km^{2})
- Elevation: 50 ft (15 m)

Population (2020)
  - Total: 69
  - Density: 4.1/sq mi (1.59/km^{2})
- Time zone: UTC-9 (Alaska (AKST))
  - Summer (DST): UTC-8 (AKDT)
- ZIP code: 99625
- Area code: 907
- FIPS code: 02-43810

Levelock (Central Yupik: Liivlek) is a census-designated place (CDP) along the Kvichak River in Lake and Peninsula Borough, Alaska, United States. It was known by the indigenous name of Kivichakh, a variant of Kvichak. At the 2020 census the population was 69, same amount as in 2010.

== Geography ==
Levelock is located at 59°6′37″N 156°51′31″W (59.110141, -156.858684). It sits on the west bank of the Kvichak River, 18 miles (29 km) north of its mouth at Kvichak Bay and 47 miles (76 km) by river southwest (downstream) from Igiugig at the outlet of Iliamna Lake.

According to the United States Census Bureau, the Levelock CDP has a total area of 12.1 square miles (31.3 km^{2}), all of it land.

== Demographics ==
Historical population
Census	Pop.	Note	%±
1890	37		—
1950	76		—
1960	88		15.8%
1970	74		−15.9%
1980	79		6.8%
1990	105		32.9%
2000	122		16.2%
2010	69		−43.4%
2020	69		0.0%
U.S. Decennial Census

Levelock first appeared on the 1890 U.S. Census as the native village of "Kivichakh." It did not appear again until 1950, as Levelock. It was made a census-designated place (CDP) in 1980.

As of the census of 2000, there were 122 people, 45 households, and 25 families residing in the CDP. The population density was 8.4 inhabitants per square mile (3.2/km^{2}). There were 50 housing units at an average density of 3.4 per square mile (1.3/km^{2}). The racial makeup of the CDP was 4.92% White, 89.34% Native American, and 5.74% from two or more races. 2.46% of the population were Hispanic or Latino of any race.

There were 45 households, out of which 37.8% had children under the age of 18 living with them, 33.3% were married couples living together, 11.1% had a female householder with no husband present, and 44.4% were non-families. 42.2% of all households were made up of individuals, and 11.1% had someone living alone who was 65 years of age or older. The average household size was 2.71 and the average family size was 3.96.

In the CDP, the population was spread out, with 40.2% under the age of 18, 8.2% from 18 to 24, 22.1% from 25 to 44, 22.1% from 45 to 64, and 7.4% who were 65 years of age or older. The median age was 28 years. For every 100 females, there were 144.0 males. For every 100 females age 18 and over, there were 128.1 males.

The median income for a household in the CDP was $18,750, and the median income for a family was $31,667. Males had a median income of $30,417 versus $30,417 for females. The per capita income for the CDP was $12,199. There were 16.7% of families and 24.5% of the population living below the poverty line, including 29.7% of under eighteens and 50.0% of those over 64.

The Tribal Village of Levelock has three key economic drivers: tourism (sport fishing and lodges), a commercial seafood plant scheduled to open 2018-19 and tender services along the major river systems of southwest Alaska. In 2017, the village provided increased transparency of these and other projects.

== Notable residents ==
- Adelheid Herrmann, Alaskan state legislator (1983–89), researcher
