= Naknek Lake =

Lake in the state of Alaska, United States

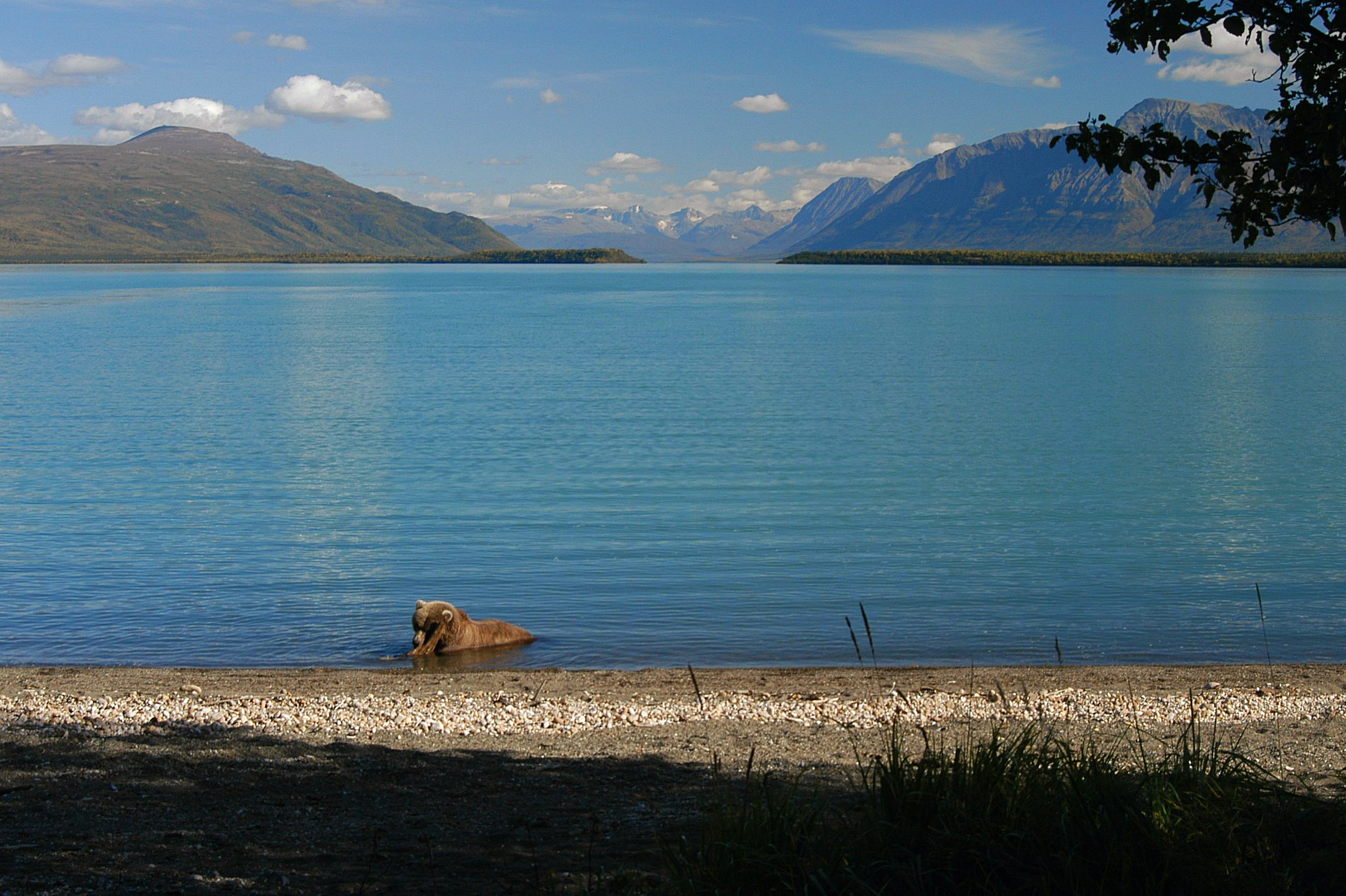
- A grizzly bear in Naknek Lake, with Iliuk Moraine and Iliuk Arm Naknek Lake in the background

- Location within Alaska Location within North America
- Location: Lake and Peninsula Borough and Bristol Bay Borough, Alaska
- Coordinates: 58°38′11″N 155°56′27″W
- Primary outflows: Naknek River
- Basin countries: United States
- Max. length: 64 km (40 mi)
- Max. width: 13 km (8.1 mi)
- Surface area: 150,000 acres (61,000 ha)

Naknek Lake is a lake in southern Alaska, near the base of the Alaska Peninsula. Located in Katmai National Park and Preserve, the lake is 40 miles (64 km) long and three to eight miles (4.8 to 12.9 km) wide, the largest lake in the park. The lake drains west into Bristol Bay through the Naknek River. The elevation of the lake has lowered over the past 5,000 years as it has cut through a glacial moraine, separating Naknek Lake and Brooks Lake and creating Brooks Falls about 3,500 years ago.

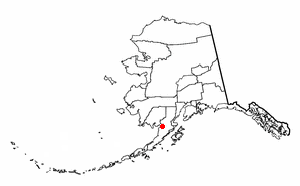
Location of King Salmon, Alaska

The earliest Russian explorer reported the lake's name as Naknek, but a later one said its name was "Akulogak". Ivan Petrof named the lake Lake Walker, for Francis Amasa Walker, Superintendent of the 1880 United States census.

The lake is famous for its sport fishing, supporting one of the largest king salmon fisheries in southwestern Alaska, though the king salmon are greatly outnumbered by sockeye salmon as well as pink and chum salmon. Large rainbow trout are also common around the lake, along with northern pike, lake trout and Arctic char. Brooks Camp is located on the lake's shore where the Brooks River enters the lake over rapids.

== Animals ==
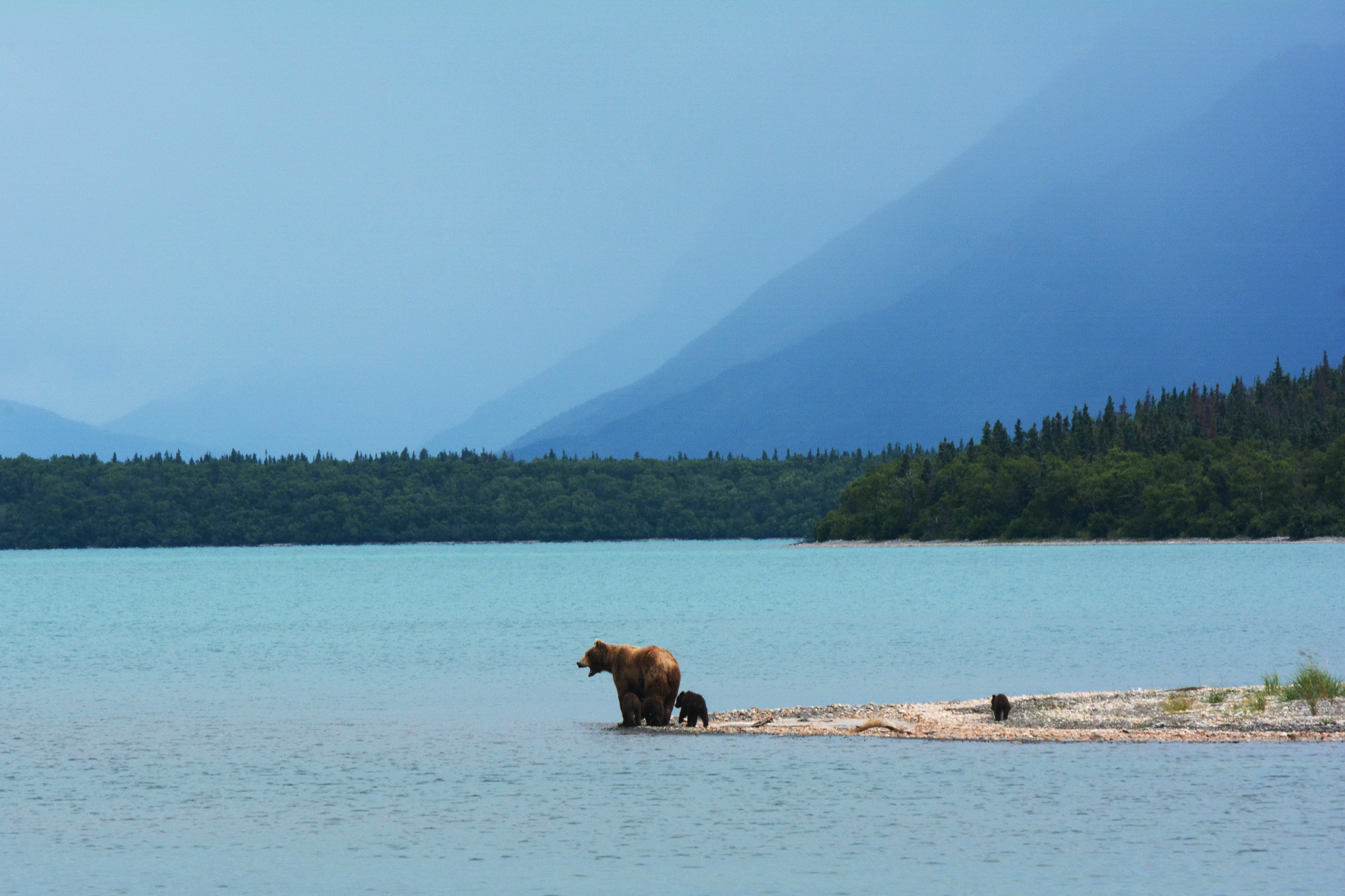
A mother grizzly bear with four cubs on the edge of Naknek Lake

Naknek Lake harbors a wide variety of life, typical of the Alaska Peninsula. Typically observed around the lake are Alaska moose, wolves, and occasionally wolverines. However, the lake is most famous for sockeye salmon and grizzly bears. The bears are often seen wandering around the lake or wading into it to catch fish, but they are found in the greatest abundance at Brooks Camp. Bears are seen frequently at Brooks Falls, catching salmon there; they are the main attraction to the lake and Brooks Falls and Camp.
