= Naknek River =

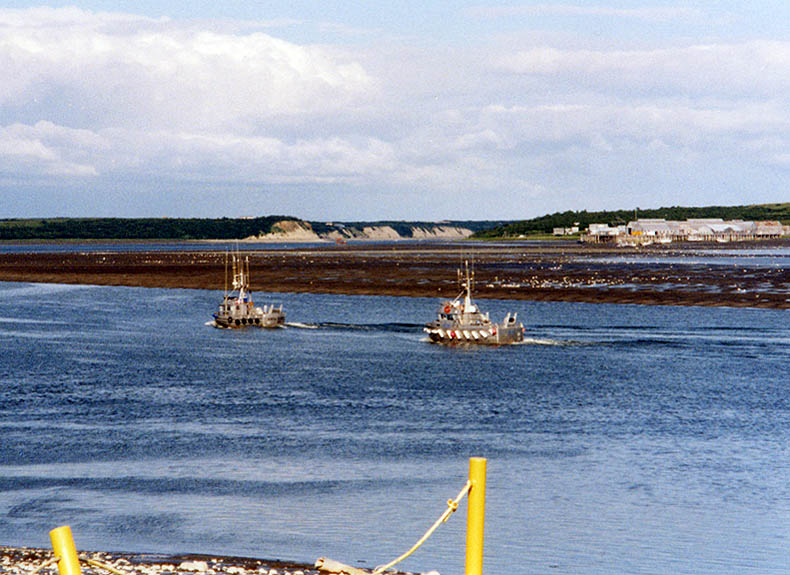
- Salmon boats on the Naknek River

- Location of the mouth of the Naknek River in Alaska

Location
- Country: United States
- State: Alaska
- Borough: Bristol Bay

Physical characteristics
- Source: Naknek Lake
  - location: Katmai National Park and Preserve
  - coordinates: 58°41′04″N 156°25′25″W
  - elevation: 33 ft (10 m)
- Mouth: Kvichak Bay
  - location: 2 miles (3 km) west of Naknek, Alaska Peninsula
  - coordinates: 58°43′07″N 157°03′56″W
  - elevation: 0 ft (0 m)
- Length: 35 mi (56 km)

Naknek River is a stream, 35 miles (56 km) long, in the Bristol Bay Borough of the U.S. state of Alaska. It flows west from Naknek Lake to empty into Kvichak Bay, an arm of Bristol Bay. The river and lake are both known for their sockeye and other salmon.

The village of King Salmon is near the head of the river; Naknek and South Naknek lie at its mouth, on the north and south banks respectively. The head lies within Katmai National Park and Preserve.

== See also ==
- List of rivers of Alaska
