= St. John the Baptist Chapel =

Historic church in Alaska, United States

- U.S. National Register of Historic Places
- Alaska Heritage Resources Survey
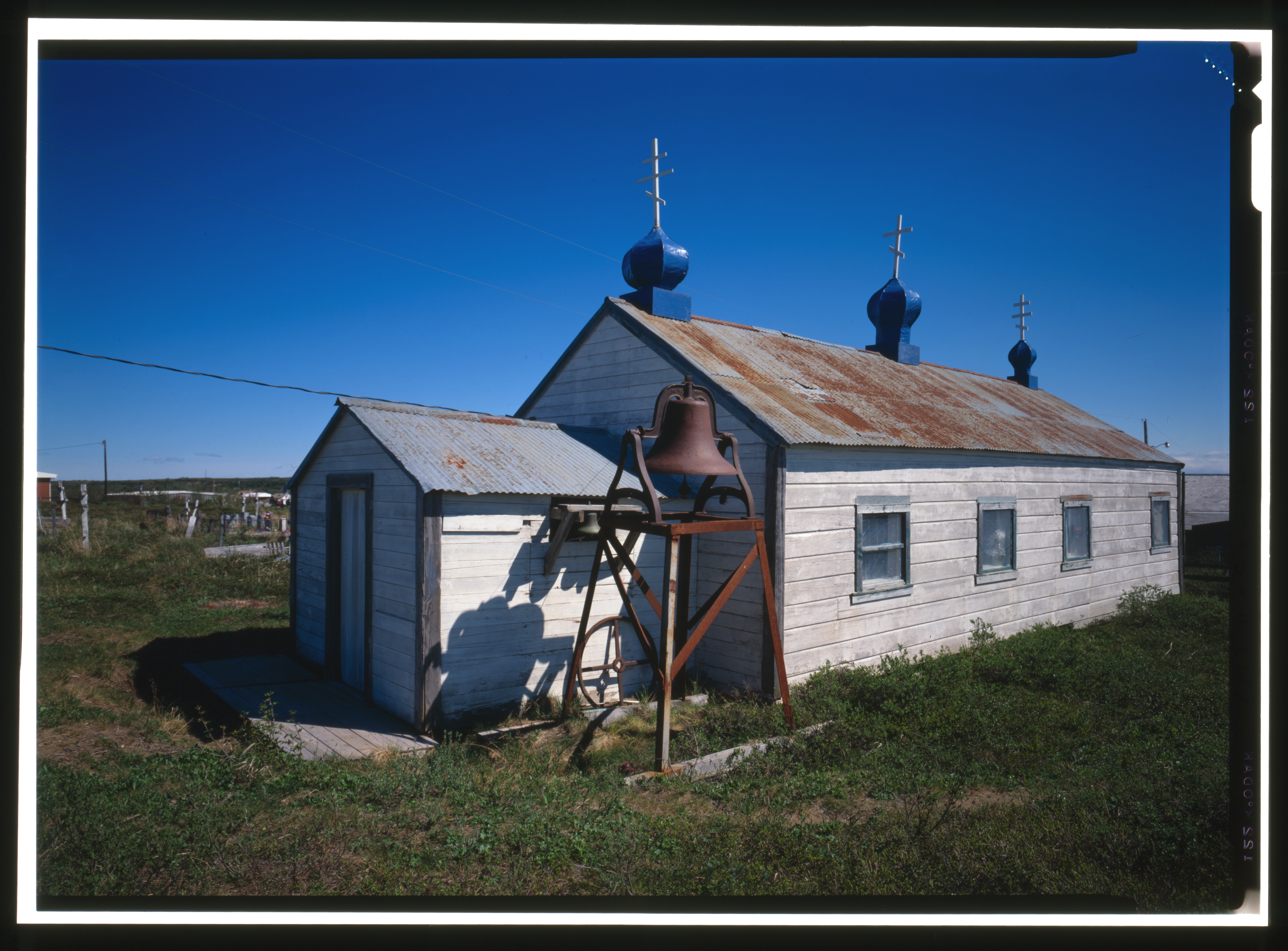

- Location within Alaska
- Location: Naknek, Alaska
- Coordinates: 58°43′35″N 157°1′1″W
- Area: less than one acre
- Built: 1914
- MPS: Russian Orthodox Church Buildings and Sites TR
- NRHP reference No.: 80000750
- AHRS No.: NAK-023

Significant dates
- Added to NRHP: June 6, 1980
- Designated AHRS: May 18, 1973

The St. John the Baptist Chapel is a historic Russian Orthodox chapel in Naknek, Alaska, United States. It is traditionally said to have been built in 1886 and enlarged in 1914. It is a simple single story wood-frame building. It consists of a single chamber, measuring 10'3" wide and 30'3" long, which houses the nave and altar, and a small vestibule. Analysis of the construction indicates that the vestibule and a portion of the nave were constructed after the original construction date. The gable roof is topped by a centrally-placed Russian Orthodox cross, and there is a bell mounted on a metal framework outside the vestibule.

The chapel was listed on the National Register of Historic Places in 1980.

== See also ==
- National Register of Historic Places listings in Bristol Bay Borough, Alaska
