= Adelheid Herrmann =

Native American politician

Member of the Alaska House of Representatives from the 26th district
- In office 1983–1989

Personal details
- Born: April 15, 1953 (age 73) Levelock, Alaska, U.S.
- Party: Democratic
- Education: Antioch University; University of La Verne (D.Ed.)
- Occupation: Politician, educator

Adelheid Herrmann (born April 15, 1953) is a Dena'ina Athabaskan researcher and politician. She is a shareholder in the Bristol Bay Native Corporation, one of the 13 Alaska Native corporations.

== Early life and education ==
Herrmann is the granddaughter of Charles Herrmann (1893–1959) and Anna Gartelman Herrmann. Charles Herrmann was born in Kiel, Germany, migrated to San Francisco in 1910, and found employment in the Bristol Bay area of Alaska. Anna Gartelman was Aleut woman from Nushagak.

Adelheid was born in Levelock, Alaska on April 15, 1953, and grew up in Naknek, where she attended Bristol Bay High School (1966-1970). She earned a degree in public policy, fisheries, and Native American studies (1999) from Antioch University and a D.Ed. in organizational leadership with an emphasis in fisheries and oceans (2013) from the University of La Verne in California. Adelheid also attended the University of Alaska Fairbanks and Alaska Methodist University in Anchorage. Her expert area is social science and climate change. The goal of her work is to help citizens in rural areas react to climate change, with the aspects of resilience, mitigation, and adaptation to whatever climate change throws their way.

== Career ==
From 1983 to 1989 Herrmann was a member of the Alaska House of Representatives, representing Naknek for the Democratic Party in the 13th, 14th and 15th legislatures. Herrmann has also held a variety of other positions in fields including the seafood industry.

As of February 2025 she is a post-doctoral research assistant at the International Arctic Research Center (IARC) at the University of Alaska Fairbanks, where her areas of expertise are climate adaptation and social science; she is working on a project "with the goal of building the capacity of rural communities to respond and adapt to climate change." She has worked with the Alaska Center for Climate Assessment & Preparedness (ACCAP) as a co-investigator, researching and contributing information about the effects of climate change for Native Alaskans. Part of this research has meant creating resources such as schematics and infographics to clarify the workings of Indigenous Alaskan tribes and communities for political agencies or academics working on fundings for or research on Native areas. The graphs primarily focus on visualizing two things: the internal stressors of tribal members and external entities they collaborate with to adapt to climate change. Her June 2024 materials were released online and over 1,000 people accessed the research in the first two weeks they were available. She is also a member of the Council of Elders of Alaska Pacific University, a body whose mission is "to support, strengthen, and ensure the development, integration, and prioritization of encompassing Alaska Native knowledge, language, values, perspectives, history, and concerns in education at Alaska Pacific University". As a member of the Council of Elders, Herrmann aims to implement the "tribal college concept" which places Native Alaskans themselves as the head of their educational path. Herrmann is a member of the Polar Research Board (PRB) of the National Academies which provides guidance on issues in cold regions of the world like the Arctic and Antarctic. In April 2025, Herrman delivered the keynote address at the 17th Western Alaska Interdisciplinary Science Conference in Naknek, Alaska, discussing her experiences in Bristol Bay region and her postdoc work.

== See also ==
- List of Native American politicians
- Native American women in politics
