= 2008 Alaska Democratic presidential caucuses =

- February 5, 2008

Candidate	Barack Obama	Hillary Clinton
Home state	Illinois	New York
Delegate count	9	4
Popular vote	6,674	2,194
Percentage	75.16%	24.71%
- Primary results by state house district Obama: 50–60% 60–70% 70–80% 80–90%

The 2008 Alaska Democratic presidential caucuses took place Super Tuesday, February 5, 2008. This was the first time that Democrats in Alaska participated in Super Tuesday, and the large turnout forced at least one caucusing site to delay closing its doors far beyond the 6 p.m. deadline. The state had a total of 13 delegates at stake. Barack Obama won the Alaska Democratic Caucuses and secured 9 delegates to the Democratic National Convention while Hillary Clinton took 4 delegates. However, the caucus was non-binding, and Alaska's Democratic State Convention in May awarded Obama 10 pledged delegates.

== Process ==
The Alaska Democratic Caucuses were open to all Alaska voters. Non-Democrats and unregistered voters could register or switch party affiliation at the meeting. At the caucus, voters "fanned out" to groups of supporters of their candidate. Then delegates to the state convention on May 24, 2008, were selected from these preference groups. At the district caucuses, candidates required a minimum support threshold of 15 percent to win delegates to the state convention. The same threshold applied at the state convention; candidates needed a support threshold of 15 percent to receive delegates at the Democratic National Convention.

However, the district caucus results were not binding on the state convention delegates. Therefore, although Obama only won 9 delegate votes in the caucuses, at the state convention he secured 10. Unlike many caucus states, the actual number of votes in the Alaska caucuses was disclosed. Many states only tabulate state delegates or state delegate equivalents.

The state convention officially allocated the 13 delegates to the national convention. In addition, the state convention chose five superdelegates to attend the national convention. Superdelegates officially were not pledged to any candidate. However, all of Alaska's superdelegates endorsed either Clinton or Obama.

== Results ==
Alaska Democratic presidential caucus results – 2008
Party	Candidate	Votes	Percentage	State Delegates	Delegates
Democratic	Barack Obama	6,674	75.16%	306	9
Democratic	Hillary Clinton	2,194	24.71%	104	4
Democratic	Uncommitted	12	0.14%	1	0
Totals		8,880	100.00%	411	13
Voter turnout		%		—	

=== State Convention ===
Alaska Democratic Presidential State Convention – May 24, 2008
Party	Candidate	Votes	Percentage	Delegates
Democratic	Barack Obama	272	77.50%	10
Democratic	Hillary Clinton	79	22.50%	3
Democratic	Uncommitted	0	0.00%	0
Totals		351	100.00%	13
Voter turnout		%		—

Superdelegates

Superdelegate	Selected by	Endorsement
John Davies	Democratic National Convention	Barack Obama
Patti Higgins	Democratic National Convention	Hillary Clinton
Blake Johnson	Democratic National Convention	Barack Obama
Cindy Spanyers	Democratic National Convention	Barack Obama
Tony Knowles	State Convention Delegates	Barack Obama

== Analysis ==
Barack Obama scored a major victory in the Democratic Caucuses, winning by more than a three-to-one margin over Hillary Clinton.

== See also ==
- 2008 Alaska Republican presidential caucuses
