= 2008 Alaska Republican presidential caucuses =

- February 5, 2008
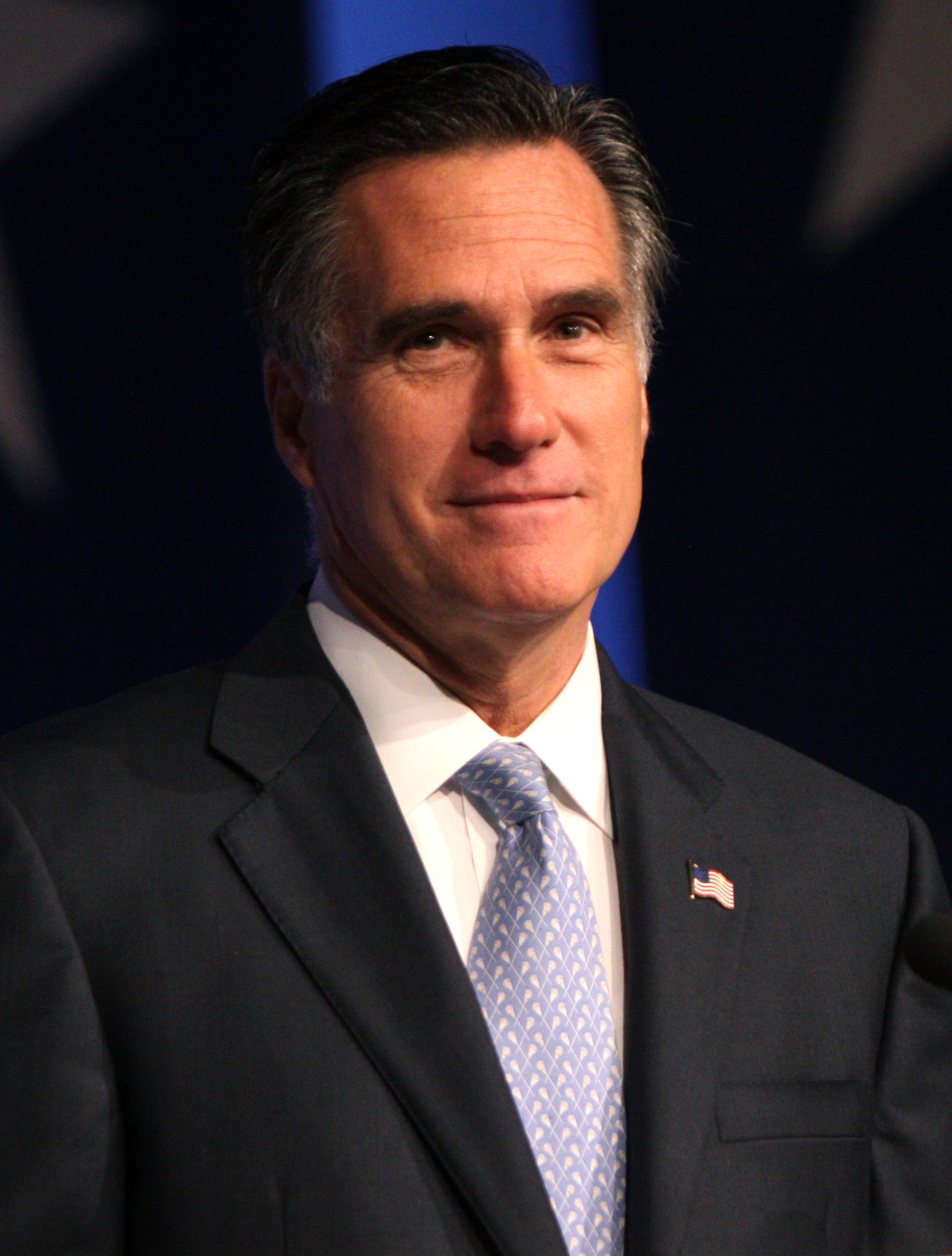

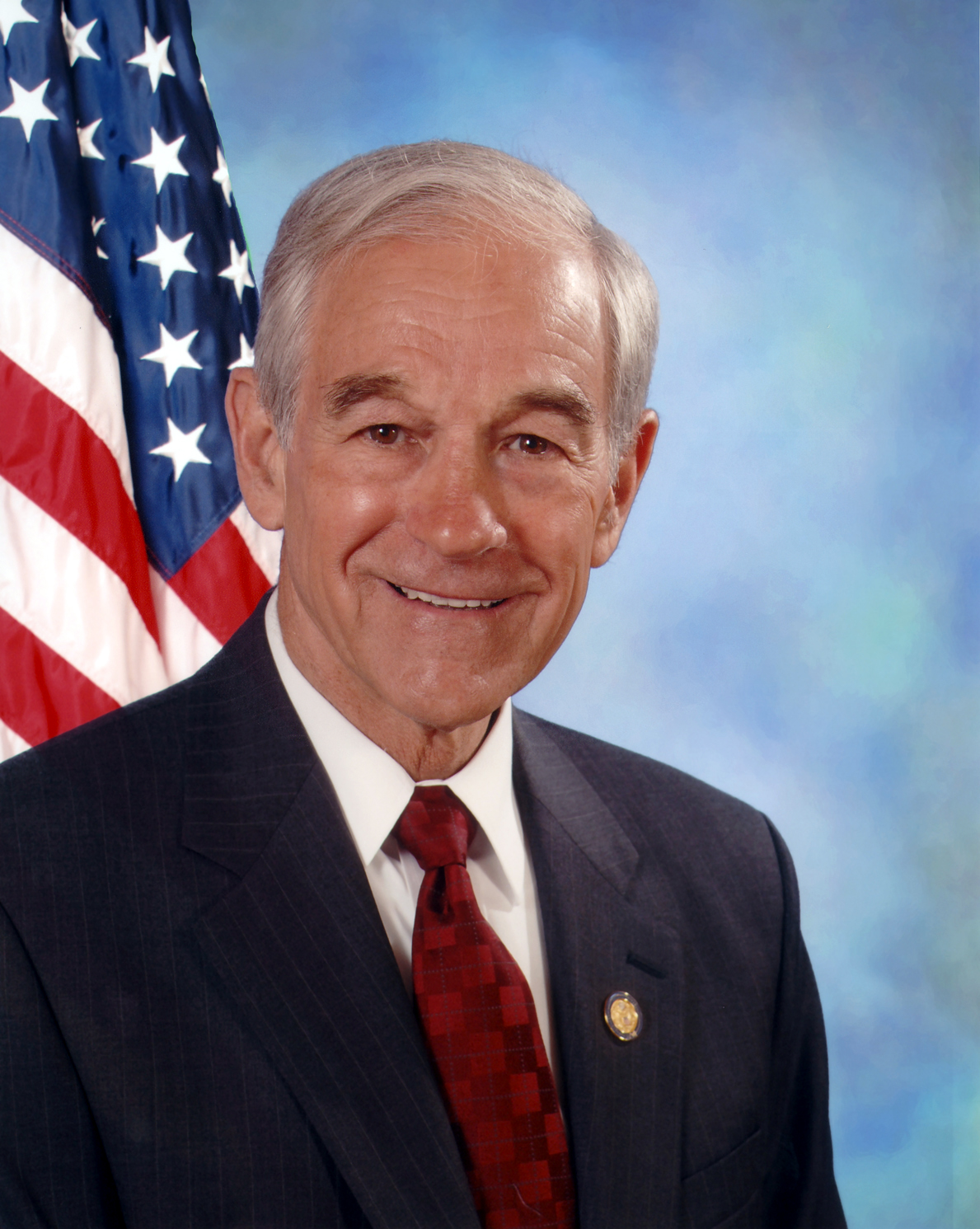

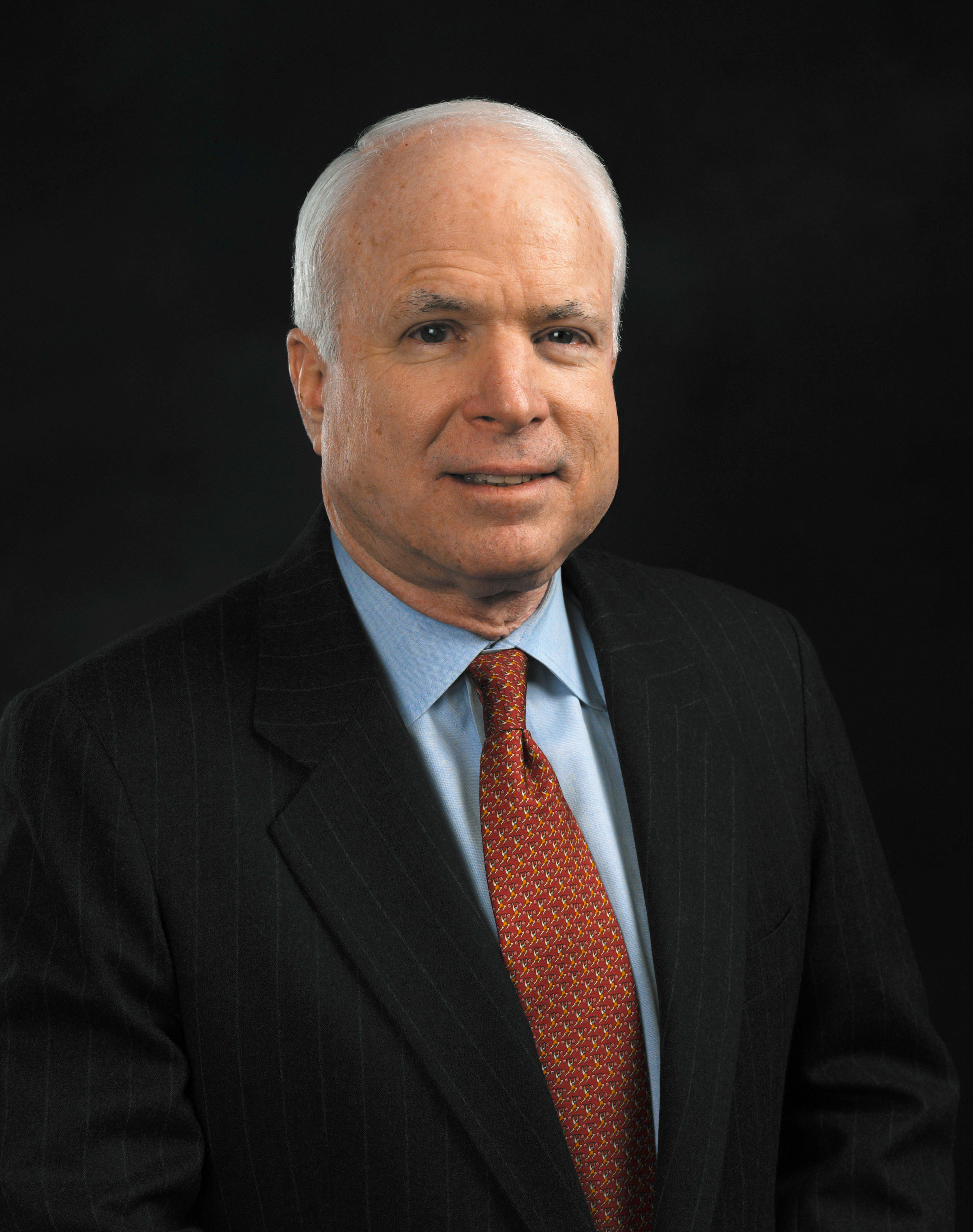
Candidate	Mitt Romney	Mike Huckabee
Party	Republican	Republican
Home state	Massachusetts	Arkansas
Delegate count	12	6
Popular vote	5,988	2,996
Percentage	35.87%	21.86%
Candidate	Ron Paul	John McCain
Party	Republican	Republican
Home state	Texas	Arizona
Delegate count	5	3
Popular vote	2,363	2,132
Percentage	17.24%	15.56%

The 2008 Alaska Republican presidential caucuses were held on February 5, 2008, and has a total of 26 delegates at stake. Mitt Romney won the state, and, as the winner in Alaska's congressional district, was awarded all of that district's delegates. All results are from the presidential preference poll held at the caucuses. Actual delegates were selected on February 5 or 9 at district conventions held throughout the state, and finally at a statewide convention held between March 13–15 in Anchorage.

== Candidates ==
- Mike Huckabee
- John McCain
- Ron Paul
- Mitt Romney

Candidates Rudy Giuliani, Duncan L. Hunter and Fred Thompson dropped out of the presidential race before the primary.

== Results ==
100% of precincts reporting
Candidate	Votes	Percentage	Delegates
Mitt Romney	5,988	35.87%	12
Mike Huckabee	2,996	21.86%	6
Ron Paul	2,363	17.24%	5
John McCain	2,132	15.56%	3
Unpledged	224	1.63%	0
Total	13,703	100%	26

== See also ==
- 2008 Alaska Democratic presidential caucuses
- 2008 Republican Party presidential primaries
