= Bristol Bay Borough, Alaska =

Borough in Alaska, United States

- Borough
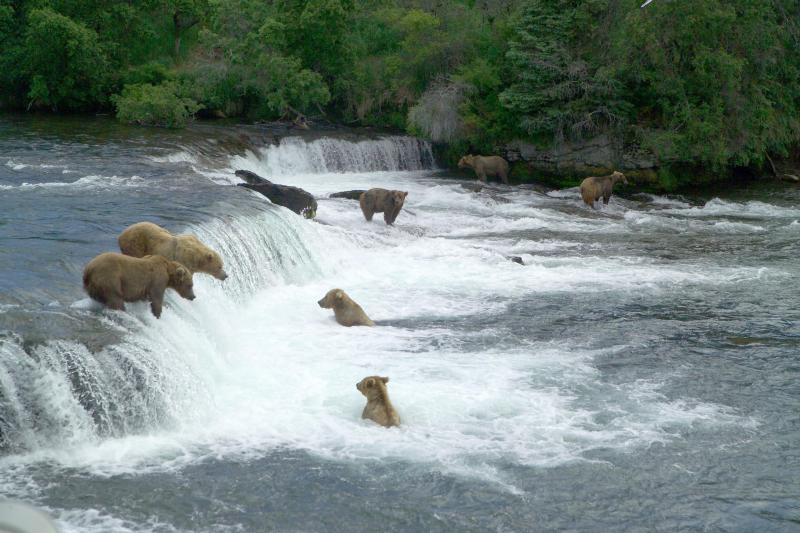
- Brooks Falls at Katmai National Park and Preserve.

- Seal

- Location within the U.S. state of Alaska
- Coordinates: 58°45′00″N 156°50′00″W
- Country: United States
- State: Alaska
- Incorporated: October 2, 1962
- Named for: Bristol Bay
- Seat: Naknek
- Largest community: Naknek

Government
  - Mayor: David R. Lax

Area
  - Total: 888 sq mi (2,300 km^{2})
  - Land: 504 sq mi (1,310 km^{2})
  - Water: 384 sq mi (990 km^{2}) 43.2%

Population (2020)
  - Total: 844
  - Estimate (2025): 847 ▲
  - Density: 1.67/sq mi (0.647/km^{2})
- Time zone: UTC−9 (Alaska)
  - Summer (DST): UTC−8 (ADT)
- Congressional district: At-large
- Website: www.bristolbayboroughak.us

Bristol Bay Borough is a borough of the U.S. state of Alaska on Bristol Bay. As of the 2020 census the borough population was 844, down from 997 in 2010, the second-least populated borough in Alaska. The borough seat is Naknek. There are no incorporated settlements.

Bristol Bay was officially incorporated in 1962 and became the state's first borough. It is also among the smallest, consisting of little more than the rectangle of land around Naknek on the coast and King Salmon (which, uniquely, serves as the borough seat for the neighboring Lake and Peninsula Borough) inland.

== Geography ==
The borough has a total area of 888 square miles (2,300 km^{2}), of which 504 square miles (1,310 km^{2}) is land and 384 square miles (990 km^{2}) (43.2%) is water.

=== Adjacent boroughs and census areas ===
- Lake and Peninsula Borough, Alaska (east, north and south)
- Dillingham Census Area, Alaska (west)

=== National protected area ===
- Katmai National Park and Preserve (part)
  - Katmai Wilderness (part)

== Demographics ==
Historical population
Census	Pop.	Note	%±
1970	1,147		—
1980	1,094		−4.6%
1990	1,410		28.9%
2000	1,258		−10.8%
2010	997		−20.7%
2020	844		−15.3%
2025 (est.)	847	▲	0.4%
U.S. Decennial Census; 1900-1990 1990-2000; 2010-2020

=== 2020 census ===
Bristol Bay Borough, Alaska – Racial and ethnic composition Note: the US Census treats Hispanic/Latino as an ethnic category. This table excludes Latinos from the racial categories and assigns them to a separate category. Hispanics/Latinos may be of any race.
Race / Ethnicity (NH = Non-Hispanic)	Pop 1980	Pop 1990	Pop 2000	Pop 2010	Pop 2020	% 1980	% 1990	% 2000	% 2010	% 2020
White alone (NH)	653	881	656	476	357	59.69%	62.48%	52.15%	47.74%	42.30%
Black or African American alone (NH)	46	38	7	0	6	4.20%	2.70%	0.56%	0.00%	0.71%
Native American or Alaska Native alone (NH)	360	446	550	330	296	32.91%	31.63%	43.72%	33.10%	35.07%
Asian alone (NH)	5	12	3	8	5	0.46%	0.85%	0.24%	0.80%	0.59%
Native Hawaiian or Pacific Islander alone (NH)	x	x	6	3	3	x	x	0.48%	0.30%	0.36%
Other race alone (NH)	0	0	0	0	2	0.00%	0.00%	0.00%	0.00%	0.24%
Mixed race or Multiracial (NH)	x	x	29	156	130	x	x	2.31%	15.65%	15.40%
Hispanic or Latino (any race)	30	33	7	24	45	2.74%	2.34%	0.56%	2.41%	5.33%
Total	1,094	1,410	1,258	997	844	100.00%	100.00%	100.00%	100.00%	100.00%

As of the 2020 census, the county had a population of 844. The median age was 41.4 years. 22.0% of residents were under the age of 18, and 16.1% of residents were 65 years of age or older. For every 100 females there were 108.9 males, and for every 100 females age 18 and over there were 110.9 males age 18 and over.

The racial makeup of the county was 43.8% White, 0.7% Black or African American, 36.1% American Indian and Alaska Native, 0.6% Asian, 0.4% Native Hawaiian and Pacific Islander, 1.4% from some other race, and 16.9% from two or more races. Hispanic or Latino residents of any race comprised 5.3% of the population.

0.0% of residents lived in urban areas, while 100.0% lived in rural areas.

There were 357 households in the county, of which 29.4% had children under the age of 18 living with them, and 19.3% had a female householder with no spouse or partner present. About 31.7% of all households were made up of individuals, and 9.5% had someone living alone who was 65 years of age or older.

There were 857 housing units, of which 58.3% were vacant. Among occupied housing units, 57.4% were owner-occupied, and 42.6% were renter-occupied. The homeowner vacancy rate was 1.9%, and the rental vacancy rate was 13.4%.

=== 2000 census ===
At the 2000 census, there were 1,258 people, 490 households, and 300 families residing in the borough. The population density was 2 people per square mile (0.77 people/km^{2}). There were 979 housing units at an average density of 2 per square mile (0.77/km^{2}). The racial makeup of the borough was 52.54% White, 0.56% Black or African American, 43.72% Native American, 0.24% Asian, 0.48% Pacific Islander, 0.08% from other races, and 2.38% from two or more races. 0.56% were Hispanic or Latino of any race.

Of the 490 households, 38.20% had children under the age of 18 living with them, 49.20% were married couples living together, 6.10% had a female householder with no husband present, and 38.60% were non-families. 31.20% of households were one person, and 2.90% were one person aged 65 or older. The average household size was 2.57, and the average family size was 3.33.

The age distribution was 31.30% under the age of 18, 5.90% from 18 to 24, 34.80% from 25 to 44, 24.20% from 45 to 64, and 3.80% 65 or older. The median age was 36 years. For every 100 females, there were 119.50 males. For every 100 females age 18 and over, there were 125.60 males.

== Communities ==
=== Census-designated places ===
- King Salmon (borough seat of neighboring Lake and Peninsula Borough)
- Naknek (Borough seat)
- South Naknek

=== Census Subareas ===
- Bristol Bay

== Politics ==
Bristol Bay Borough only voted for the Democratic candidate twice, in 1960 and 1964, and has sided with Republicans ever since.

United States presidential election results for Bristol Bay Borough, Alaska
Year	Republican		Democratic		Third party(ies)	
Year	No.	%	No.	%	No.	%
1960	83	29.64%	197	70.36%	0	0.00%
1964	54	21.77%	194	78.23%	0	0.00%
1968	127	44.10%	122	42.36%	39	13.54%
1972	167	57.00%	112	38.23%	14	4.78%
1976	169	50.60%	147	44.01%	18	5.39%
1980	209	52.91%	119	30.13%	67	16.96%
1984	359	70.81%	129	25.44%	19	3.75%
1988	309	61.31%	175	34.72%	20	3.97%
1992	290	40.85%	196	27.61%	224	31.55%
1996	268	46.45%	183	31.72%	126	21.84%
2000	383	54.79%	202	28.90%	114	16.31%
2004	285	68.18%	122	29.19%	11	2.63%
2008	366	69.85%	142	27.10%	16	3.05%
2012	251	58.92%	147	34.51%	28	6.57%
2016	274	59.05%	103	22.20%	87	18.75%
2020	304	60.08%	193	38.14%	9	1.78%
2024	254	61.65%	139	33.74%	19	4.61%

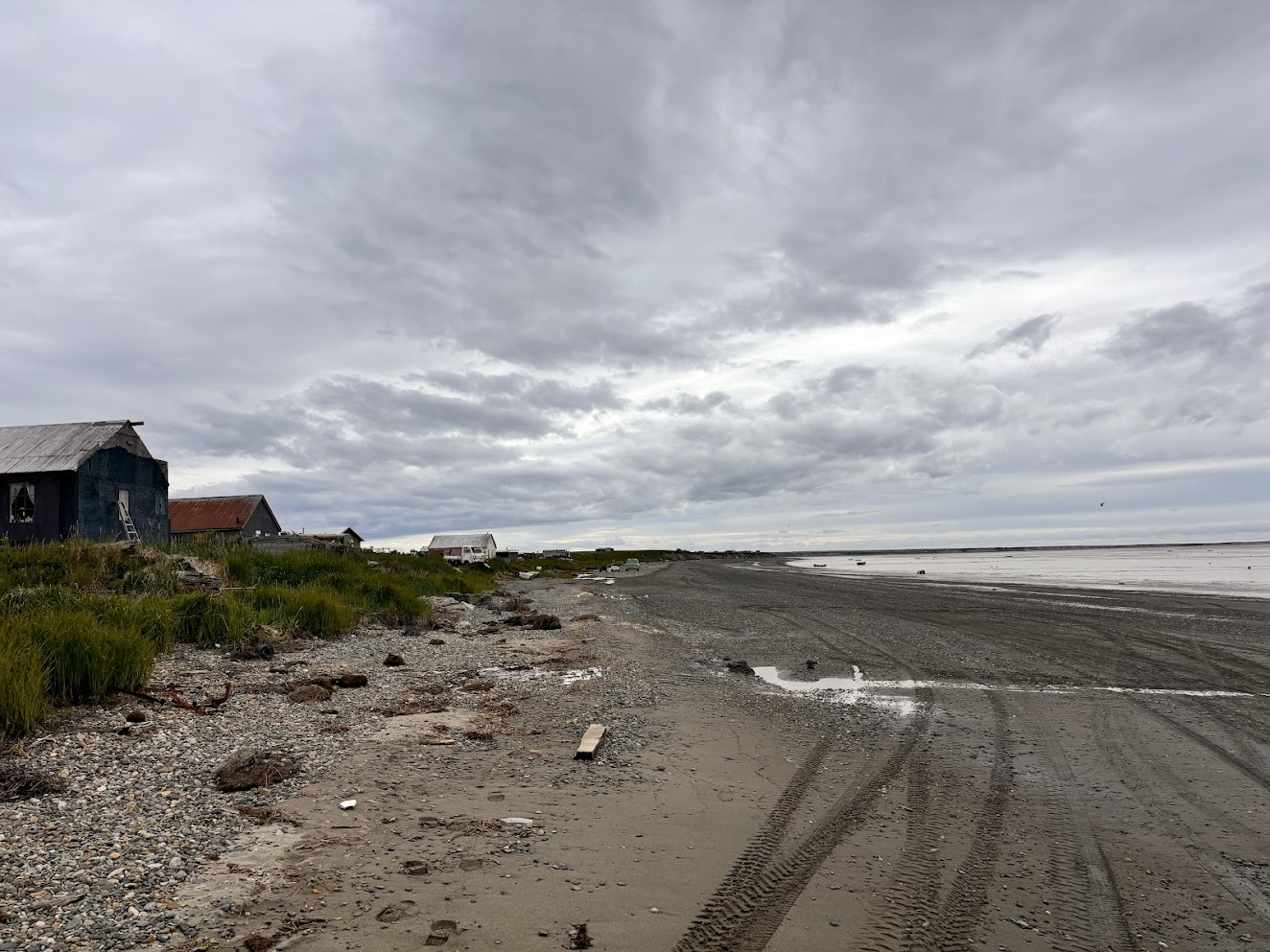
The Bering Sea and Kvichak Bay, at Pederson Point

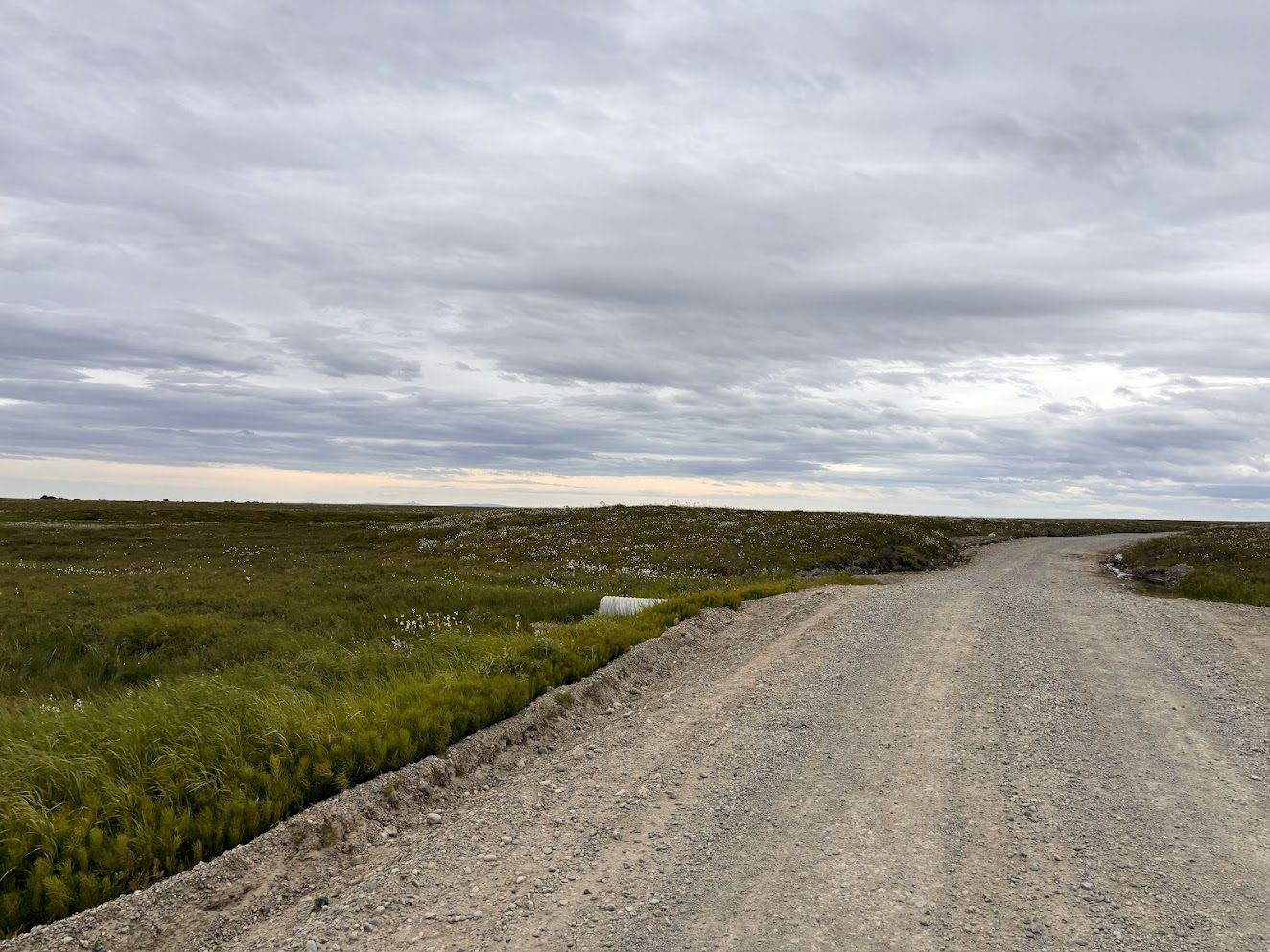
Tundra outside Naknek

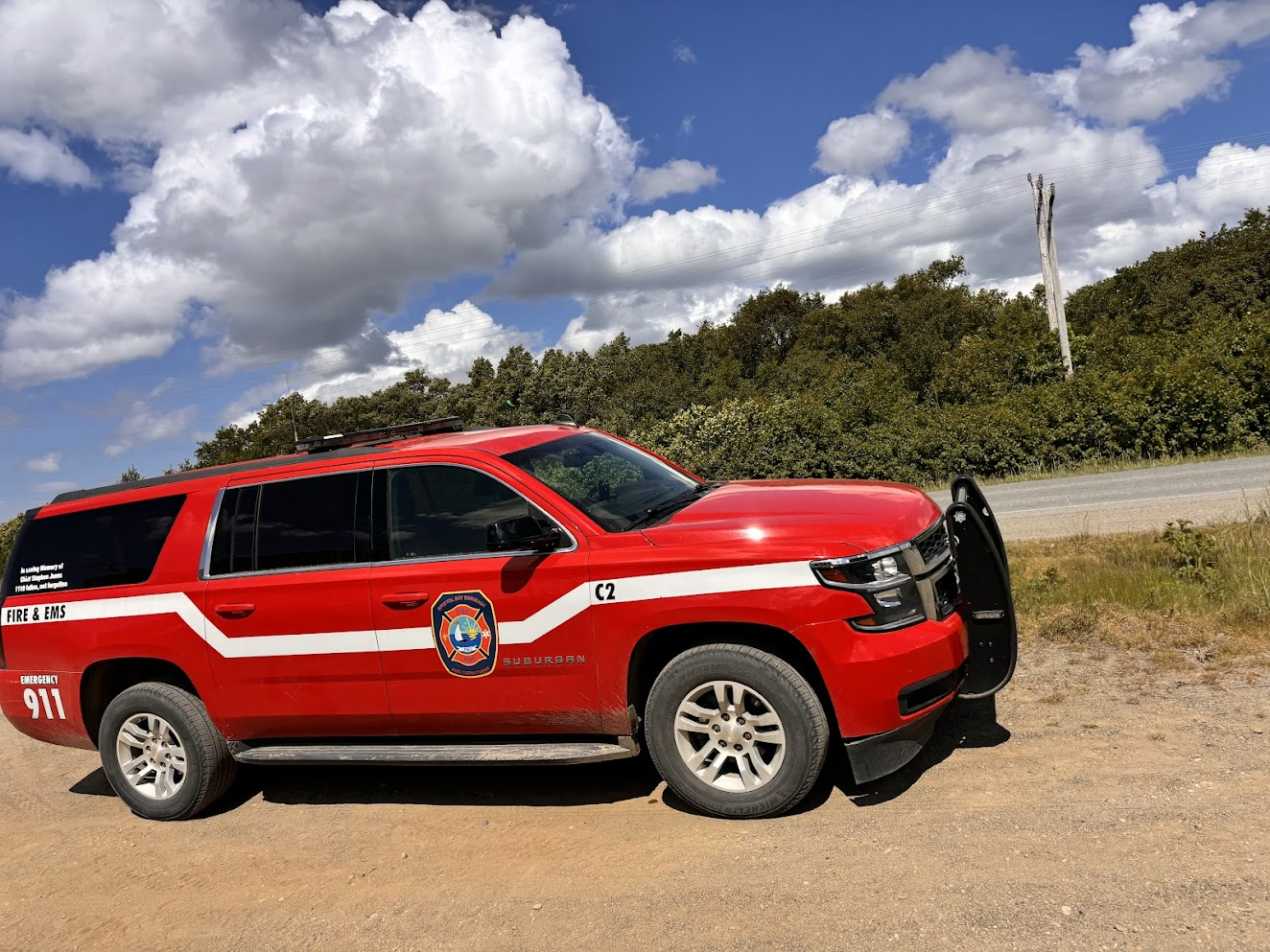
Bristol Bay Borough Fire and EMS

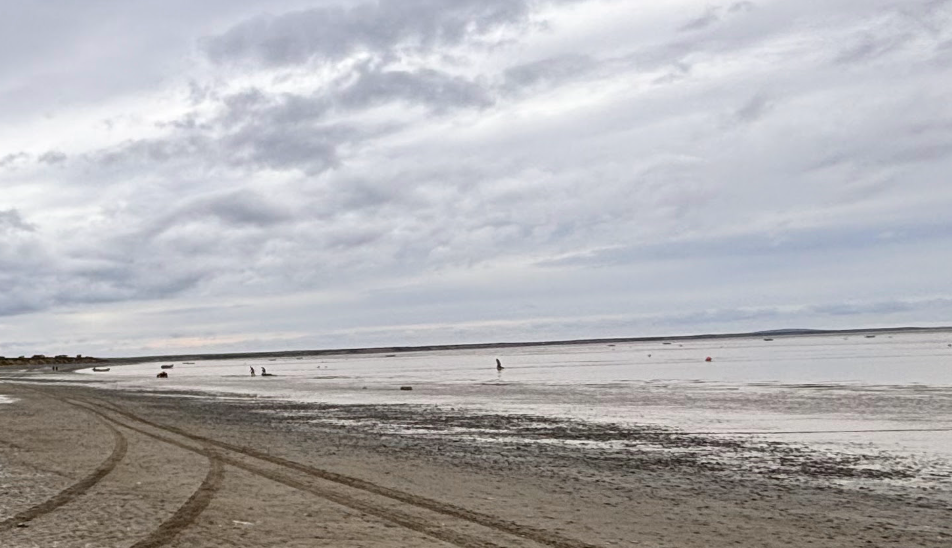
Kvichak Bay at low tide, with fishermen in the distance. Fishing is a major industry in the Bristol Bay Borough.

== See also ==
- List of airports in the Bristol Bay Borough
- National Register of Historic Places listings in Bristol Bay Borough, Alaska
