= Sisualik, Alaska =

Sisualik
- Unincorporated community
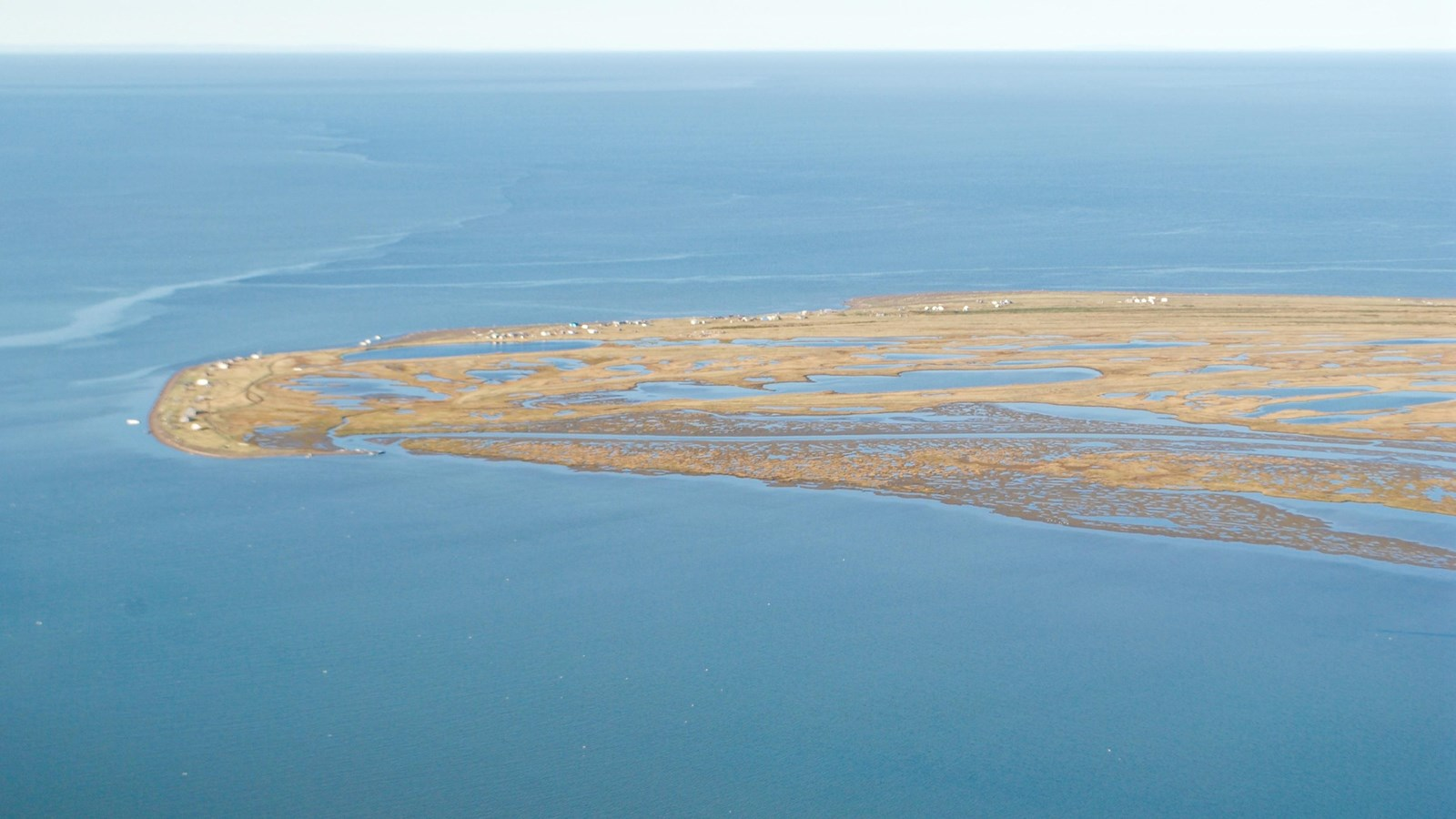
- Aerial photograph of camps at Nuvuuraq, the tip of the Sisualik spit

- Location within the state of Alaska
- Coordinates: 66°59′39″N 162°49′41″W
- Country: United States
- State: Alaska
- Borough: Northwest Arctic
- Time zone: UTC-9 (Alaska (AKST))
  - Summer (DST): UTC-8 (AKDT)
- GNIS feature ID: 1413968

Sisualik (from Iñupiaq, meaning "place that has beluga whales" from sisuaq "beluga whale") is a former Iñupiaq village and summer camp in the Northwest Arctic Borough in the U.S. state of Alaska. It is located by the Chukchi Sea shore on the Sheshalik Spit, 14 mi. northwest of Kotzebue.

The name of this village was recorded as "Sesualik" by Captain Frederick William Beechey in 1831. In the 1880 Census conducted by Ivan Petroff Sheshalik was listed as "Sheshalegamute" with a population of 100. Captain Calvin L. Hooper (1881, p. 44) published the name as "She-shore-lik," and U.S. Navy lieutenant George M. Stoney, in his manuscript map dated 1883, wrote it as "She-sur-are-lick." Maximum elevation 3 m.
