= Naknek, Alaska =

Place in Alaska

Naknek Nakniq
- Census-designated place/borough seat
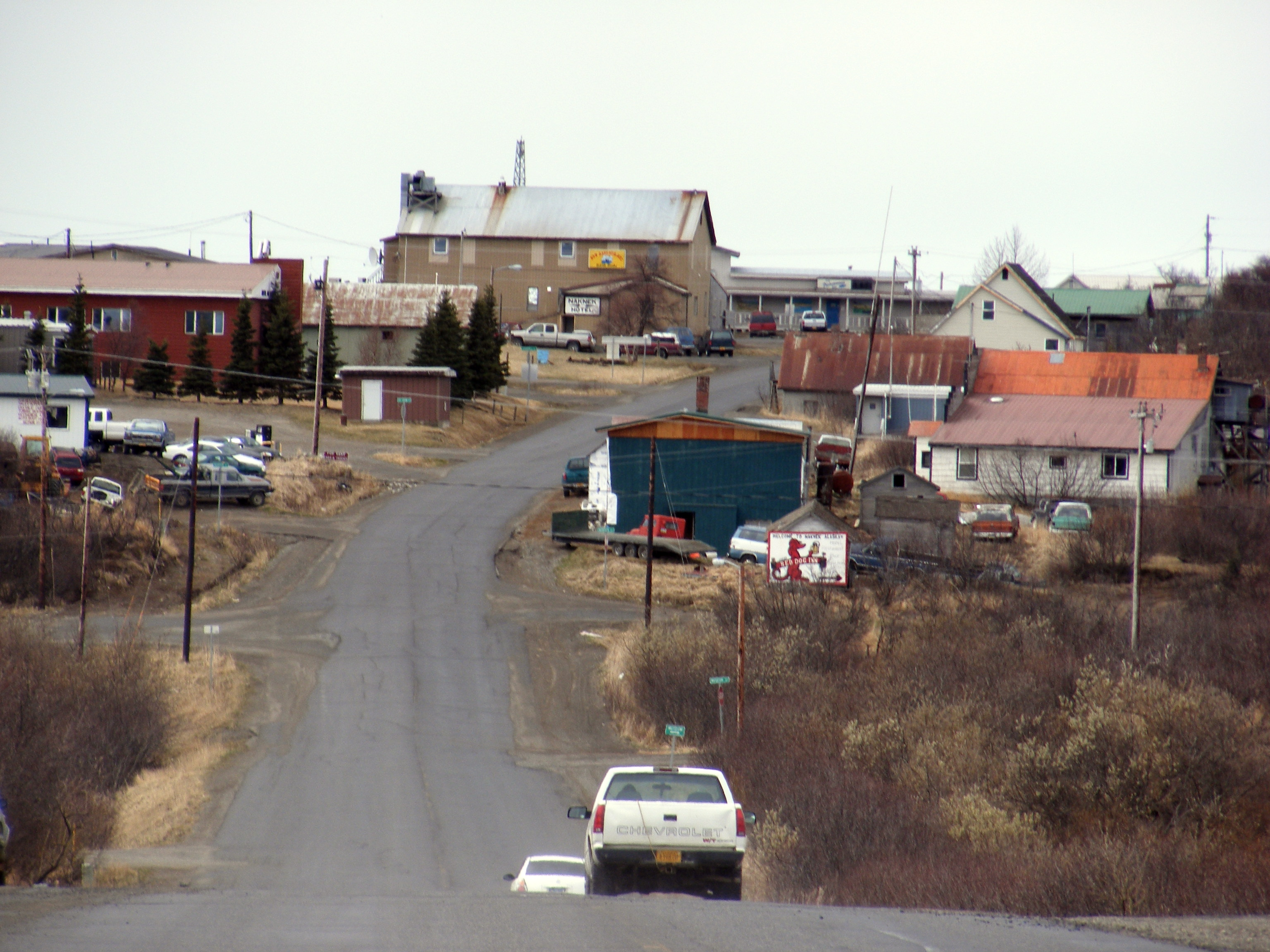
- A westward view of downtown Naknek in the spring

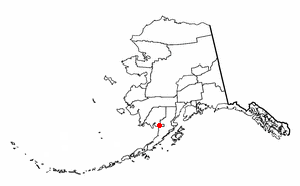
- Location of Naknek, Alaska
- Coordinates: 58°44′23″N 156°58′18″W
- Country: United States
- State: Alaska
- Borough: Bristol Bay

Government
  - Borough mayor: David R. Lax
  - State senator: Lyman Hoffman (D)
  - State rep.: Bryce Edgmon (I)

Area
  - Total: 82.20 sq mi (212.90 km^{2})
  - Land: 81.54 sq mi (211.18 km^{2})
  - Water: 0.66 sq mi (1.72 km^{2})

Population (2020)
  - Total: 470
  - Density: 5.8/sq mi (2.23/km^{2})
- Time zone: UTC-9 (Alaska (AKST))
  - Summer (DST): UTC-8 (AKDT)
- ZIP code: 99633
- Area code: 907
- FIPS code: 02-52060

Naknek (Central Yupik: Nakniq) is a census-designated place located in and the borough seat of Bristol Bay Borough, Alaska. As of the 2020 census, the population of the CDP was 470, down from 544 in 2010.

Naknek is located on the north bank of the Naknek River, close to where the river runs into the Kvichak Bay arm of the northeastern end of Bristol Bay. South Naknek is on the other side of the river.

== Geography ==
Naknek is located at 58°44′23″N 156°58′18″W (58.739857, -156.971704).

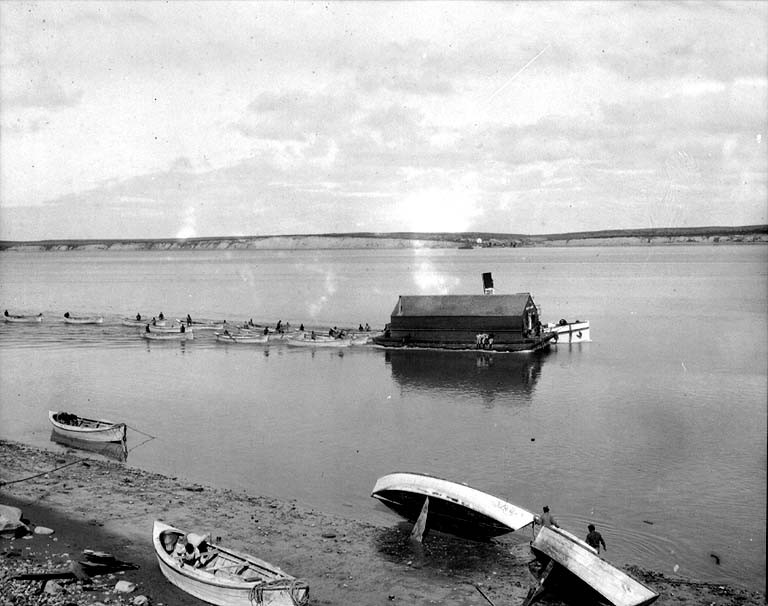
Bringing home the house scows (scow-house) at the end of the Alaska Packers Association cannery fishing season in Naknek, August 1906

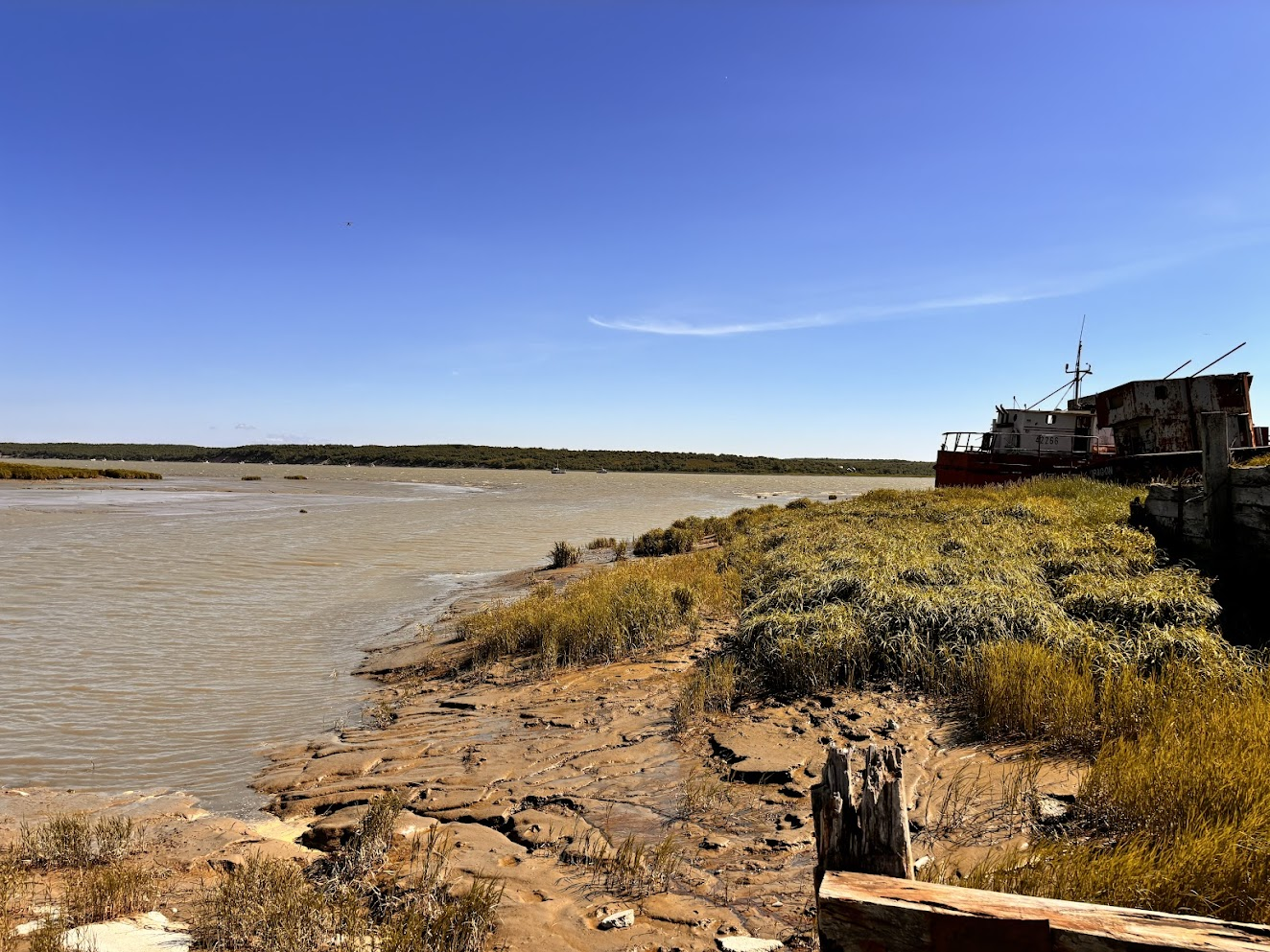
Abandoned watercraft along the Naknek River's mudflats

According to the United States Census Bureau, the CDP has a total area of 82.20 square miles (212.9 km^{2}), of which, 81.54 square miles (211.2 km^{2}) is land and 0.67 square miles (1.7 km^{2}) is water. The total area is 0.85% water.

== History ==
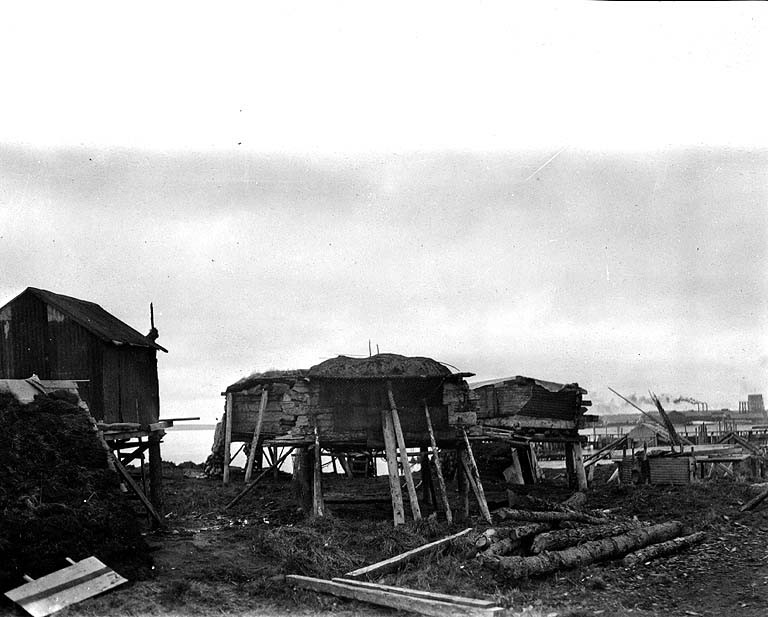
Dwellings in Naknek in 1917, photo by John Nathan Cobb

Captain Vasiliav of the Imperial Russian Navy (IRN) reported an Eskimo village here around 1821, naming it "Naugiek". Lieutenant Sarichev, also of the IRN, listed it as "Naugvik" in 1826, while Captain Tebenkov of the IRN spelled it "Naknek" in 1852. Fort Surarov or "Sowaroff" was built nearby, if not at this location. The Naknek post office was established in 1907.

== Demographics ==
Historical population
Census	Pop.	Note	%±
1880	192		—
1890	51		−73.4%
1900	431		745.1%
1920	111		—
1930	173		55.9%
1940	152		−12.1%
1950	174		14.5%
1960	249		43.1%
1970	318		27.7%
1980	318		0.0%
1990	575		80.8%
2000	678		17.9%
2010	544		−19.8%
2020	470		−13.6%
U.S. Decennial Census

Naknek first appeared on the 1880 U.S. Census as one of two unincorporated Inuit villages called "Paugwik." This apparently also included the future village of South Naknek on the south side of the Naknek River. The community appeared on Ivan Petroff's 1880 Census map as "Kinghiak", but did not include a separate population. There is confusion as to whether the villages listed on the 1890 census, Pakwik (population 93) and Kinuyak (AKA Kinghiak) (population 51) were on either the south or north side of the river, but credited "Kinuyak" here for Naknek, which also included an unnamed native village on Naknek Lake. In 1900, it returned as Naknek. It did not appear on the 1910 census, but returned again in 1920 and to date. It was made a census-designated place (CDP) as of the 1980 census.

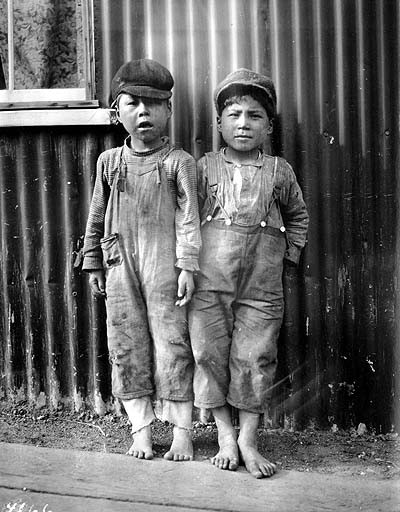
Children in Naknek, 1917

As of the census of 2000, there were 678 people, 247 households, and 162 families residing in the CDP. The population density was 8.1 inhabitants per square mile (3.1/km^{2}). There were 455 housing units at an average density of 5.4 units per square mile (2.1 units/km^{2}). The racial makeup of the CDP was 49.47% White, 2.00% Black or African American, 45.28% Native American, 0.15% Asian, 0.74% Pacific Islander, and 2.36% from two or more races. 0.29% of the population were Hispanic or Latino of any race.

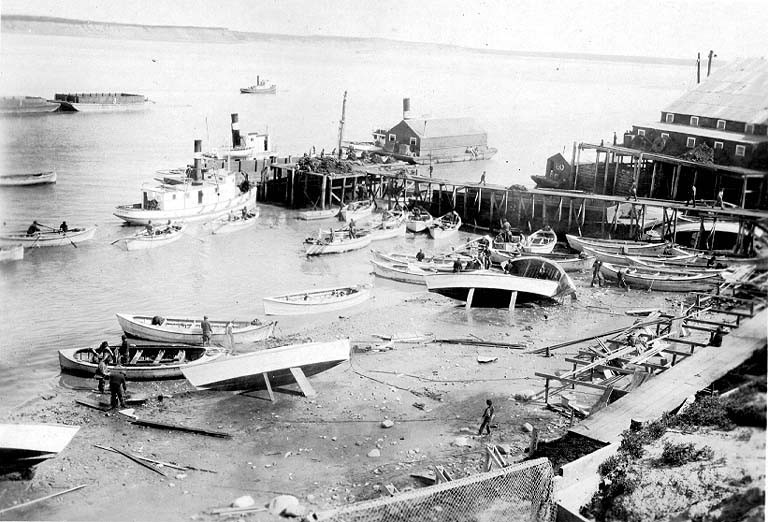
End of the fishing season at A.P.A. cannery, Naknek, 1906

There were 247 households, out of which 44.5% had children under the age of 18 living with them, 53.0% were married couples living together, 6.5% had a female householder with no husband present, and 34.4% were non-families. 25.9% of all households were made up of individuals, and 4.0% had someone living alone who was 65 years of age or older. The average household size was 2.74 and the average family size was 3.44.

In the CDP, the population was spread out, with 35.0% under the age of 18, 4.6% from 18 to 24, 34.8% from 25 to 44, 21.8% from 45 to 64, and 3.8% who were 65 years of age or older. The median age was 34 years. For every 100 females, there were 116.6 males. For every 100 females age 18 and over, there were 121.6 males.

The median income for a household in the CDP was $53,393, and the median income for a family was $65,000. Males had a median income of $44,375 versus $35,341 for females. The per capita income for the CDP was $21,182. About 3.1% of families and 3.7% of the population were below the poverty line, including 2.9% of those under the age of 18 and none of those 65 and older.

== Education ==
Naknek is served by the Bristol Bay Borough School District. Naknek Elementary and Bristol Bay Middle/High School are housed in the same building and serve about 100 students.

== Notable residents ==
- Adelheid Herrmann, Alaskan state legislator (1983–89), researcher
- Jay Hammond, Alaskan governor
