= Kvichak Bay =

Kvichak Bay is an arm on the northeast side of Bristol Bay in southern Alaska, at 58°26′N 157°54′W. It is 80 km (50 mi) long and 48 km (30 mi) wide. The Kvichak River flows into the bay at its furthest northeast point, while the Naknek River comes in from the east about 16 km (9.9 mi) to the south of the Kvichak. The Kvichak Bay and Kvichak River are known for being a habitat for sockeye salmon.

== Gallery ==
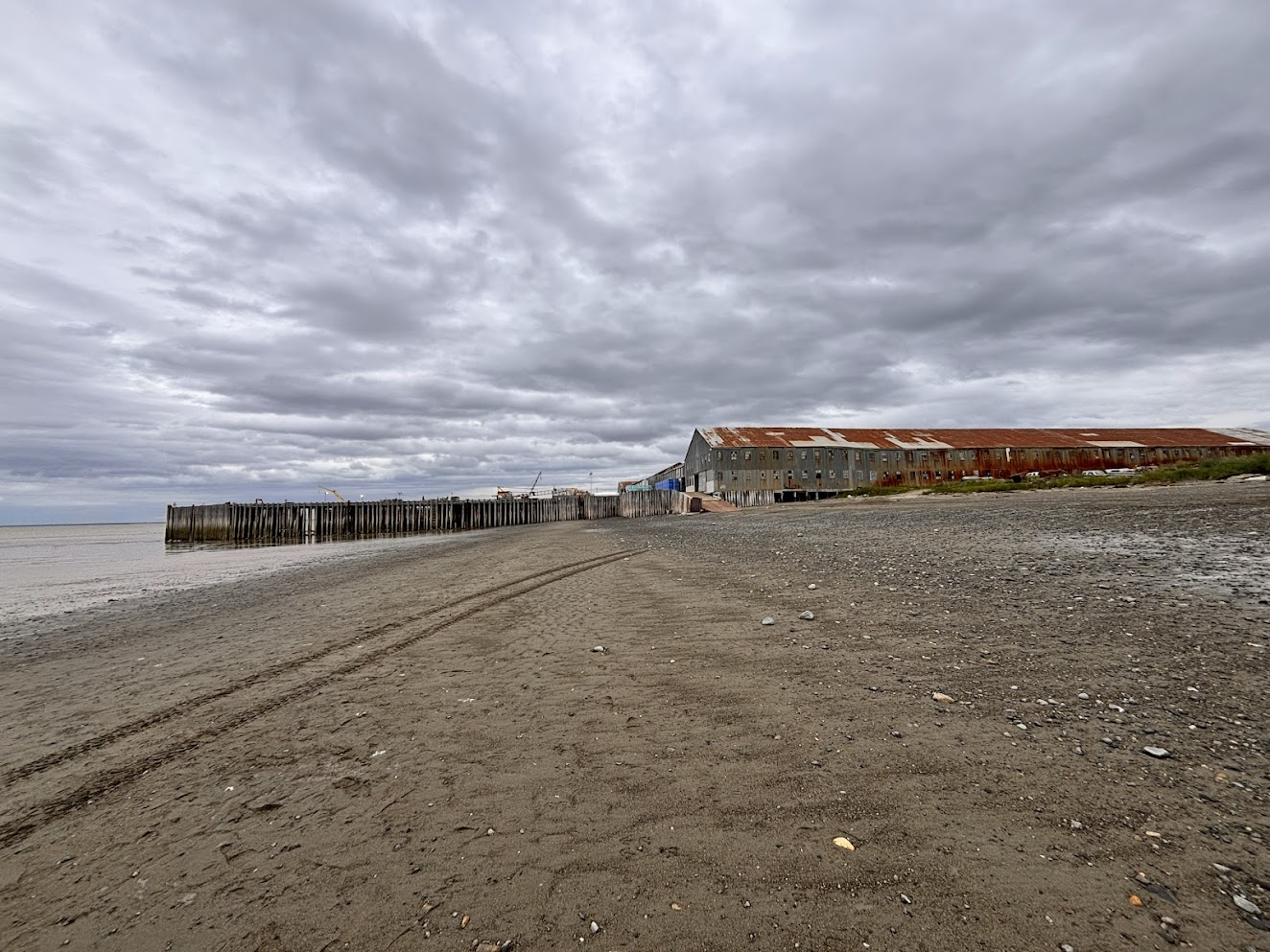
Disused pier and warehouse on the Kvichak Bay

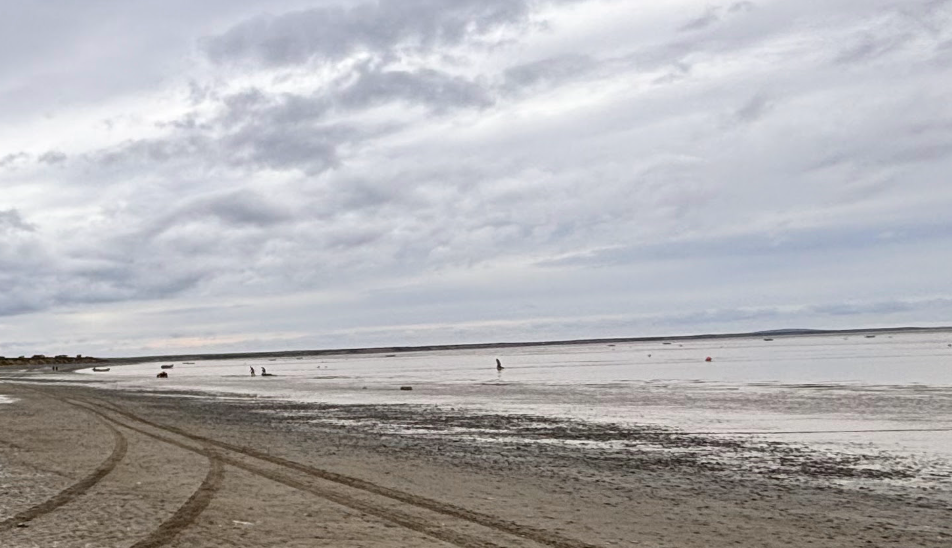
Kvichak Bay at low tide, with fishermen in the distance

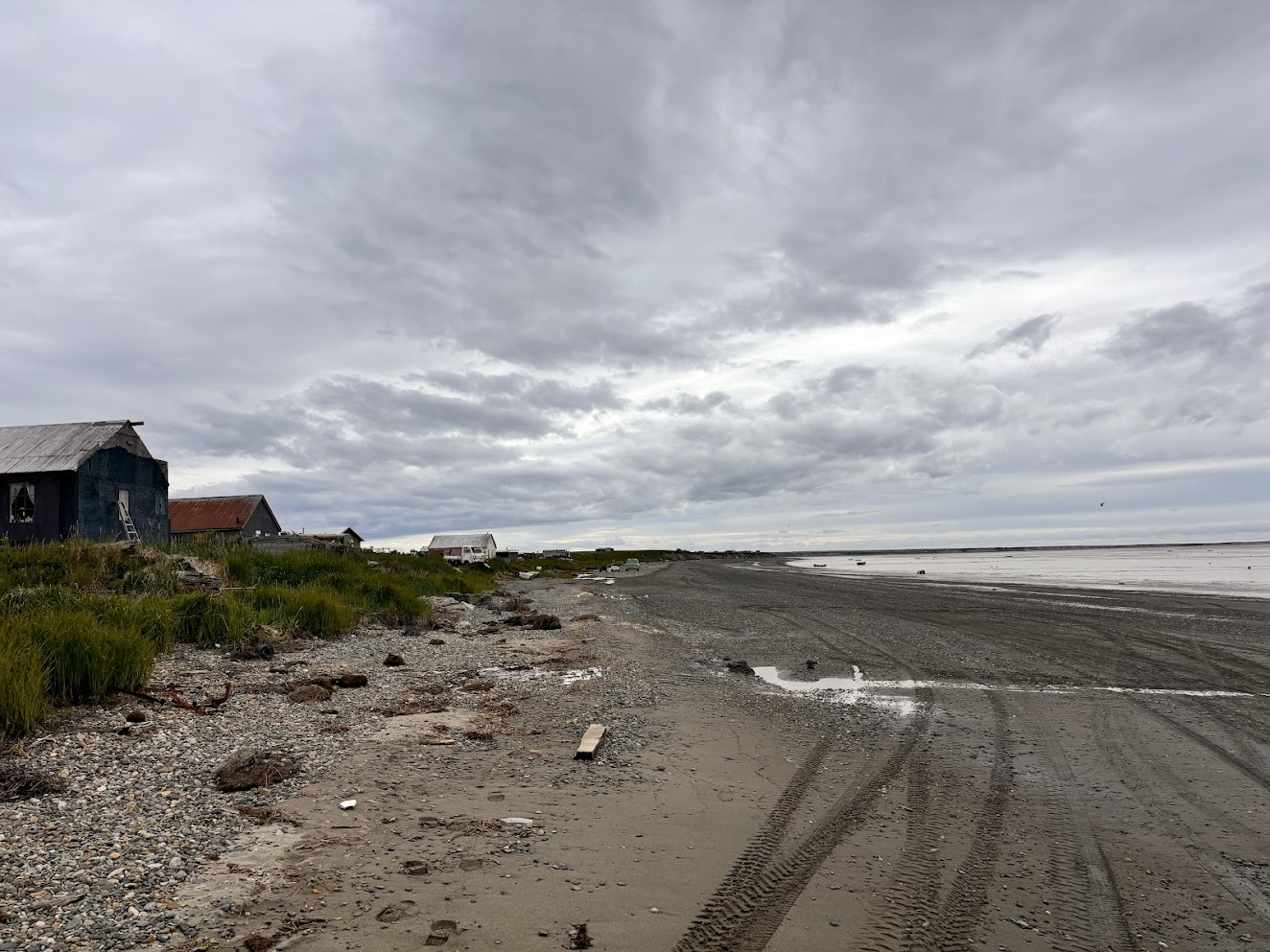
Shacks along the Kvichak Bay
