= South Naknek, Alaska =

South Naknek Qinuyang
- CDP
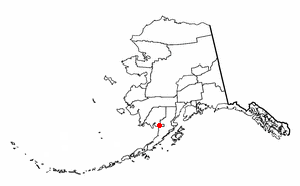
- Location of South Naknek, Alaska
- Coordinates: 58°42′42″N 157°1′3″W
- Country: United States
- State: Alaska
- Borough: Bristol Bay

Government
  - Borough mayor: David R. Lax
  - State senator: Lyman Hoffman (D)
  - State rep.: Bryce Edgmon (I)

Area
  - Total: 89.88 sq mi (232.80 km^{2})
  - Land: 87.45 sq mi (226.50 km^{2})
  - Water: 2.43 sq mi (6.30 km^{2})

Population (2020)
  - Total: 67
  - Density: 0.78/sq mi (0.3/km^{2})
- Time zone: UTC-9 (Alaska (AKST))
  - Summer (DST): UTC-8 (AKDT)
- ZIP code: 99670
- Area code: 907
- FIPS code: 02-72190

South Naknek (Central Yupik: Qinuyang) is a census-designated place (CDP) in Bristol Bay Borough, Alaska, United States. At the 2020 census the population was 67, down from 79 in 2010.

== Geography ==
South Naknek is located at 58°42′42″N 157°1′3″W (58.711630, -157.017460).

According to the United States Census Bureau, the CDP has a total area of 89.88 square miles (232.8 km^{2}), of which, 87.45 square miles (226.5 km^{2}) of it is land and 2.43 square miles (6.3 km^{2}) of it (2.70%) is water.

== Demographics ==
Historical population
| Census | Pop. | Note | %± |
|---|---|---|---|
| 1880 | 192 | | — |
| 1940 | 134 | | — |
| 1960 | 142 | | — |
| 1970 | 154 | | 8.5% |
| 1980 | 145 | | −5.8% |
| 1990 | 136 | | −6.2% |
| 2000 | 137 | | 0.7% |
| 2010 | 79 | | −42.3% |
| 2020 | 67 | | −15.2% |
U.S. Decennial Census

South Naknek first appeared on the 1880 U.S. Census as one of two unincorporated Inuit villages called "Paugwik." This apparently also included the future village of Naknek on the north side of the Naknek River. There is confusion as to whether the villages listed on the 1890 census, Pakwik (population 93) and Kinuyak (AKA Kinghiak) (population 51) were on either the south or north side of the river. Not until the 1940 census would South Naknek return again, and (for the first time) under that name. It did not appear in 1950, but returned again in 1960 and in every successive census. It was made a census-designated place (CDP) as of the 1980 census. Within the present boundaries is also the former village of Savonoski, which appeared once on the 1940 census with a population of 20, located east of the village of South Naknek (now a ghost). This is not to be confused with a village of the same name, which was evacuated following the Katmai eruptions of 1912.

As of the census of 2000, there were 137 people, 46 households, and 33 families residing in the CDP. The population density was 1.4 inhabitants per square mile (0.54/km^{2}). There were 137 housing units at an average density of 1.4 units per square mile (0.54 units/km^{2}). The racial makeup of the CDP was 13.14% White, 1.46% Black or African American, 83.94% Native American, 0.73% Asian and 0.73% Pacific Islander. 2.19% of the population were Hispanic or Latino of any race.

There were 46 households, out of which 39.1% had children under the age of 18 living with them, 50.0% were married couples living together, 10.9% had a female householder with no husband present, and 26.1% were non-families. 15.2% of all households were made up of individuals, and 2.2% had someone living alone who was 65 years of age or older. The average household size was 2.98 and the average family size was 3.32.

In the CDP, the population was spread out, with 29.9% under the age of 18, 8.8% from 18 to 24, 32.1% from 25 to 44, 22.6% from 45 to 64, and 6.6% who were 65 years of age or older. The median age was 36 years. For every 100 females, there were 128.3 males. For every 100 females age 18 and over, there were 128.6 males.

The median income for a household in the CDP was $22,344, and the median income for a family was $44,375. Males had a median income of $30,625 versus $23,750 for females. The per capita income for the CDP was $13,019. There were 16.1% of families and 27.1% of the population living below the poverty line, including 41.7% of under eighteens and none of those over 64.

== Education ==
Young residents of South Naknek attend high school at Bristol Bay High School, in Naknek, Alaska, which is located on the opposite side of the river. There is no bridge connecting the two towns, so schoolchildren must be flown across the river at the beginning and end of each school day. The Bristol Bay School District has provided this service as recently as 2008 for schoolchildren whose "school bus" from South Naknek to Naknek is an airplane.

== Notable people ==
- Deenaalee Chase-Hodgdon, commercial fisher, collective founder, and storyteller
