= Wassillie Trefon Dena'ina Fish Cache =

- U.S. National Register of Historic Places
- Alaska Heritage Resources Survey
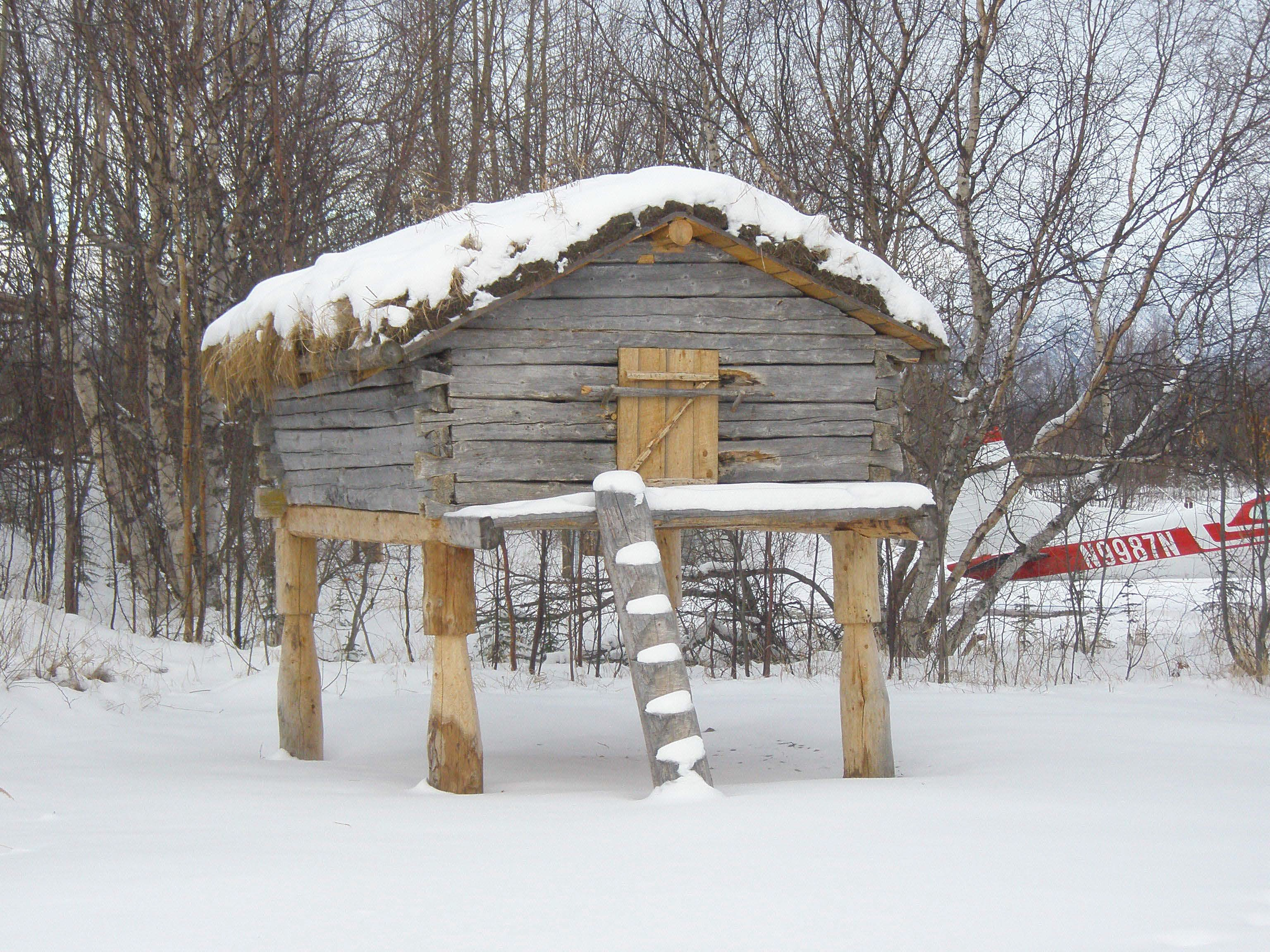

- Location within Alaska
- Location: 1 Park Place, Lake Clark National Park and Preserve, Port Alsworth, Alaska
- Coordinates: 60°11′51″N 154°19′24″W
- Built: c. 1920
- NRHP reference No.: 13000348
- AHRS No.: XLC-00251
- Added to NRHP: June 5, 2013

The Wassillie Trefon Dena'ina Fish Cache is a historically important fish cache (backcountry food storage structure) that is now listed on the National Register of Historic Places. It qualified for this designation partly because it was a uniquely well-preserved example of traditional Dena'ina Athabascan fish-caching buildings in the vicinity of Lakes Clark and Iliamna. It is about 9 by 10 feet (2.7 m × 3.0 m) in dimension, and is set on poles that are intended to be difficult for animals to climb. It was built without nails or spikes.

The cache was originally built in about 1920 at a location on Miller Creek and has been moved several times; it is now located near the Lake Clark National Park and Preserve's visitor center.

== See also ==
- National Register of Historic Places listings in Lake and Peninsula Borough, Alaska
- National Register of Historic Places listings in Lake Clark National Park and Preserve
