= Tlikakila River =

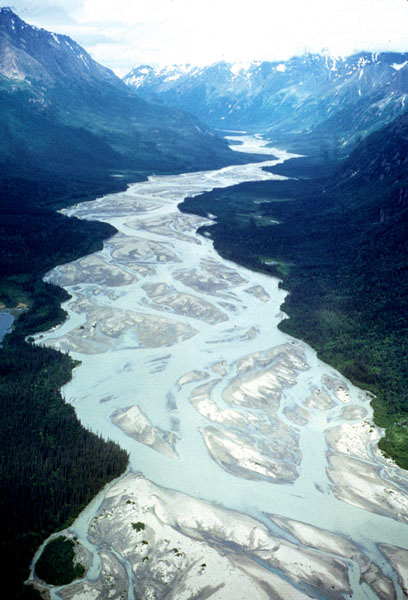
- Flowing through mountains

- Location of the mouth of the Tlikakila River in Alaska

Location
- Country: United States
- State: Alaska
- Borough: Kenai Peninsula, Lake and Peninsula

Physical characteristics
- Source: Summit Lake
  - location: Lake Clark National Park, Aleutian Range, Kenai Peninsula Borough
  - coordinates: 60°47′06″N 152°47′46″W
  - elevation: 888 ft (271 m)
- Mouth: Little Clark Lake
  - location: 45 miles (72 km) northeast of Nondalton, Lake and Peninsula Borough
  - coordinates: 60°23′31″N 153°48′37″W
  - elevation: 253 ft (77 m)
- Length: 51 mi (82 km)
- Basin size: 622 sq mi (1,610 km^{2})

National Wild and Scenic River
- Type: Wild
- Designated: December 2, 1980

The Tlikakila River (Dena'ina Athabascan Łiq'a Qilanhtnu, literally "salmon-are-there river") is a stream, 51 miles (82 km) long, in the U.S. state of Alaska. The river, lying entirely within Lake Clark National Park, flows southwest from Summit Lake in the Chigmit Mountains of the Aleutian Range to Lake Clark.

The Tlikakila is one of three national "wild rivers" in Lake Clark National Park. The other two are the Mulchatna and the Chilikadrotna, all added in 1980 to the National Wild and Scenic Rivers System.

== Boating ==
Varying from Class I (easy) to III (difficult) on the International Scale of River Difficulty, the Tlikakila River is floatable by raft and kayak. The Alaska River Guide describes it as suitable for "intermediate boaters with good wilderness skills". To reach the floatable parts of the river from Summit Lake, boaters must make a 2-mile (3 km) portage. Dangers include Class III rapids, which may require a second portage below the confluence with the North Fork Tlikakila River. Bears pose another danger, as does quicksand on the lower river.

== See also ==
- List of rivers of Alaska
