= Dr. Elmer Bly House =

Historic house in Alaska, United States

- U.S. National Register of Historic Places
- Alaska Heritage Resources Survey
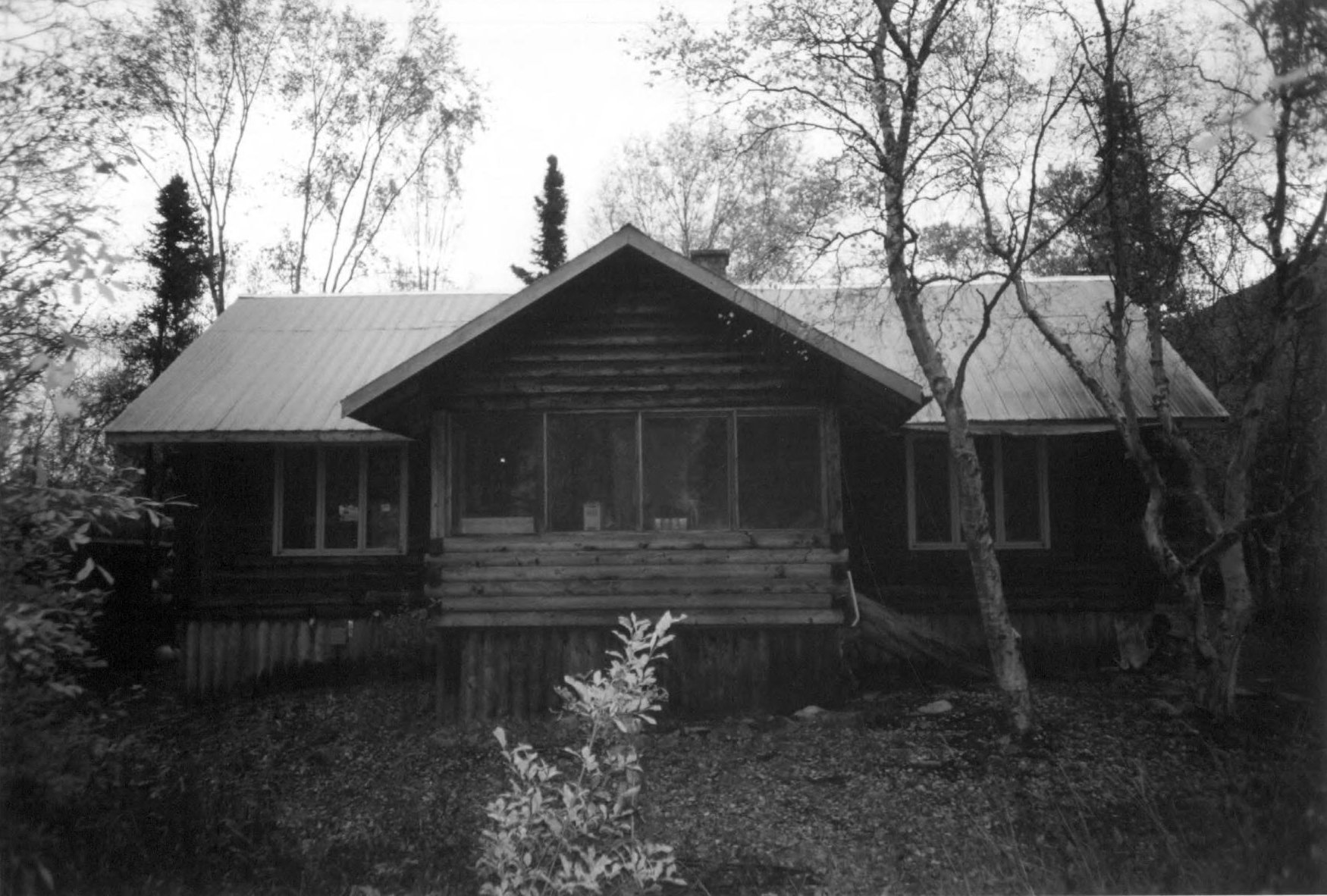
- Bly House, 2005

- Location within Alaska
- Location: Hardenburg Bay, Port Alsworth, Alaska
- Coordinates: 60°12′17″N 154°18′25″W
- Area: 3.94 acres (1.59 ha)
- Built: 1947
- Built by: Joe Thompson
- Architect: Elmer Bly
- NRHP reference No.: 06000240
- AHRS No.: XLC-00160
- Added to NRHP: April 12, 2006

The Dr. Elmer Bly House, also known as Bly House and The Point, is a historic log house in Port Alsworth, Alaska. It is located on a spit of land adjacent to Hardenburg Bay, an inlet of Lake Clark, and presently houses administrative offices of the Lake Clark National Park and Preserve. The house is a 1 1/2-story log structure, measuring 23 by 37 feet (7.0 m × 11.3 m). It has a projecting screened arctic entrance vestibule measuring 10 by 13 feet (3.0 m × 4.0 m). The logs used in its construction are sawn on three sides at a local sawmill. The house was built in 1947 by Dr. Elmer Bly, a dentist, and Joe Thompson. Bly operated his dental practice here from 1947 to 1953. It was purchased by the National Park Service 1979, at which time the interior was modernized and the exterior rehabilitated.

The house was listed on the National Register of Historic Places in 2006.

== See also ==
- National Register of Historic Places listings in Lake and Peninsula Borough, Alaska
- National Register of Historic Places listings in Lake Clark National Park and Preserve
