= Libby's No. 23 =

- LIBBY'S No. 23 (Bristol Bay double ender)
- U.S. National Register of Historic Places
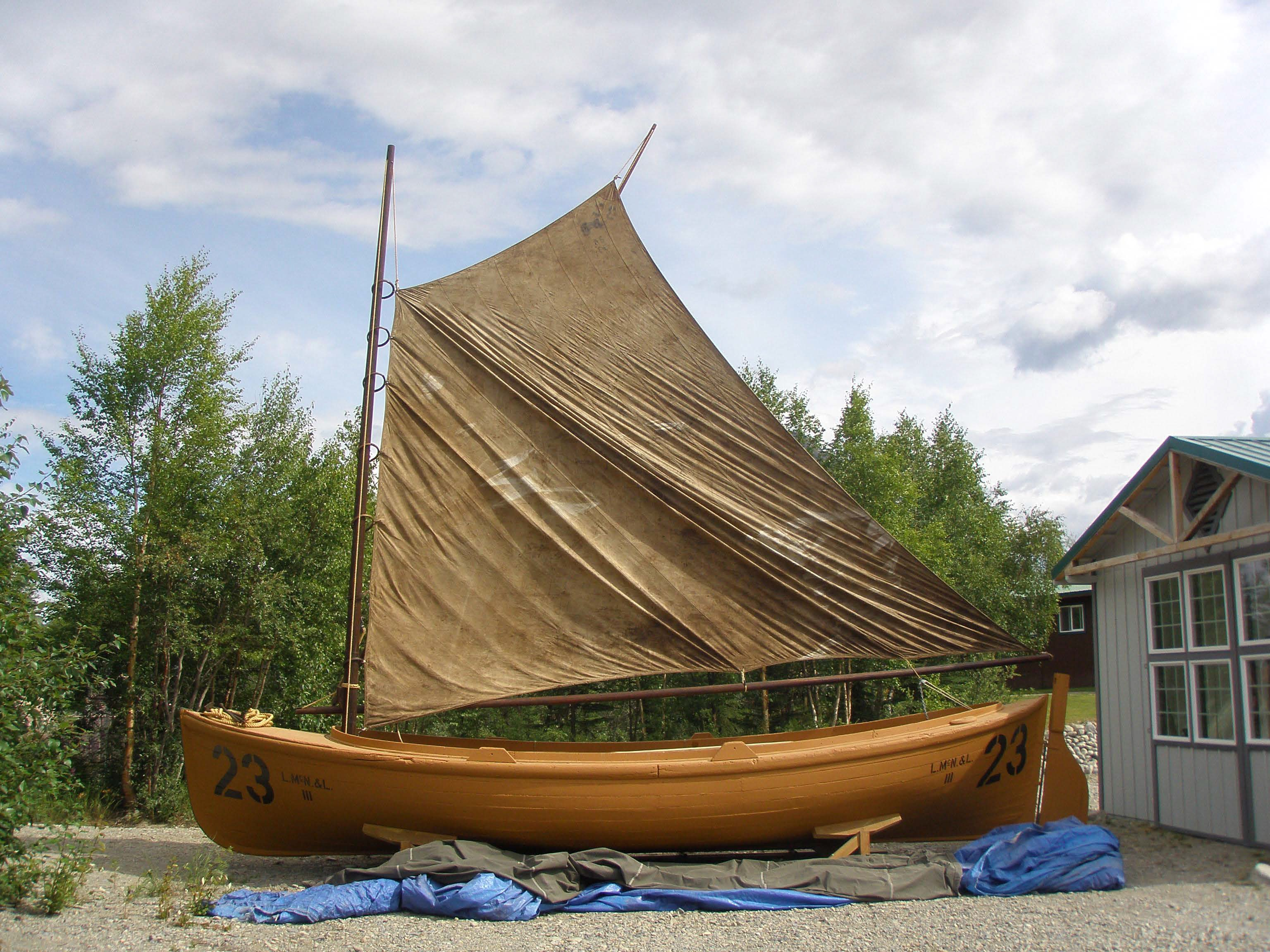

- Location within Alaska
- Location: Lake Clark National Park and Preserve Headquarters, 1 Park Place, Port Alsworth, Alaska
- Coordinates: 60°11′51″N 154°19′20″W
- Area: less than one acre
- Built: 1914
- Built by: Seattle Shipbuilding Company
- NRHP reference No.: 13000379
- Added to NRHP: June 14, 2013

Libby's No. 23 is a historic sail-powered fishing vessel, now on display at the Lake Clark National Park and Preserve visitors center in Port Alsworth, Alaska. Built in 1914, she served in the salmon fishery of Bristol Bay until about 1951, owned by the Libby's cannery and worked by two-man crews. She is 29 feet 6 inches (8.99 m) long, with a beam of 9 feet 2 inches (2.79 m) and a depth of 4 feet (1.2 m). Its bow and stern are roughly the same shape, giving the style its name. Despite its use for freight and recreation between 1953 and 1997, the boat has retained much of its original equipment, and was fully restored by the National Park Service between 1998 and 2005, acquiring replacement parts from similar boats and removing an added motor. It is normally rigged with a mainsail and spritsail, but these are only raised when the boat is taken out of its custom-built boathouse.

The boat was listed on the National Register of Historic Places in 2013.

== See also ==
- National Register of Historic Places listings in Lake and Peninsula Borough, Alaska
- National Register of Historic Places listings in Lake Clark National Park and Preserve
