= Kasna Creek Mining District =

Archaeological site in Alaska, United States

- U.S. National Register of Historic Places
- U.S. Historic district
- Location: Address restricted
- Nearest city: Port Alsworth, Alaska
- Area: 176.9 acres (71.6 ha)
- Built: 1906
- NRHP reference No.: 10000017
- Added to NRHP: February 17, 2010

The Kasna Creek Mining District encompasses a historic copper mining claim on the Alaska Peninsula of southwestern Alaska. The claim is located in the watershed of Kasna Creek, located on the south side of Kontrashibuna Lake, east of Port Alsworth, and was first staked in 1906 by Charles Brooks and Count Charles Von Hardenberg. They were reported in 1909 to have built a house and storage building near the mouth of the creek. Although never developed, the claim continued to be of interest to mining companies into the 1950s, and was initially excluded from the nearby Lake Clark National Park and Preserve because of outstanding claims.

The area was listed on the National Register of Historic Places in 2010.

== See also ==
- National Register of Historic Places listings in Lake and Peninsula Borough, Alaska
