= Kijik, Alaska =

Ghost town in Alaska, United States

- Kijik Archeological District
- U.S. National Register of Historic Places
- U.S. National Historic Landmark District
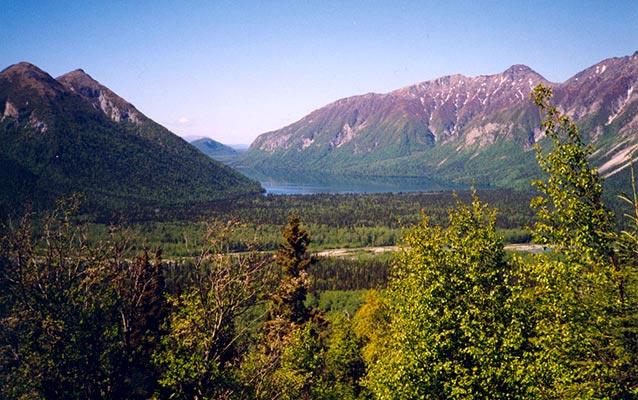
- Scenery in the district

- Location within Alaska
- Location: Address restricted, Lake Clark National Park and Preserve
- Nearest city: Port Alsworth, Alaska
- Area: 1,920 acres (780 ha)
- NRHP reference No.: 94001644

Significant dates
- Added to NRHP: October 12, 1994
- Designated NHLD: October 12, 1994
- Kijik Historic District
- U.S. National Register of Historic Places
- U.S. Historic district
- Location: Address restricted, Lake Clark National Park and Preserve
- Nearest city: Port Alsworth, Alaska
- Area: 12 acres (4.9 ha)
- NRHP reference No.: 79000410
- Added to NRHP: January 29, 1979

Kijik (Dena'ina: Qizhjeh) is a ghost town in Lake and Peninsula Borough, Alaska, United States. An Athabascan village that was established on the shores of Lake Clark in the Alaska Range, its population was recorded at 91 in the 1880 United States census and declined thereafter, falling to approximately 25 individuals by 1904. Today, the village has been abandoned. The ghost town is located within the bounds of Lake Clark National Park and Preserve.

The historic portion of the village was the subject of archaeological and ethnological research in the 1960s. Interviews with Dena'ina elders in Nondalton established that the people of Kijik relocated to Old Nondalton (not far from present-day Nondalton) in the early 20th century, probably to be closer to trading posts and the canneries of Bristol Bay. A survey expedition that visited the site in 1909 reported it to be abandoned. A major archaeological excavation of the historic village took place in 1966, exposing twelve foundational remnants of log houses (many of the houses having apparently been moved to Old Nondalton at the time of the relocation), and two of what appeared to be larger communal structures.

In 1979, twelve acres of the village site were added to the National Register of Historic Places as a historic district. A much larger area, encompassing a significant number of archaeological sites related to the habitation and use of the area from at least the 12th century forward, was designated a National Historic Landmark District in 1994, for the unique concentration of sites related to the inland Dena'ina people.

The community was known by many other names than "Kijik" during its history, including "Lake Clark Village", "Nijik", "Nikhkak", "Nikhak", and "Old Keegik". Its current name has been spelled in a wide variety of ways, including "Keechik", "Keeghik", "Keejik", "Keggik", "Keygik", "Kichak", "Kichik", "Kilchik", and "Kilchikh".

== Demographics ==
Historical population
Census	Pop.	Note	%±
1880	91		—
1890	42		−53.8%
U.S. Decennial Census

Kijik first appeared on the 1880 U.S. Census as the unincorporated Tinneh village of "Kichik". It appeared again on the 1890 U.S. Census as "Nikhkak". It has not reported since and was abandoned some time before 1909.

== See also ==
- List of National Historic Landmarks in Alaska
- National Register of Historic Places listings in Lake and Peninsula Borough, Alaska
- National Register of Historic Places listings in Lake Clark National Park and Preserve
