= Clam Cove Pictograph Site =

Archaeological site in Alaska, United States

- U.S. National Register of Historic Places
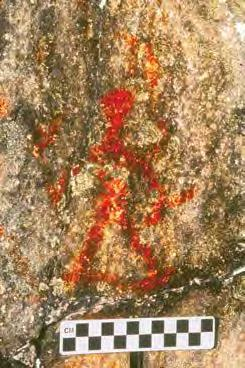
- A digitally enhanced image of a human figure
- Location: Lake Clark National Park and Preserve
- Nearest city: Port Alsworth, Alaska
- NRHP reference No.: 100001904
- Added to NRHP: December 22, 2017

The Clam Cove Pictograph Site is a series of prehistoric rock art on the Gulf of Alaska coast of Lake Clark National Park and Preserve in southern Alaska. The site consists of a pair of pictograph panels, oriented facing south and west. Figures include numerous depictions of humans, and what appear to be killer whales. The site has long known to the local Alutiiq people, whose native corporation has identified it as a particular site of historic interest. It was first visited by an archaeologist in 1968, and its deteriorating figures (mainly due to weathering) have been recorded on a number of occasions since.

The site was listed on the National Register of Historic Places in 2017.

== See also ==
- National Register of Historic Places listings in Kenai Peninsula Borough, Alaska
- National Register of Historic Places listings in Lake Clark National Park and Preserve
