= National Register of Historic Places listings in Lake Clark National Park and Preserve =

This is a list of the National Register of Historic Places listings in Lake Clark National Park and Preserve.

This is intended to be a complete list of the properties and districts on the National Register of Historic Places in Lake Clark National Park and Preserve, Alaska, United States. The locations of National Register properties and districts for which the latitude and longitude coordinates are included below, may be seen in a Google map.

There are 9 properties and districts listed on the National Register in the preserve, one of which is a National Historic Landmark.

This National Park Service list is complete through NPS recent listings posted June 20, 2025.

== Current listings ==
	Name on the Register	Image	Date listed	Location	City or town	Description
1	Dr. Elmer Bly House	Dr. Elmer Bly House	April 12, 2006 (#06000240)	Hardenburg Bay; 60°12′17″N 154°18′25″W	Port Alsworth	Now the park's headquarters building.
2	Clam Cove Pictograph Site	Clam Cove Pictograph Site	December 22, 2017 (#100001904)	Address restricted	Port Alsworth vicinity	
3	Kasna Creek Mining District		February 17, 2010 (#10000017)	Address restricted	Port Alsworth	
4	Kijik Archeological District	Kijik Archeological District	October 12, 1994 (#94001644)	Address restricted	Port Alsworth	
5	Kijik Historic District	Kijik Historic District	January 29, 1979 (#79000410)	Address restricted	Port Alsworth	Site of a former Dena'ina village.
6	LIBBY'S NO. 23 (bristol bay double ender)	LIBBY'S NO. 23 (bristol bay double ender)	June 14, 2013 (#13000379)	1 Park Place; 60°11′51″N 154°19′20″W	Port Alsworth	
7	Richard Proenneke Site	Richard Proenneke Site	March 8, 2007 (#06000241)	Southeastern end of upper Twin Lakes, Lake Clark National Park and Preserve; 60°38′42″N 153°49′15″W	Port Alsworth	
8	Two Lakes Archeological District		August 12, 2019 (#100004254)	Address Restricted	Port Alsworth vicinity	
9	Wassillie Trefon Dena'ina Fish Cache	Wassillie Trefon Dena'ina Fish Cache	June 5, 2013 (#13000348)	1 Park Place; 60°11′51″N 154°19′24″W	Port Alsworth	

== See also ==
- National Register of Historic Places listings in Lake and Peninsula Borough, Alaska
- List of National Historic Landmarks in Alaska
- National Register of Historic Places listings in Alaska
