= Kontrashibuna Lake =

Lake in the state of Alaska, United States

- Location within Alaska
- Location: Lake and Peninsula Borough, Alaska, United States
- Coordinates: 60°11′14″N 154°01′54″W
- Basin countries: United States
- Max. length: 12.3 mi (19.8 km)

Kontrashibuna Lake is a large lake in southwestern Alaska. It is located 30 miles northwest of Mount Iliamna and 30 miles northeast of Nondalton. It is 12.3 miles long and is located at 60.1872°N 154.0317°W. Kontrashibuna Lake is a part of the Lake Clark National Park.
