= Richard Proenneke =

American naturalist (1916–2003)

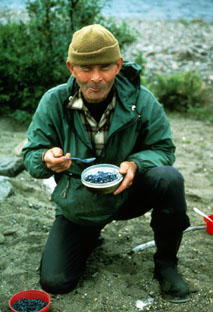
- Born: Richard Louis Proenneke; May 4, 1916; Primrose, Iowa, U.S.
- Died: April 20, 2003 (aged 86); Hemet, California, U.S.
- Other name: Dick Proenneke
- Occupations: Heavy equipment operator, carpenter, mechanic
- Awards: 1999 National Outdoor Book Award (NOBA)
- Military career
- Allegiance: United States
- Branch: United States Navy
- Service years: 1941–1945
- Conflicts: World War II

Richard Louis Proenneke (/ˈprɛnəkiː/; May 4, 1916 – April 20, 2003) was an American self-educated naturalist, conservationist, writer, and wildlife photographer who, from the age of about 51, lived alone for some 31 years (1968–1999) in the mountains of Alaska in a log cabin that he constructed by hand near the shore of Twin Lakes. Proenneke hunted, fished, raised and gathered much of his own food, and also had supplies flown in occasionally. He was also known as one of the first individuals to recycle and repurpose all types of objects without being environmentally wasteful. Proenneke documented his activities in journals and on film and also recorded valuable meteorological and natural data. The journals and film were later used by others to write books and produce documentaries about his time in the wilderness.

Proenneke bequeathed his cabin to the National Park Service upon his death and it was included in the National Register of Historic Places four years later. The cabin is a popular attraction of Lake Clark National Park.

== Early life ==
Proenneke descended from a family of German immigrants. His father, William Christian Proenneke (1880–1972), served in World War I, and made his living as a house painter, carpenter and well driller. His mother, Laura (née Bonn) (1884–1966) was a homemaker and gardener. His parents married in December 1909 and had three daughters and four sons: Robert, Helen, Lorene, Richard (Dick), Florence, Paul, and Raymond (Jake). The year of Proenneke's birth is often mistakenly given as 1917, but social security and census records note Richard Louis Proenneke was born in Primrose, Iowa, on May 4, 1916.

Proenneke completed primary school in Primrose, but left high school after two years because he did not enjoy it. Until 1939, he worked in proximity to Primrose driving tractors, working with farm equipment, and doing typical chores Iowa family farms required at the time. He also admired motorcycles and obtained a Harley Davidson as a teen.

== Naval career ==
Proenneke enlisted in the United States Navy the day after the attack on Pearl Harbor and served as a carpenter. He spent almost two years at Pearl Harbor and was later stationed in San Francisco, waiting for a new ship assignment. After hiking on a mountain near San Francisco, he contracted rheumatic fever and was hospitalized at Norco Naval Hospital for six months. During his convalescence, the war ended and he was given a medical discharge from the Navy in 1945. According to one of his biographers and friend, Sam Keith, the illness was very revealing for Proenneke, who decided to devote the rest of his life to the strength and health of his body.

== Later career ==
Following his discharge from the Navy, Proenneke went to school to become a diesel mechanic. The combination of his high intelligence, adaptability, and strong work ethic helped him become a skilled technician. Though adept at his trade, Proenneke eventually yielded to his love of nature and moved to Oregon to work at a sheep ranch. He moved to Shuyak Island, Alaska, in 1950.

For several years, he worked as a heavy equipment operator and repairman on the Naval Air Station at Kodiak. He spent the next several years working throughout Alaska as both a salmon fisherman and diesel technician. He worked for the Fish and Wildlife Service at King Salmon on the Alaska Peninsula. His skills as a technician were well-known and sought after, and he was able to save for retirement.

== Twin Lakes cabin ==
- Richard Proenneke Site
- U.S. National Register of Historic Places
- U.S. Historic district
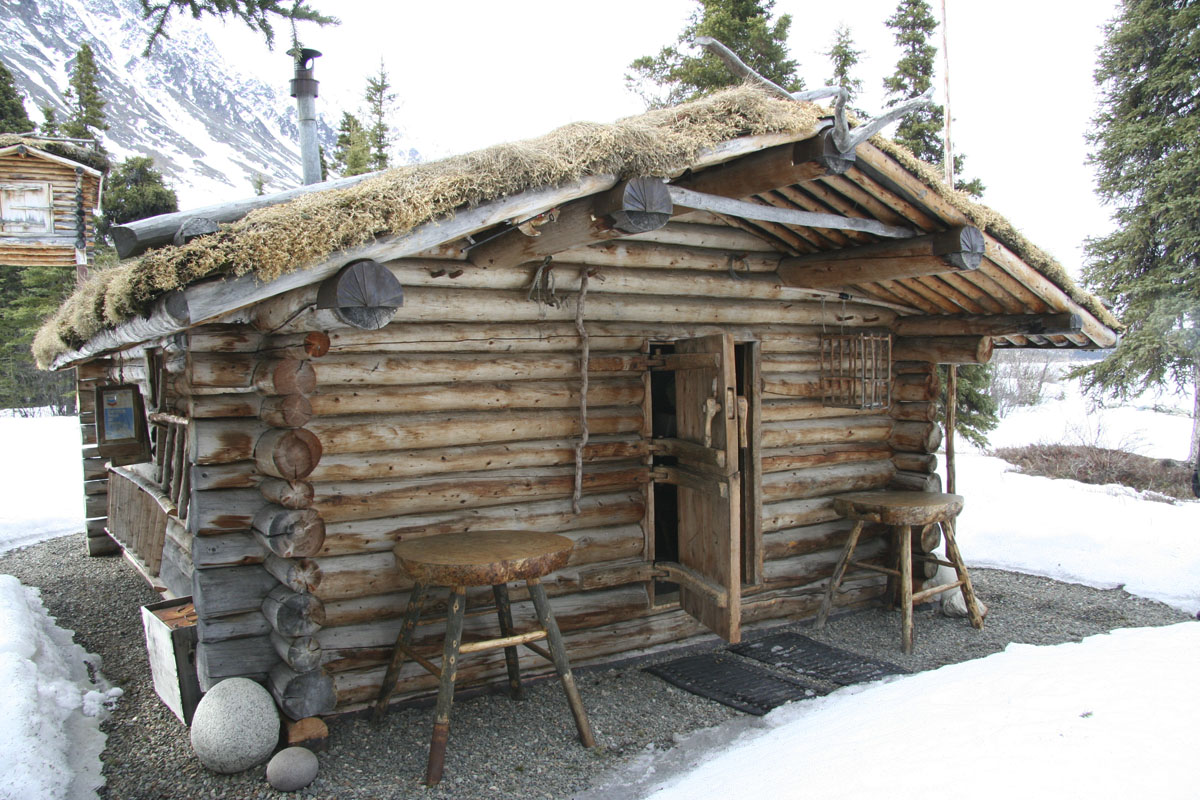
- Park Service photo of the cabin

- Location within Alaska
- Location: Southeastern end of upper Twin Lakes, Lake Clark National Park and Preserve
- Nearest city: Port Alsworth, Alaska
- Coordinates: 60°38′42″N 153°49′15″W
- Area: less than one acre
- Built: 1967
- Built by: Richard Louis "Dick" Proenneke
- NRHP reference No.: 06000241
- Added to NRHP: March 8, 2007

On May 21, 1968, Proenneke arrived at his new place of retirement at Twin Lakes. Beforehand, he made arrangements to use a cabin on Upper Twin Lake owned by retired Navy Captain Spike Carrithers and his wife Hope of Kodiak (in whose care he had left his camper). This cabin was well-situated on the lake and close to the site that Proenneke chose for the construction of his own cabin.

Proenneke's cabin is handmade and is notable for its fine craftsmanship as a result of his carpentry and woodworking skills; he made 8mm films covering its construction. Most of the structure and the furnishings are made from materials in and around the site, from the gravel taken from the lake bed to create the cabin's base, to the trees he selected, cut down, and then hand-cut with interlocking joints to create the walls and roof rafter framing. The fireplace and flue were made from stones he dug from around the site and mortared in place to create the chimney and hearth. He used metal containers for food storage: one-gallon cans were cut into basin shapes and buried below the frost line. This ensured that fruit and perishables could be stored for prolonged periods in the cool earth, yet still be accessible when the winter months froze the ground above them. Proenneke's friend, bush pilot and missionary Leon Reid "Babe" Alsworth, returned periodically by seaplane or ski-plane to bring mail, food, and orders that Proenneke placed through him to Sears.

Proenneke remained at Twin Lakes for the next sixteen months, after which he briefly went home to visit relatives and secure more supplies. He returned to Twin Lakes the following spring and remained there for most of the next thirty years, traveling to the contiguous United States only occasionally to visit his family. He made a film record of his solitary life, which was later re-edited and made into the documentary Alone in the Wilderness. In 2011 a sequel was produced after enough footage for at least two more programs was discovered. Alone in the Wilderness: Part 2 premiered on December 2, 2011.

Proenneke's cabin was added to the National Register of Historic Places in 2007. The site is a popular attraction for many who want to personally experience parts of Proenneke's life and values.

== Death and legacy ==
In 1999, at age 83, Proenneke left his cabin and moved to Hemet, California, where he lived the remainder of his life with his brother Raymond "Jake" Proenneke. He died of a stroke on April 20, 2003, at the age of 86. He willed his cabin to the National Park Service, and it remains a popular visitor attraction in the still-remote Twin Lakes region of Lake Clark National Park.

Sam Keith, who came to know Proenneke at the Kodiak Naval Station and went on numerous hunting and fishing trips with him, suggested that Proenneke's journals might be the basis for a good book. In 1973, Keith published the book One Man's Wilderness: An Alaskan Odyssey, based on Proenneke's journals and photography. Proenneke however alleged that Keith had "changed some things" to embellish the story, such as writing that Proenneke had assumed a role as King of Bears and wielded power over them. After years in print it was reissued in a new format in 1999, winning that year's National Outdoor Book Award (NOBA). A hardcover "commemorative edition", celebrating the fiftieth anniversary of when Proenneke first broke ground and made his way in the Alaskan wilds in 1968 was published by Alaska Northwest Books in 2018. In 2003, some of the copyrighted text from the book and some of Proenneke's film were used with permission in the documentary Alone in the Wilderness, which began appearing on U.S. Public Television. It follows Proenneke's life as he builds the cabin from the surrounding natural resources and includes his film footage and narration of wildlife, weather, and the natural scenery while he goes about his daily routine over the course of the winter months.

In 2005, the National Park Service and the Alaska Natural History Association published More Readings From One Man's Wilderness, another volume of Proenneke's journal entries. The book, edited by John Branson, a longtime Lake Clark National Park employee and friend of Proenneke, covers the years when the park was established. Proenneke had a very close relationship with the Park Service, assisting them in filming sensitive areas and notifying them if poachers were in the area.

The Early Years: The Journals of Richard L. Proenneke 1967–1973 was published by Alaska Geographic in 2010. As with More Readings From One Man's Wilderness, the volume was edited by John Branson. This collection of journals covers Proennekes' first years at Twin Lakes, including the construction of his cabin and cache. The journal entries overlap those in Sam Keith's edited collection of some of Proenneke's journals, One Man's Wilderness: An Alaskan Odyssey. But unlike that book—in which Keith frequently modified Proenneke's writing style—The Early Years presents Proenneke's journals with minimal or no modification.

In 2017, a Richard Proenneke museum exhibit was opened at the Donnellson Public Library in Donnellson, Iowa, near Proenneke's hometown of Primrose. The exhibit features a replica of Proenneke's cabin, some of his writings, and other artifacts.

In 2016 and 2018, respectively, A life in Full Stride: The Journals of Richard L. Proenneke 1981-1985 and Your Life here is an Inspiration: The Journals of Richard L. Proenneke 1986–1991 were published. In 2020, the fifth and final collection of Proenneke's journals, Reaching the End of the Trail: The Journals of Richard L. Proenneke 1992–2000, was published. These three final collections were published by the Friends of Donnellson Public Library, the Richard Proenneke Museum, and were edited by John Branson.

Monroe Robinson, a woodworker who restored Dick's cabin and spent 19 summers there after Dick moved out, giving tours, wrote a book called The Handcrafted Life of Dick Proenneke in 2021. This book focused on the tools and hand-made creations of Dick through his journals.

Additionally, the Donnellson Public Library published, in 2024 and 2025, Dear Jake Volume I and Dear Jake Volume II. These books include letters written from Richard to his brother Raymond "Jake" Proenneke. These two volumes cover the years 1965-1984 and are believed to be the very first Journal Richard wrote at Twin Lakes.

== See also ==
- Carl McCunn, wildlife photographer who became stranded in the Alaskan wilderness and eventually committed suicide when he ran out of supplies (1981)
- Survivalism
- Velma Wallis, Native American writer who drew on her independent living experiences trapping, fishing, hunting, and gathering in rural Alaska
- Ed Wardle, documented his solo wilderness adventure in the 2009 television series Alone in the Wild
- Agafia Lykova, last survivor of the Lykov family who lived in the Russian wilderness starting in 1936, without contact with the outside world for 40 years
- National Register of Historic Places listings in Lake and Peninsula Borough, Alaska
- National Register of Historic Places listings in Lake Clark National Park and Preserve

== Bibliography ==
- Authors: Keith, Sam and Proenneke, Richard (1973, 2013), One Man's Wilderness: An Alaskan Odyssey, Alaska Northwest Books, ISBN 9780882409429.
- Author: Richard L. Proenneke, Branson, John B., ed. (2005) More Readings From One Man's Wilderness: The Journals of Richard L. Proenneke, 1974-1980, National Park Service, ISBN 9780930931780.
- Author: Richard L. Proenneke, Branson, John B., ed. (2011) The Early Years: The Journals of Richard L. Proenneke, 1967-1973, Alaska Geographic, ISBN 9780982576533.
- Author: Richard L. Proenneke, Branson, John B., ed. (2016) A Life in Full Stride: the Journals of Richard L. Proenneke, 1981-1985, Friends of Donnellson Public Library, ISBN 9780692139622. ASIN B07G1P2V5K.
- Author: Richard L. Proenneke, Branson, John B., ed. (2018) Your Life Here Is An Inspiration: the Journals of Richard L. Proenneke, 1986-1991, Friends of Donnellson Public Library, ISBN 9781643163864.
- Author: Richard L. Proenneke, Branson, John B., ed. (2020) Reaching the End of the Trail: the Journals of Richard L. Proenneke, 1992-2000, Friends of Donnellson Public Library, ISBN ?.
