= Telaquana Mountain =

Mountain in Alaska, United States

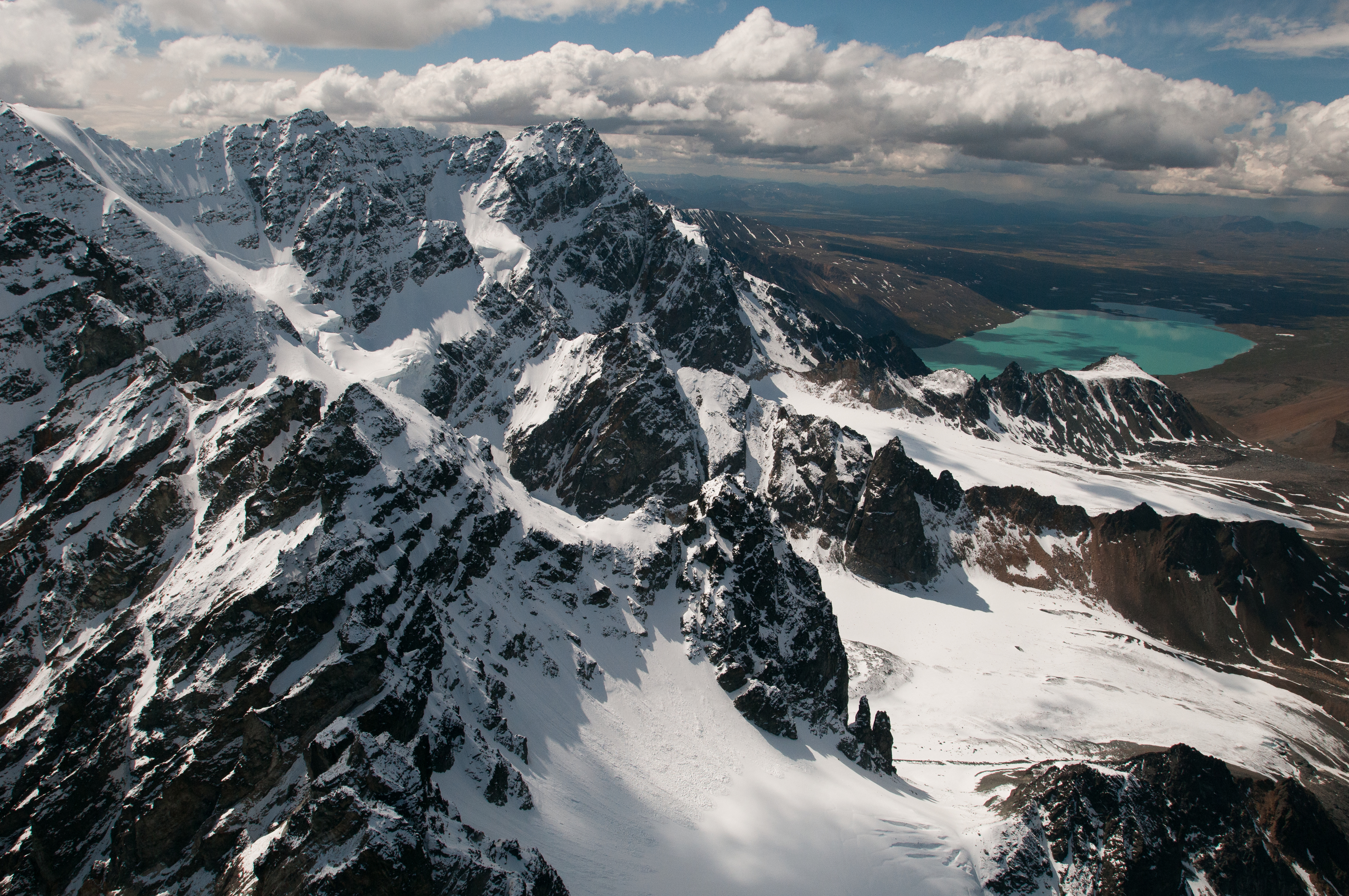
- Telaquana Mountain and Turquoise Lake

Highest point
- Elevation: 8,070 ft (2,460 m)
- Prominence: 2,585 ft (788 m)
- Isolation: 2.28 mi (3.67 km)
- Coordinates: 60°48′26″N 153°45′44″W

Geography
- Location within Alaska
- Interactive map of Telaquana Mountain
- Country: United States
- State: Alaska
- Borough: Lake and Peninsula Borough
- Protected area: Lake Clark National Park and Preserve
- Parent range: Aleutian Range; Neacola Mountains
- Topo map: USGS Lake Clark D-3

Telaquana Mountain is an 8,070-foot-elevation (2,460-meter) mountain summit in Alaska.

== Description ==
Telaquana Mountain is located 130 miles (209 km) west-southwest of Anchorage in Lake Clark National Park and Preserve. The remote glaciated mountain ranks as the third-highest peak in the Neacola Mountains which are the northernmost subrange of the Aleutian Range. Precipitation runoff and glacial meltwater from the mountain's north slope drains into Trail Creek, which is a tributary of the Telaquana River, whereas the south slope drains to the Mulchatna River. Topographic relief is significant as the summit rises 3,070 feet (936 meters) above an unnamed glacier in the north cirque in one-half mile (0.8 km). The mountain's name is associated with nearby Lake Telaquana which in the Denaʼina language means "the salmon go up that lake." The name was applied in 1928 by the U.S. Geological Survey and the toponym has been officially adopted by the United States Board on Geographic Names. The mountain holds special significance for the Denaʼina people who call the mountain Nduk'eyux Dghil'u which means "Animal goes in mountain." In their legend, all the animals on earth were released from the inside of Telaquana Mountain, such that the mountain is why wild game exists.

== Climate ==
According to the Köppen climate classification system, Telaquana Mountain is located in a tundra climate zone with cold, snowy winters, and cool summers. Weather systems coming off the North Pacific are forced upwards by the mountains (orographic lift), causing heavy precipitation in the form of rainfall and snowfall. Winter temperatures can drop below 0 °F with wind chill factors below −10 °F. This climate supports four unnamed glaciers surrounding the peak.

== See also ==
- List of mountain peaks of Alaska
- Geography of Alaska
