= Sam Keith =

American writer

Samuel Keith (September 14, 1921 — March 28, 2003) was an American writer and educator. His most notable work was the 1973 best seller One Man's Wilderness: An Alaskan Odyssey, in which he edited and expanded on the journals of his friend Richard Proenneke's solo experiences in Alaska to create an Alaskan classic. In 2014, Keith's formerly lost manuscript First Wilderness: My Quest in the Territory of Alaska was published.

Born in Plainfield, New Hampshire, in 1921, Sam Keith was the son of a wildlife artist, Merle Vincent Keith. As a teen, Keith joined the Civilian Conservation Corps and served in Elgin, Oregon, building roads. During World War II, Keith enlisted in the Marines, where he served as a radio gunner. He was shot down over the Pacific. He enrolled at Cornell University after the war on the GI Bill and graduated with a degree in English, with an eye toward being a writer. In 1953, Keith left his Massachusetts home to seek adventure in Alaska. He found a job as a laborer on the Kodiak Naval Base, and there met Richard "Dick" Proenneke, who was working as a diesel mechanic. The two became friends, and during their time in Alaska went on numerous hunting and fishing trips together. After several years, Keith returned to Massachusetts in the 1960s, where he married and became an English teacher at Silver Lake Regional High School in Kingston, writing on the side. During a trip to visit Dick Proenneke at his cabin in Twin Lakes in 1970, Keith suggested that he take Proenneke's journals describing the time he spent building a cabin on the shores of Twin Lakes, Alaska, and turn them into a book.

Keith wrote One Man's Wilderness: An Alaskan Odyssey (1973) based on his lifelong friend's journals and photography. Re-released in 1999, it became a best seller and won a National Outdoor Book Award. Book excerpts and some of Proenneke's 16mm movies were used in the popular documentary "Alone in the Wilderness", which continues to air on PBS. The two remained good friends, trading hundreds of letters over their lifetimes. The men died within a month of each other in 2003.

Ten years later, Keith's son-in-law, children's book author/illustrator Brian Lies, discovered an unpublished manuscript by Keith in an archive box in their garage. Forty years after it was written, the story of Keith's own Alaska experiences was published. Included are photos and excerpts from his journals, letters, and notebooks.
