= One Man's Wilderness =

Book

- Author: Sam Keith; Richard Proenneke
- Language: English
- Genre: Non-fiction
- Publication date: 1973
- Publication place: United States

One Man's Wilderness: An Alaskan Odyssey is a book, first published in 1973, by Sam Keith, based on the journals and photography of Richard Proenneke who, in 1968, retreated to the wilderness of Twin Lakes in Lake Clark National Park, Alaska to build a home for himself and live alone in the wilderness. Proenneke says he turned his back on tedious 50-hour work weeks and moved to Alaska "to do a thing to completion." He built the cabin when he was 51 years old and lived there for more than 30 years.

A 26th anniversary edition was published in 1999. It won that year's National Outdoor Book Award in the History/Biography category.

== Editions ==
- Keith, Sam and Proenneke, Richard. One Man's Wilderness: An Alaskan Odyssey. Alaska Northwest Books; 26th Anniv edition (May 1, 1999). ISBN 978-0-88240-513-1.
