= Chigmit Mountains =

Subrange of the Aleutian range in Alaska, U.S.

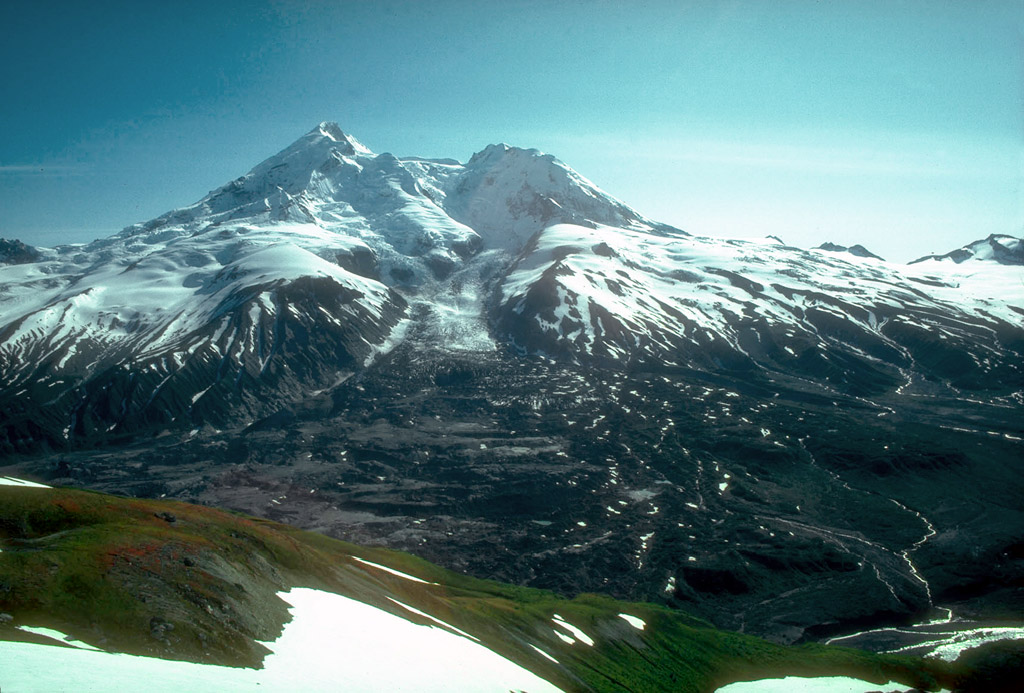
- Redoubt's north face

Highest point
- Peak: Mount Redoubt
- Elevation: 10,197 ft (3,108 m)
- Coordinates: 60°29′07″N 152°44′35″W

Dimensions
- Length: 121 mi (195 km) N-S
- Width: 116 mi (187 km) East-West

Geography
- Location within Alaska
- Country: United States
- State: Alaska
- Range coordinates: 60°10′N 153°35′W
- Parent range: Aleutian Range
- Borders on: Tordrillo Mountains and Neacola Mountains

The Chigmit Mountains are a subrange of the Aleutian Range in the Kenai Peninsula and Lake and Peninsula Boroughs of the U.S. state of Alaska.

== Location ==
They are located at the northeastern end of the Aleutian range, on the west side of Cook Inlet, roughly 120 miles (200 km) southwest of Anchorage. The closest major towns to the range are Kenai and Homer, across Cook Inlet on the west side of the Kenai Peninsula.

To the north, the Chigmits are bordered by the Tordrillo Mountains, and on the northwest, by the Neacola Mountains. Cook Inlet marks the eastern boundary of the range, while on the west, the mountains fade out into the hills and lowlands of Lake Clark National Park and Preserve. On the south and southwest, the Chigmits abut the continuation of the Aleutian Range into the Alaska Peninsula.

== Geological composition ==
The Chigmits, along with most of the Aleutian Range, are volcanic, and include two prominent stratovolcanoes, Redoubt Volcano (10,197 feet/3,108 m), the high point of the Aleutian Range; and Iliamna Volcano (10,016 feet/3,052 m).
