= Chilikadrotna River =

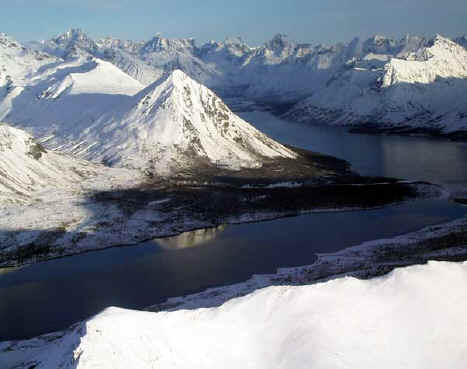
- Twin Lakes in winter

- Location of the mouth of the Chilikadrotna River in Alaska

Location
- Country: United States
- State: Alaska
- Borough: Lake and Peninsula

Physical characteristics
- Source: Twin Lakes
  - location: Lake Clark National Park and Preserve
  - coordinates: 60°39′58″N 154°02′41″W
  - elevation: 2,001 ft (610 m)
- Mouth: Mulchatna River
  - location: 46 miles (74 km) northwest of Nondalton
  - coordinates: 60°35′34″N 155°23′32″W
  - elevation: 850 ft (260 m)
- Length: 55 mi (89 km)

National Wild and Scenic River
- Type: Wild
- Designated: December 2, 1980

The Chilikadrotna River is a 55-mile (89 km) tributary of the Mulchatna River in the U.S. state of Alaska. It begins in Lake Clark National Park and Preserve in northern Lake and Peninsula Borough and flows westward into the larger river 46 miles (74 km) northwest of Nondalton.

In 1980, the upper 11 miles (18 km) of the river became part of the National Wild and Scenic Rivers System. This segment, rated "wild", lies within the national park.

== Recreation ==
During the months from June to September, the river is generally floatable in 10-to-13-foot (3 to 4 m) rafts or in kayaks by boaters with the necessary skills. Much of the Chilikadrotna River is rated Class II (medium) on the International Scale of River Difficulty, though a stretch about 5 miles (8 km) below the confluence with the Little Mulchatna River is rated Class III (difficult). The river also includes some Class I (easy) water. Dangers include overhanging vegetation, logjams, swift current, and a narrow winding course.

Floatfishing is popular on this river, although Alaska Fishing warns that this is "not a river for inexperienced boaters." There are no formal campgrounds or other accommodations along the river. Game fish on the Chilikadrotna include silver salmon, Arctic grayling, char, rainbow trout, and lake trout.

== See also ==
- List of rivers of Alaska
