= Mount Iliamna =

Stratovolcano in Alaska, United States

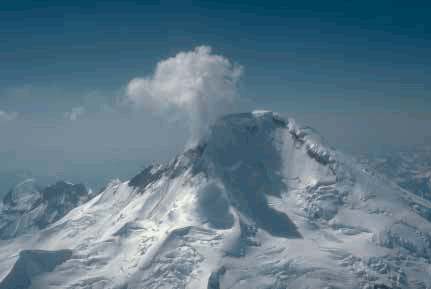
- View of the glaciated north flank of Iliamna Volcano. A plume of steam and gas typically rises several hundred meters above the fumarole field.

Highest point
- Elevation: 10,016 ft (3,053 m)
- Prominence: 7,867 ft (2,398 m)
- Listing: North America prominent 44th
- Coordinates: 60°01′54″N 153°05′28″W

Naming
- Native name: Ch’naqał’in (Denaʼina)

Geography
- Location within Alaska
- Interactive map of Mount Iliamna
- Location: Lake Clark National Park and Preserve
- Country: United States
- State: Alaska
- Region: Kenai Peninsula Borough
- Parent range: Chigmit Mountains, Aleutian Range
- Topo map: USGS Lake Clark A-1

Geology
- Formed by: Subduction zone volcanism
- Mountain type: Stratovolcano
- Volcanic arc: Aleutian Arc
- Last eruption: 1876

Climbing
- First ascent: 1959

U.S. National Natural Landmark
- Designated: 1976

Iliamna Volcano, or Mount Iliamna (Dena'ina: Ch’naqał’in; Alutiiq: Puyulek), is a glacier-covered stratovolcano in the largely volcanic Aleutian Range in southwest Alaska. Located in the Chigmit Mountain subrange in Lake Clark National Park and Preserve, the 10,016-foot (3,053 m) volcano lies approximately 134 miles (215 km) southwest of Anchorage on the west side of lower Cook Inlet. It is the 25th most prominent peak in the United States.

The volcano's glaciers have extensively altered its profile, cutting, deep and creating steep cliffs and cirques. A ridge extends 5 kilometres (3.1 mi) south from the main body of the mountain, with North Twin and South Twin peaks along its length. There is no summit crater, only a zone of fumaroles just south of the summit at the top of large collapse zone at the head of Red Glacier, which exposes a cross section of the mountain.

Holocene eruptive activity from Iliamna is little known, but radiocarbon dating seems to indicate at least a few eruptions, all before the European settlement of Alaska. Prehistoric eruptions have been dated to 5050 and 2050 BCE (VEI-4), 450 BCE and 1650. Historically observed eruptions took place in 1867 (VEI-2) and 1876 (VEI-3), with unconfirmed eruptions in 1933, 1947, 1952 and 1953. Fumaroles located at about 8,990 feet (2,740 m) elevation on the eastern flank produce nearly constant plumes of steam and minor amounts of sulfurous gases. These plumes are quite vigorous and have resulted in numerous pilot reports and early historical accounts of "eruptions" at Iliamna Volcano. Earthquake swarms and elevated seismicity and gas emissions were reported in 1996-97 and 2011–13. Iliamna was ranked as a high-threat volcano by the U.S. Geological Survey in 2005 and 2018. The 2018 assessment ranked Iliamna as the 20th most hazardous volcano in the United States, up from 22nd, with an aviation threat score of 34 and an overall score of 115, the second highest of the "high threat" category.

Major glaciers radiate from the summit of Iliamna, including Red Glacier, Tuxedni Glacier, Lateral Glacier and Umbrella Glacier.

Iliamna was first ascended in 1959. It was designated a National Natural Landmark in 1976.

In July 2025, scientists reported vigorous seismic activity beneath Iliamna Volcano, which had been dormant for over a century. According to the Alaska Volcano Observatory (via NASA), the seismic tremors were significant enough to indicate renewed magma movement—although it was also noted that the quakes could result from an avalanche rather than an impending eruption.This marked the first notable unrest at Iliamna since the early 20th century

== Gallery ==
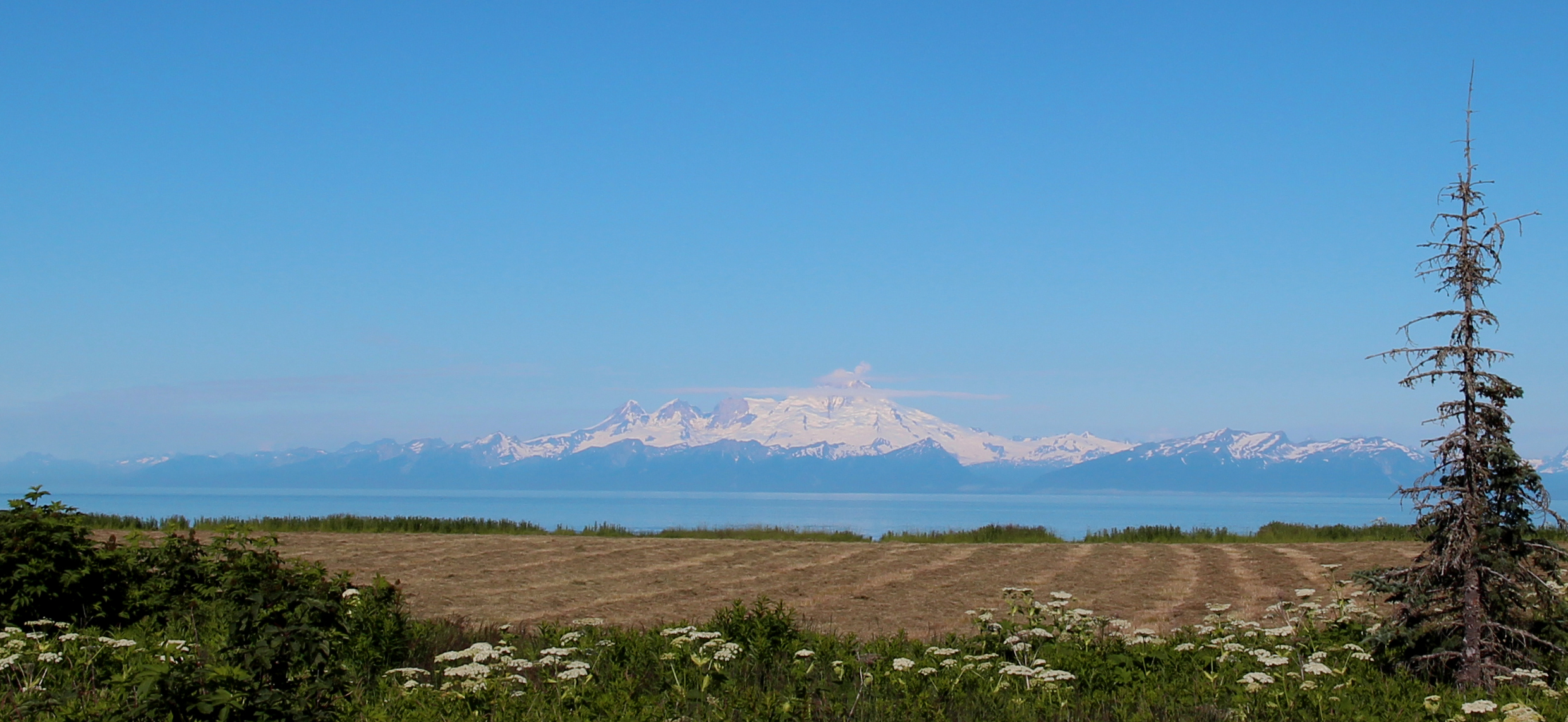
Mount Iliamna of the Aleutian Range, July 2015

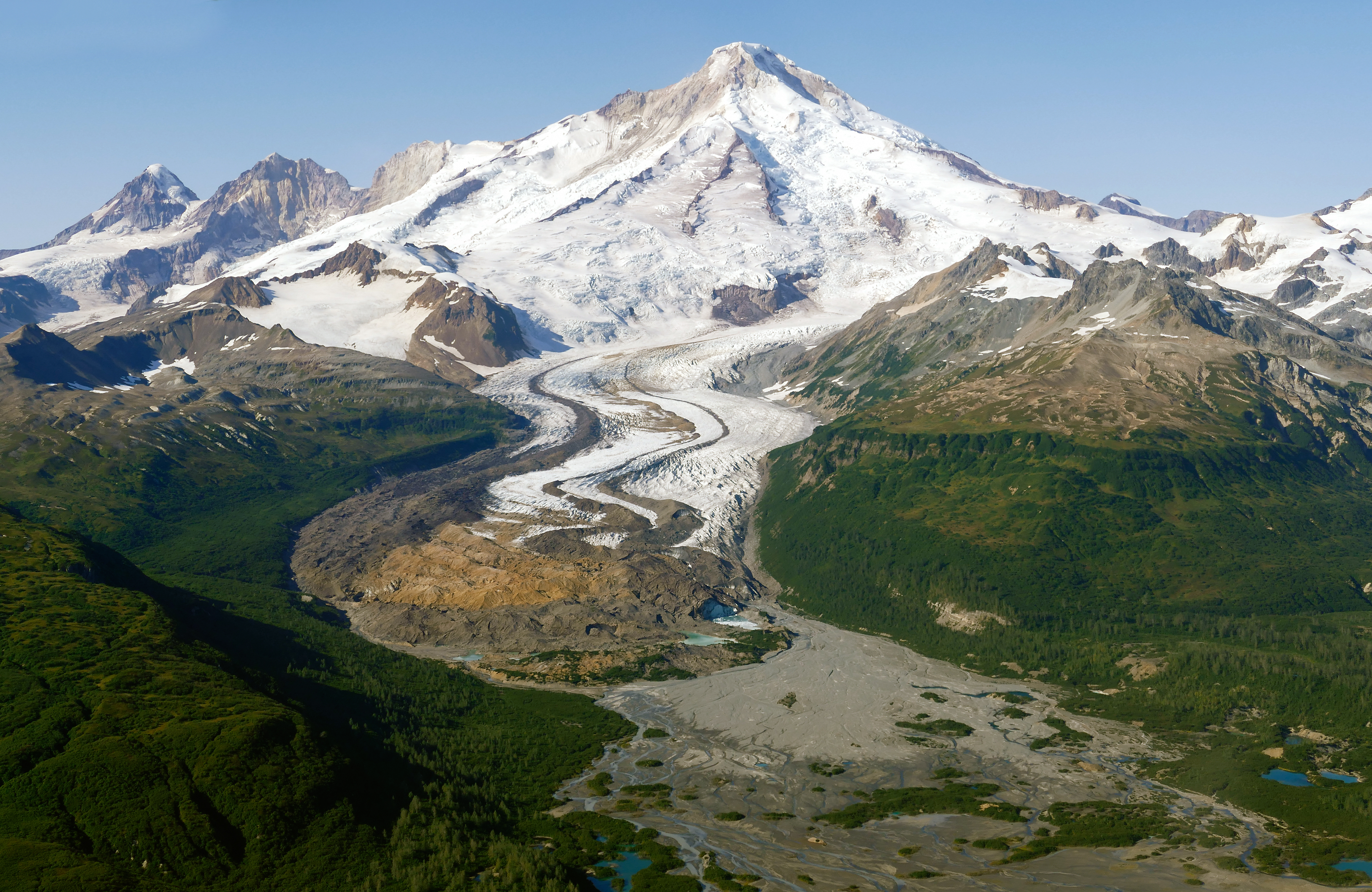
Iliamna Volcano

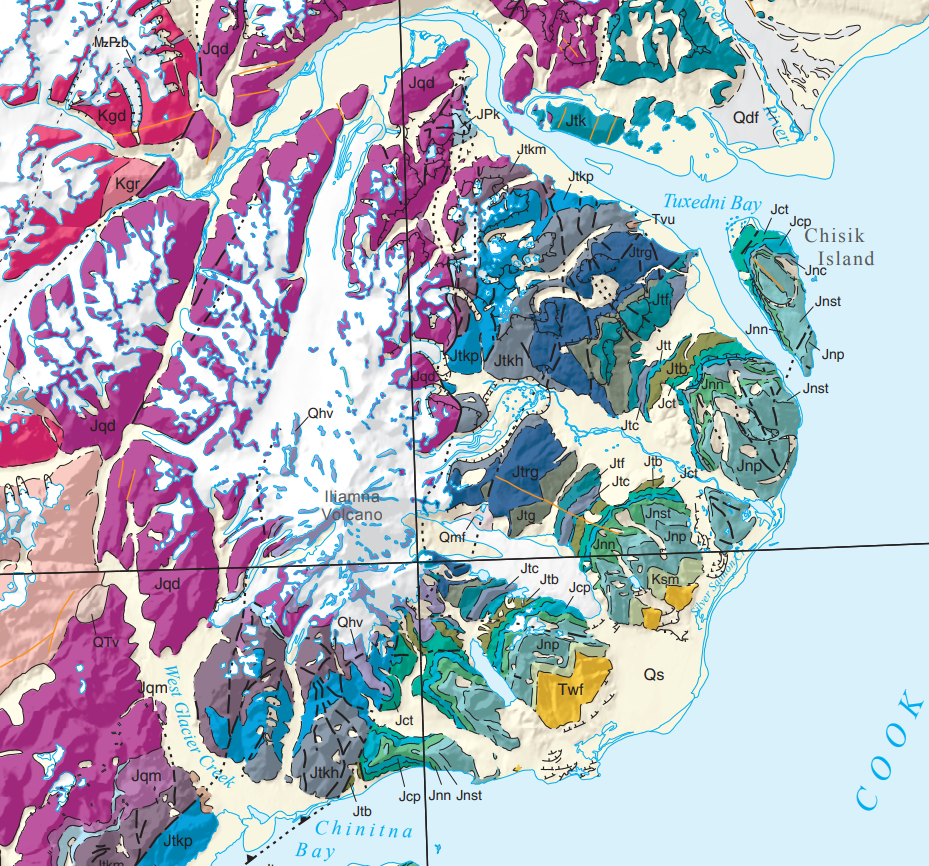
Geological map

== See also ==
- Alaska Volcano Observatory
- List of mountain peaks of North America
  - List of mountain peaks of the United States
    - List of mountain peaks of Alaska
- List of Ultras of the United States
- List of volcanoes in the United States
