= Twin Lakes (Alaska) =

Pair of lakes in Alaska, United States

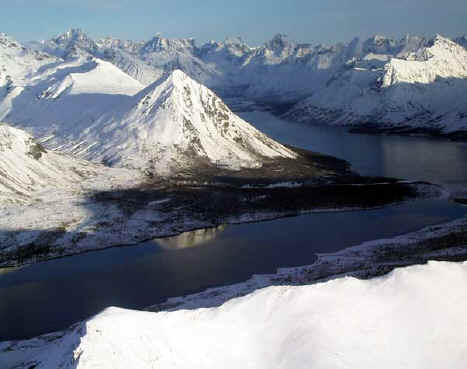

- Location within Alaska Location within North America
- Location: Lake and Peninsula Borough, Alaska
- Coordinates: 60°38′20″N 153°51′47″W
- Basin countries: United States
- Max. depth: 316 ft (96 m)

Twin Lakes is a complex of two large lakes in Lake Clark National Park in the U.S. state of Alaska, near the northeast corner of Lake and Peninsula Borough. It contains a six-mile-long (ten-kilometer) upper lake and a smaller four-mile-long (six-kilometer) lower lake, joined by a short connecting stream. The lakes outflow westward into the Chilikadrotna River (and eventually into the Mulchatna and Nushagak Rivers and Nushagak Bay). It is quite remote and unpopulated, except in the late summer as it is a popular hunting spot.

The lake complex was the retirement home of naturalist Richard Proenneke (1916–2003), who spent most (1968–1998) of the last 35 years of his life living there in a log cabin he built by hand. (See One Man's Wilderness: An Alaskan Odyssey and Alone in the Wilderness). It is only reachable by air taxi via a float or a wheel plane.

== Gallery ==
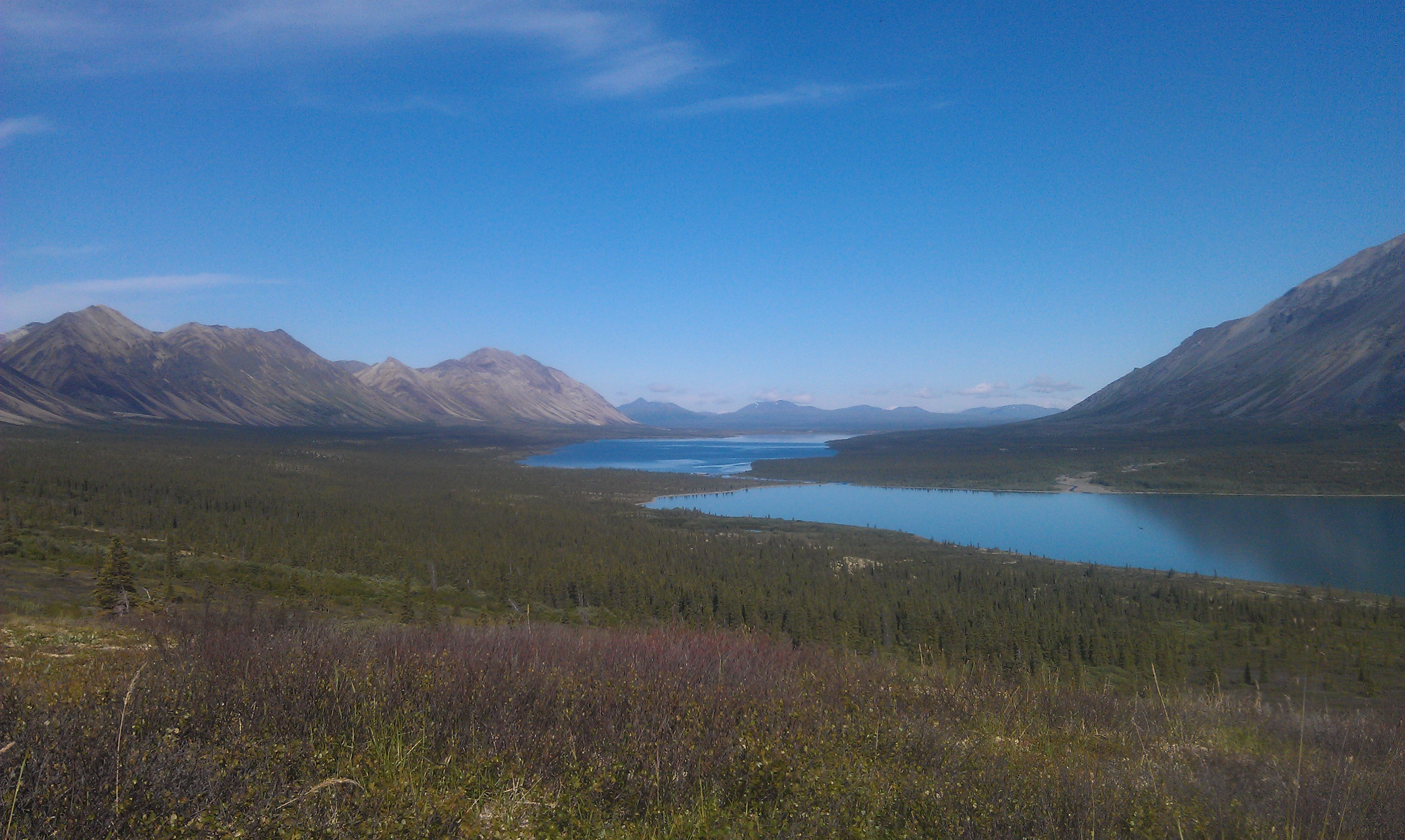
Twin Lakes from Low Pass

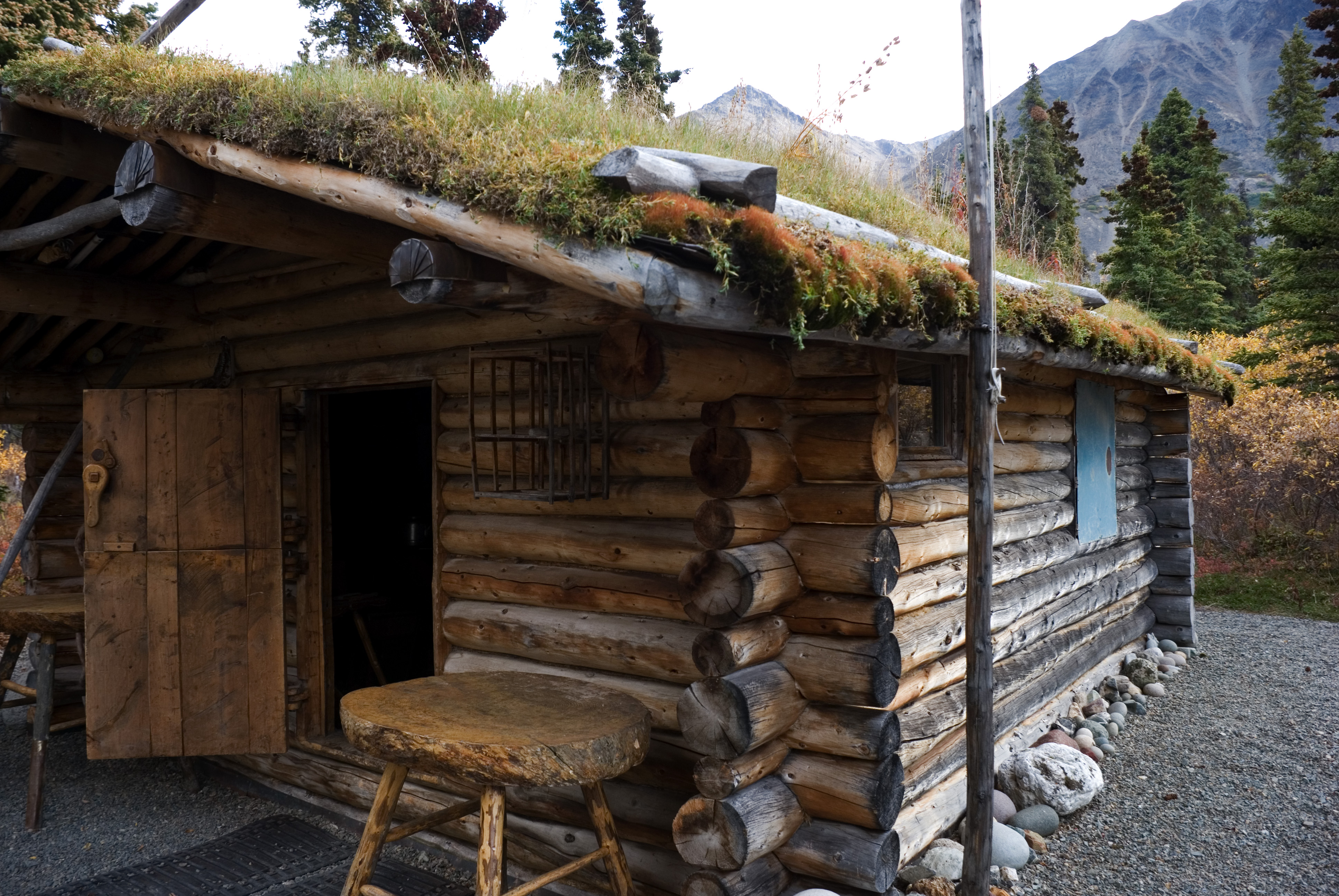
Proenneke's Cabin
