= Lake Clark (Alaska) =

Lake in the state of Alaska, United States

- Qizhjeh Vena (Denaʼina)
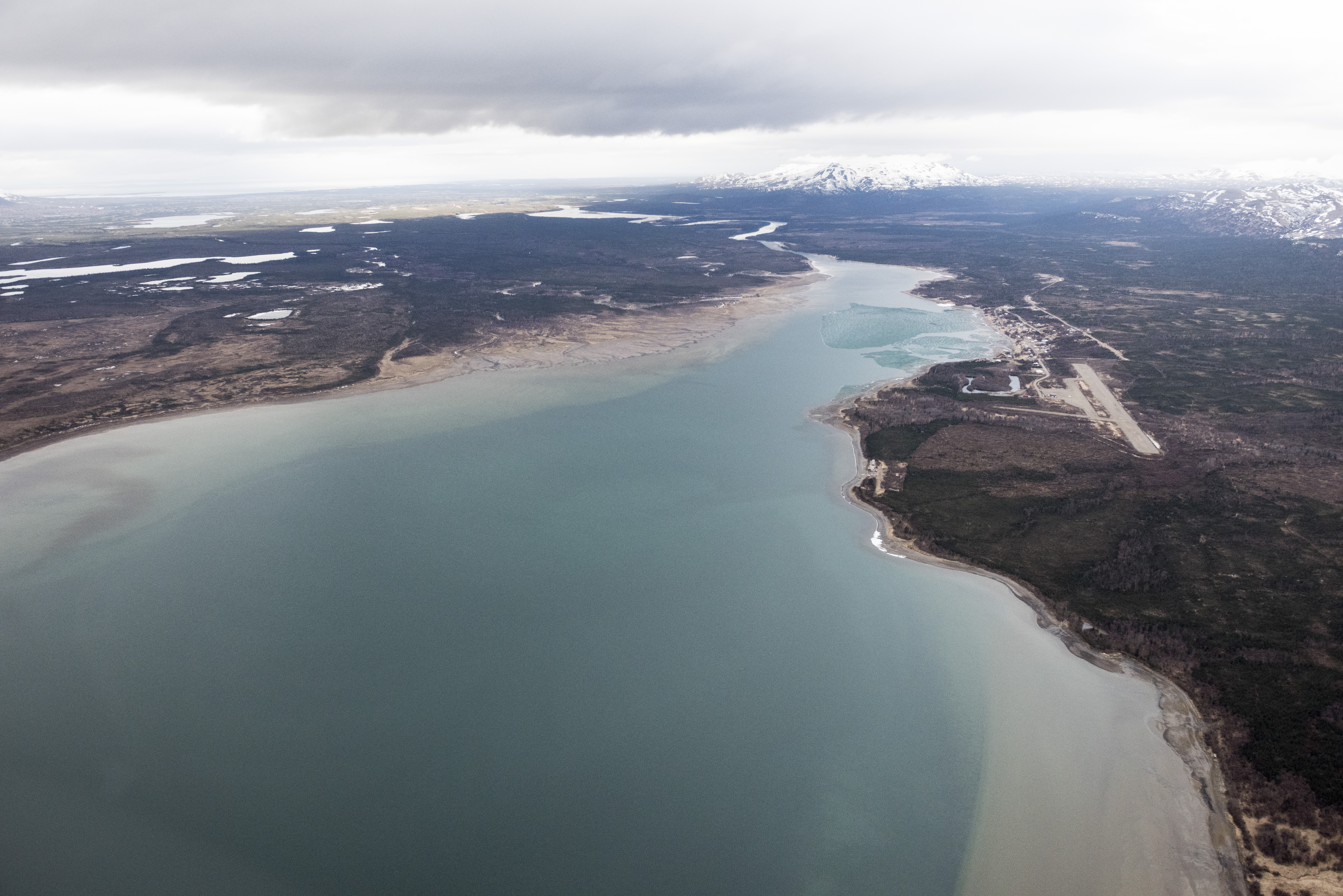
- Aerial view of Lake Clark. Nondalton, Alaska on the right.

- Location within Alaska Location within North America
- Location: Lake and Peninsula Borough, Alaska, US
- Coordinates: 60°14′39″N 154°17′07″W
- Basin countries: United States
- Max. length: 69 km (43 mi)
- Max. width: 8 km (5.0 mi)
- Max. depth: 322 m (1,056 ft)
- Surface elevation: 75 m (246 ft)

Lake Clark (Denaʼina: Qizhjeh Vena) is a lake in southwest Alaska. It drains through Six Mile Lake and the Newhalen River into Iliamna Lake. The lake is about 64 km (40 mi) long and about 8 km (5.0 mi) wide.

Lake Clark was named for John W. Clark, chief of the Nushagak trading post and the first American non-Native to see the lake, when an expedition financed by a weekly magazine reached it in February 1891. The Dena'ina Athabascan name is Qizjeh Vena which means "place where people gather lake". The lake is within Lake Clark National Park and Preserve.

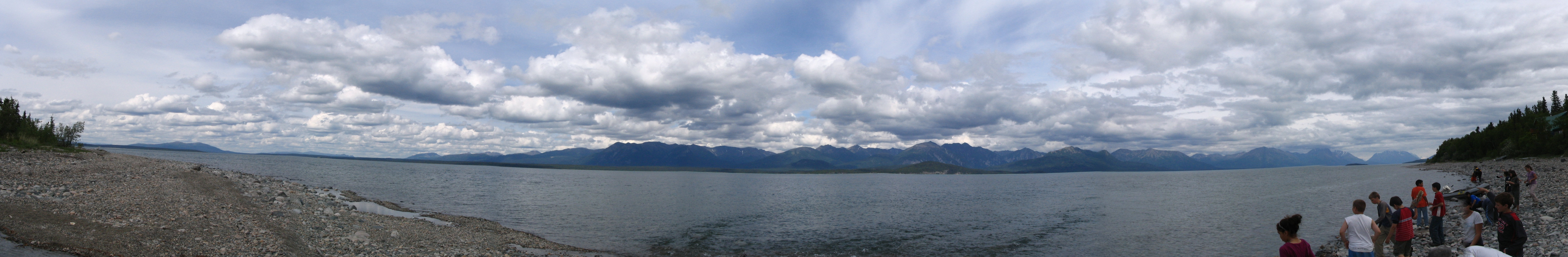
A panoramic picture taken from the bank of Lake Clark
