= Port Alsworth, Alaska =

- Census-designated place
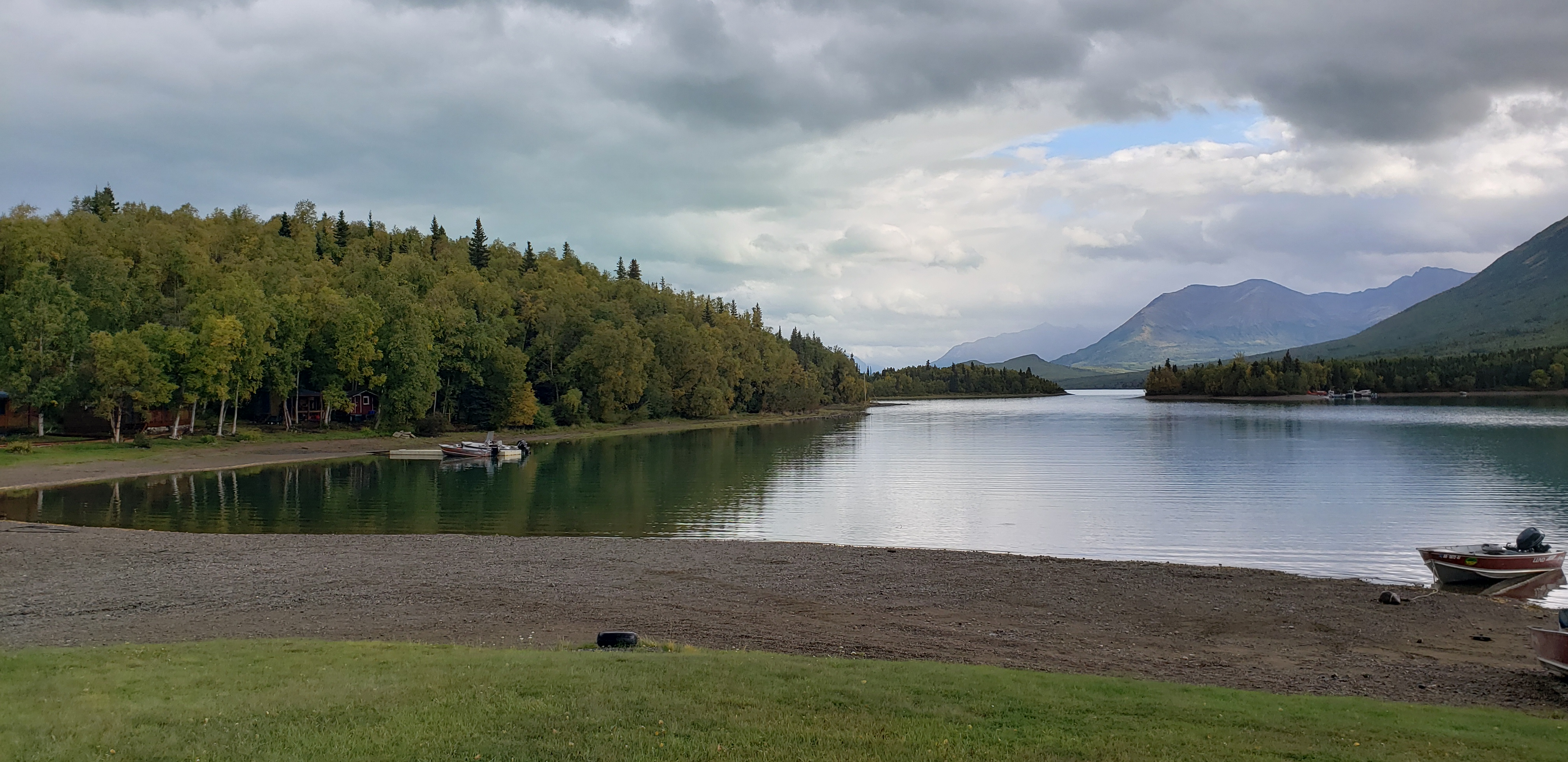
- Port Alsworth

- Location within Alaska Location within North America Location within Earth
- Coordinates: 60°12′30″N 154°18′24″W
- Country: United States
- State: Alaska
- Borough: Lake and Peninsula

Government
  - Borough mayor: Glen Alsworth, Sr.
  - State senator: Lyman Hoffman (D)
  - State rep.: Bryce Edgmon (I)

Area
  - Total: 22.71 sq mi (58.81 km^{2})
  - Land: 22.56 sq mi (58.43 km^{2})
  - Water: 0.15 sq mi (0.39 km^{2})
- Elevation: 253 ft (77 m)

Population (2020)
  - Total: 186
  - Density: 8.2/sq mi (3.18/km^{2})
- Time zone: UTC-9 (Alaska (AKST))
  - Summer (DST): UTC-8 (AKDT)
- ZIP code: 99653
- Area code: 907
- FIPS code: 02-62620
- GNIS feature ID: 1408208

Port Alsworth is a census-designated place (CDP) in Lake and Peninsula Borough, Alaska, United States. It is 165 miles (266 km) by air southwest of Anchorage. Its population was 186 at the 2020 census, up from 159 in 2010. It is the most populated community in the borough.

Port Alsworth was founded in 1950 by Babe Alsworth (1909-2004), a missionary and bush pilot, and Mary Alsworth (1923-1996), who was the town's first postmaster. Port Alsworth is located on private land within Lake Clark National Park and Preserve and is the site of the national park's field headquarters.

Samaritan's Purse operates a lodge for wounded United States military veterans located in the town for "Operation Heal Our Patriots" (OHOP). There is a summer camp there called "Tanalian Bible Camp" where youth, ages 8–19, from the surrounding villages can attend. From the summer of 2013 to the spring of 2014, the local Tanalian School underwent renovation and a dearly needed expansion. The renovation tripled school square footage, bought new furniture, and doubled the size of the gym. Lake Clark Resort, a private resort in Port Alsworth, operates The Farm Lodge, which is open from June to October (depending on weather conditions).

== Geography ==
Port Alsworth is located in northern Lake and Peninsula Borough at 60°12′30″N 154°18′24″W (60.208281, -154.306586). It sits on the south shore of Lake Clark at the mouth of the Tanalian River. According to the United States Census Bureau, the CDP has a total area of 22.7 square miles (58.8 km^{2}), of which 22.64 square miles (58.65 km^{2}) are land and 0.06 square miles (0.16 km^{2}), or 0.27%, are water.

== Climate ==
Port Alsworth has a subarctic climate (Köppen Dfc).

Climate data for Port Alsworth, Alaska, 1991–2020 normals, extremes 1960–present
Month	Jan	Feb	Mar	Apr	May	Jun	Jul	Aug	Sep	Oct	Nov	Dec	Year
Record high °F (°C)	58 (14)	55 (13)	59 (15)	70 (21)	85 (29)	90 (32)	91 (33)	87 (31)	77 (25)	66 (19)	56 (13)	53 (12)	91 (33)
Mean maximum °F (°C)	45.3 (7.4)	45.8 (7.7)	47.8 (8.8)	58.1 (14.5)	71.6 (22.0)	78.3 (25.7)	80.4 (26.9)	76.7 (24.8)	66.4 (19.1)	56.6 (13.7)	46.8 (8.2)	45.0 (7.2)	82.3 (27.9)
Mean daily maximum °F (°C)	24.0 (−4.4)	30.2 (−1.0)	34.9 (1.6)	47.3 (8.5)	58.6 (14.8)	66.8 (19.3)	69.1 (20.6)	66.0 (18.9)	57.1 (13.9)	44.3 (6.8)	32.2 (0.1)	26.6 (−3.0)	46.4 (8.0)
Daily mean °F (°C)	16.8 (−8.4)	22.5 (−5.3)	25.1 (−3.8)	38.5 (3.6)	48.6 (9.2)	56.7 (13.7)	60.4 (15.8)	57.7 (14.3)	49.7 (9.8)	38.1 (3.4)	26.7 (−2.9)	20.7 (−6.3)	38.4 (3.6)
Mean daily minimum °F (°C)	9.5 (−12.5)	14.8 (−9.6)	15.4 (−9.2)	29.7 (−1.3)	38.6 (3.7)	46.6 (8.1)	51.6 (10.9)	49.3 (9.6)	42.3 (5.7)	31.9 (−0.1)	21.2 (−6.0)	14.7 (−9.6)	30.5 (−0.8)
Mean minimum °F (°C)	−23.2 (−30.7)	−19.7 (−28.7)	−11.8 (−24.3)	8.0 (−13.3)	27.2 (−2.7)	36.6 (2.6)	43.4 (6.3)	37.0 (2.8)	27.8 (−2.3)	14.1 (−9.9)	−2.1 (−18.9)	−13.3 (−25.2)	−30.1 (−34.5)
Record low °F (°C)	−53 (−47)	−55 (−48)	−50 (−46)	−18 (−28)	13 (−11)	20 (−7)	25 (−4)	22 (−6)	13 (−11)	−7 (−22)	−24 (−31)	−48 (−44)	−55 (−48)
Average precipitation inches (mm)	0.70 (18)	0.85 (22)	0.63 (16)	0.50 (13)	0.43 (11)	0.73 (19)	1.35 (34)	1.70 (43)	2.57 (65)	1.32 (34)	1.31 (33)	0.98 (25)	13.07 (332)
Average snowfall inches (cm)	13.9 (35)	13.1 (33)	12.1 (31)	7.2 (18)	0.8 (2.0)	0.0 (0.0)	0.0 (0.0)	0.0 (0.0)	0.3 (0.76)	4.9 (12)	17.3 (44)	18.3 (46)	87.9 (223)
Average precipitation days (≥ 0.01 in)	7.7	7.2	6.2	5.2	4.0	5.8	8.5	10.8	10.6	8.8	10.4	10.2	95.4
Average snowy days (≥ 0.1 in)	6.2	5.7	5.3	3.1	0.3	0.0	0.0	0.0	0.1	2.6	7.1	8.4	38.8
Source: NOAA

== Demographics ==
Historical population
Census	Pop.	Note	%±
1940	18		—
1960	34		—
1990	55		—
2000	104		89.1%
2010	159		52.9%
2020	186		17.0%
U.S. Decennial Census

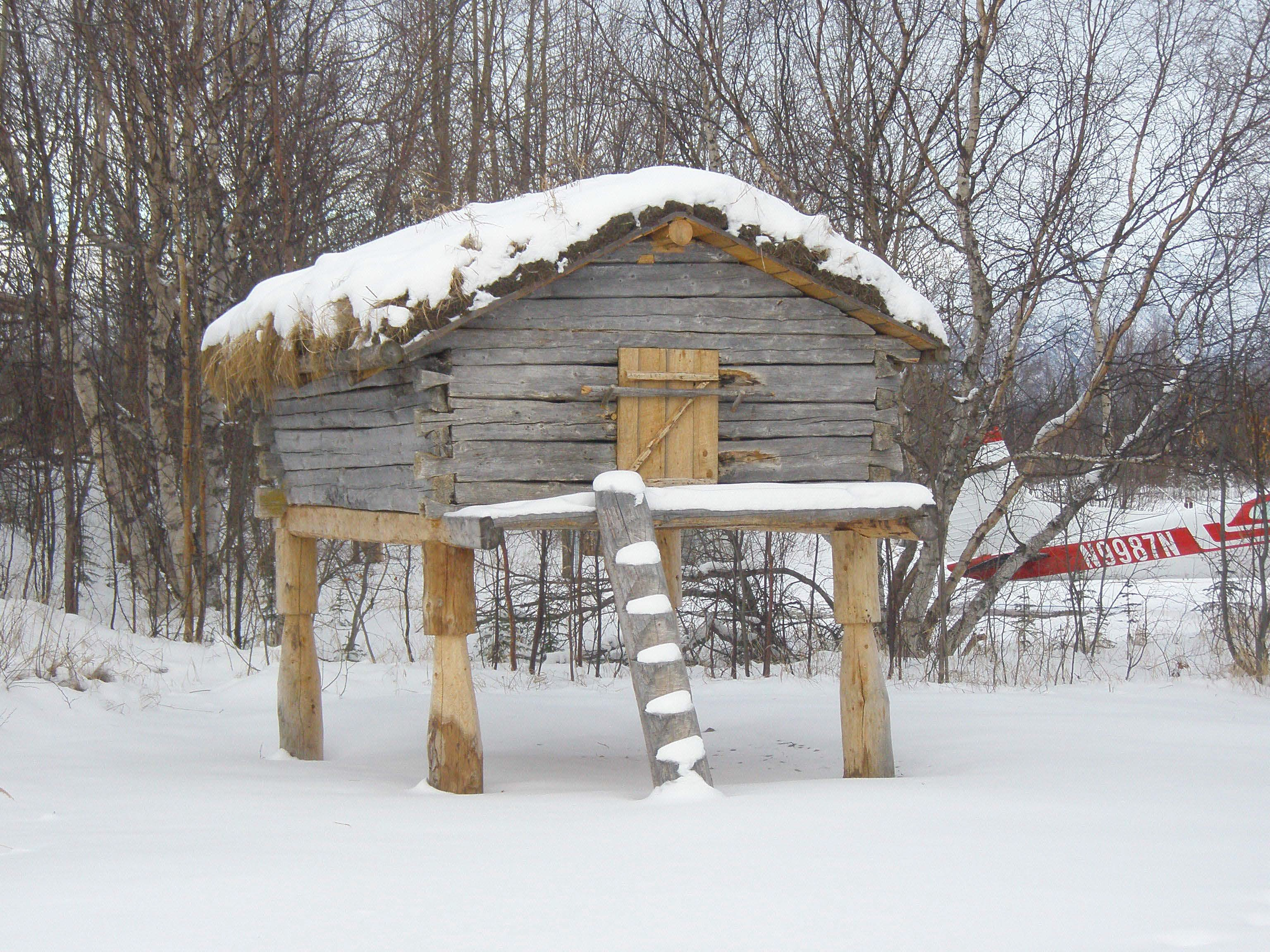
The historic Trefon Dena'ina Fish Cache in Port Alsworth

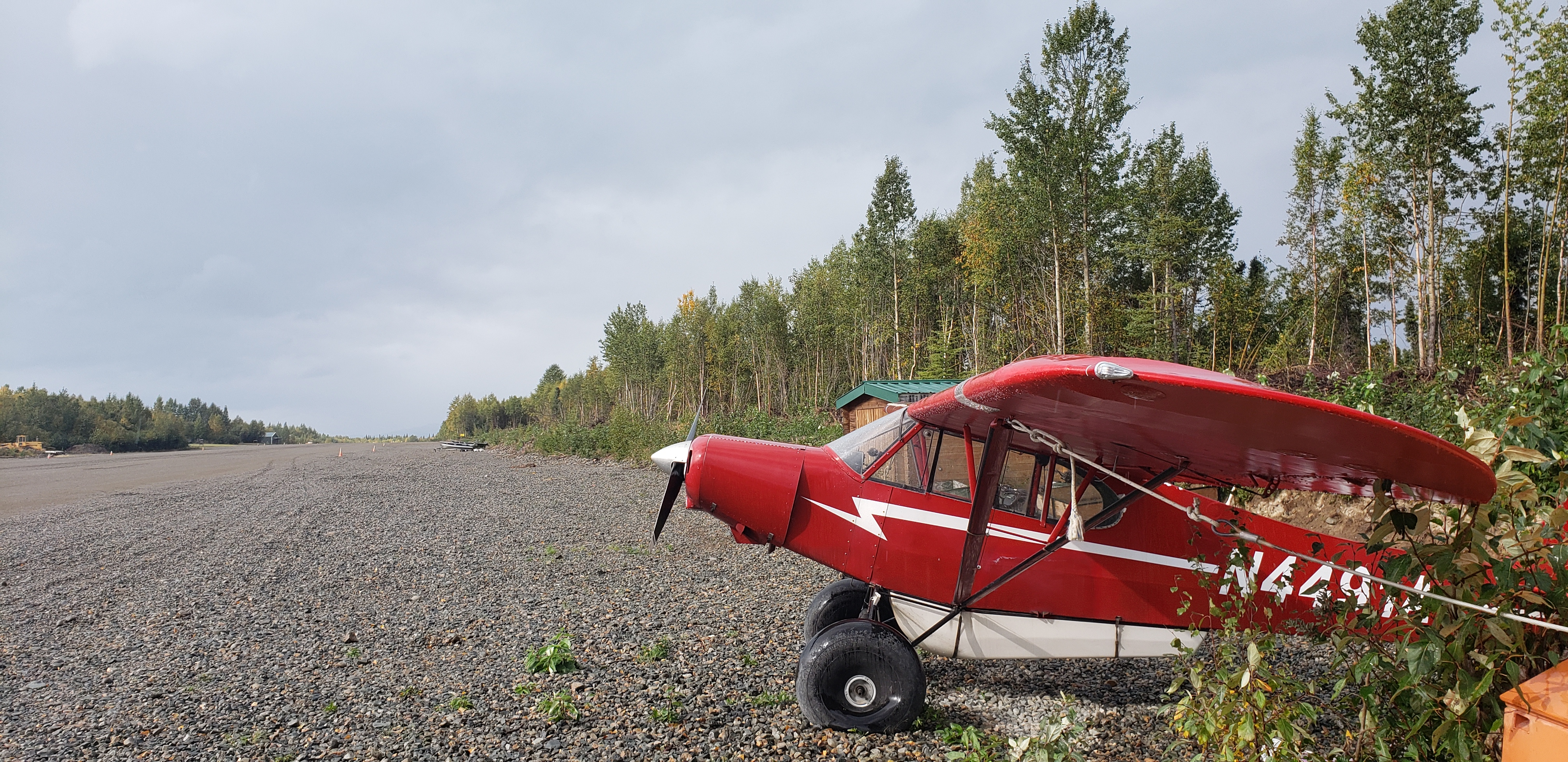
Wilder/Natwick LLC airport

Port Alsworth first appeared on the 1940 U.S. Census as the unincorporated village of "Tanalian Point". It next appeared on the 1960 census with its present name of Port Alsworth. It did not reappear again until 1990, when it was named a census-designated place (CDP).

As of the census of 2000 there were 104 people, 34 households, and 24 families residing in the CDP. The population density was 4.6 inhabitants per square mile (1.8/km^{2}). There were 70 housing units at an average density of 3.1 per square mile (1.2/km^{2}). The racial makeup of the CDP was 77.88% White, 4.81% Native American, and 17.31% from two or more races. There were 34 households, out of which 47.1% had children under the age of 18 living with them, 67.6% were married couples living together, 2.9% had a female householder with no husband present, and 26.5% were non-families. 23.5% of all households were made up of individuals, and none had someone living alone who was 65 years of age or older. The average household size was 3.06 and the average family size was 3.64.

In the CDP, the population was spread out, with 41.3% under the age of 18, 7.7% from 18 to 24, 28.8% from 25 to 44, 18.3% from 45 to 64, and 3.8% who were 65 years of age or older. The median age was 26 years. For every 100 females, there were 85.7 males. For every 100 females age 18 and over, there were 84.8 males. The median income for a household in the CDP was $58,750.00, and the median income for a family was $62,083. Males had a median income of $50,417 versus $17,083 for females. The per capita income for the CDP was $21,716. There were no families and 6.0% of the population lived below the poverty line; of those no one was under eighteen and none over 64.

== Transportation ==
Air taxis serve the private Port Alsworth Airport and the public Wilder/Natwick LLC Airport.
