= Lake Clark National Park and Preserve =

National park in Alaska, United States

- IUCN category V (protected landscape/seascape)
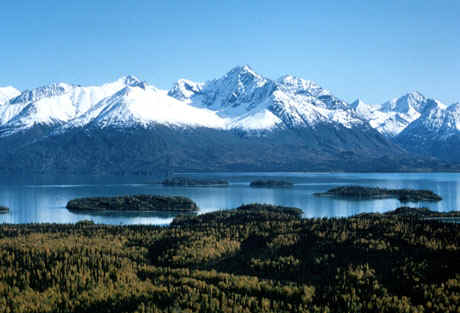
- Lake Clark and the Chigmit Mountains

- Location within Alaska Location within North America
- Interactive map of Lake Clark National Park and Preserve
- Location: Lake and Peninsula Borough, Kenai Peninsula Borough, Bethel Census Area, and Matanuska-Susitna Borough, Alaska, USA
- Nearest city: Anchorage
- Coordinates: 60°58′N 153°25′W
- Area: 4,030,015 acres (16,308.89 km^{2})
- Established: December 2, 1980
- Visitors: 19,778 (in 2025)
- Governing body: National Park Service
- Website: nps.gov/lacl

Lake Clark National Park and Preserve is a United States national park and preserve in southwest Alaska, about 100 miles (160 km) southwest of Anchorage. The park was first proclaimed a national monument in 1978, then established as a national park and preserve in 1980 by the Alaska National Interest Lands Conservation Act. The park includes many streams and lakes vital to the Bristol Bay salmon fishery, including its namesake Lake Clark. A wide variety of recreational activities may be pursued in the park and preserve year-round. The park protects rainforests along the coastline of Cook Inlet, alpine tundra, glaciers, glacial lakes, major salmon-bearing rivers, and two volcanoes, Mount Redoubt and Mount Iliamna. Mount Redoubt is active, erupting in 1989 and 2009. The wide variety of ecosystems in the park mean that virtually all major Alaskan animals, terrestrial and marine, may be seen in and around the park. Salmon, particularly sockeye salmon, play a major role in the ecosystem and the local economy. Large populations of brown bears are attracted to feed on the spawning salmon in the Kijik River and at Silver Salmon Creek. Bear watching is a common activity in the park.

No roads lead to the park, which can only be reached by boat or small aircraft, typically floatplanes. The major settled area in the park and preserve is Port Alsworth on Lake Clark. Five other settlements are near the park, populated mainly by Dena'ina natives. Prior to the park's establishment, isolated cabins were scattered around the region, the most well-known belonging to Richard Proenneke, whose films documenting his solitary life at Twin Lakes were made into Alone in the Wilderness in 2003.

Lake Clark was proclaimed a national monument by President Jimmy Carter using the Antiquities Act on December 1, 1978. Lake Clark's status was changed to national park and preserve in 1980 by Congress, and about two-thirds was designated wilderness. While both sport and subsistence hunting are permitted in the national preserve lands, only subsistence hunting by local residents is permitted within the national park.

== Geography ==
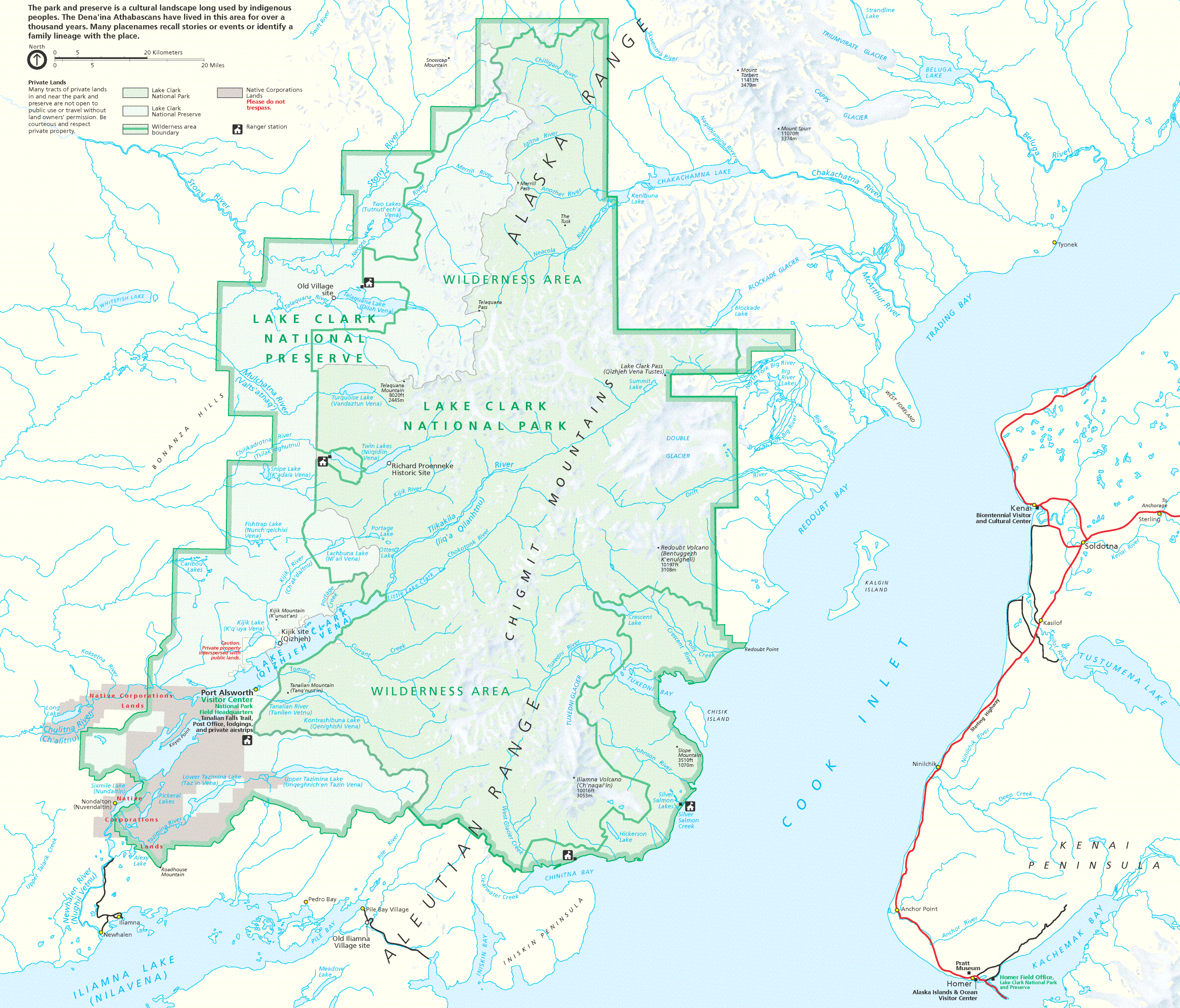
Map of Lake Clark National Park. Also see resolution adjustable map

Lake Clark National Park and Preserve covers 4,030,015 acres (1,630,889 ha) at the base of the Alaska Peninsula in southcentral Alaska, about 100 miles (160 km) southwest of Anchorage. The national park and associated national preserve extend from the Cook Inlet across the Chigmit Mountains and the Neacola Mountains, on the northern end of the Aleutian Range, and on into the Alaska interior. Of the total area, about 2,637,000 acres (1,067,000 ha) lie in the park and 1,400,000 acres (570,000 ha) in the preserve. Lake Clark is the largest lake in the park, on the southwest corner of the park. The national preserve lands adjoin park lands on the west, offering both subsistence and sport hunting, in contrast to parklands, where only subsistence hunting by local residents is allowed. The extreme southwest section of the preserve includes Alaskan Native corporation lands, which are not open to the public. Most of the park section is designated as wilderness. The eastern part of the park near the Cook Inlet includes two active volcanoes, Mount Redoubt and Mount Iliamna. A third, Mount Spurr, is just outside the park to the east. The chief river in the park is the Kvichak River. Another large river, the Tlikakila River, runs across the park from its source at Summit Lake to Lake Clark, emerging from the lake and the park as the Newhalen River.

The park is not accessible by roads. Access is solely by air taxi or by boat along the Cook Inlet coast and Lake Clark. Since much of the movement in the area is by air, the mountains present a significant barrier to air traffic. Lake Clark Pass, at 1,050 feet (320 m) provides a way through the mountains by air at low elevation, and is the main route between Anchorage and western Alaska.

The main inhabited place in the park is Port Alsworth on Lake Clark, with a Park Service visitor center and a number of privately operated lodges. Air taxis make regular trips between Port Alsworth and outside communities. Other private lodges are scattered around the park.

== Geology ==
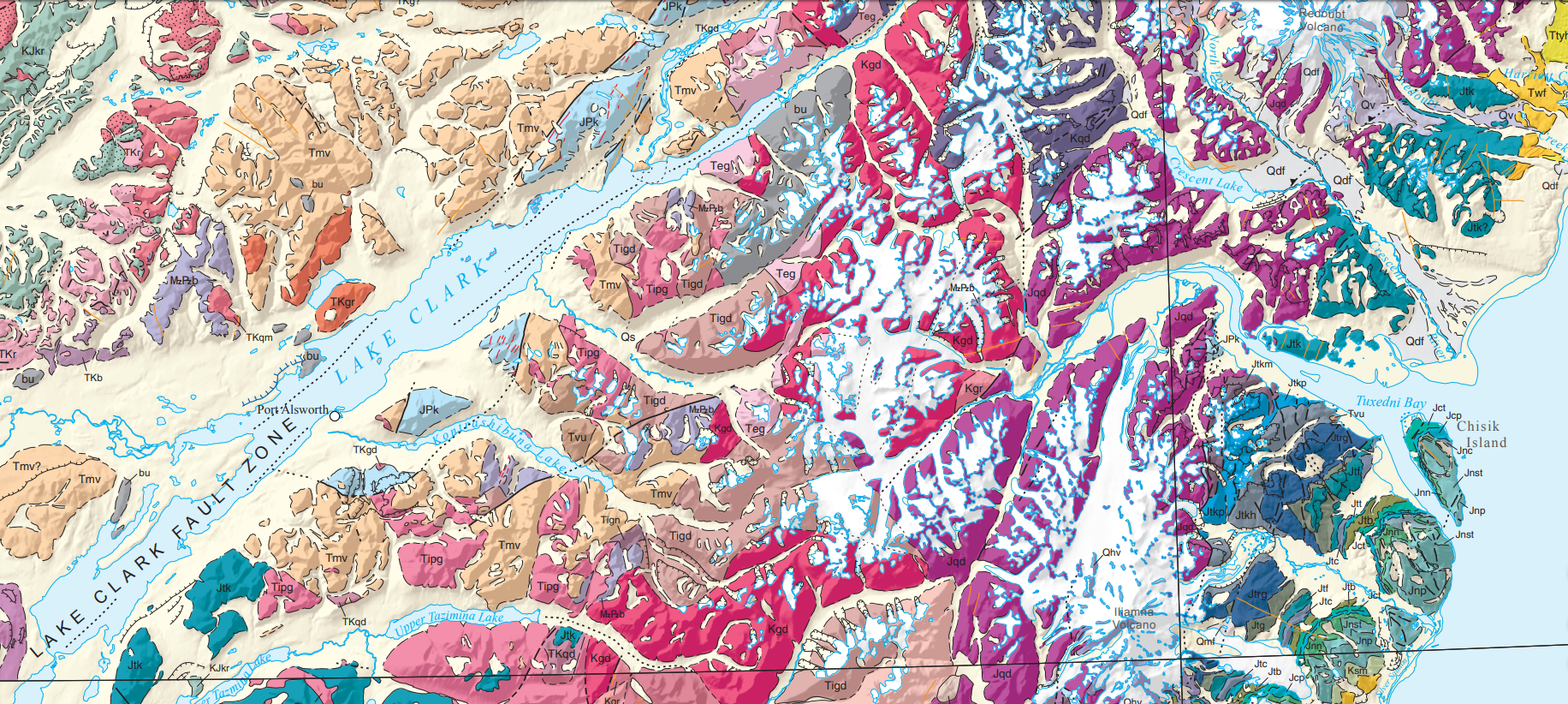
Lake Clark National Park geological map

The park has four main physiographic regions. The upthrust granite Chigmit Mountains connect the Alaska Range to the Aleutian Range. Superimposed on these mountains and little to the east of the main range are the two stratovolcanoes, Redoubt 10,197 feet (3,108 m) high, and Iliamna at 10,016 feet (3,053 m). Glaciers have altered the mountains, carving cirques and U-shaped valleys into the range, which end abruptly on the east at the steep coast in deep bays or in outwash flats. On the west the glaciers have cut deeply enough to create lakes, dammed by terminal moraines at their downstream ends. Lake Clark, the largest, is the sixth largest lake in Alaska, 860 feet (260 m) deep and 42 miles (68 km) long.

The park includes a variety of unrelated rocks. The core of the Chigmit Mountains is a granite pluton forced upwards by the collision of the Pacific Plate and the North American Plate. Rocks in coastal areas are sedimentary in origin, and contain abundant fossils. Volcanic rocks intrude through these native rocks.

=== Volcanoes ===
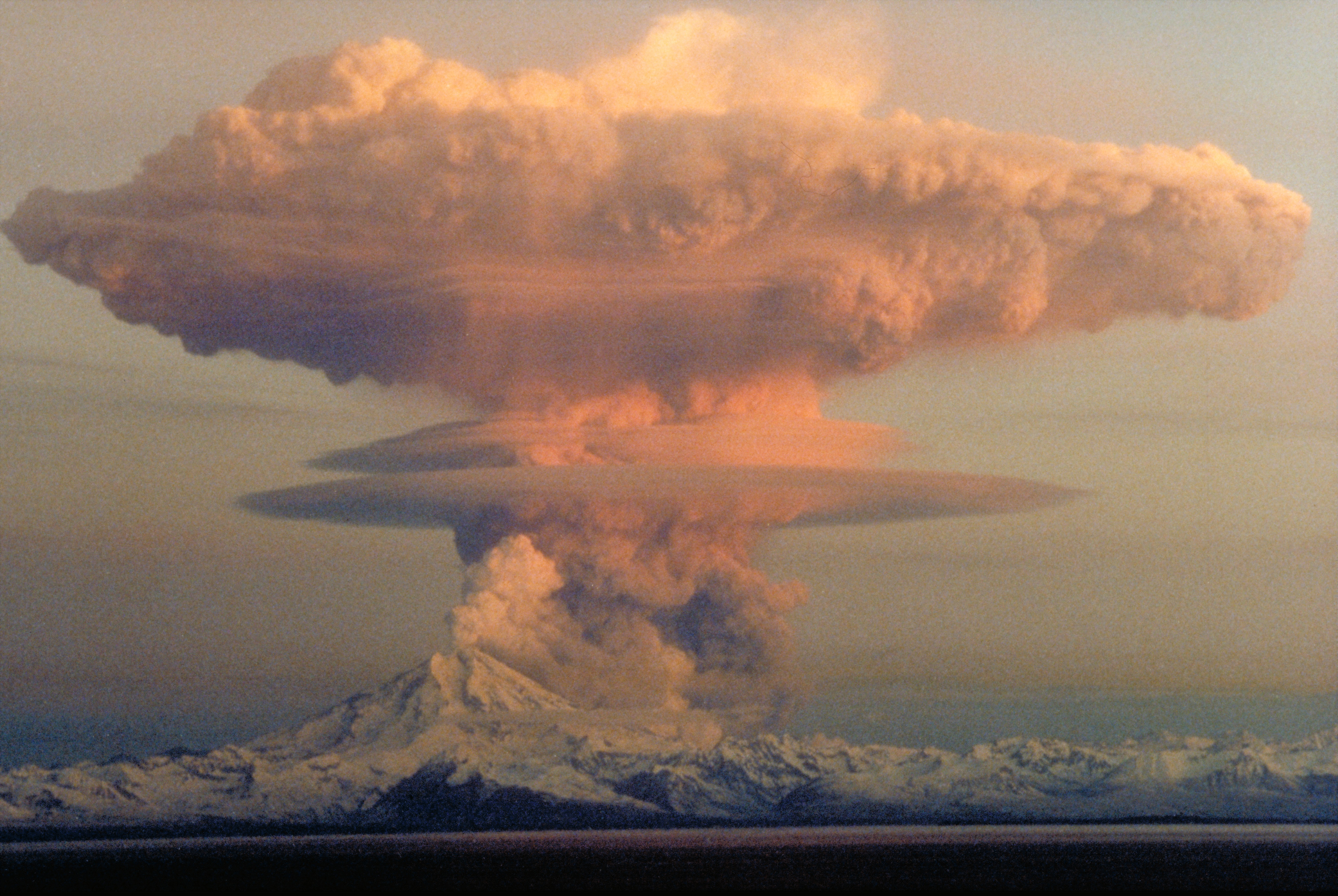
Redoubt volcano in eruption

Redoubt is the park's active volcano. 10,197 feet (3,108 m) high, about 10 kilometres (6.2 mi) in diameter and with a volume of about 30 to 35 cubic kilometers, the stratovolcano rises through the Chigmit batholith. It has a 1.8-kilometre-wide (1.1 mi) summit crater. The Drift Glacier originates there and flows through a gap in the rim. Redoubt's most recent active phase began on December 14, 1989, with ash eruptions. The ash clouds affected air traffic, causing all four engines to fail on KLM Flight 867 when it passed overhead at 25,000 feet (7,600 m). The 747 was able to safely return to Anchorage. Four other airplanes were damaged in the same event, which brought greater awareness of the hazards associated with high-altitude volcanic ash. Redoubt was quiet after 1990 until March and April 2009 when it erupted with pyroclastic flows that melted ice, creating lahars on the Drift River, endangering the Drift River Terminal Facility to the east of the park.

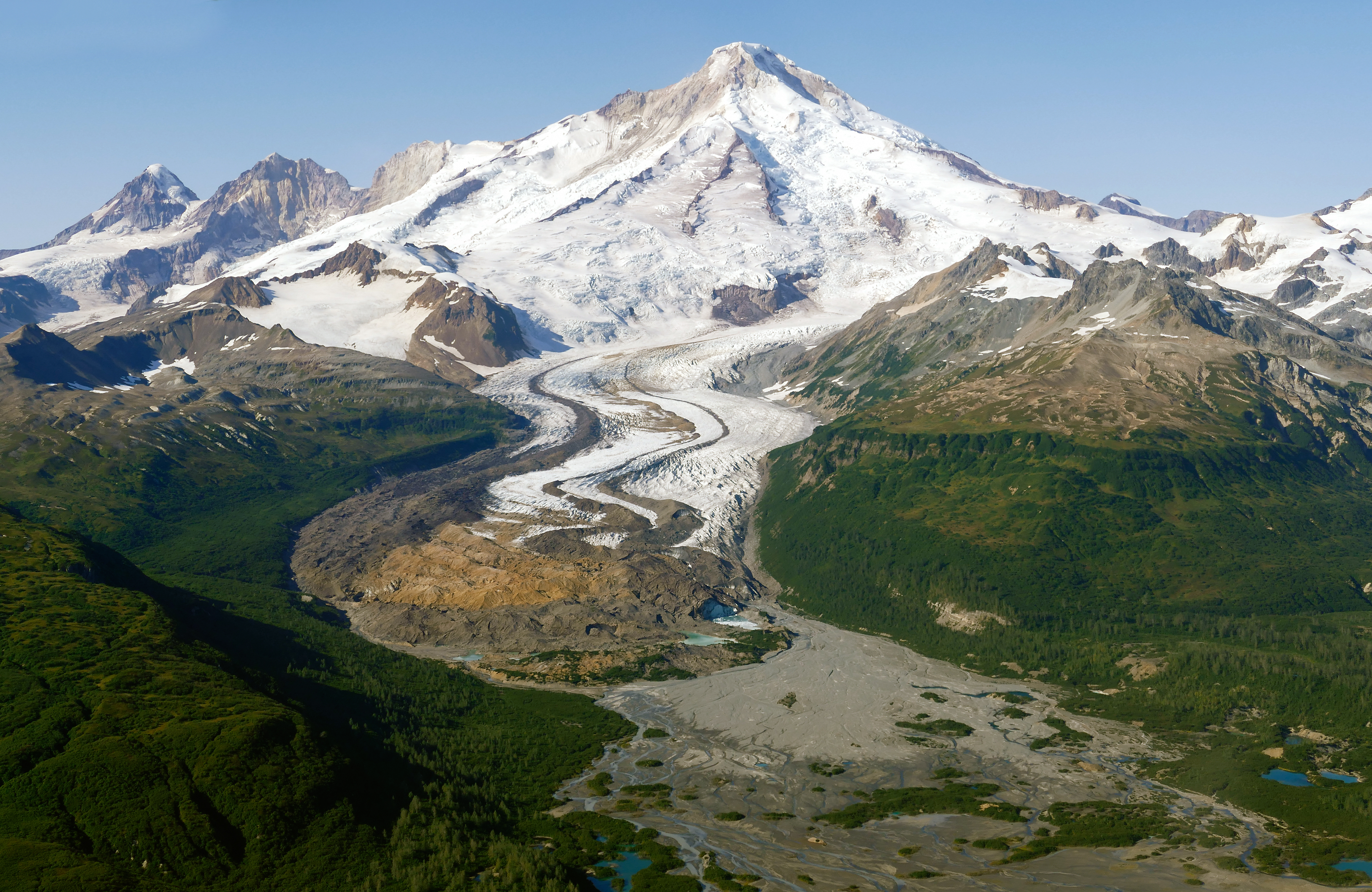
Iliamna volcano

Iliamna has not been recently active. Like Redoubt, it stands on Jurassic granite basement rock, but has been significantly altered by glacial activity that has cut away the slopes on the southern and eastern sides. The mountain has experienced seismic activity from time to time that has raised alert levels while the earthquake flurries have persisted. The peak has active fumaroles that occasionally produce visible vapor plumes.

== Climate ==
According to the Köppen climate classification system, Lake Clark National Park and Preserve has a Subarctic climate (Dfc) with cool summers and year around precipitation. Dfc climates are defined by their coldest month averaging below 0 °C (32 °F), 1–3 months averaging above 10 °C (50 °F), all months with average temperatures below 22 °C (72 °F), and no significant precipitation difference between seasons. According to the United States Department of Agriculture, the Plant Hardiness zone at Dick Proenneke's Cabin on Twin Lakes at 1,988 feet (606 m) elevation is 2b with an average annual extreme minimum temperature of −43.0 °F (−41.7 °C).

Climate data for Cannery Creek, Alaska, 1991–2020 normals, extremes 1979–present
Month	Jan	Feb	Mar	Apr	May	Jun	Jul	Aug	Sep	Oct	Nov	Dec	Year
Record high °F (°C)	46 (8)	43 (6)	52 (11)	64 (18)	71 (22)	83 (28)	83 (28)	81 (27)	69 (21)	58 (14)	48 (9)	45 (7)	83 (28)
Mean maximum °F (°C)	37.6 (3.1)	37.9 (3.3)	43.4 (6.3)	53.6 (12.0)	65.1 (18.4)	72.6 (22.6)	73.6 (23.1)	71.6 (22.0)	62.0 (16.7)	51.4 (10.8)	41.3 (5.2)	39.4 (4.1)	75.7 (24.3)
Mean daily maximum °F (°C)	28.7 (−1.8)	31.8 (−0.1)	36.3 (2.4)	44.0 (6.7)	53.0 (11.7)	60.4 (15.8)	62.2 (16.8)	61.0 (16.1)	53.6 (12.0)	43.7 (6.5)	33.7 (0.9)	30.8 (−0.7)	44.9 (7.2)
Daily mean °F (°C)	24.3 (−4.3)	26.6 (−3.0)	29.2 (−1.6)	36.5 (2.5)	44.2 (6.8)	52.2 (11.2)	55.4 (13.0)	54.2 (12.3)	47.7 (8.7)	38.9 (3.8)	29.8 (−1.2)	26.9 (−2.8)	38.8 (3.8)
Mean daily minimum °F (°C)	19.9 (−6.7)	21.4 (−5.9)	22.1 (−5.5)	29.0 (−1.7)	35.4 (1.9)	44.1 (6.7)	48.6 (9.2)	47.4 (8.6)	41.8 (5.4)	34.0 (1.1)	25.9 (−3.4)	23.0 (−5.0)	32.7 (0.4)
Mean minimum °F (°C)	3.3 (−15.9)	5.4 (−14.8)	6.4 (−14.2)	18.1 (−7.7)	28.7 (−1.8)	36.5 (2.5)	43.4 (6.3)	40.5 (4.7)	31.8 (−0.1)	23.6 (−4.7)	12.7 (−10.7)	7.0 (−13.9)	−1.1 (−18.4)
Record low °F (°C)	−18 (−28)	−11 (−24)	−4 (−20)	1 (−17)	23 (−5)	29 (−2)	35 (2)	31 (−1)	23 (−5)	10 (−12)	−8 (−22)	−12 (−24)	−18 (−28)
Average precipitation inches (mm)	10.21 (259)	9.71 (247)	6.81 (173)	6.26 (159)	7.03 (179)	5.60 (142)	7.08 (180)	13.81 (351)	17.23 (438)	14.88 (378)	11.20 (284)	12.13 (308)	121.95 (3,098)
Average snowfall inches (cm)	33.2 (84)	27.7 (70)	25.3 (64)	6.3 (16)	0.1 (0.25)	0.0 (0.0)	0.0 (0.0)	0.0 (0.0)	0.0 (0.0)	2.3 (5.8)	19.3 (49)	37.2 (94)	151.4 (383.05)
Average extreme snow depth inches (cm)	39.9 (101)	48.3 (123)	56.3 (143)	51.2 (130)	27.1 (69)	2.0 (5.1)	0.0 (0.0)	0.0 (0.0)	0.0 (0.0)	2.0 (5.1)	12.2 (31)	28.7 (73)	58.9 (150)
Average precipitation days (≥ 0.01 in)	17.8	16.3	15.6	15.6	17.1	16.1	18.6	19.2	21.6	21.3	17.3	20.0	216.5
Average snowy days (≥ 0.1 in)	11.1	10.5	9.1	2.4	0.2	0.0	0.0	0.0	0.0	1.2	7.1	12.2	53.8
Source 1: NOAA
Source 2: National Weather Service

== Activities ==
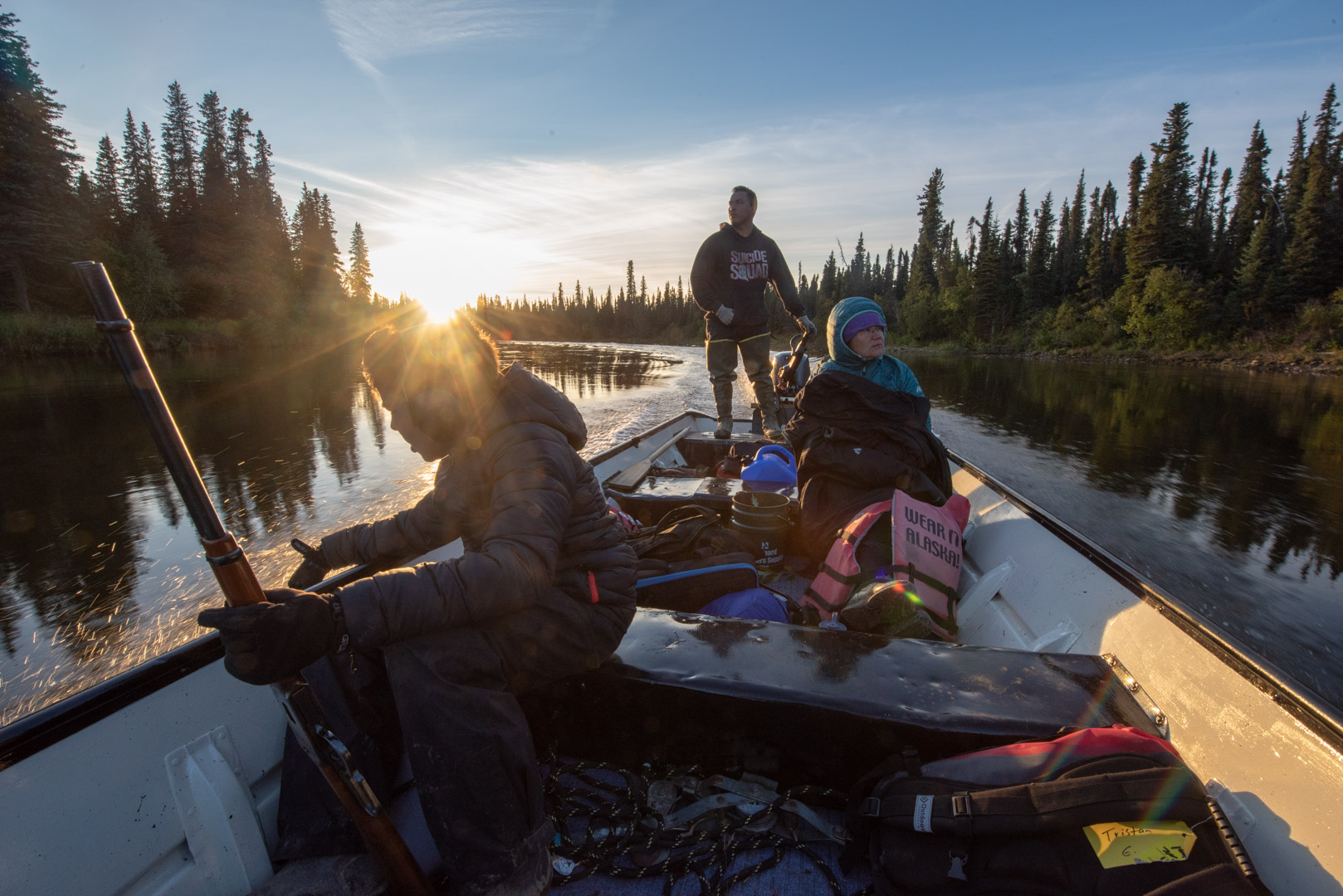
Boating in Lake Clark National Park

The park and preserve offer a variety of possible activities, including kayaking, rafting, fishing, bird-watching, hiking and camping. Most of the large Alaskan animals, and in particular brown bears, are present and viewable in the park. Fishing is allowed in both the park and preserve, while sport hunting is permitted in the preserve. Ice fishing is also available in the winter.

== Ecology ==
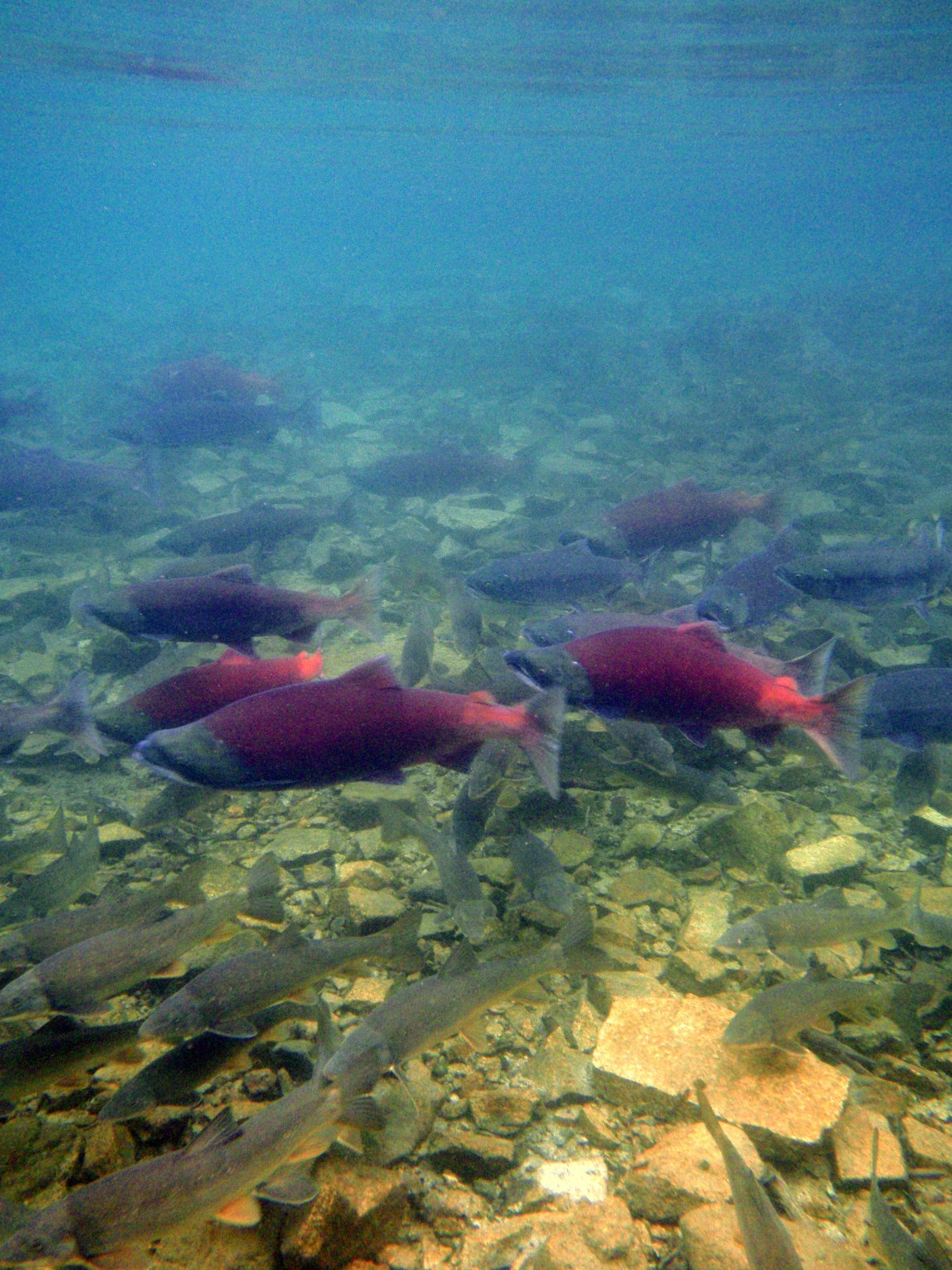
Sockeye salmon in the Kijik River

Lake Clark preserves a wide variety of Alaskan landscapes and ecosystems, corresponding to its four main physiographic areas. The coastal sections running along the Cook Inlet from Tuxedni Bay to Chinitna Bay include coastline and marine ecosystems. The mountains of the Alaska, Aleutian and Chigmit Ranges with their glaciers form a second region. On either side of the mountains the valley, lake and foothill areas present a glacially altered landscape. Boreal forest dominates the lower sections of the southwest part of the park, with white and black spruce making up most of the coniferous trees. White spruce have been affected by spruce bark beetle infestation, and spruce needle rust outbreaks have been so heavy that the surface of Lake Clark has been colored orange by spores. Farther north and west lie the tundra regions, primarily the result of elevation. The tundra supports caribou and ptarmigans.

Salt marshes along the Cook Inlet represent one of the most productive ecosystems in the park. They account for under 1% of the park's area, but provide a source of food in early summer for both brown and black bears. Lake Clark's coastal areas are rated as some of the top bear viewing destinations in the world, along with the coast of Katmai National Park. Most bears are concentrated at Chinitna Bay or Silver Salmon Creek when the fish are running. Chinitna Bay is considered by some to be one of the top bear viewing destinations in Alaska. Tuxedni Bay, north of Chinitna Bay, also provides excellent bear viewing; up to 20 brown bears have been spotted feeding on clams and sedges at a time. Fewer people visit the bay and therefore it is easier to view bears in peace. Inland areas of the park also provide bear viewing. Crescent Lake provides excellent bear viewing in June, July and August. Both grizzly and black bears are present, but grizzly bears are more common and seen more often, since black bears are shier and are easily displaced by their larger cousins. On the other side of the park, the Kvichak River is the world's most productive watershed for sockeye salmon, whose offspring account for 33% of the species' catch in the United States and 16% of world production. Salmon are so plentiful that a wolf pack at Lake Clark has been documented as the only salmon-dependent pack in the world.

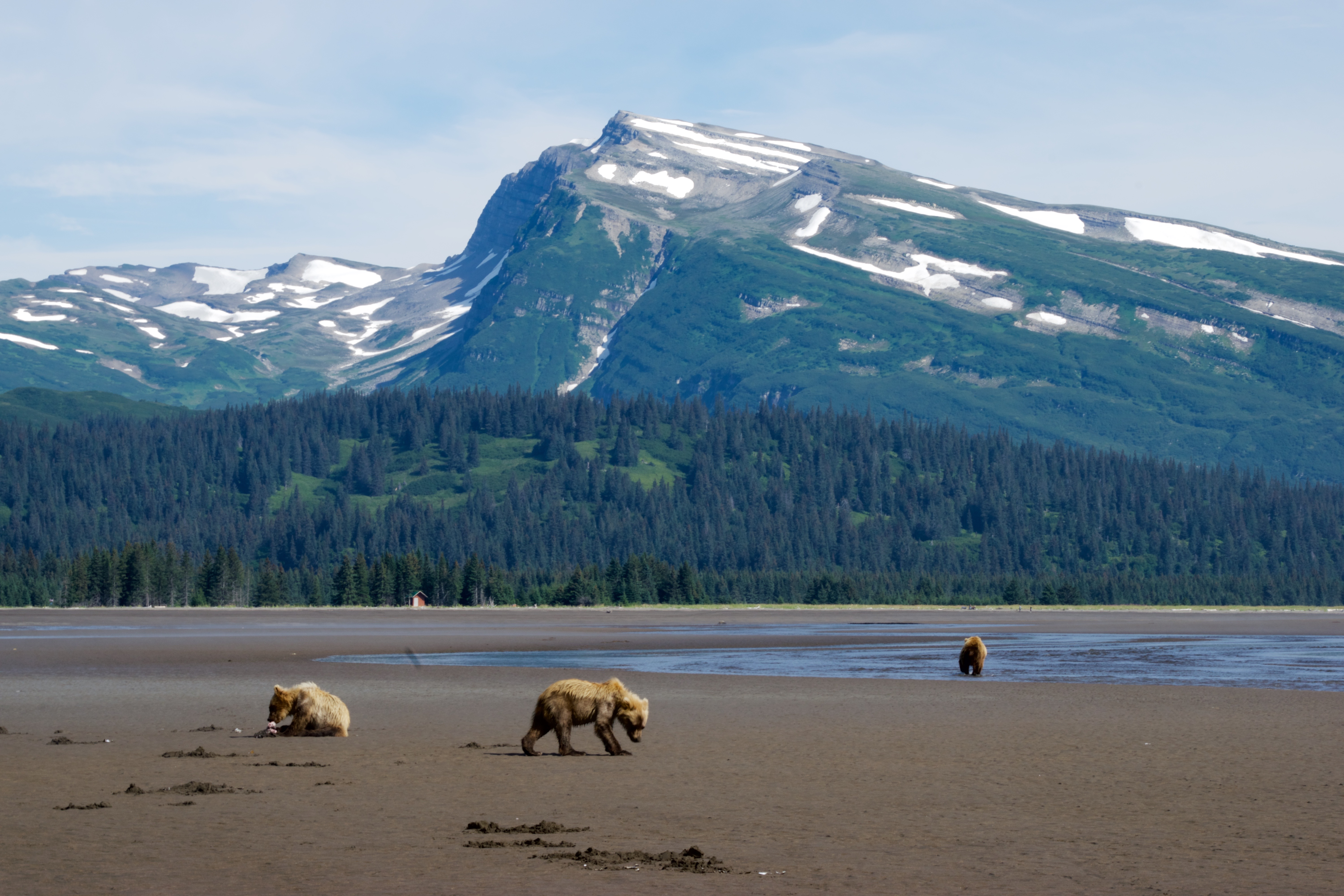
Brown bears walk along the beach at Lake Clark National Park and Preserve

Major birds of prey as well as terrestrial mammals in the park include bald eagle, golden eagle, Dall's sheep, moose, caribou, peregrine falcon, and Interior Alaskan wolf. Smaller mammals include coyotes, marten, Arctic and red foxes, wolverine, river otter, beaver and Canadian lynx. Marine mammals include sea lion, beluga whale, harbor seal, and porpoise. Both black and brown bear species are present in the park. Black bears use all areas of the park and preserve, except the higher elevations. Brown bears are most numerous along the coast. A recent survey found that about 219 bears graze in salt marshes during the summer in the coastal areas of the park. Caribou have recently declined in population size from 200,000 to 30,000 due to an unknown cause.

Weather in the park is extremely variable. Marine air from the Pacific Ocean meets drier air of the continental airmass over the park. The average summer temperature is between 50 and 65 °F (10 and 18 °C) with highs around 68 °F (20 °C) and typical winter lows of 1 °F (−17 °C). Snow can happen at any time.

== History ==
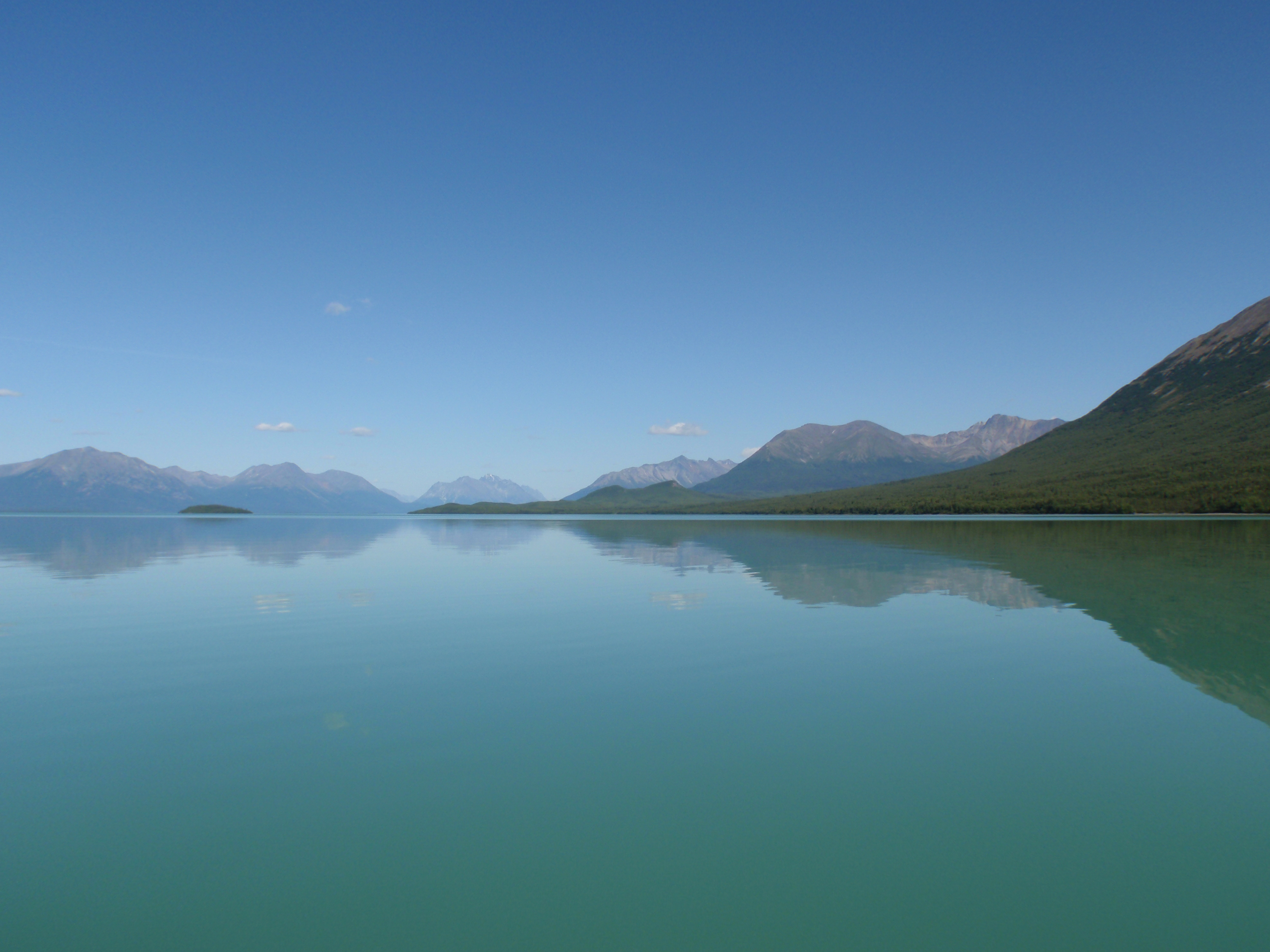
Lake Clark

The earliest human presence known in the area of Lake Clark was at Bristol Bay. People of the Paleo-Arctic tradition lived there between 10,000 years before the present and 7500 BP. These people were followed by the northern Archaic tradition between 6,000 BP and 4,000 BP. Two sites from this tradition have been documented in the park. The Arctic small tool tradition followed from about 5,000 BP to 3,000 BP. The Norton tradition came between 2,200 BP and 1,000 BP, concentrated around Bristol Bay. The Thule tradition was established around 2,000 BP and lasted until historic times. The northern Athabaskan Dena'ina presently live in the area. Kijik village is the primary archaeological site in the park, inhabited by Dena'ina until the early 20th century. Settlements have also been documented around Chinitna Bay.

The Cook Inlet was surveyed by British Captain James Cook in 1778. In succeeding decades Russian traders established themselves in the region. The major settlement during the 19th century was at Kijik, with a population in the low hundreds. By the 1890s American traders had arrived in the area, meeting a native population that had been greatly reduced by imported diseases. Kijik has been designated a National Historic Landmark district.

In 1930 the first floatplane landed on Lake Clark. In 1942 the first air taxi service was provided to Lake Clark, run by Leon "Babe" Alsworth Sr. to Port Alsworth. Apart from Port Alsworth, there are five other communities near but not within the park: Lime Village, Nondalton, Iliamna, Newhalen and Pedro Bay. Most local residents are Dena'ina.

During the 20th century the future park area was lightly populated by people with a high tolerance for solitude. One such person was Richard Proenneke, a former Iowan who came to Alaska in 1949. Proenneke lived at Twin Lakes from 1968 to 1999 in a cabin he built himself, feeding himself through subsistence hunting and by salvaging meat from animals left by sport hunters. In 1973 a friend published the book One Man's Wilderness: An Alaskan Odyssey based on his journals. Some of the movie footage shot by Proenneke of his life at the lake was compiled into the documentary, Alone in the Wilderness. Produced posthumously, it has become popular on public television in the United States. Proenneke's cabin is now owned by the park service and listed on the National Register of Historic Places.

Lake Clark was proclaimed a national monument on December 1, 1978, by President Jimmy Carter, using his authority under the Antiquities Act. In 1980, Congress passed the Alaska National Interest Lands Conservation Act (ANILCA), which established the unit as a national park and preserve.

A large open-pit mine was proposed in 2007 near the western boundary of the park. The Pebble Mine is proposed to mine molybdenum, gold and copper from an open pit about 2 miles (3.2 km) across and thousands of feet deep. Another ore body is proposed to be exploited using underground mining. Tailings from the mine are to be stored behind dams on the site, and roads and a deepwater port will be required. Concerns about the mine's relationship to the park center on dust contamination and on the mine's possible effect on the sockeye salmon population.

The 2,619,550-acre (1,060,090 ha) Jay S. Hammond Wilderness covers much of the park's area, excluding preserve lands and the Cook Inlet coast. The area includes three Wild and Scenic Rivers: the Chilikadrotna River, the Mulchatna River and the Tlikakila River. It was renamed after the former Alaska governor in 2018.

In September 2021, archaeologists announced the discovery of a 54-inch-long strip of curved hunting bow under 2 feet of water. According to radiocarbon dating analyses conducted in March, the bow was probably 460 years old, and its origin ranged from 1506 to 1660. The bow has a Yup'ik or Alutiq style features, although researchers have uncovered it in Dena'ina land.

== See also ==
- List of national parks of the United States
- National Register of Historic Places listings in Lake Clark National Park and Preserve

== Bibliography ==
- Gaul, Karen (2007) Nanutset ch'u Q'udi Gu (Before Our Time and Now) National Park Service, ISBN 978-0-9796432-3-1
