= Brooks Camp Boat House =

Historic place in Alaska, United States

- U.S. National Register of Historic Places
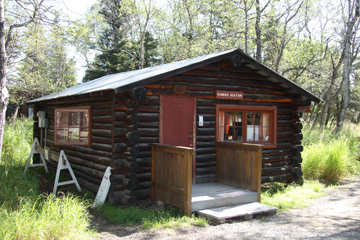

- Location within Alaska
- Location: Brooks Camp, Katmai National Park and Preserve
- Nearest city: King Salmon, Alaska
- Coordinates: 58°33′24″N 155°46′43″W
- Area: less than one acre
- Built: 1959
- Architect: National Park Service
- MPS: Tourism and Early Park Development Resources of Katmai National Park and Preserve
- NRHP reference No.: 10000071
- Added to NRHP: March 15, 2010

The Brooks Camp Boat House is a historic boathouse at Brooks Camp, a major visitor site in Katmai National Park and Preserve, located on the Alaska Peninsula of southwestern Alaska. The boat house is a simple rectangular log structure with large double-leaf door on the water side, and a door and window on the land side. It was built in 1959 by the National Park Service, and is the second building built in the park by the Park Service. It is used as a ranger station.

The building was listed on the National Register of Historic Places in 2010.

== See also ==
- National Register of Historic Places listings in Lake and Peninsula Borough, Alaska
- National Register of Historic Places listings in Katmai National Park and Preserve
