= Savonoski River Archeological District =

Archaeological site in Alaska, United States

- U.S. National Register of Historic Places
- U.S. Historic district
- Alaska Heritage Resources Survey
- Location: Address restricted, Katmai National Park and Preserve
- Nearest city: King Salmon
- Area: 79.3 acres (32.1 ha) (original); 105 acres (42 ha) (increase)
- NRHP reference No.: 78000525 (original); 03000112 (increase)
- AHRS No.: XMK-053

Significant dates
- Added to NRHP: June 23, 1978
- Boundary increase: March 23, 2003

The Savonoski River Archeological District encompasses a complex of prehistoric and historic archaeological sites on the Savonoski River near the mouth of the Grosvenor River in Katmai National Park and Preserve, located on the Alaska Peninsula of southwestern Alaska. At least two sites, designated 49-MK-3 and 49-MK-4 by state archaeologists, were identified when the site was listed in 1978. In 2003, the district was enlarge to include a third site, XMK-53. This area is believed to be the site of one of a group of Native Alaskan settlements referred to in Russian records as "Severnovsk". Excavations of a known prehistoric site in 1964 uncovered additional evidence of a post-contact settlement.

The district was listed on the National Register of Historic Places in 1978.

== See also ==
- Old Savonoski Site, a historic settlement destroyed by the 1912 eruption of Novarupta
- National Register of Historic Places listings in Lake and Peninsula Borough, Alaska
- National Register of Historic Places listings in Katmai National Park and Preserve
