= Brooks River Archeological District =

Archaeological site in Alaska, United States

- Brooks River Archaeological District
- U.S. National Register of Historic Places
- U.S. National Historic Landmark District
- Alaska Heritage Resources Survey
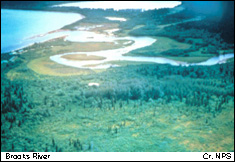
- Brooks River Archeological District

- Location within Alaska
- Location: Address restricted, along Brooks River, Katmai National Park and Preserve
- Nearest city: King Salmon
- NRHP reference No.: 78000342
- AHRS No.: XMK-051

Significant dates
- Added to NRHP: February 14, 1978
- Designated NHLD: April 19, 1993

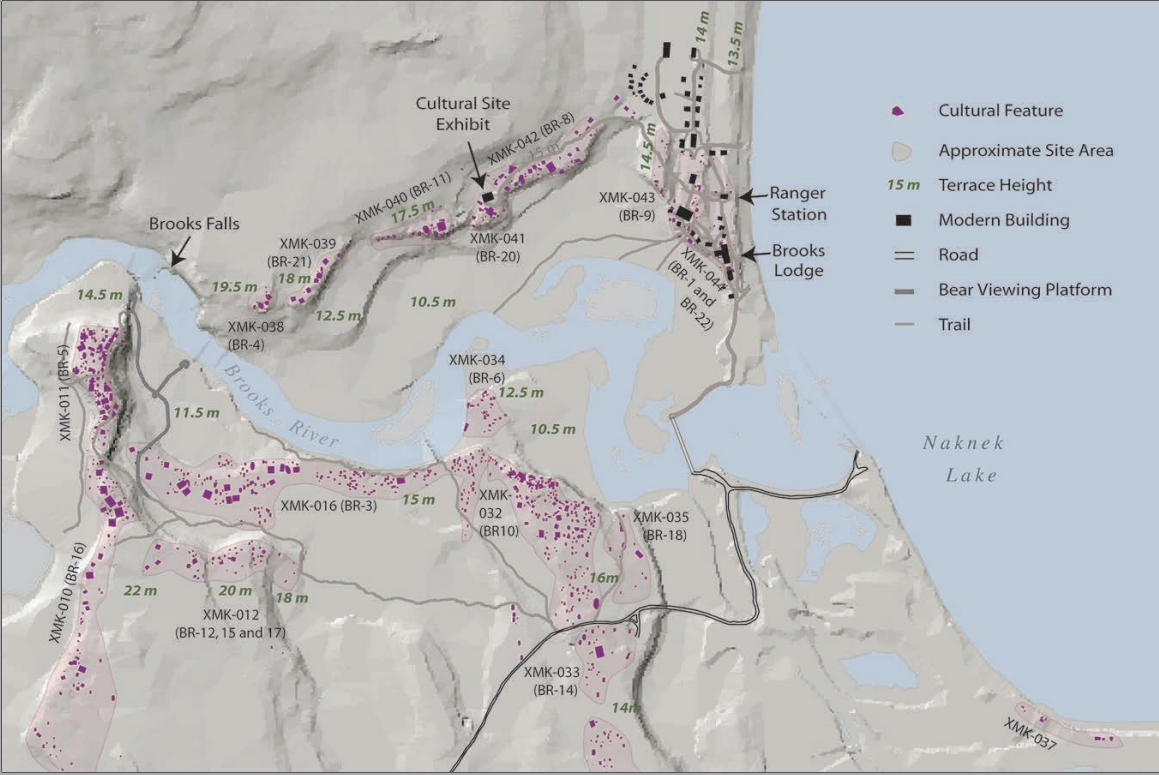
Map of the Brooks River Archaeological District

The Brooks River Archaeological District encompasses a large complex of archaeological sites along the banks of the Brooks River in Katmai National Park and Preserve in the U.S. state of Alaska. It includes at least twenty separate settlement sites with documented occupation dates from 2500 BCE to recent (post-contact) history. It was declared a National Historic Landmark in 1993. The site is partly occupied by the Brooks Camp, one of the major visitor areas of the park.

== Description ==
The Brooks River is a relatively short river which connects Brooks Lake to Naknek Lake on the upper part of the Alaska Peninsula in Katmai National Park and Preserve. The river is the site of a salmon run that attracts large numbers of bears, and has been used since the establishment of the park as a hunting, fishing, and sightseeing location. Brooks Camp is located on the north bank of the river, near Brooks Falls. Since the 1960s the area has been the subject of regular archaeological activity, often in regard to the management of the facilities at the camp. This research has regularly exposed evidence of human habitation in the area.

The geological history of the site provides remarkably well-demarcated periods of occupation, because regular volcanic activity in the region has deposited a number of (sometimes deep) ash layers in the area. The most recent of these eruptions was that of Novarupta in 1912, which was at least partly responsible for the creation of Katmai National Park. The eruption resulted in the destruction of a number of Native villages (including Savonoski), closer to the volcano, and the Brooks River area was one place they migrated to afterward.

Bedded between the deposits of at least ten separate major volcanic events dating back to 6500 BCE, are numerous occurrences of evidence of human habitation. The oldest sites found at Brooks River date to c. 3000 BCE. Finds include the remains of pit houses (similar to barabaras), stone tools, projectile points, and evidence of toolmaking (debitage). Some of the oldest discoveries were made when the National Park Service wanted to prepare the site of a house for public display: during the excavation of one of the candidate sites, rains prompted the digging of a trench to channel water away from that site, and resulted in the discovery of additional sites in the new trench.

== See also ==
- List of National Historic Landmarks in Alaska
- National Register of Historic Places listings in Lake and Peninsula Borough, Alaska
- National Register of Historic Places listings in Katmai National Park and Preserve
