= Takli Island =

Archaeological site in Alaska, United States

- Location within Alaska

Geography
- Location: Amalik Bay, Katmai National Park and Preserve
- Coordinates: 58°03′40″N 154°29′27″W

Administration
- United States
- State: Alaska
- Borough: Kodiak Island Borough
- Takli Island Archeological District
- U.S. National Register of Historic Places
- U.S. Historic district
- U.S. National Historic Landmark District – Contributing property
- Alaska Heritage Resources Survey
- Location: Address restricted
- Nearest city: Kanatak, Alaska
- Area: 2,500 acres (1,000 ha)
- Part of: Amalik Bay Archeological District (ID05000460)
- NRHP reference No.: 78000275
- AHRS No.: XMK-052

Significant dates
- Added to NRHP: May 23, 1978
- Designated NHLDCP: April 5, 2005

Takli Island (Russian: остров Такли) is an island off the southern coast of the Alaska Peninsula in the Shelikof Strait of southwestern Alaska. It is located at the mouth of Amalik Bay, off the mainland portion of Kodiak Island Borough, in Katmai National Park and Preserve. The area was first archaeologically investigated in the 1960s, when the prehistory of the area was little known, and the island's sites are type sites for a series of archaeological cultures.

The island was listed on the National Register of Historic Places in 1978. It was added as a contributing site to the Amalik Bay Archeological District, a National Historic Landmark District, in 2005.

== See also ==
- List of islands of Alaska
- National Register of Historic Places listings in Kodiak Island Borough, Alaska
- National Register of Historic Places listings in Katmai National Park and Preserve
