= Kukak =

Kukak may refer to:

- Mount Kukak
- Kahak, Iran
- Kuhak, Iran
- Kukak Bay Cannery, located on the Alaska Peninsula
- Kukak Village Site, also located on the Alaska Peninsula
