= Fure's Cabin =

Historic house in Alaska, United States

- U.S. National Register of Historic Places
- Alaska Heritage Resources Survey
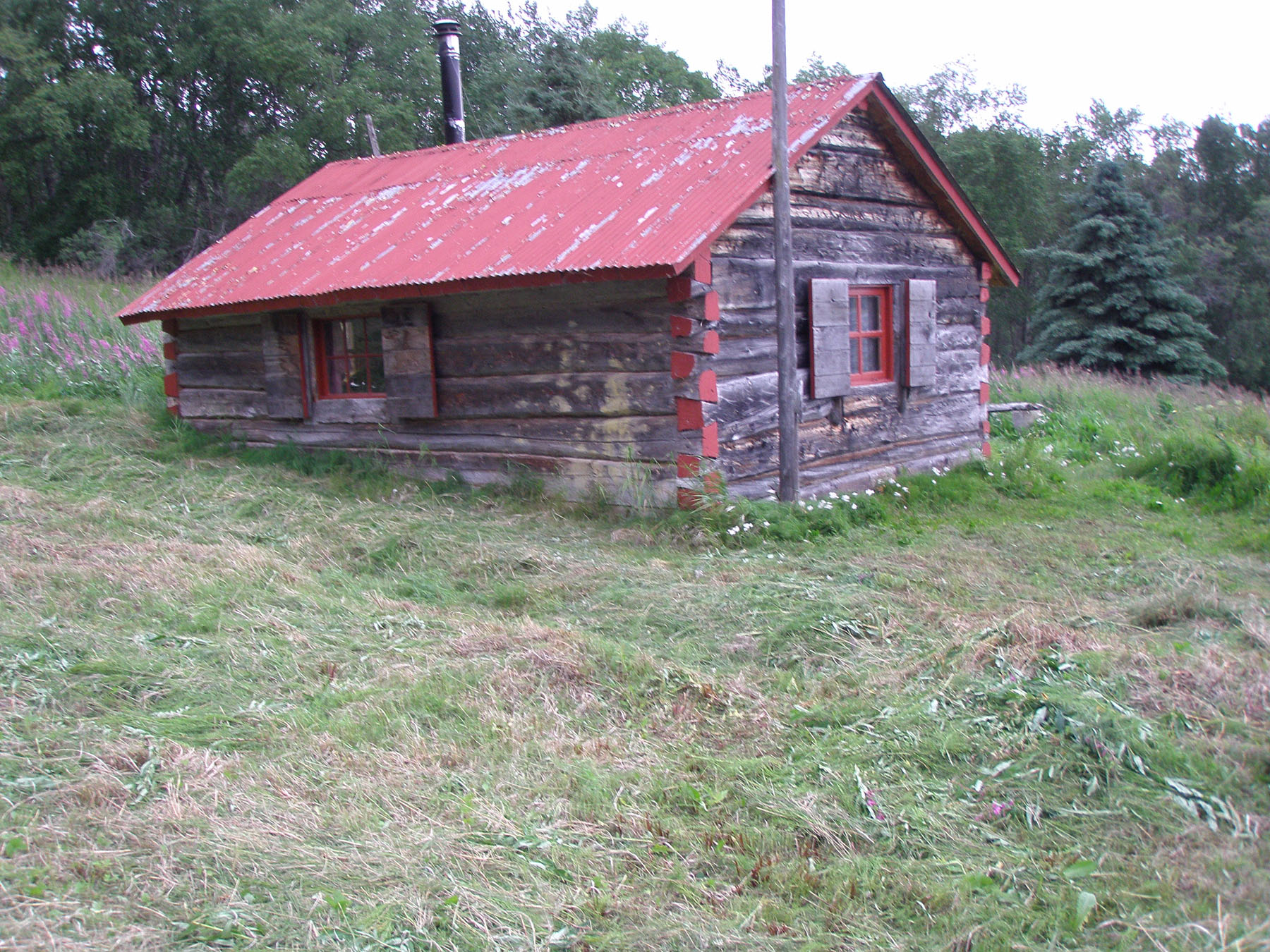

- Location within Alaska
- Location: Between Naknek Lake and Lake Grosvenor in Katmai National Park and Preserve
- Nearest city: King Salmon, Alaska
- Coordinates: 58°40′11″N 155°25′52″W
- Area: 2.4 acres (0.97 ha)
- Built: c. 1926
- Built by: Roy Fure
- Architectural style: Log cabin
- NRHP reference No.: 85000187
- AHRS No.: XMK-050
- Added to NRHP: February 7, 1985

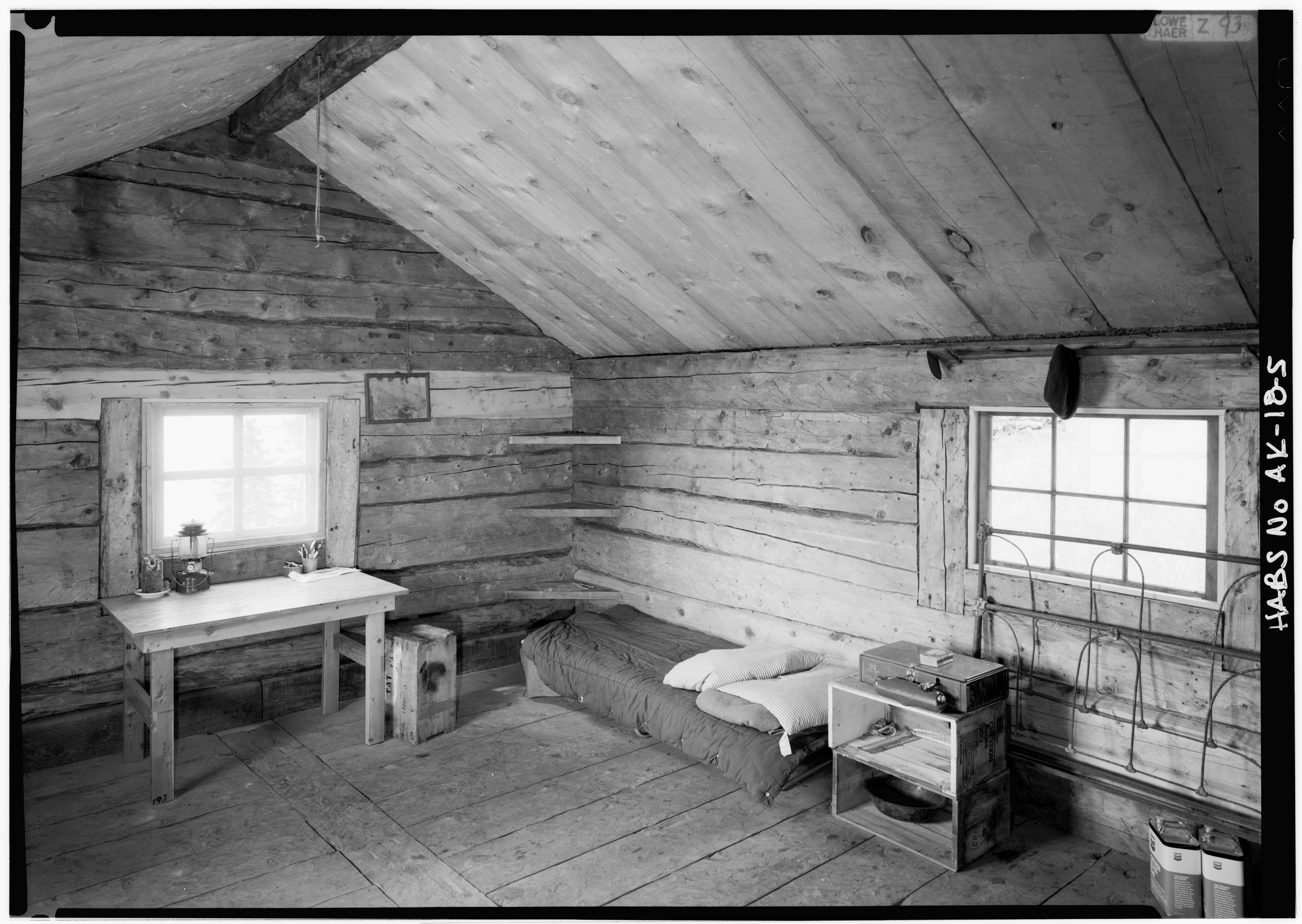
Interior view

Fure's Cabin is a historic 15-by-20-foot (4.6 m × 6.1 m) log cabin that was built in c.1926. It is located on a narrow isthmus, on the portage trail between Naknek Lake and Lake Grosvenor in Katmai National Park and Preserve on the Alaska Peninsula in the US. Also known as Roy Fure's Trapping Cabin, it was listed on the National Register of Historic Places in 1985; the listing included three contributing buildings (cabin, and a shed, and an outhouse) and one other contributing structure (a 27-foot (8.2 m) windmill tower).

== See also ==
- National Register of Historic Places listings in Lake and Peninsula Borough, Alaska
- National Register of Historic Places listings in Katmai National Park and Preserve
