= National Register of Historic Places listings in Katmai National Park and Preserve =

This is a list of the National Register of Historic Places listings in Katmai National Park and Preserve.

This is intended to be a complete list of the properties and districts on the National Register of Historic Places in Katmai National Park and Preserve, Alaska, United States. The locations of National Register properties and districts for which the latitude and longitude coordinates are included below, may be seen in a Google map.

There are 14 properties and districts listed on the National Register in the preserve, two of which are National Historic Landmarks.

This National Park Service list is complete through NPS recent listings posted June 20, 2025.

== Current listings ==
	Name on the Register	Image	Date listed	Location	City or town	Description
1	Amalik Bay Archeological District	Amalik Bay Archeological District	April 5, 2005 (#05000460)	Katmai National Park and Preserve; 58°03′41″N 154°29′40″W	King Salmon	
2	Archeological Site 49 AF 3		February 17, 1978 (#78000276)	Address restricted	Kanatak	
3	Archeological Site 49 MK 10		June 23, 1978 (#78000425)	Address restricted	Kanatak	
4	Brooks Camp Boat House	Brooks Camp Boat House	March 15, 2010 (#10000071)	Brooks Camp; 58°33′24″N 155°46′43″W	King Salmon	Originally listed as being in Dillingham Census Area.
5	Brooks River Archeological District	Brooks River Archeological District	February 14, 1978 (#78000342)	Address restricted	King Salmon	Originally listed as being in Bristol Bay Borough.
6	Brooks River Historic Ranger Station	Brooks River Historic Ranger Station	March 15, 2010 (#10000072)	Brooks Camp; 58°33′22″N 155°46′42″W	King Salmon	Originally listed as being in Dillingham Census Area.
7	DIL-161 Site	DIL-161 Site	January 22, 2007 (#06001306)	Address restricted	King Salmon	Originally listed as being in Dillingham Census Area.
8	Fure's Cabin	Fure's Cabin	February 7, 1985 (#85000187)	Between Naknek Lake and Lake Grosvenor, Katmai National Park and Preserve; 58°40′11″N 155°25′52″W	King Salmon	Originally listed as being in Bristol Bay Borough.
9	Kaguyak Village Site		June 23, 1978 (#78000274)	Address restricted	Kanatak	Originally listed as being in Dillingham Census Area.
10	Kukak Cannery Archeological Historic District	Kukak Cannery Archeological Historic District	April 7, 2003 (#03000192)	Katmai National Park and Preserve; 58°19′01″N 154°11′19″W	Kukak Bay	Originally listed as being in Lake and Peninsula Borough.
11	Kukak Village Site	Kukak Village Site	July 20, 1978 (#78000343)	Address restricted	Kanatak	Originally listed as being in the Dillingham Census Area.
12	Old Savonoski Site	Old Savonoski Site	June 23, 1978 (#78000344)	Address restricted	King Salmon	Originally listed as being in Bristol Bay Borough.
13	Savonoski River Archeological District		February 14, 1978 (#78000525)	Address restricted	King Salmon	Originally listed as being in Bristol Bay Borough.
14	Takli Island Archeological District	Takli Island Archeological District	May 23, 1978 (#78000275)	Address restricted	Kanatak	Originally listed as being in the Dillingham Census Area.

== See also ==
- National Register of Historic Places listings in Lake and Peninsula Borough, Alaska
- National Register of Historic Places listings in Dillingham Census Area, Alaska
- National Register of Historic Places listings in Bristol Bay Borough, Alaska
- List of National Historic Landmarks in Alaska
