= Brooks Camp =

Attraction and archeological site in Alaska

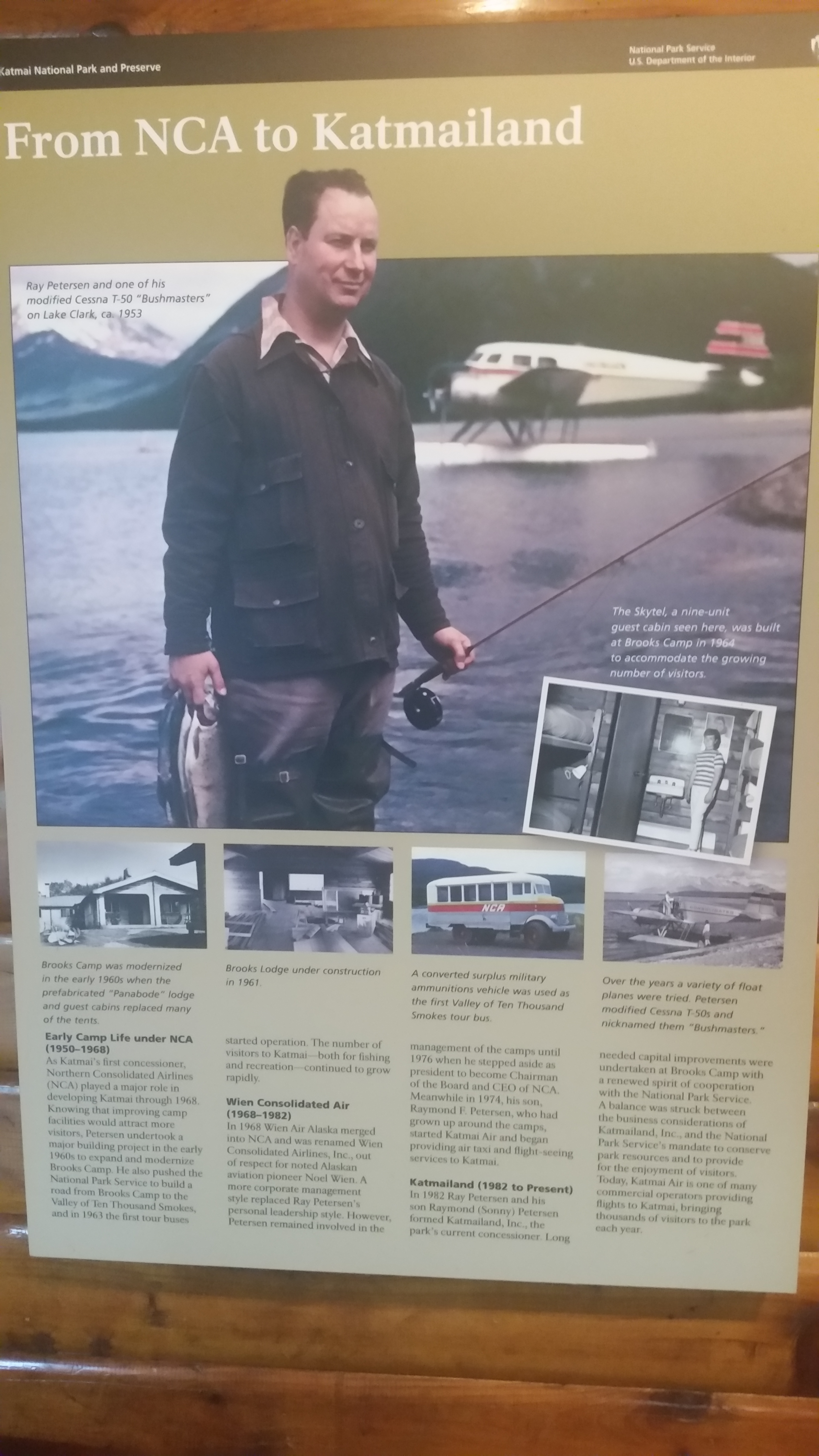
Katmai National Park marker for the history of Brooks Camp

Brooks Camp is a visitor attraction and archeological site in Katmai National Park and Preserve, noted for its opportunities for visitors to observe Alaskan brown bears catching fish in the falls of the Brooks River during salmon spawning season. It is famous for its Fat Bear Week, where hundreds of thousands observers watch the week long event online. The Brooks River connects Lake Brooks and Naknek Lake over about 2 kilometres (1.2 miles). The natural bottleneck for salmon migrations rendered it a desirable site for ancient Alaskans, who inhabited the region around 4500 BP. In the past, the Aglegmuit people inhabited the Brooks River area. The Brooks River Archeological District, which includes Brooks Camp, was designated a National Historic Landmark in 1993.

== Geology and naming ==
Five thousand years before present the level of Naknek Lake was significantly higher, and Lake Brooks was part of Naknek. As the Naknek River cut through glacial moraines, the level of Naknek Lake fell, creating Lake Brooks and the Brooks River. Permanent habitation was established along the river about 4000 years ago. The area was inhabited when the first Russian explorers reached what is now Brooks Camp in the 18th century.

The original name for the lake was Ketivik, or Qit'rwik, which means "beavers broke their houses a long time ago," or alternatively, "sheltered place behind a point." Brooks Lake and Brooks River were named in 1919 by Robert Fiske Griggs, after Alfred Hulse Brooks, the geologist in charge of exploring and mapping the Territory of Alaska.

== History ==
=== Camp development ===
The camp was developed in 1950 by Northern Consolidated Airlines, a National Park Service concessionaire who operated a chain of camps in Katmai, served by float planes. Brooks Lodge continues to operate as a concession within the park. At its inception, the camp accommodated 30 guests in 9 tent cabins, each with wooden floors, windows, doors, screen doors, cots and sleeping bags. Amenities included running water, shower facilities and a root cellar. Meals were prepared in a 32 by 16-foot kitchen. The camp welcomed 138 guests in 1950, growing to 1,082 by 1959.

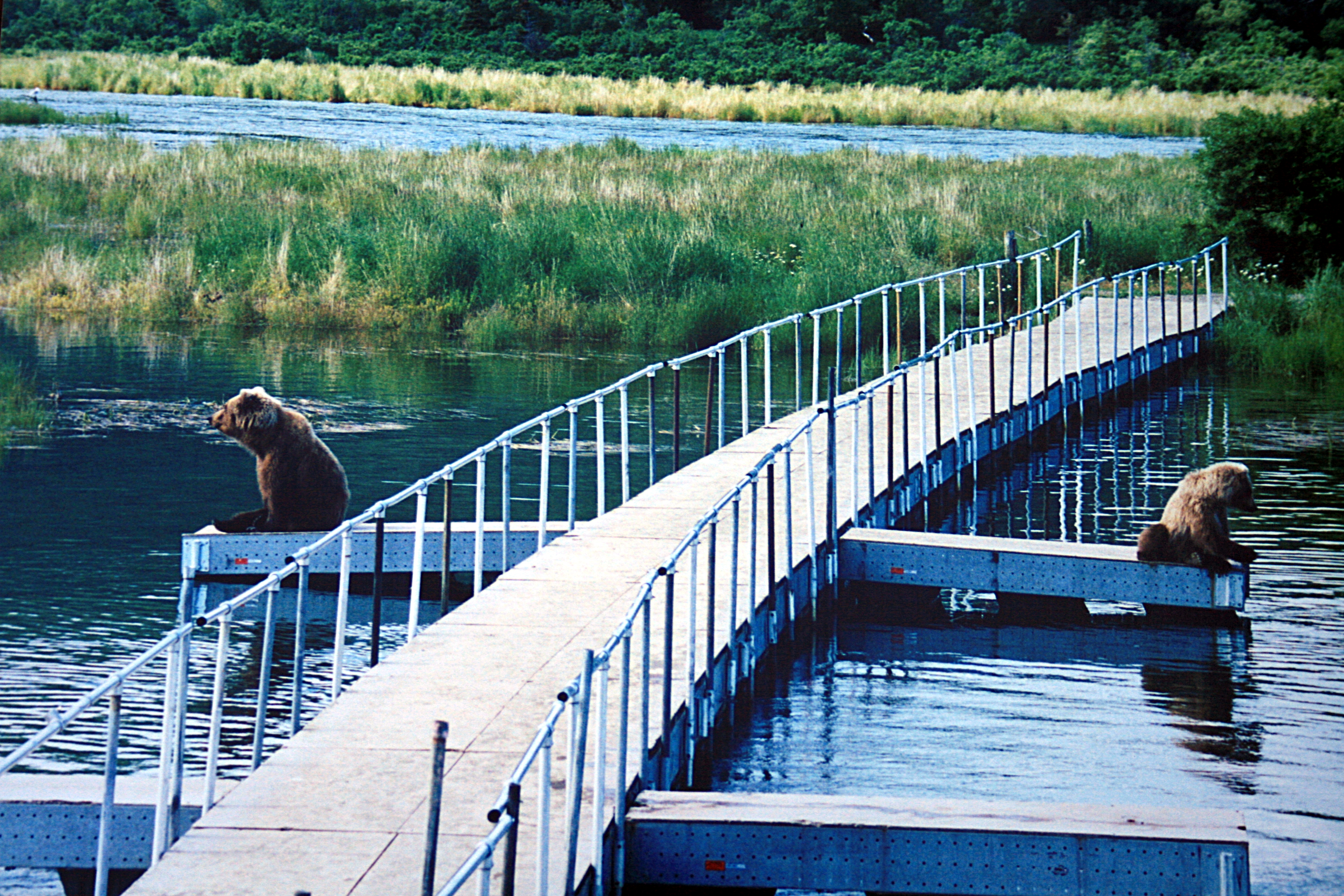
Bears on the bridge over the Brooks River

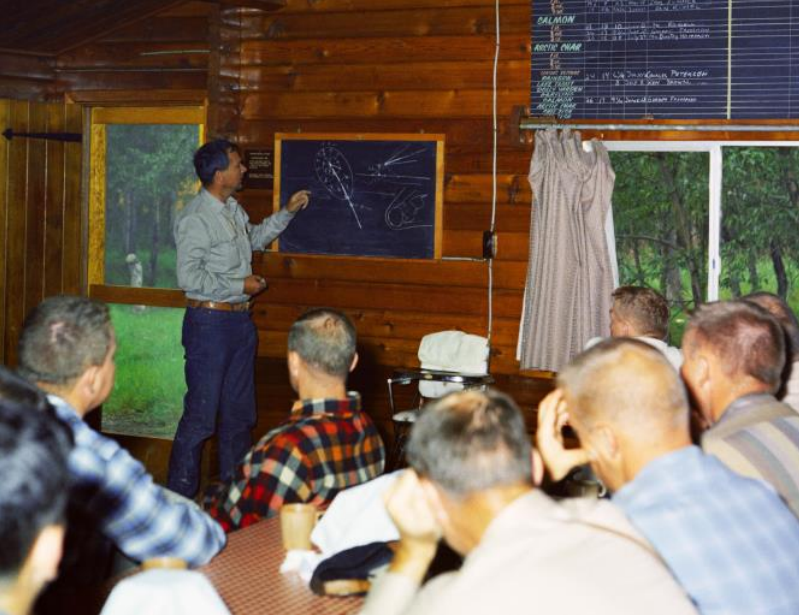
Gene Shoemaker training astronauts at Brooks Camp

With encouragement from General Twining, Ray Petersen representing NCA, approached the National Park Service and the Bureau of Land Management in Dec. 1949 to establish four fishing camps, Brooks and Grosvenor on NPS land and Kulik and Battle on BLM land. NCA would provide access to inaccessible areas of the park system, while the NPS saw a way to provide increased visitation under park protection. A five year concession permit was issued in 1950. Ray Petersen explained how he chose the location of his Angler's Paradise Lodges (Brooks, Kulik, Battle and Grosvenor), "We put the camps on the best rivers for rainbow trout. We looked for salmon spawning water that would draw the rainbows." Bo Bennett goes on to explain, "At nearly every place with two lakes and a short salmon-spawning river connecting them, Ray put in a camp." Hence, Brooks Lodge is on the Brooks River connecting Lake Brooks and Naknek Lake. Likewise, Grosvenor Lodge lies between Lake Coville and Lake Grosvenor, Kulik Lodge lies between Nonvianuk Lake and Kulik Lake, while Battle River Lodge lies between Battle Lake and Narrow Cove on Kukaklek Lake. In 1976, a policy of catch and release was implemented in all Angler's Paradise Camps.

=== Infrastructure ===
The NCA erected a red cedar Pan Adobe lodge, 7 cabins, and bath house in 1960. The first bear viewing platform at the falls and a temporary foot bridge across the mouth of Brooks River were constructed in 1981-1982. A 15 year concessionaire agreement was signed between Katmailand, Inc, and the NPS in 1981. Subsequent expansions included a larger lodge and dining room in 1984 and the removal of the last original camp tent frames in 1985 and 1986. The Falls Platform, capable of holding 40 people, was constructed in 1997 and a raised platform to the falls followed in 2000.

== Tourism ==
The National Park Service operates a seasonal visitor center at Brooks Camp, with an exhibit of a reconstructed native house built in 1967-68 in the footprint of a documented house site. Visitors arrive at the Lake Brooks Seaplane Base via floatplane. Lodge guests can take a bus tour to the Valley of Ten Thousand Smokes. A National Geographic Society-backed expedition chanced upon a valley blanketed in billowing ash, an indelible scene that extended as far as the eye could see. Although the steam has dissipated since then, tourists continue to venture into this extraordinary, moon-like terrain where astronauts once prepared for lunar missions.

A previous park ranger at Katmai observed significant online engagement with live bear webcams. Initially, the one-day event gathered only 1,700 votes in 2014. However, 2021's extended week-long competition received almost 800,000 votes. Bear viewing season peaks in July, when the salmon are migrating, and in September, when the salmon are dying after spawning and are washing downstream. Brooks Camp has achieved global recognition due to live webcams capturing activities in the park since 2012, along with Fat Bear Week. Peak visitor season is in July. The park's annual event, Fat Bear Week, is an internet-based occasion that commemorates bears as they get ready for hibernation by highlighting their increase in body weight. Because of the elevated seasonal concentrations of brown bears at Brooks Camp, adherence to specific rules and regulations is mandatory for visitors.

Video cameras for bear viewing have brought a lot of attention to Brooks Camp. A previous Katmai park ranger observed that webcams featuring bears attracted numerous online comments.

== Brooks River Historic Ranger Station ==
- Brooks River Historic Ranger Station
- U.S. National Register of Historic Places
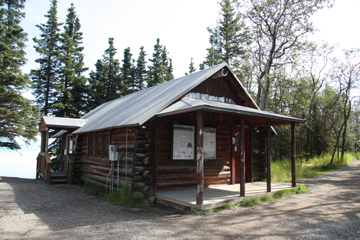
- Location: Brooks Camp, Katmai National Park and Preserve
- Nearest city: King Salmon, Alaska
- Coordinates: 58°33′24″N 155°46′43″W
- Area: less than one acre
- Built: 1955
- Architect: National Park Service
- MPS: Tourism and Early Park Development Resources of Katmai National Park and Preserve
- NRHP reference No.: 10000072
- Added to NRHP: March 15, 2010

The Brooks River Historic Ranger Station is a log structure at Brooks Camp. It is a single-story building, made out of peeled logs felled in 1954 and assembled in 1955. The building was the first structure built by the National Park Service in Katmai National Park. It was built in part to oversee the growing Brooks Camp facility, which had been built over time by tourism concessionaires.

The building was listed on the National Register of Historic Places in 2010.

== See also ==
- Brooks River Archeological District
- National Register of Historic Places listings in Lake and Peninsula Borough, Alaska
- National Register of Historic Places listings in Katmai National Park and Preserve
