= DIL-161 Site =

Archaeological site in Alaska, United States

- U.S. National Register of Historic Places
- Alaska Heritage Resources Survey
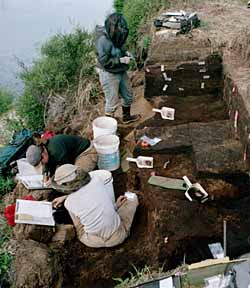
- Location: Address restricted, Katmai National Park and Preserve
- Nearest city: King Salmon, Alaska
- Area: 3.8 acres (1.5 ha)
- NRHP reference No.: 06001306
- AHRS No.: DIL-161
- Added to NRHP: January 22, 2007

The DIL-161 Site is a prehistoric archeological site in Katmai National Park and Preserve. Located on the banks of the Alagnak River, the site was first identified in 1997 by National Park Service personnel, and its extents were mapped in 2004. The site is that of a village that was occupied between about 300 BCE and 800 CE. More than 40 cabin sites, which are little more than house pits, have been identified.

The district was listed on the National Register of Historic Places in 2007.

== See also ==
- National Register of Historic Places listings in Lake and Peninsula Borough, Alaska
- National Register of Historic Places listings in Katmai National Park and Preserve
