= Kaguyak Village Site =

Archaeological site in Alaska, United States

- U.S. National Register of Historic Places
- Alaska Heritage Resources Survey
- Location: Address restricted
- Nearest city: Kanatak, Alaska
- Area: 2.2 acres (0.89 ha)
- Built: 1912
- NRHP reference No.: 78000274
- AHRS No.: AFG-043
- Added to NRHP: June 23, 1978

The Kaguyak Village Site, designated 49 Afg 4, is a historic and prehistoric archaeological site on the Pacific coast of the Alaska Peninsula in Katmai National Park and Preserve. It is the site of an Alaska Native village which was abandoned after the eruption of Novarupta in 1912. The historic elements of the site include the remains of a Russian Orthodox church and cemetery, as well as a number of frame house remnants and foundations.

The site was listed on the National Register of Historic Places in 1978.

== See also ==
- Kaguyak Village
- National Register of Historic Places listings in Kodiak Island Borough, Alaska
- National Register of Historic Places listings in Katmai National Park and Preserve
