= Kukak Bay Cannery =

- Kukak Cannery Archeological Historic District
- U.S. National Register of Historic Places
- U.S. Historic district
- Alaska Heritage Resources Survey
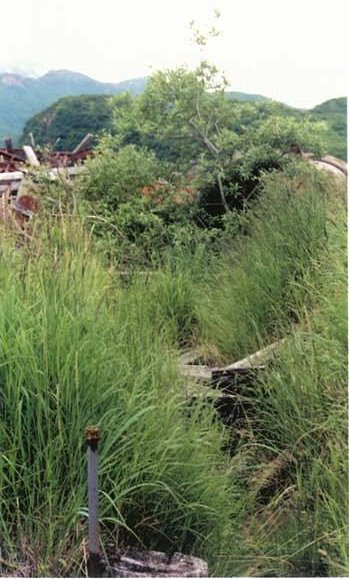
- An overgrown boardwalk at the cannery site

- Location within Alaska
- Location: Katmai National Park and Preserve
- Coordinates: 58°19′1″N 154°11′19″W
- Area: Less than one acre
- Built: 1923
- Built by: Hemrich Packing Company
- NRHP reference No.: 03000192
- AHRS No.: XMK-00060
- Added to NRHP: April 7, 2003

The Kukak Bay Cannery was a commercial razor clam canning operation on the southern coast of the Alaska Peninsula. The cannery operated intermittently from 1922 to 1951, with its most active years before 1936, when most of its complex was destroyed by fire.

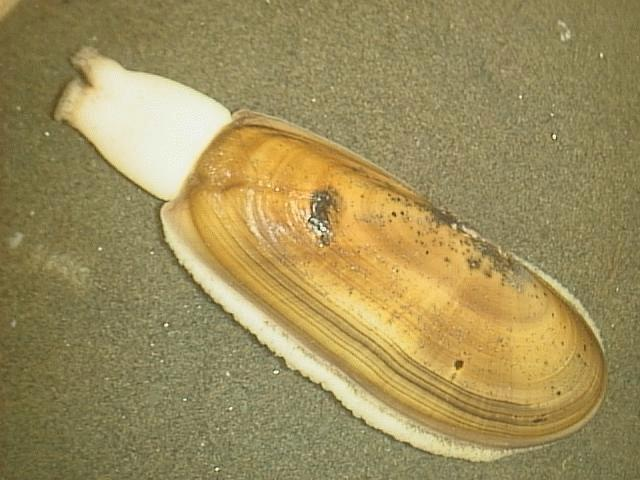
Siliqua patula, the Pacific razor clam

The remains of the cannery are located on the shores of Kukak Bay, an inlet providing some shelter from the harsh weather of the area.

The cannery property formally became part of Katmai National Park and Preserve in 1931, and was designated an archaeological historic district, comprising 18 contributing sites, on the National Register of Historic Places in 2003. It is monitored regularly by park rangers, but is deteriorating due to the weather.

== See also ==
- National Register of Historic Places listings in Kodiak Island Borough, Alaska
- National Register of Historic Places listings in Katmai National Park and Preserve
