= Kukak Village Site =

Archaeological site in Alaska, United States

- U.S. National Register of Historic Places
- Alaska Heritage Resources Survey
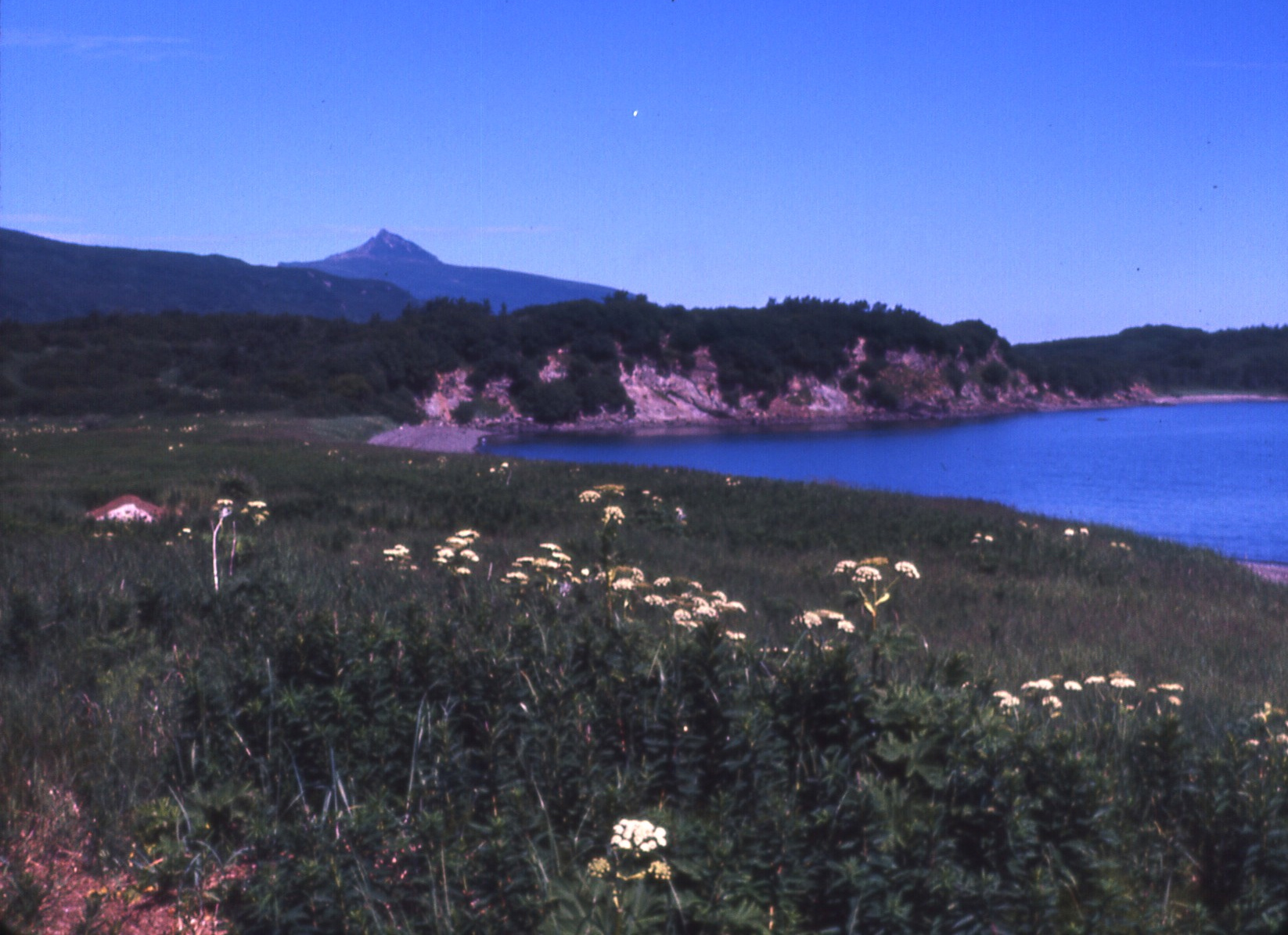
- Location: Address restricted
- Nearest city: Kanatak, Alaska
- Area: 38.9 acres (15.7 ha)
- NRHP reference No.: 78000343
- AHRS No.: XMK-006
- Added to NRHP: July 20, 1978

The Kukak Village Site is a prehistoric and historic archaeological site, located on the shore of Kukak Bay, on the south coast of the Alaska Peninsula in Katmai National Park and Preserve. The area was documented to be occupied in the early 20th century, and was abandoned after the 1912 volcanic eruption of Novarupta. The Kukak Bay area is also of prehistoric significance, with researchers identifying 89 depressions as likely sites of subterranean houses (similar to barabaras), and a refuse midden.

The site was listed on the National Register of Historic Places in 1978.

== See also ==
- National Register of Historic Places listings in Kodiak Island Borough, Alaska
- National Register of Historic Places listings in Katmai National Park and Preserve
