= Amalik Bay Archeological District =

Archaeological site in Alaska, United States

- U.S. National Register of Historic Places
- U.S. National Historic Landmark District
- Alaska Heritage Resources Survey
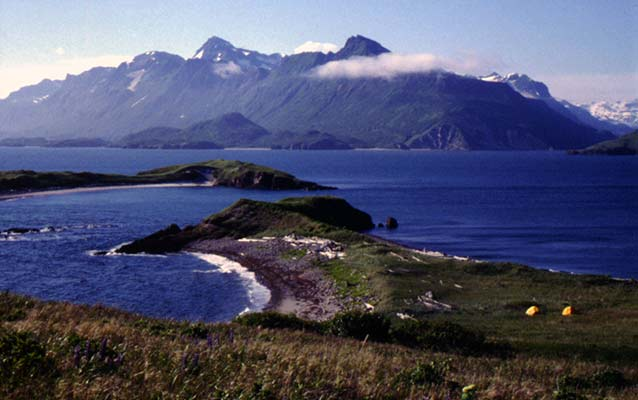
- Aerial view of Amalik Bay
- Location: Address restricted
- Nearest city: King Salmon, Alaska
- NRHP reference No.: 05000460
- AHRS No.: XMK-00165

Significant dates
- Added to NRHP: April 5, 2005
- Designated NHLD: April 5, 2005

The Amalik Bay Archeological District is a geographic area with a significant number of archaeological sites in Alaska. It is located on the Pacific coast of Katmai National Park and Preserve, in the mainland portion of Kodiak Island Borough, Alaska.

The most important site in the bay is on Mink Island, which contains evidence of human habitation from 7,300 to 500 years ago, and is one of the oldest known places of human habitation on the Alaska Peninsula. The site is located on the shore of the island and is subject to erosive tides; the National Park Service has installed a revetment to protect the site. The site has extremely well-preserved stratigraphy showing occupation sites and dietary evidence. The district was designated a National Historic Landmark and listed on the National Register of Historic Places in 2005.

== Occupation history ==
When hunter-gatherers first arrived in the area around 5500 BCE, sea levels were lower than they are today, and Takli Island, the largest island in Amalik Bay, was larger than it is now, encompassing a number of smaller nearby islands. Mink Island, whose archaeological significance was discovered in the 1960s, is one of these. The earliest inhabitants constructed a shelter of some type by excavating a pit, which would have been covered. Finds at this level include an oil lamp made out of basalt and blades made of basalt and mussel shell. Although the dating of these artifacts is uncertain, they are consistent in style with finds elsewhere dating between 8000 and 9000 BCE. This site was covered over by a major volcanic eruption c. 4600 BCE.

The site was soon reoccupied by people who hunted sea lions, which were plentiful in the area. A large house was built c. 4000 BCE, probably supported by driftwood posts, which exhibits evidence of long-term occupation. Above this structure are more than 20 layers of cultural material, indicating occupancy until c. 2100 BCE. At this time the climate became somewhat cooler, and the site was abandoned, eventually being covered by a sand dune 40 inches (100 cm) thick.

Around 0 AD Mink Island was once again occupied, with a period of nearly continuous occupation until about 1500 CE. These inhabitants were responsible for the creation of a large shell midden on the island, as well as a number of burial sites. One such burial site contained the remains of a family, including an older female, two teenagers, and two small children, buried around 1450 CE. Remains of five houses date to this time.

== Excavation history ==
Human remains were removed from the Mink Island site in the 1960s, and again in 1997, when the burial sites were threatened by erosion. The island was the subject of major archaeological activity in 2000, and the site was stabilized in 2006. It is now monitored regularly by the National Park Service.

== See also ==
- List of National Historic Landmarks in Alaska
- National Register of Historic Places listings in Kodiak Island Borough, Alaska
- National Register of Historic Places listings in Katmai National Park and Preserve
