= Kejulik Volcano =

Volcano in Alaska, United States

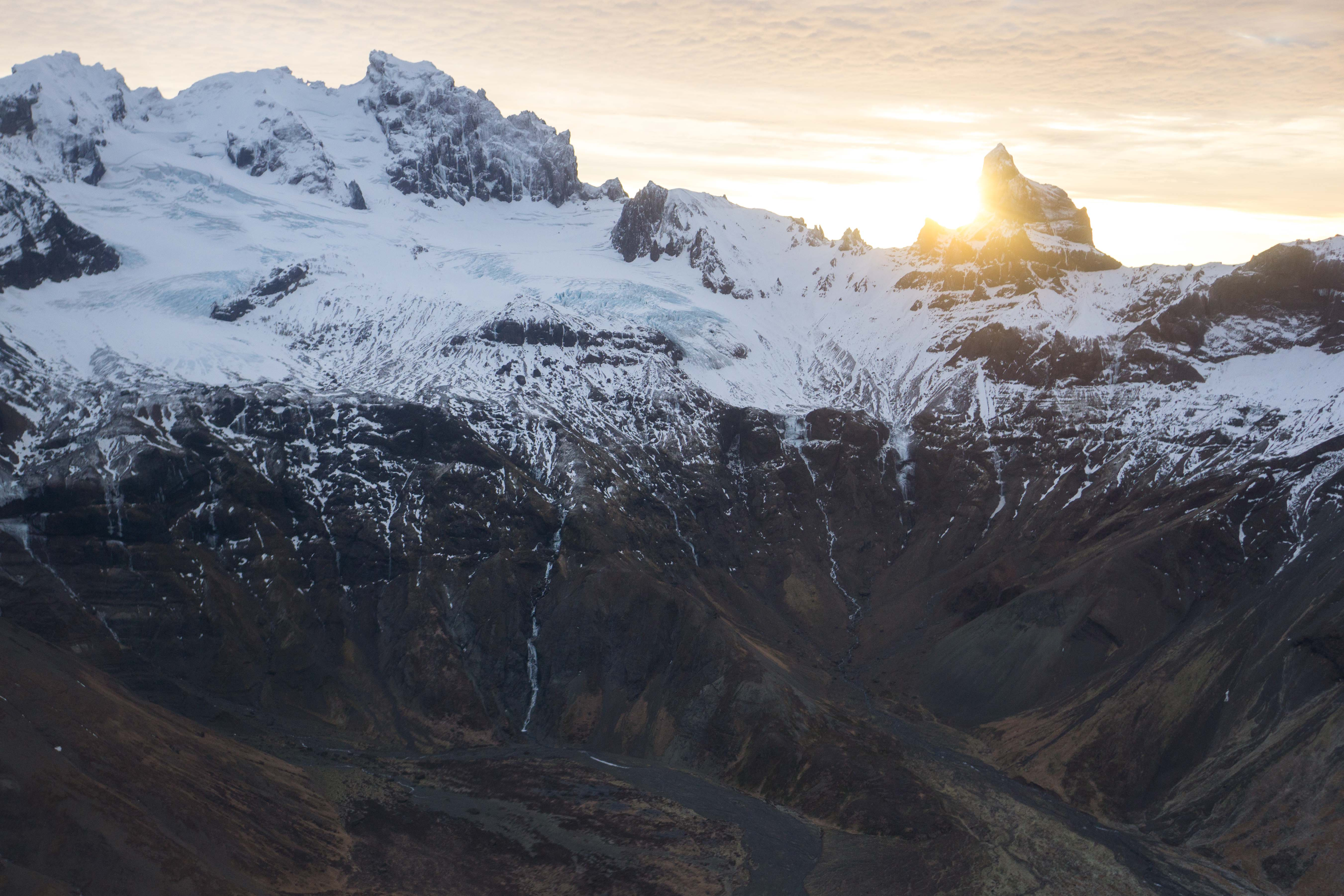
- A photo of the Kejulik Pinnacles, taken by A. Ramos of the National Park Service on November 7, 2017.

Highest point
- Elevation: 4,977 ft (1,517 m)
- Coordinates: 58°01′33″N 155°39′17″W

Geography
- Location within Alaska
- Location: Alaska Peninsula, Alaska, USA
- Parent range: Kejulik Mountains
- Topo map: USGS Mount Katmai A-6

Geology
- Rock age: Pleistocene
- Mountain type: Stratovolcano
- Volcanic arc: Aleutian Arc
- Last eruption: Unknown

Kejulik Volcano, also known as Mount Kejulik or the Kejulik Pinnacles, are highly eroded remnants of an andesitic stratovolcano located in the southwestern Kejulik Mountains within the Aleutian Range near Becharof Lake. The volcano lies on the border of Katmai National Park and Preserve and the Becharof National Wildlife Refuge, about 30 miles (48 km) southwest of Mount Katmai. Little information is available regarding Kejulik, according to the Alaska Volcano Observatory, and any possible volcanic activity is currently unknown.

== See also ==
- Becharof National Wildlife Refuge
- Becharof Wilderness
- Katmai National Park and Preserve
- List of mountains in Alaska
- List of volcanoes in the United States
