= Old Savonoski Site =

Archaeological site in Alaska, United States

- U.S. National Register of Historic Places
- Alaska Heritage Resources Survey
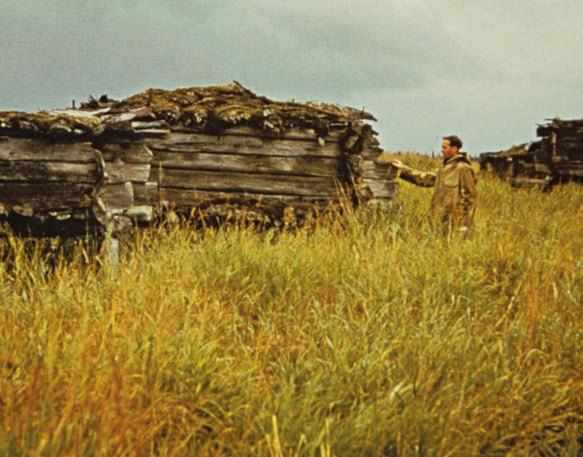
- 1940 image of food caches at site
- Location: Address restricted, Katmai National Park and Preserve
- Nearest city: King Salmon
- Area: 52 acres (21 ha)
- NRHP reference No.: 78000344
- AHRS No.: XMK-001
- Added to NRHP: June 23, 1978

The Old Savonoski Site is the former site of a native village in Lake and Peninsula Borough, Alaska, that was buried by ash in the June 1912 eruption of the Novarupta Volcano. The site is located near the confluence of the Savonoski and Ukak Rivers, and is within the bounds of the Katmai National Park and Preserve. The site was visited by archaeologists in 1953, who identified a number of surviving elements, including fifteen barabaras, or semi-subterranean dwellings.

The site was listed on the National Register of Historic Places in 1978.

== See also ==
- National Register of Historic Places listings in Katmai National Park and Preserve
- National Register of Historic Places listings in Lake and Peninsula Borough, Alaska
