= Mount Kaguyak =

Volcano in Alaska, United States

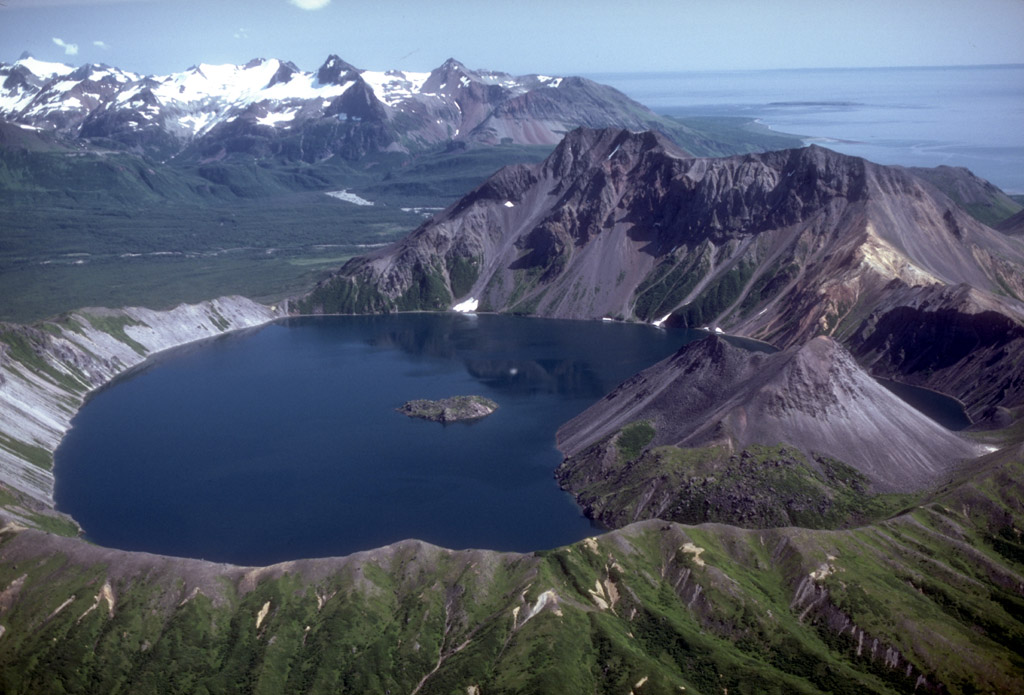
- Lake filled caldera of Kaguyak, August 1982.

Highest point
- Elevation: 2,956 ft (901 m)
- Listing: List of volcanoes in the United States
- Coordinates: 58°36′28.8″N 154°1′40.8″W

Geography
- Location within Alaska
- Location: Katmai National Park and Preserve, Alaska Peninsula, U.S.
- Parent range: Aleutian Range

Geology
- Formed by: Subduction zone volcanism
- Mountain type: Stratovolcano
- Volcanic arc: Aleutian Arc
- Last eruption: 3850 BCE

Mount Kaguyak is a stratovolcano located in the northeastern part of the Katmai National Park and Preserve in the U.S. state of Alaska. The 2.5 kilometres (1.6 mi) wide caldera is filled by a more than 180 m deep crater lake. The surface of the crater lake lies about 550 m below the rim of the caldera. Postcaldera lava domes form a prominent peninsula in the center of the lake. The volcano is 901 metres (2,956 ft) high and is topographically prominent because it rises from lowland areas near sea level in the south of the Big River.

Based on radiocarbon dating the caldera-forming eruption occurred about 5800 years before present. During this eruption at least 120 km^{2} (46 sq mi) were covered in a dacitic ignimbrite.

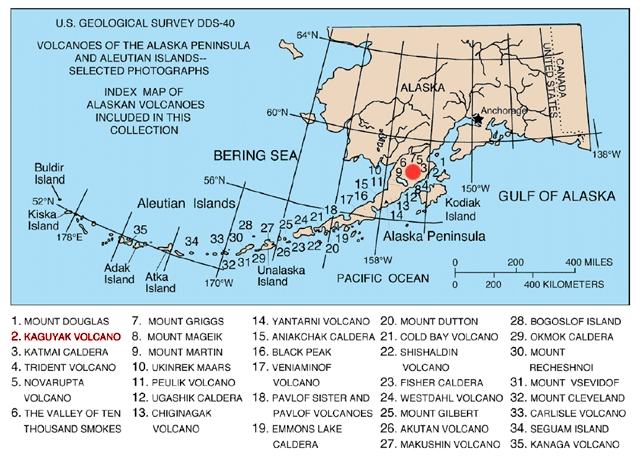
Map showing volcanoes of Alaska. The mark is set at the location of Mount Kaguyak
