= National Register of Historic Places listings in Lake and Peninsula Borough, Alaska =

Location of the Lake and Peninsula Borough in Alaska

This is a list of the National Register of Historic Places listings in Lake and Peninsula Borough, Alaska, United States.

This is intended to be a complete list of the properties and districts on the National Register of Historic Places in Lake and Peninsula Borough, Alaska, United States. The locations of National Register properties and districts for which the latitude and longitude coordinates are included below, may be seen in an online map.

There are 25 properties and districts listed on the National Register in the borough, including two National Historic Landmarks.

This National Park Service list is complete through NPS recent listings posted August 7, 2026.

== Current listings ==
	Name on the Register	Image	Date listed	Location	City or town	Description
1	Aniakchak Bay Historic Landscape District	Aniakchak Bay Historic Landscape District	February 14, 1997 (#97000016)	Surrounding the Aniakchak River from Aniakchak Crater to Aniakchak Bay; 56°45′30″N 157°31′19″W	Aniakchak National Preserve	Originally listed as being in Dillingham Census Area.
2	Dr. Elmer Bly House	Dr. Elmer Bly House	April 12, 2006 (#06000240)	Hardenburg Bay; 60°12′17″N 154°18′25″W	Port Alsworth	Now the National Park Service HQ for Lake Clark National Park and Preserve
3	Brooks Camp Boat House	Brooks Camp Boat House	March 15, 2010 (#10000071)	Brooks Camp; 58°33′24″N 155°46′43″W	Katmai National Park and Preserve	Originally listed as being in Dillingham Census Area.
4	Brooks River Archeological District	Brooks River Archeological District	February 14, 1978 (#78000342)	Along the Brooks River near Brooks Camp; 58°33′15″N 155°47′18″W	Naknek	Originally listed as being in Bristol Bay Borough.
5	Brooks River Historic Ranger Station	Brooks River Historic Ranger Station	March 15, 2010 (#10000072)	Brooks Camp; 58°33′22″N 155°46′42″W	Katmai National Park and Preserve	Now serves as visitor center for Katmai National Park. Originally listed as being in Dillingham Census Area.
6	Chilikadrotna Headwaters Archeological District		July 27, 2023 (#100009155)	Address restricted		
7	DIL-161 Site	DIL-161 Site	January 22, 2007 (#06001306)	Address restricted	Katmai National Park and Preserve	
8	Fure's Cabin	Fure's Cabin	February 7, 1985 (#85000187)	Between Naknek Lake and Lake Grosvenor; 58°40′11″N 155°25′52″W	Katmai National Park and Preserve	Originally listed as being in Bristol Bay Borough.
9	Jay and Bella Hammond Homestead		July 30, 2018 (#100002107)	N shore of Lake Clark; 60°19′26″N 154°09′29″W	Port Alsworth	A private inholding of Lake Clark National Park and Preserve, once belonging to Alaska Governor Jay Hammond.
10	Kasna Creek Mining District		February 17, 2010 (#10000017)	Address restricted	Port Alsworth	
11	Kijik Archeological District	Kijik Archeological District	October 12, 1994 (#94001644)	On the shores of Lake Clark, approximately 50 kilometres (31 mi) northeast of Nondalton; 60°17′33″N 154°15′01″W	Nondalton	Originally listed as being in Bristol Bay Borough.
12	Kijik Historic District	Kijik Historic District	January 29, 1979 (#79000410)	On the western shore of Lake Clark near the mouth of the Kijik River; 60°17′28″N 154°13′00″W	Nondalton	An Eskimo village site. Originally listed as being in Bristol Bay Borough.
13	LIBBY'S NO. 23 (Bristol Bay double ender)	LIBBY'S NO. 23 (Bristol Bay double ender)	June 14, 2013 (#13000379)	1 Park Place; 60°11′51″N 154°19′20″W	Port Alsworth	
14	Old Savonoski Site	Old Savonoski Site	June 23, 1978 (#78000344)	On the northern side of the Savonoski River, near its mouth at Naknek Lake; 58°32′00″N 155°19′00″W	Naknek	Site of native village destroyed by 1912 volcanic eruption. Originally listed as being in Bristol Bay Borough.
15	Richard Proenneke Site	Richard Proenneke Site	March 8, 2007 (#06000241)	Southeastern end of upper Twin Lakes; 60°38′42″N 153°49′15″W	Lake Clark National Park and Preserve	
16	Qinuyang		August 23, 2021 (#100006827)	Address Restricted	Igiugig vicinity	
17	St. John the Theologian Church	St. John the Theologian Church	June 6, 1980 (#80000741)	Corner of B Street and 2nd Avenue; 55°54′42″N 159°08′43″W	Perryville	Originally listed as being in Aleutian West Census Area.
18	St. Nicholas Chapel	St. Nicholas Chapel	June 6, 1980 (#80004579)	Along Main Road; 59°19′37″N 155°53′42″W	Igiugig	Originally listed as being in Dillingham Census Area.
19	St. Nicholas Chapel	St. Nicholas Chapel	June 6, 1980 (#80000751)	Along 2nd Avenue; 59°58′24″N 154°50′55″W	Nondalton	Originally listed as being in Bristol Bay Borough.
20	St. Nicholas Chapel	St. Nicholas Chapel	June 6, 1980 (#80000753)	In Pedro Bay; 59°47′07″N 154°06′10″W	Pedro Bay	Originally listed as being in Bristol Bay Borough.
21	St. Nicholas Church	St. Nicholas Church	June 6, 1980 (#80000754)	Along Church Road; 57°33′49″N 157°34′48″W	Pilot Point	Originally listed as being in Bristol Bay Borough.
22	Savonoski River Archeological District		February 14, 1978 (#78000525)	Near the mouth of the Grosvenor River; 58°34′10″N 155°01′24″W	Katmai National Park and Preserve	Originally listed as being in Bristol Bay Borough.
23	Snipe Lake Archeological District		July 27, 2023 (#100009152)	Address Restricted	Lake Clark National Park and Preserve	
24	Two Lakes Archeological District		August 12, 2019 (#100004254)	Address Restricted	Port Alsworth vicinity	
25	Wassillie Trefon Dena'ina Fish Cache	Wassillie Trefon Dena'ina Fish Cache	June 5, 2013 (#13000348)	1 Park Place; 60°11′51″N 154°19′24″W	Port Alsworth	

== See also ==
- List of National Historic Landmarks in Alaska
- National Register of Historic Places listings in Alaska
