= Kukaklek Lake =

Lake in the state of Alaska, United States

- Location within Alaska Location within North America
- Location: Lake and Peninsula Borough
- Coordinates: 59°10′12″N 155°20′28″W
- Primary outflows: Alagnak River
- Basin countries: United States
- Surface area: 46,080 acres (18,650 ha)
- Surface elevation: 247 m (810 ft)

Kukaklek is a lake in southern Alaska, near the base of the Alaska Peninsula. Located in Katmai National Park and Preserve, the lake is 46,080 acres (18,650 ha) in area and is the source for the Alagnak River, a designated Wild River. Notable for its excellent sport fishing, it is rated as one of the top wilderness destinations in Alaska. Wildlife in the area is typical of the Alaskan Peninsula, with grizzly bears, moose, gray wolf, and caribou frequently seen around the lake's shores. Grizzly bears in particular are frequently seen around the lake during the salmon run. The lake has recently been the source for a controversial grizzly bear hunt in Katmai Preserve.

Capt. Tebenkov of the Imperial Russian Navy published the native name on an 1849 map.

On September 20, 2007, just before the controversial 2007 bear hunt, an overloaded Helio Courier suffered a wing failure and crashed, killing all four men aboard. A similar incident without loss of life occurred in 2010, with a de Havilland Canada DHC-2 Beaver.
