= Barabara =

Indigenous structure

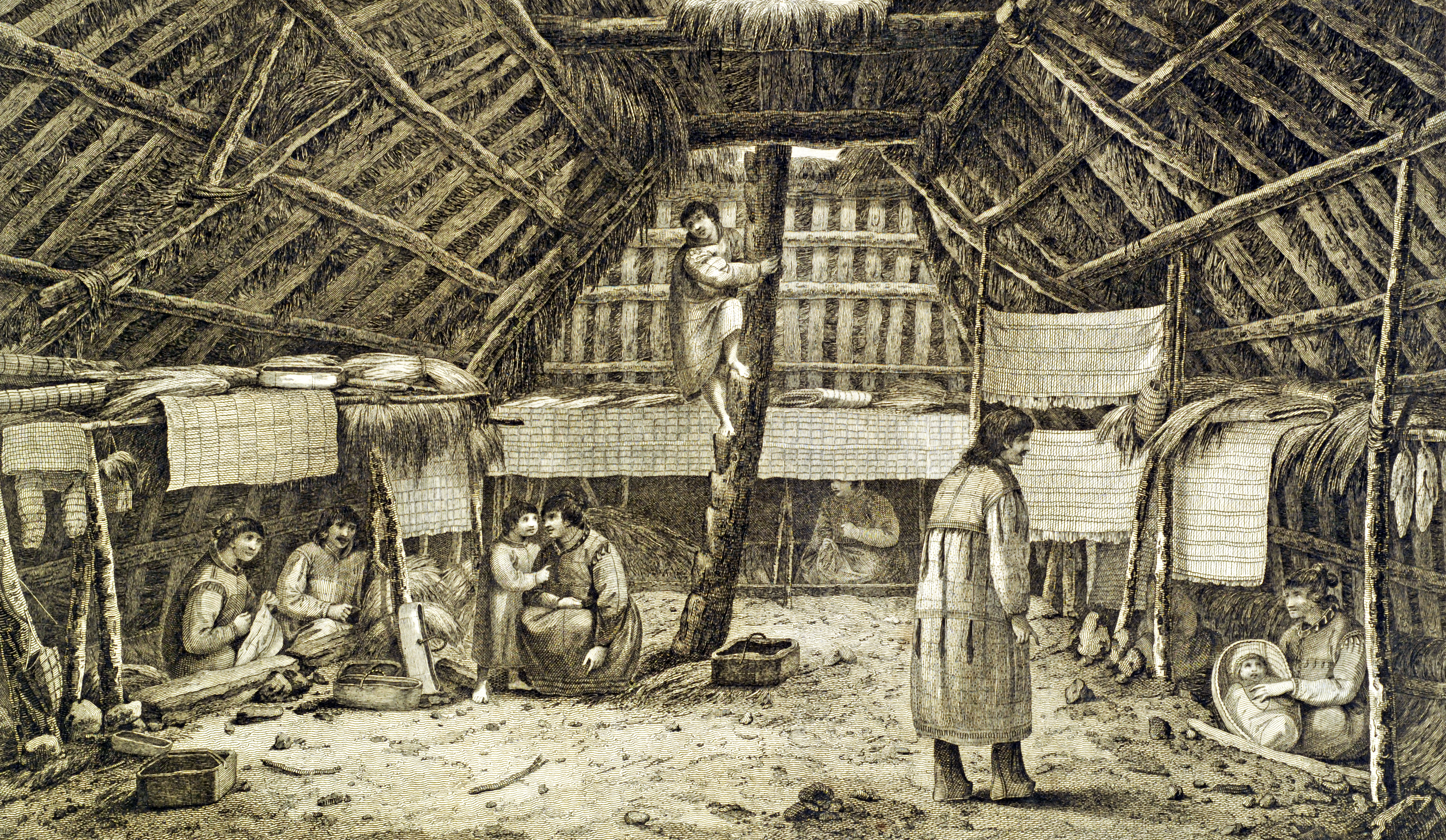
A barabara (Aleut: ulax̂), the traditional Aleut winter house

A barabara or barabora (Russian); ulax̂, ulaagamax, ulaq, or ulas (plural) (Aleut); and ciqlluaq (Alutiiq ~ Sugpiaq) were the traditional, main or communal dwellings used by the Alutiiq people and Aleuts. They lay partially underground like an earth lodge or pit-house. Most of the house was excavated, to withstand the high winds in the Aleutian islands. Barabaras are no longer used.

== Ulax̂ ==
The Unangax̂ traditional home took various forms that shared three traits. Ulax̂ were semi-subterranean; consisting of rock-framed foundation pits, built of driftwood or whalebone, with sod roofs. The homes were accessed through a hatch in the roof (Aleut: galgix̂) utilizing driftwood or whalebone ladders. These homes were often a single room with a hearth set to the side, and the entrance ladder placed in the middle of the room. Ulax̂ ranged in size depending on their location and era from an average 4 by 6 meters during the neoglacial period, to the later longhouse style homes recorded by Veniaminov; reaching between 10 and 60 meters and potentially housing over 30 families.

== Ciqlluaq ==
Traditional Alutiiq homes were created by framing a foundation pit with wooden planks and supporting the roof with a post and beam framework. This structure was insulated by layering the outside of the structure with sod and thatch. The homes were centered around a main room with a central hearth and benches providing a functional workspace. The central chamber was flanked by side chambers to provide space for sleeping, storage, and other uses. The bottom of the room had one or more holes for an "inhouse" (waste pit). The entrance typically had a small wind envelope, or "Arctic entry", to prevent cold wind, rain or snow from blowing into the main room and cooling it. A small hole in the ceiling allowed smoke to escape from the fire.

== Gallery ==
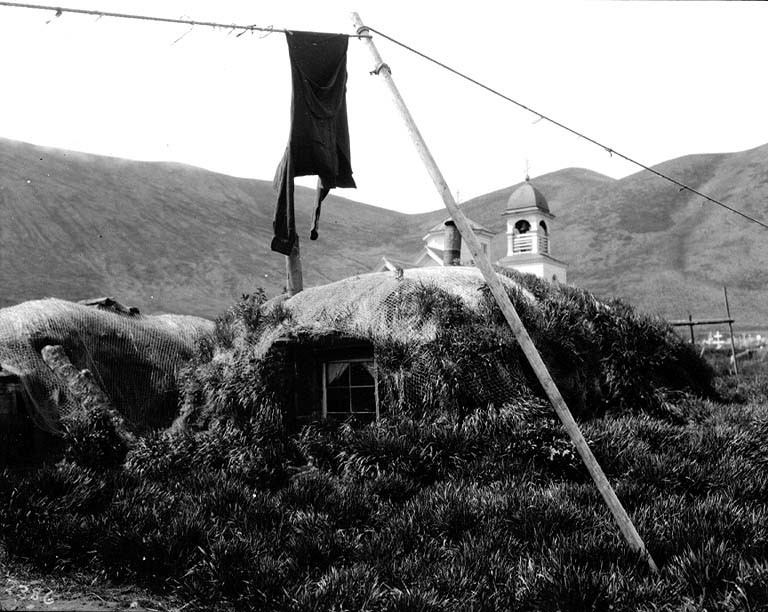
Barabaras in Karluk, Alaska with steeple in background

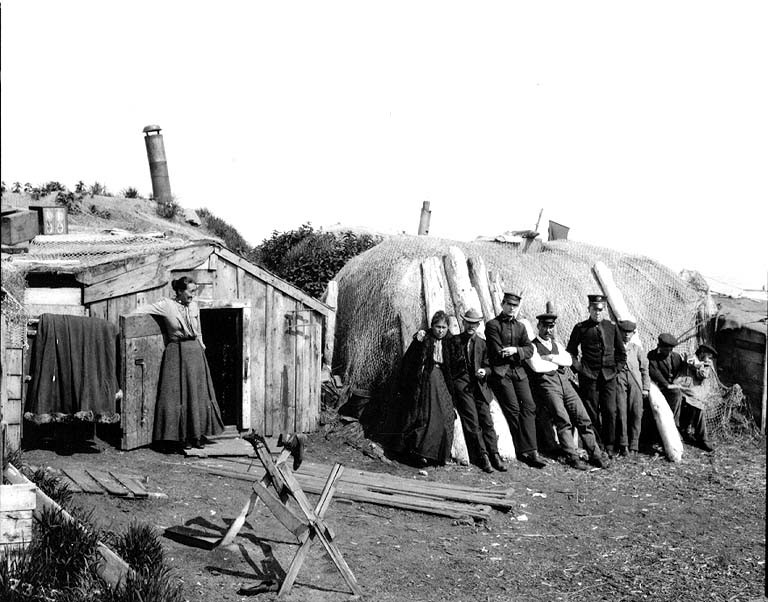
Barabaras in Karluk

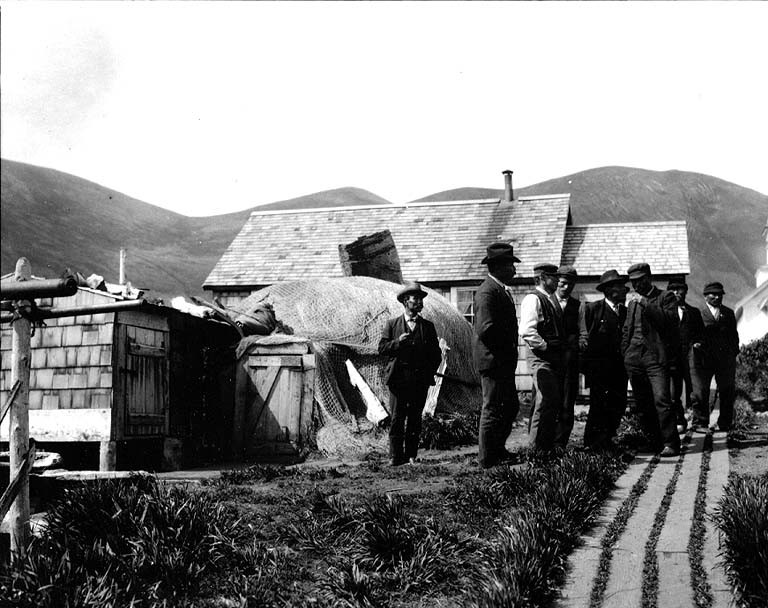
Group of men in front of structures including a barabara at center, Karluk Village, 1906

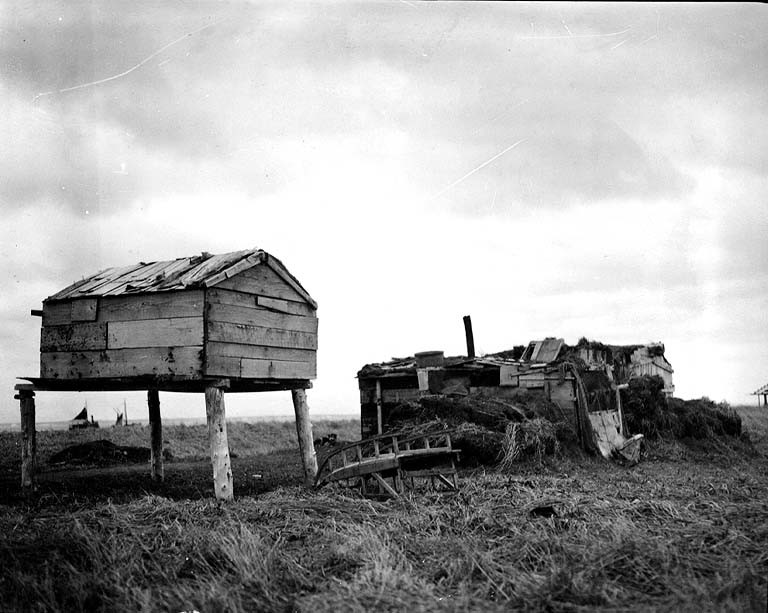
Food cache and barabara sod hut in Nushagak, 1917

== See also ==
- Qargi
- Quiggly hole
- Vernacular architecture
