= Katmai National Park and Preserve =

National park in Alaska, United States

- IUCN category II (national park)
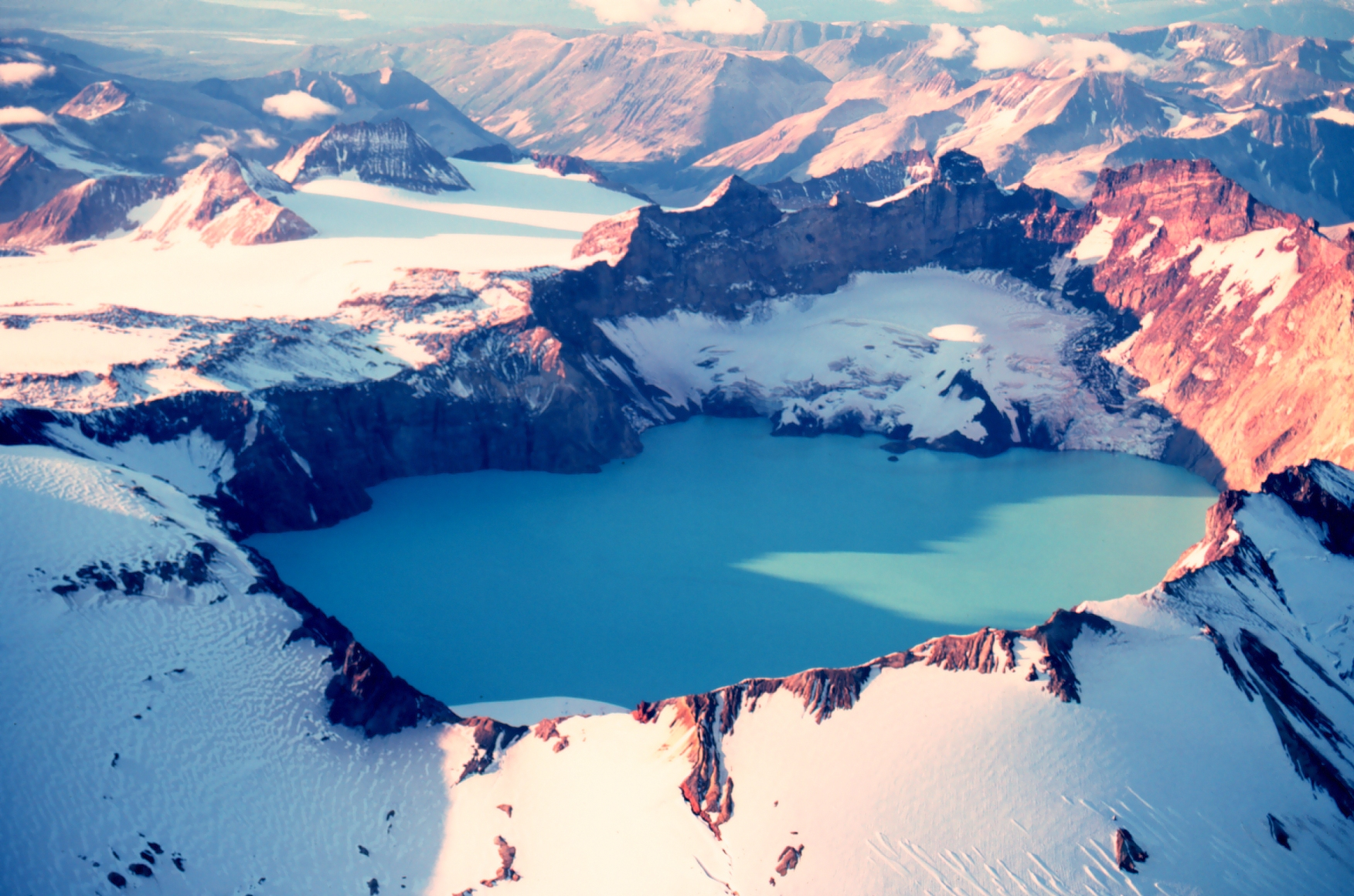
- The summit crater lake of Mount Katmai

- Location within Alaska Location within North America
- Interactive map of Katmai National Park and Preserve
- Location: Lake and Peninsula, Kodiak Island, Kenai Peninsula, and Bristol Bay boroughs, Alaska, United States
- Nearest city: King Salmon
- Coordinates: 58.5°N 155.0°W
- Area: 4,093,077 acres (16,564.09 km^{2})
- Established: December 2, 1980
- Visitors: 34,479 (in 2025)
- Governing body: National Park Service
- Website: nps.gov/katm

Katmai National Park and Preserve is a United States national park and preserve in southwest Alaska, notable for the Valley of Ten Thousand Smokes and for its brown bears. The park and preserve encompass 4,093,077 acres (6,395.43 sq mi; 16,564.09 km^{2}), which is between the land areas of Connecticut and New Jersey. Most of the national park is a designated wilderness area. The park is named after Mount Katmai, its centerpiece stratovolcano. The park is located on the Alaska Peninsula, across from Kodiak Island, with headquarters in nearby King Salmon, about 290 miles (470 km) southwest of Anchorage. The area was first designated a national monument in 1918 to protect the area around the major 1912 volcanic eruption of Novarupta, which formed the Valley of Ten Thousand Smokes, a 40-square-mile (100 km^{2}), 100-to-700-foot-deep (30 to 213 m) pyroclastic flow. The park includes as many as 18 individual volcanoes, seven of which have been active since 1900.

Initially designated because of its volcanic history, the monument was left undeveloped and largely unvisited until the 1950s. The monument and surrounding lands became appreciated for their wide variety of wildlife, including an abundance of sockeye salmon and the brown bears that feed upon them. After a series of boundary expansions, the present national park and preserve were established in 1980 under the Alaska National Interest Lands Conservation Act.

== Geography ==
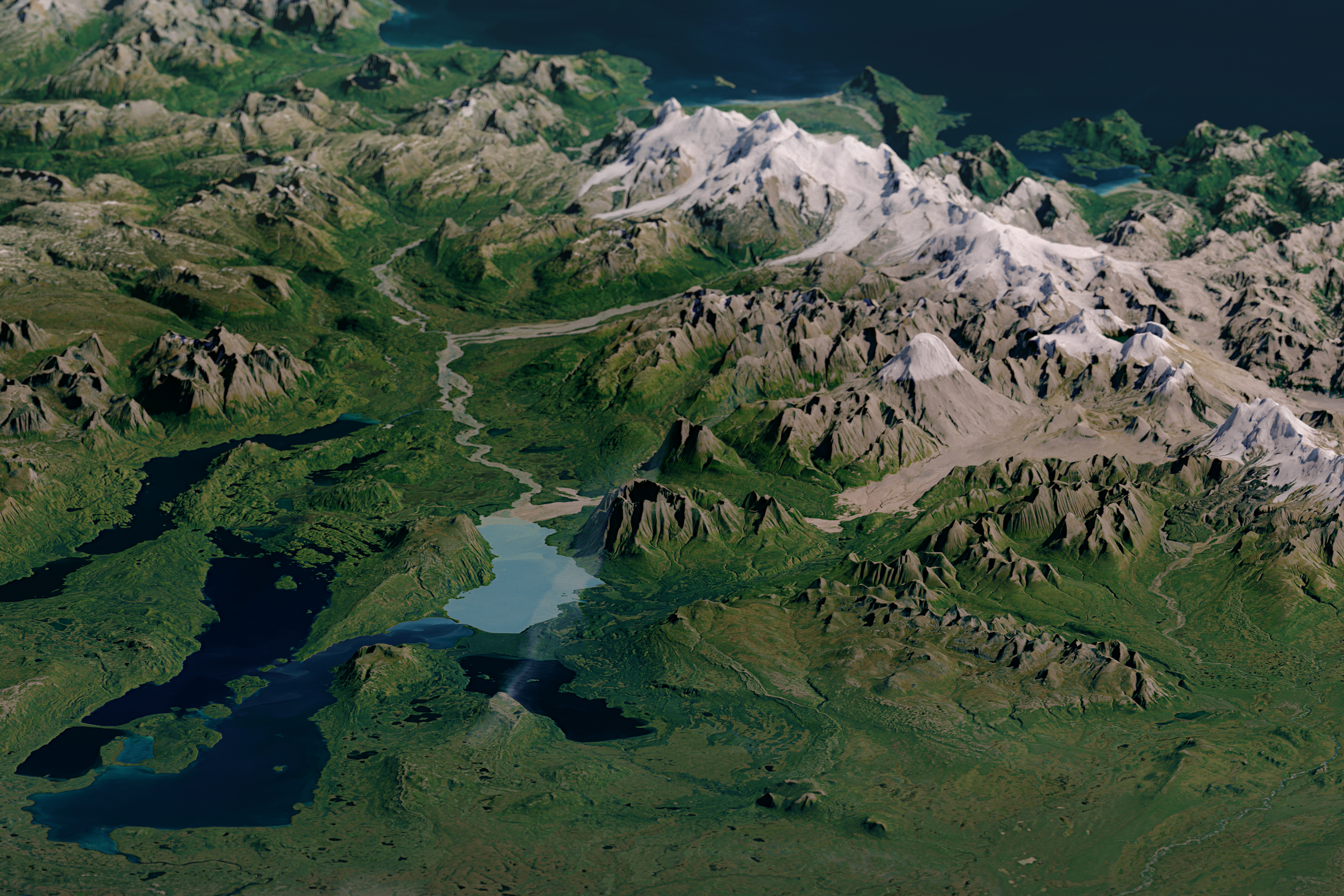
3D image of the park created via Landsat data overlaid on a digital elevation model

Katmai occupies the Pacific Ocean side of the Alaska Peninsula, opposite Kodiak Island on the Shelikof Strait. The park's chief features are its coast, the Aleutian Range with a chain of fifteen volcanic mountains across the coastal southeastern part of the park, and a series of large lakes in the flatter western part of the park. The closest significant town to the park is King Salmon, where the park's headquarters is located, about 5 miles (8.0 km) down the Naknek River from the park entrance. The Alaska Peninsula Highway connects Naknek Lake near the entrance to King Salmon, continuing to the mouth of the river at Naknek. The road is not connected to the Alaska road system. Access to the park's interior is by boat on Naknek Lake. Another road runs from Brooks Camp to Three Forks, which overlooks the Valley of Ten Thousand Smokes. The 497-mile (800 km) long coastline (however, see coastline paradox) is deeply indented, running from the entrance to the Cook Inlet at Kamishak Bay south to Cape Kubugakli. The mountains run from southwest to northeast, about 15 miles (24 km) inland.

The park abuts McNeil River State Game Sanctuary and Refuge on Kamishak Bay. The Alagnak River, designated a wild river, originates within the preserve at Kukaklek Lake. The Naknek River, which empties into Bristol Bay, originates within the park. The park adjoins Becharof National Wildlife Refuge to the south. Of the park and preserve's acres, 3,922,529 acres (1,587,391 ha) are in the national park where all sport and subsistence hunting is prohibited. 418,548 acres (169,380 ha) are preserve lands, where both sport and subsistence hunting are permitted. The most commonly hunted species in the preserve includes the brown bear, which has led to some problems about bear hunting due to small preserve population sizes and stalking bears to close limits.

The foundation rocks on the Alaska Peninsula are divided by the Bruin Bay Fault into fossiliferous sedimentary rocks of Jurassic and Cretaceous age to the east and metamorphic and igneous rocks to the west. The granite Aleutian Range batholith has intruded through these rocks. The majority of the higher mountains in the park are of volcanic origin. The park has been extensively altered by glaciation, both in the high lands where the mountains have been sculpted by glaciers, and in the lowlands where lakes have been excavated. Outwash plains and terminal moraines are also featured in the park. Soil types vary from rock or volcanic ash of varying depth to deep, wet soils overlain with peat. Although permafrost exists at higher elevations, it is not present in the lowlands.

Two physiographic provinces cover the park. The Aleutian Range province is composed of the Shelikof Strait coastline, about 10 miles (16 km) deep along the coast, the Aleutian Mountain zone, and the lake, or Hudsonian zone. Farther west the Nushagak-Bristol Bay Lowlands province is separated from the Aleutian zone by the Bruin Bay Fault, occupying a small corner of the park.

=== Volcanoes ===
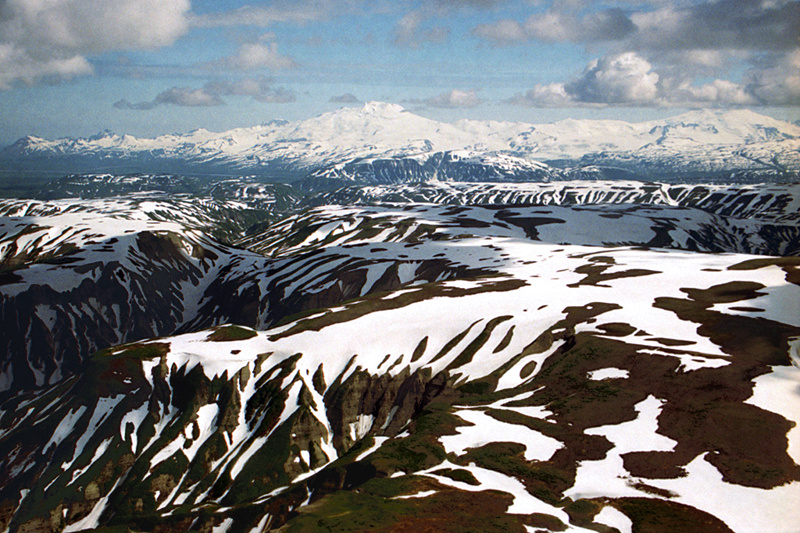
Fourpeaked Mountain and Mount Douglas

The active volcanoes in the park are Mount Katmai, Novarupta, Trident Volcano, Mount Mageik, Mount Martin and Fourpeaked Mountain. Other volcanoes that have erupted in recent times in geological terms, but not in historical times, are Mount Douglas, Mount Griggs, Snowy Mountain, Mount Denison, Mount Kukak, Devils Desk, Mount Kaguyak, Mount Cerberus, Falling Mountain and Kejulik Volcano. Martin and Mageik produce steam that can be seen from King Salmon, while Trident was active in 1957–1965 and 1968.

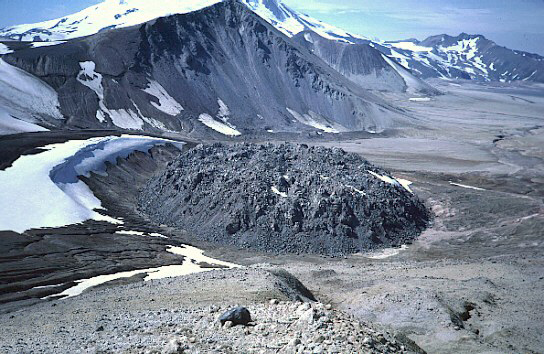
Novarupta lava dome

The most significant volcanic event in historical times was the simultaneous eruption of Mount Katmai and Novarupta in June 1912. Novarupta's eruption produced a pyroclastic flow that covered a nearby valley with ash as much as 300 feet (91 m) thick. At the same time, the summit of Katmai collapsed into a caldera. As the valley deposits cooled, they emitted steam from fissures and fumaroles, earning the name "Valley of Ten Thousand Smokes". As heat has dissipated from the deposits the steam vents have subsided and the valley has been eroded. Streams have cut canyons as much as 100 feet (30 m) deep, but only 5 to 10 feet (1.5 to 3.0 m) wide. Katmai is a stratovolcano, 6,716 feet (2,047 m) in height, with a large summit caldera. Several glaciers originate from the mountain, and one in the caldera is one of the few to have formed in historical times. The caldera floor is about 250 metres (820 ft) below the rim. The mountain stands on Jurassic sedimentary rocks, and its volcanic components are less than 1,500 feet (460 m) thick. Apart from the 1912 eruption, no significant activity has occurred in historical times. Novarupta is described as a Plinian pyroclastic vent with a plug dome, a 2,000-metre (6,600 ft) diameter crater with a 65-metre (213 ft), 400-metre (1,300 ft) diameter dome in the middle. Its only historical activity was the 1912 eruption.

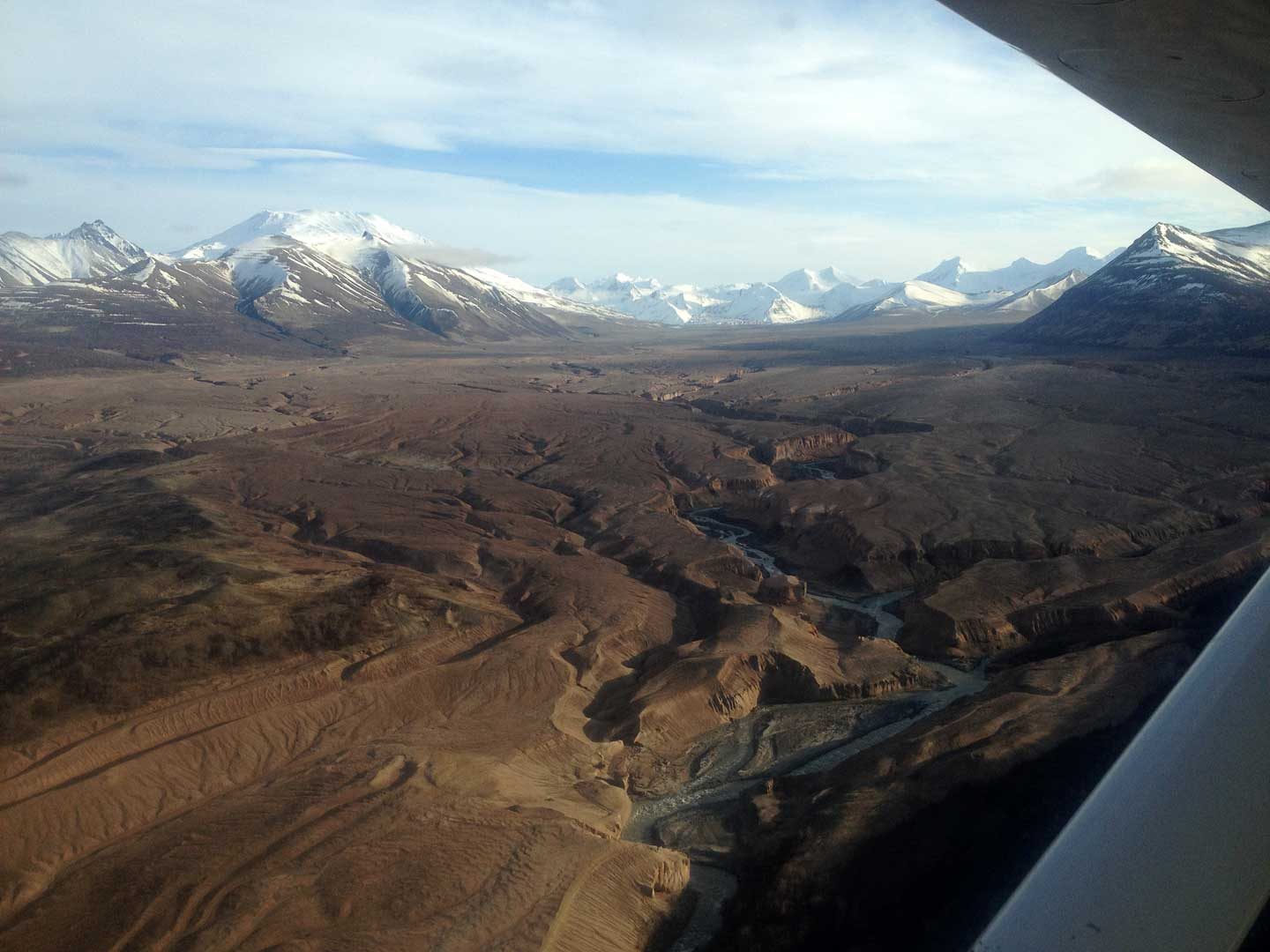
Valley of Ten Thousand Smokes

Trident is a complex of three stratovolcanoes, the highest of which is 3,599 feet (1,097 m) tall, standing up to 1,894 feet (577 m) above their base. Trident has been intermittently active in historical times, primarily between 1953 and 1974. During that time about 0.7 cubic kilometers of material was erupted to form a new peak called Southwest Trident from the former site of a large fumarolic pit. Mount Martin is 6,102 feet (1,860 m) high, standing on a 1,400-metre (4,600 ft) high ridge near Mount Mageik, partly overlapping the much older Alagogshak volcano. The summit has a 300-metre (980 ft) diameter crater, containing fumaroles and sometimes a crater lake. A large lava flow extends from the mountain to fill the upper part of Angle Creek's valley with about five cubic kilometers of material. There have been no significant eruptions from Martin, but the summit emits steam and the volcano is the site of earthquake swarms. Mageik stands on the same sedimentary rocks as Martin. The composite structure has four vents, the highest at 7,103 feet (2,165 m) and three subsidiary vent cones. A small crater holds a lake and fumaroles on the highest cone's flank. Apart from steaming there has been no recent activity, but there was a large debris avalanche in 1912, probably associated with the eruption of Katmai, amounting to between 0.05 and 0.10 cubic kilometers in volume. Fourpeaked Mountain is a stratovolcano with a probable vent at the summit. Much of the 6,903-foot (2,104 m) mountain is covered by Fourpeaked Glacier. Fourpeaked Glacier produced phreatic eruptions in September 2006.

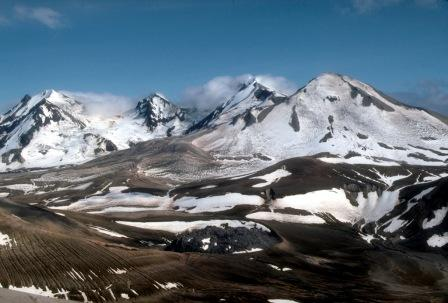
Trident volcano

Mount Griggs is a 7,602-foot (2,317 m) stratovolcano near Novarupta, and somewhat to the northwest of the otherwise straight line of volcanoes in Katmai. The flat-topped mountain has three concentric craters, the largest 1,500 metres (4,900 ft) wide. The mountain's geochemistry differs from its neighbors. Griggs has active sulfurous fumaroles. Snowy Mountain is a small volcano 7,090 feet (2,160 m) tall, with ten significant glaciers covering almost all of the mountain. Roughly a third to half of the mountain has been eroded by glacial action. The volcano has two vents about 4 kilometres (2.5 mi) apart, and active fumaroles at the tallest summit. Mount Denison is a 7,605-foot (2,318 m) peak with four related vents at the head of three glaciers, the tallest point in the park. Mount Kukak is another ice-covered volcano, 6,693 feet (2,040 m) tall. It has a strong fumarole field near the summit. Devils Desk is a heavily eroded stratovolcano, 6,411 feet (1,954 m) high. Kaguyak is a stratovolcano truncated by a caldera, like Katmai. The highest peak is 2,956 feet (901 m), with a 2.5-kilometre (1.6 mi) diameter crater lake. There are two large domes within the caldera and two on the flanks. Mount Douglas is a 7,021-foot (2,140 m) stratovolcano, extensively eroded by ice, with a small acidic crater lake at its summit. 7,454-foot (2,272 m) Mount Steller is located between Kukak and Denison, with an unknown number of vents in ice-covered terrain. Kejulik is a 4,977-foot (1,517 m) eroded volcanic remnant. None of these volcanoes have exhibited significant behavior in historic times.

=== Climate ===
According to the Köppen climate classification system, Katmai National Park and Preserve has a subarctic climate (Dfc) with cool summers and year around precipitation. Dfc climates are defined by their coldest month averaging below 32 °F (0 °C), 1–3 months averaging above 50 °F (10 °C), all months with average temperatures below 71.6 °F (22.0 °C) and no significant precipitation difference between seasons. According to the United States Department of Agriculture, the Plant Hardiness zone at Brooks Falls at 92 feet (28 m) elevation is 3b with an average annual extreme minimum temperature of −30.9 °F (−34.9 °C).

== Ecosystems ==
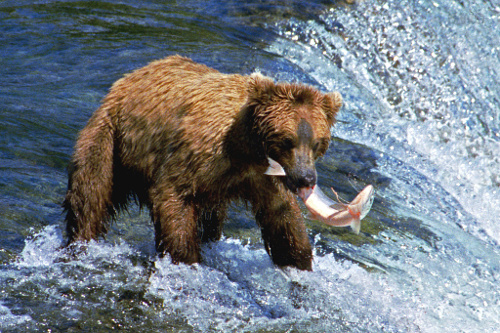
Bear catches salmon at Brooks Falls

Weather at Katmai is variable, though reliably rainy or drizzly. Summer high temperatures average about 63 °F (17 °C) and winter lows are between −4 and 40 °F (−20 and 4 °C). Fall is somewhat drier than the rest of the year, and warm days can occur year-round. Rainfall is heaviest near the coast, with up to 60 inches (150 cm), and lighter to the west. The park supports 29 mammal species, 137 bird species, 24 freshwater fish species and four anadromous fish species.

Mammal species that inhabit Katmai include snowshoe hare, moose, gray wolf, brown bear, coyote, beaver, Canada lynx, wolverine, river otter, American mink, Arctic and red fox species, weasel, porcupine, and marten. Marine mammals include the harbor seal, sea lion, sea otter, beluga whale, killer whale and gray whale. Caribou are occasionally within the park during winter seasons.

The most important fish in the park are sockeye salmon, which feed bears, bald eagles and others during their spawning runs in the park's rivers. Salmon enter the Naknek River drainage from Bristol Bay in June and July and spawn from August to October.

The park also supports a variety of plant communities. Common wildflowers that grow in the park include beachhead iris, nootka lupine, and woolly geranium.

== Activities ==
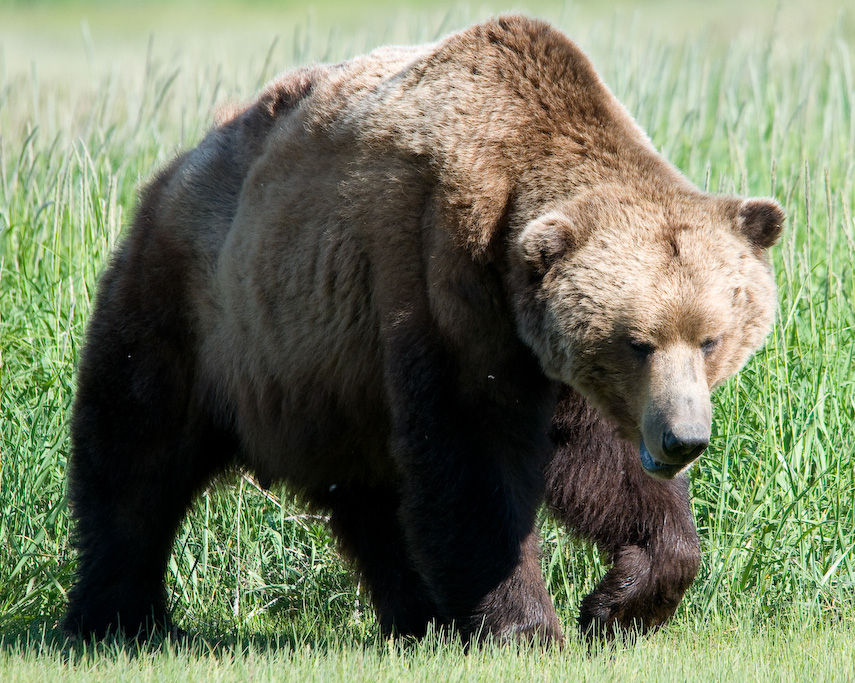
A brown bear in Hallo Bay, Katmai National Park, Alaska

Activities at Katmai include hiking, backpacking, camping, backcountry skiing, fishing, kayaking, boat tours, and interpretive programs.

Katmai is also well known for Alaskan brown bears and the sockeye salmon that attract both bears and people. Katmai contains the world's largest protected brown bear population, estimated to number about 2,200. Bears are especially likely to congregate at the Brooks Falls viewing platform when the salmon are spawning, and many well known photographs of Alaskan brown bears, such as Thomas Mangelsen's Catch of the Day, have been taken there. The salmon arrive early at the falls compared to other streams. Between 43 and 70 individual bears have been documented there in July and in the lower river in September. The coastal areas such as Hallo Bay, Kukak Bay, Kuliak Bay, Kaflia Bay, Geographic Harbor and Chiniak Bay also host very high population densities of bears year-round, due to the availability of clams and edible coastal sedge as well as salmon and other fish. Other hotspots include Swikshak Lagoon, American Creek, and in the preserve, Moraine Creek and Funnel Creek.

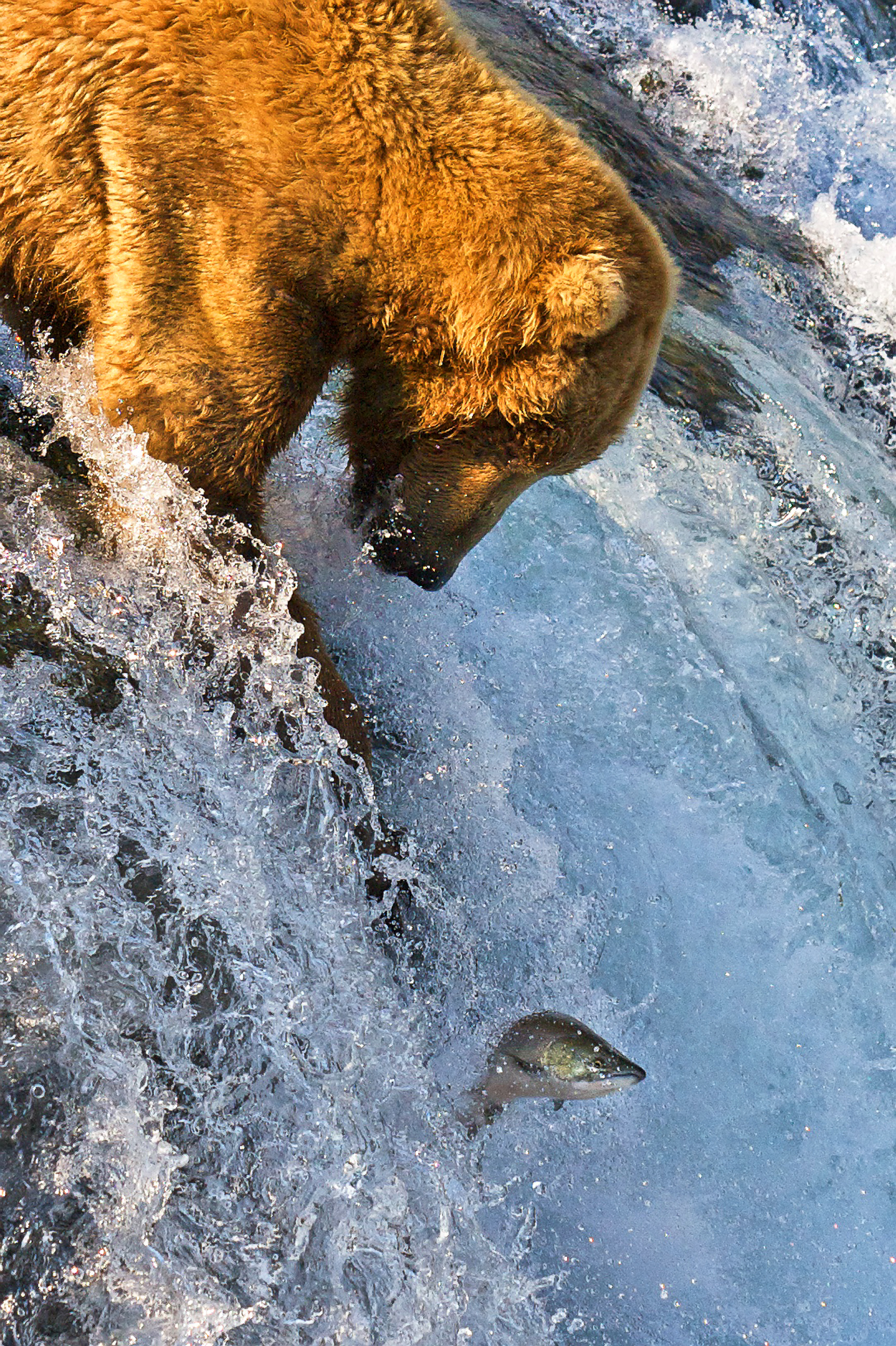
Grizzly bear fishing for salmon at Brooks Falls, Alaska

Most Katmai visitors come to Brooks Camp, one of the developed areas of the park, with few venturing further than the bear-viewing platforms and the immediate vicinity of the camp. Rangers at the park manage bear interactions to ensure bears do not obtain human food or get into conflicts with humans. As a result, bears in Katmai Park exhibit less fear of humans than bears from other regions, allowing humans to approach and photograph them at closer distances. The National Park Service operates webcams of the bears at Brooks Camp. Bear viewing in the Brooks Camp area occurs predominantly in the months of July and September.

Lodging is available in the park at Brooks Camp and Grosvenor Lodge and at several other lodges scattered around the park on inholdings.

=== Fat Bear Week ===
Since 2014, the park has hosted a yearly event called Fat Bear Week, commemorating the bears' yearly preparations for hibernation. The event aims to raise awareness of conservation efforts, and draws over a million votes yearly.

== History ==
=== Precontact period and archaeology ===
Prehistoric artifacts have been found dating to about 6,000 years before the present near the old Katmai village on the park's south coast. A number of other sites have been found along the coast, notably those of Kaguyak and Kukak, with occupation into historic times. Some of these, including sites "49 AF 3" near Kanatak and "49 MK 10", present clear evidence of habitation up to the 1912 eruption, but have not been investigated in detail. The Amalik Bay Archeological District is a major area containing evidence of some of the earliest human activity in the area, with finds dating back more than 7,000 years.

Inland, Brooks Camp is a significant archaeological site dating to about 4500 BP, listed on the National Register of Historic Places (NRHP) in 1977 and designated a National Historic Landmark in 1993. A village abandoned after the 1912 eruption at the mouth of the Savonoski River is documented as the "Old Savonoski Site", while a more extensive district of sites is located near the mouth of the Grosvenor River. The "DIL-161 Site" is located in the watershed of the Alagnak River, and shows evidence of habitation in the first millennium.

=== Russians and Americans ===
Russians were the first Europeans to arrive in the area in significant numbers, trading in furs. They encountered the Aglegmuit Eskimos on the Bristol Bay side of the peninsula and the Koniag Eskimo on the Shelikov Strait side. Katmai Village was the only location within the park where Europeans lived through the mid-19th century, though their numbers were always few. In the latter part of the 19th century a few villages were established inland at Severnosky and along the coast at Douglas and Kukak. American traders operating for the Alaska Commercial Company took the place of the Russians. As sea otters became scarce the trade dried up, and Katmai and Douglas were abandoned in the early 20th century. In the 1890s the region was a route for travelers going to Nome for Nome's short-lived gold rush. Writer Rex Beach was one of these, writing about life on Bristol Bay during the salmon run in The Silver Horde. Prospects for oil, gold and coal received brief attention, then died out by 1912.

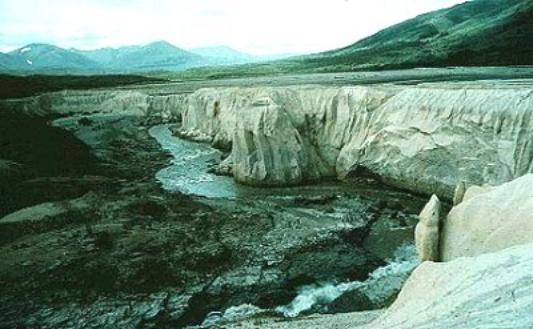
Pyroclastic flow deposits in the Valley of Ten Thousand Smokes

By 1898 there were reports of frequent earthquakes in the vicinity of Katmai Pass. These intensified around June 1, 1912, inducing the few local residents to leave. Katmai and Novarupta erupted on June 6 with a noise heard in Fairbanks, 500 miles (800 km) away, and Juneau, 750 miles (1,210 km) distant. Heavy eruptions continued through June 7, then gradually declined from June 8 onwards. Ash fell 6 to 12 inches (15 to 30 cm) deep in Kodiak, and ash fell on the Alaskan mainland and eastwards as far as Puget Sound. Atmospheric haze was noted worldwide, and temperatures were depressed in the northern hemisphere during the second half of 1912. Initial reports pinpointed Mount Katmai as the center of eruption. Later reports cast doubt on Katmai's primary role, and it was not until 1954 that Novarupta was found to be the primary volcanic center. The region around the mountains, which had received heavy ashfall, was devastated.

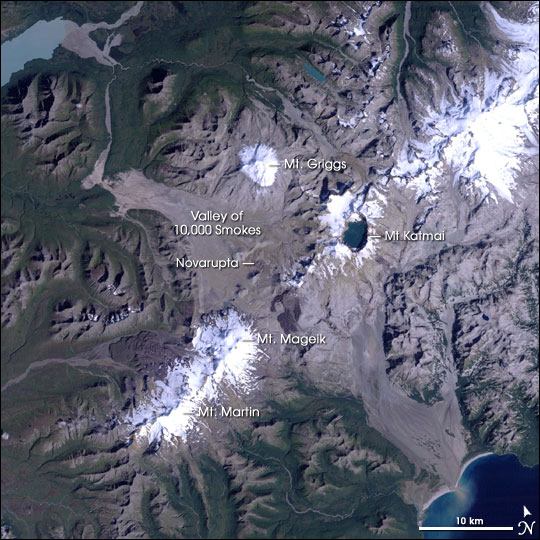
Satellite image of the Valley of Ten Thousand Smokes and surrounding area

The National Geographic Society backed five expeditions to Katmai, beginning in 1915 with a trip to Kodiak Island and a short stay on the mainland. The expedition, led by Robert Fiske Griggs, a botanist who was initially interested in the study of plant recolonization. Griggs' follow-up expedition in 1916 discovered and named the Valley of Ten Thousand Smokes and found Novarupta. The National Geographic Society, delighted with the discoveries, funded a larger expedition in 1917 to make a survey of the region. The subsequent articles published in National Geographic magazine brought the region to prominence in the public, and Griggs began to advocate for the protection of the area in the national park system, backed by the National Geographic Society. At this time legislation to establish Mount McKinley National Park (later renamed Denali National Park) was pending, and the idea of making Katmai a national park was discussed by National Park Service acting director Horace M. Albright and National Geographic Society president Gilbert Hovey Grosvenor. Albright advised that national park legislation was unlikely to pass, suggesting instead that the region be protected as a national monument by the President, using the Antiquities Act of 1906. After some negotiation, and after a 1918 expedition opined that the Valley of Ten Thousand Smokes was a permanent feature, a proclamation was prepared to protect 1,080,000 acres (440,000 ha) around Mount Katmai, the valley, and the most of Iliuk Arm of Naknek Lake. Although only a third of the area of the present park and preserve, the monument was nevertheless half the size of Yellowstone National Park from the outset. President Woodrow Wilson signed the proclamation of Katmai National Monument on September 24, 1918.

=== National monument ===
The proclamation had little immediate effect, other than grumbling from territorial officials. A 1923 expedition found that the region had little exploitable mineral potential. Tourists in the early 1920s amounted to a few dozen. No National Park Service staff were assigned to the site, which was in theory administered by Mount McKinley. By 1928 more visitors arrived. The most prominent among them was Father Bernard R. Hubbard, an explorer of Alaska who gained fame as "The Glacier Priest". Hubbard documented the Valley of Ten Thousand Smokes in movies that he showed at lectures until the 1950s. At the same time, the Park Service became aware that Katmai was among the best habitat for grizzlies in Alaska, and that the monument should be expanded to protect them and the prolific salmon spawning grounds. In 1931 President Herbert Hoover issued a proclamation expanding the monument under the Antiquities Act to 2,697,590 acres (1,091,680 ha), more than doubling it in size and creating the largest single Park Service unit. Crucially, the expanded monument included the falls at Brooks Camp, while avoiding lands along the coast thought to have potential oil deposits.

In 1937 a ranger was finally assigned to Katmai, seconded to the monument from Mount McKinley, spending most of June trying to get there and one day in the monument before returning to Mount McKinley. In 1939 the United States Bureau of Fisheries established an encampment at the Brooks Lake outlet, having previously blasted out part of the falls in 1921. At about the same time the Park Service became concerned about illegal trapping in the monument, asking the Alaska Fish and Game Commission to send wardens to patrol the area. Several trappers were apprehended, and Park Service personnel visited the monument, sending back positive reports on the scenery and wildlife. These reports, and efforts to make poaching more difficult, led to another boundary adjustment that included the islands in the Shelikof Strait and Cook Inlet within 5 miles (8.0 km) of the old boundary, signed by President Franklin D. Roosevelt on August 4, 1941, which increased the monument's area by several thousand acres.

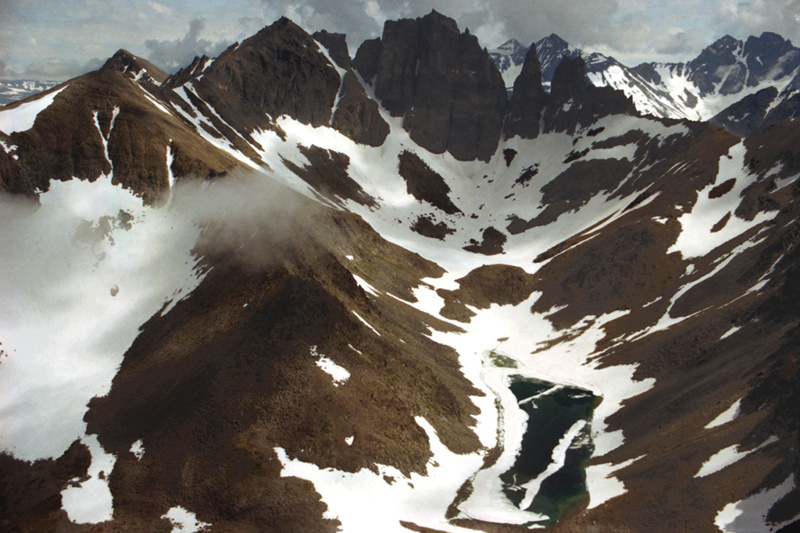
Mountains of the Aleutian Range from a floatplane flying to Brooks Camp

Poaching increased after World War II. At the same time, Alaskan territorial interests sought to have the monument disestablished or reduced in size to allow mining and fishing, because the activity at the Valley of Ten Thousand Smokes had declined, and because the Park Service had made no effort to develop the monument for visitors. These proposals were turned aside, and in 1950 a seasonal ranger was assigned to Katmai. William Nancarrow built a small camp at Brooks River. By the mid-1950s, the Park Service embarked on its Mission 66 program to expand visitor services. Katmai was to receive a headquarters at King Salmon, a visitor center at Valley Junction in the Valley of Ten Thousand Smokes, ranger stations, campgrounds, modest roads and dock facilities on the lakes. An airstrip was also proposed for Brooks Camp. The airstrip was not built, but a road from Brooks Camp to the valley was built. In the early 1960s a road was proposed that would run across the peninsula through the park, connecting to King Salmon. The Park Service was opposed. The 1964 Alaska earthquake stalled the proposal for several years, resurfacing in 1968 with local support. However, the Park Service opposed the plans and the road project was set aside. In the meantime, headquarters facilities were developed at King Salmon. In 1967, the state of Alaska set aside the McNeil River State Game Sanctuary with 85,000 acres (34,000 ha) under protection to safeguard the bear fishing grounds on the river, adjacent to Katmai. McNeil River was declared a National Natural Landmark in 1968.

When George B. Hartzog Jr. became director of the National Park Service in 1964, he commissioned a report on Alaskan public lands, entitled Operation Great Land. The study identified 39 sites that might become preserves or recreation lands, and it recommended that Katmai be expanded somewhat to the west and substantially to the north. The boundary adjustments were amended to a westward expansion of 94,547 acres (38,262 ha) that President Lyndon B. Johnson signed in 1968, producing anger in Alaska. In 1971 Katmai finally gained a full-time, on-site park superintendent. Also in 1971, Congress passed the Alaska Native Claims Settlement Act (ANCSA), which established a framework to divide Alaska's federal lands. ANCSA established a timetable for claims, withdrawals and designations, requiring the Park Service to come up with a plan for future park units. The Park Service proposed 33,000,000 acres (13,000,000 ha) of new park lands, among them a 1,218,490-acre (493,110 ha) expansion of Katmai. Through the mid-1970s a variety of proposals were circulated for expansion and wilderness designation. At the same time, concerns were raised about the withdrawal of game lands from sport hunting, and the ability of local residents to continue to practice subsistence hunting. To address these concerns, legislation was proposed to create national preserve lands that would confer protection while allowing regulated sport hunting. Early versions of the Alaska National Interest Lands Conservation Act (ANILCA) proposed Katmai National Park and Preserve as a combination of park and preserve lands. This legislation was stalled in Congress by 1978. Because a deadline was approaching for state selection of public lands, President Jimmy Carter used his authority under the Antiquities Act to expand Katmai by 1,370,000 acres (550,000 ha) on December 1, 1978, mainly on the northern side of the monument.

=== National park and preserve ===
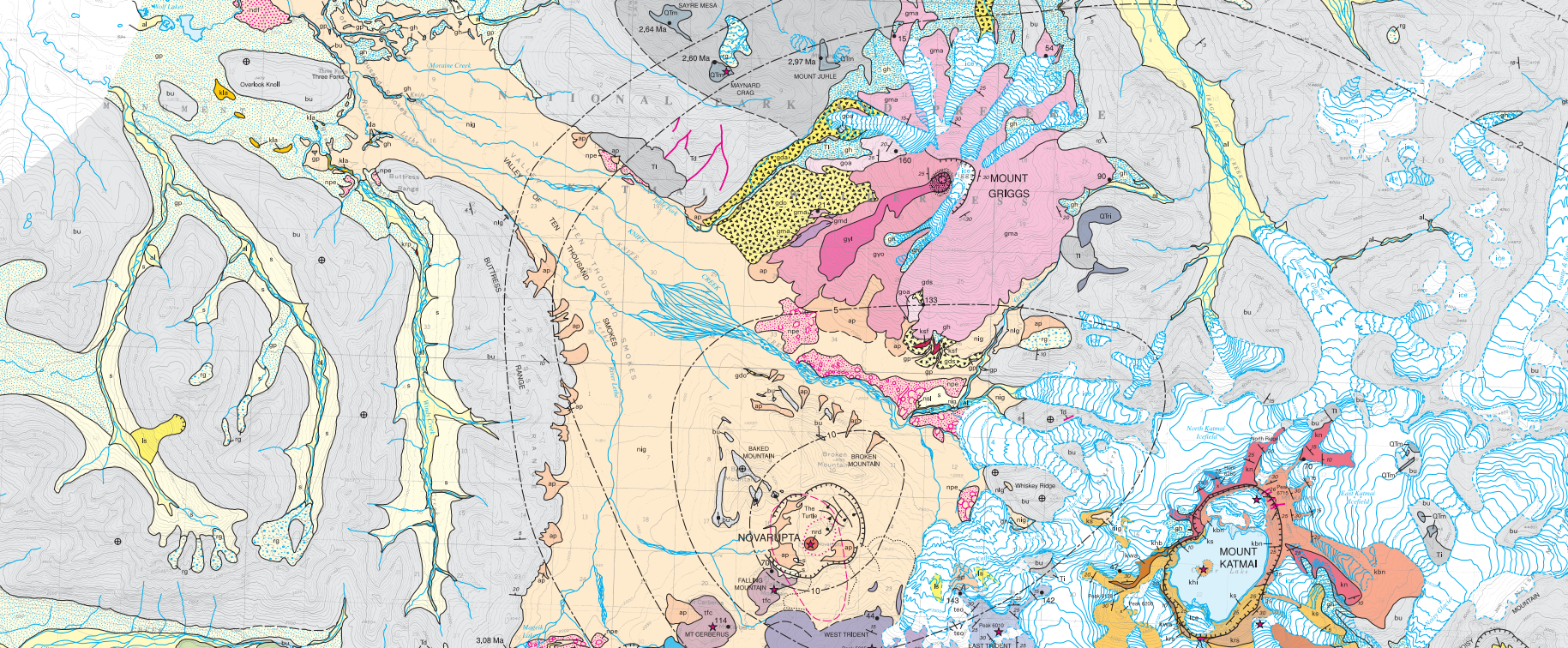
Katmai National Park geological map, where nig is the Episode I valley-filling ignimbrite of June 6–7, 1912, and nrd is the Novarupta rhyolite dome

It took two more years for Congress to act on a final ANILCA bill. On December 2, 1980, the final bill established Katmai National Park and Preserve with 1,037,000 acres (420,000 ha) of additional park, bringing it to 3,674,529.33 acres (1,487,029.26 ha) and 308,000 acres (125,000 ha) of preserve, with 3,384,358 acres (1,369,601 ha) of wilderness lands. Unlike most ANILCA parks, the legislation for Katmai did not grant subsistence hunting access to national park lands, only to the preserve. Sport and subsistence hunting is prohibited in Katmai National Park but allowed in the preserve.

In the 1990s a state game refuge with 120,000 acres (49,000 ha) was established to the north of the sanctuary to protect Chenik Lake, which supported a smaller fish run, attracting bears. The refuge and the expanded 128,000 acres (52,000 ha) sanctuary have remained closed to hunting, despite an unsuccessful 2005 attempt by Governor Frank Murkowski and again in 2007 by Sarah Palin's Board of Game. Recently there have been proposals to merge the sanctuary and refuge into Katmai.

== Environmental issues ==
=== Exxon Valdez oil spill ===
The grounding of the oil tanker Exxon Valdez in Prince William Sound on March 24, 1989, produced extensive contamination of the Katmai coastline. By early April, oil had reached Kenai Fjords National Park. Oil reached Cape Douglas in Katmai on April 26 and points southwards in the following week. In early May, a variety of dredges and skimmer vessels were working in the Shelikof Strait, but 90% of the Katmai coastline was oiled. The worst-hit areas were Cape Chiniak and Chiniak Lagoon, Hallo Bay Beach and its lagoon, Cape Gull and Kaflia Bay, and Cape Douglas. Casualties in birds alone were estimated at 8,400 dead birds. Work resumed in 1990, with smaller efforts in 1991 to catch the last oil.

== Administrative ==
The superintendent of Katmai is also responsible for Aniakchak National Monument and Preserve and Alagnak Wild River.

=== List of superintendents ===
- Gilbert E. Blinn 3/1971 – 6/1979
- Roy M. Sanborn (acting) 6/1979 – 9/1979
- David K. Morris 9/1979 – 4/1987
- James R. Pepper (acting) 7/1987 – 8/1987
- Gilbert R. (Ray) Bane 8/1987 – 3/1990
- James F. Ryan (acting) 3/1990 – 6/1990
- Alan D. Eliason 6/1990 – 7/1993
- Will Tipton (acting) 8/1993-12/1993
- William Pierce 12/1993 – 1998 (moved to Anchorage in 1996)
- Deborah O. Liggett 10/1998 – 7/2003
- Joe Fowler (acting) 8/2003 – 11/2003
- Joe Fowler 11/2003 – 4/2005
- Steve Frye 6/2005– 3/2006
- Troy Hamon (acting) 4/2006 – 7/2006
- Ralph Moore 7/2006 – 10/2012
- Diane Chung 2013 – 2016
- Karen Bradford 2016 – 2017
- Mark Sturm 2017 – Present

== See also ==
- List of national parks of the United States
- National Register of Historic Places listings in Katmai National Park and Preserve
- Timothy Treadwell

== Bibliography ==
- Norris, Frank B. (1996) Isolated Paradise: An Administrative History of the Katmai and Aniakchak NPS Units, Alaska, National Park Service
