= King Salmon, Alaska =

Census-designated place in Alaska

- CDP
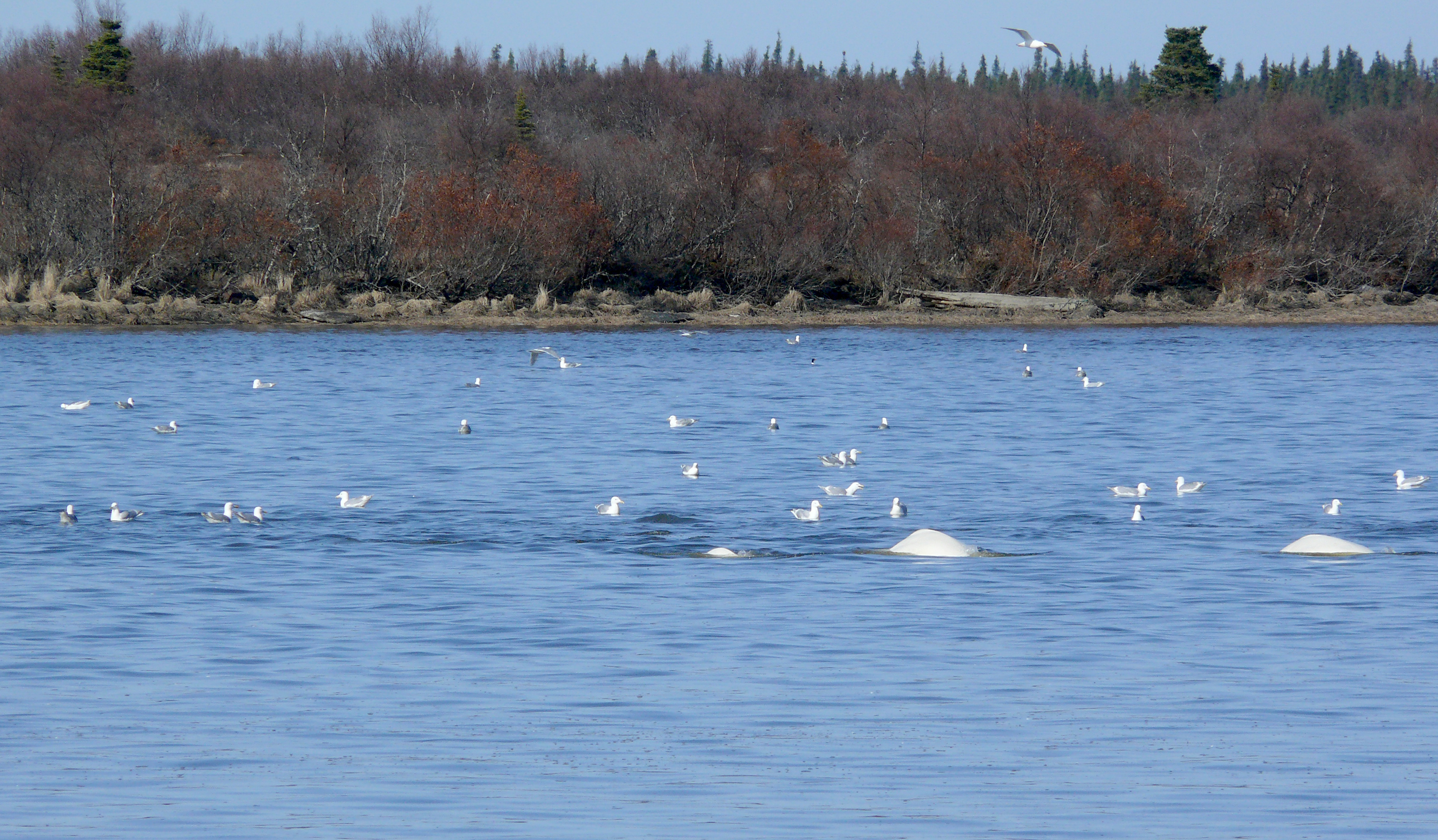
- Naknek River in King Salmon

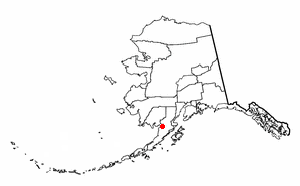
- Location of King Salmon, Alaska
- Coordinates: 58°40′59″N 156°40′13″W
- Country: United States
- State: Alaska
- Borough: Bristol Bay

Government
  - Borough mayor: David R. Lax
  - State senator: Lyman Hoffman (D)
  - State rep.: Bryce Edgmon (I)

Area
  - Total: 169.66 sq mi (439.41 km^{2})
  - Land: 168.21 sq mi (435.65 km^{2})
  - Water: 1.45 sq mi (3.76 km^{2})

Population (2020)
  - Total: 307
  - Density: 1.8/sq mi (0.7/km^{2})
- Time zone: UTC−9 (Alaska (AKST))
  - Summer (DST): UTC−8 (AKDT)
- ZIP code: 99613
- Area code: 907
- FIPS code: 02-39630

King Salmon is a census-designated place (CDP) in Bristol Bay Borough in the U.S. state of Alaska. It is 284 miles (457 km) southwest of Anchorage. As of the 2020 census the population was 307, down from 374 in 2010. It is home to the headquarters of Katmai National Park and Preserve. King Salmon is the borough seat of neighboring Lake and Peninsula Borough, but does not serve that purpose in its own borough, whose borough seat is in Naknek.

== Geography ==
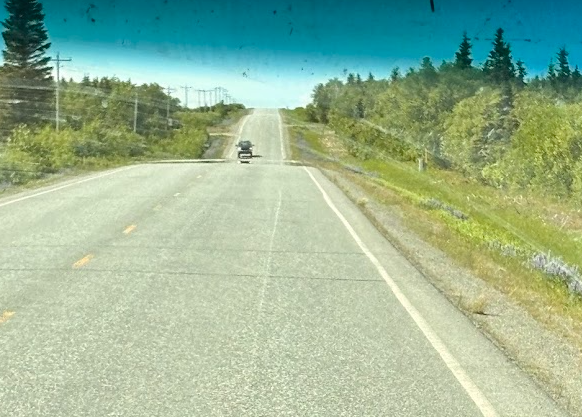
The Alaska Peninsula Highway in King Salmon

King Salmon is on the north bank of the Naknek River on the Alaska Peninsula, about 16 mi (26 km) upriver from Naknek, near Naknek Lake. According to the United States Census Bureau, the CDP has an area of 171.0 square miles (443 km^{2}), of which, 169.6 square miles (439 km^{2}) is land and 1.4 square miles (3.6 km^{2}) (0.82%) is water.

=== Climate ===
Climate chart for King Salmon

King Salmon has a subarctic climate (Köppen Dfc) even though it is at 58° North. Temperatures, especially extreme ones, are much less moderate than in the subpolar oceanic climate of the Pacific Ocean side of the Alaska Peninsula; however, average temperatures in winter are still milder than some locations in the coterminous United States, such as Fargo, North Dakota. The town lies just below the southern limit of sporadic permafrost in Alaska, and is strongly sheltered from the extremely wet Aleutian Low which drops most of its moisture on the opposite (eastern) side of the mountains. It is a lot colder than fellow west-coast climates of Europe on the same latitude due to the influence of the Siberian High on Bering Sea surface temperatures. In summer, King Salmon catches up to similar latitudes in the British Isles, where the difference is much stronger in winter. The area remains quite a bit colder year round than around the Baltic Sea in a similar west-facing location.

The warmest temperature recorded is 89 °F (32 °C) in July 2019 and the coldest is −48 °F (−44 °C) in January 1989. Winter days are sometimes very cold due to winds from the interior during cold waves. The coldest daily maximum measured was −34 °F (−37 °C), also in January 1989. During the 1991–2020 normals, the coldest daily maximum averaged −12 °F (−24 °C). Warm summer nights are a rarity, although 65 °F (18 °C) was recorded in August 1919. The warmest low in a regular year averages a modest 55 °F (13 °C).

Climate data for King Salmon, Alaska (King Salmon Airport), 1991–2020 normals, extremes 1917–present
Month	Jan	Feb	Mar	Apr	May	Jun	Jul	Aug	Sep	Oct	Nov	Dec	Year
Record high °F (°C)	53 (12)	57 (14)	59 (15)	69 (21)	85 (29)	88 (31)	89 (32)	84 (29)	76 (24)	67 (19)	56 (13)	54 (12)	89 (32)
Mean maximum °F (°C)	44.2 (6.8)	44.8 (7.1)	46.7 (8.2)	57.4 (14.1)	70.3 (21.3)	75.5 (24.2)	77.9 (25.5)	74.6 (23.7)	65.9 (18.8)	56.6 (13.7)	47.6 (8.7)	44.4 (6.9)	79.6 (26.4)
Mean daily maximum °F (°C)	23.5 (−4.7)	29.5 (−1.4)	31.8 (−0.1)	44.5 (6.9)	55.2 (12.9)	62.1 (16.7)	64.6 (18.1)	63.3 (17.4)	56.3 (13.5)	43.8 (6.6)	31.9 (−0.1)	25.7 (−3.5)	44.3 (6.8)
Daily mean °F (°C)	16.6 (−8.6)	22.1 (−5.5)	23.5 (−4.7)	36.0 (2.2)	45.6 (7.6)	52.8 (11.6)	56.7 (13.7)	55.7 (13.2)	48.7 (9.3)	36.4 (2.4)	25.0 (−3.9)	18.6 (−7.4)	36.5 (2.5)
Mean daily minimum °F (°C)	9.8 (−12.3)	14.7 (−9.6)	15.2 (−9.3)	27.6 (−2.4)	36.1 (2.3)	43.5 (6.4)	48.9 (9.4)	48.0 (8.9)	41.0 (5.0)	29.0 (−1.7)	18.2 (−7.7)	11.4 (−11.4)	28.6 (−1.9)
Mean minimum °F (°C)	−22.5 (−30.3)	−17.6 (−27.6)	−10.8 (−23.8)	8.4 (−13.1)	24.9 (−3.9)	32.3 (0.2)	38.7 (3.7)	34.5 (1.4)	24.6 (−4.1)	8.9 (−12.8)	−7.6 (−22.0)	−18.8 (−28.2)	−29.5 (−34.2)
Record low °F (°C)	−48 (−44)	−43 (−42)	−42 (−41)	−19 (−28)	4 (−16)	27 (−3)	31 (−1)	25 (−4)	15 (−9)	−12 (−24)	−28 (−33)	−38 (−39)	−48 (−44)
Average precipitation inches (mm)	0.93 (24)	0.91 (23)	0.76 (19)	1.04 (26)	1.44 (37)	1.83 (46)	2.46 (62)	3.26 (83)	3.40 (86)	2.31 (59)	1.72 (44)	1.38 (35)	21.44 (545)
Average snowfall inches (cm)	8.6 (22)	7.2 (18)	7.2 (18)	4.4 (11)	0.6 (1.5)	0.0 (0.0)	0.0 (0.0)	0.0 (0.0)	0.0 (0.0)	2.5 (6.4)	6.7 (17)	10.2 (26)	47.4 (120)
Average extreme snow depth inches (cm)	5.4 (14)	5.4 (14)	4.6 (12)	2.7 (6.9)	0.1 (0.25)	0.0 (0.0)	0.0 (0.0)	0.0 (0.0)	0.0 (0.0)	1.4 (3.6)	3.4 (8.6)	6.3 (16)	9.4 (24)
Average precipitation days (≥ 0.01 in)	10.0	10.1	9.2	10.8	12.3	14.4	16.2	17.1	18.0	14.7	13.2	12.9	158.9
Average snowy days (≥ 0.1 in)	8.2	8.3	8.1	4.8	0.7	0.0	0.0	0.0	0.1	2.7	7.4	9.9	50.2
Average relative humidity (%)	75.9	72.8	72.8	71.8	70.2	73.5	77.5	79.7	78.8	79.3	81.0	76.7	75.8
Average dew point °F (°C)	9.1 (−12.7)	7.9 (−13.4)	15.1 (−9.4)	22.6 (−5.2)	32.4 (0.2)	40.8 (4.9)	46.8 (8.2)	46.9 (8.3)	40.5 (4.7)	26.6 (−3.0)	17.8 (−7.9)	10.2 (−12.1)	26.4 (−3.1)
Source: NOAA (relative humidity and dew point 1961–1990)

== Demographics ==
Historical population
Census	Pop.	Note	%±
1960	227		—
1970	202		−11.0%
1980	545		169.8%
1990	696		27.7%
2000	442		−36.5%
2010	374		−15.4%
2020	307		−17.9%
U.S. Decennial Census

King Salmon first appeared on the 1960 U.S. Census as an unincorporated village. It was made a census-designated place (CDP) as of the 1980 census.

As of the census of 2000, there were 442 people, 196 households, and 105 families residing in the CDP. The population density was 2.6 inhabitants per square mile (1.0/km^{2}). There were 343 housing units at an average density of 2.0 units per square mile (0.77 units/km^{2}). The racial makeup of the CDP was 66.29% White, 1.13% Black or African American, 28.96% Native American, 0.23% Asian (i.e. 1 person), 0.23% from other races, and 3.17% from two or more races. 0.45% of the population were Hispanic or Latino of any race.

There were 196 households, out of which 30.1% had children under the age of 18 living with them, 44.4% were married couples living together, 4.6% had a female householder with no husband present, and 46.4% were non-families. 41.3% of all households were made up of individuals, and 1.5% had someone living alone who was 65 years of age or older. The average household size was 2.26 and the average family size was 3.17.

In the CDP, the population was spread out, with 26.2% under the age of 18, 7.0% from 18 to 24, 35.7% from 25 to 44, 28.1% from 45 to 64, and 2.9% who were 65 years of age or older. The median age was 38 years. For every 100 females, there were 122.1 males. For every 100 females age 18 and over, there were 131.2 males.

The median income for a household in the CDP was $54,375, and the median income for a family was $64,375. Males had a median income of $45,000 versus $35,500 for females. The per capita income for the CDP was $26,755. About 8.8% of families and 12.4% of the population were below the poverty line, including 17.5% of those under age 18 and none of those age 65 or over.

== Parks ==
- Katmai National Park and Preserve

== History ==
In the 1930s, the U.S. government built an air navigation silo at the site of present-day King Salmon. At the beginning of World War II, the U.S. Army Air Forces built an air base around the silo. It was maintained by the Civil Aeronautics Administration throughout the war.

In the 1940s and 1950s, the U.S. Army Corps of Engineers constructed a 25 km (16 mi) long road from King Salmon to Naknek. Other government agencies, such as the National Park Service, Alaska Department of Fish and Game, and the United States Weather Bureau, built facilities at King Salmon. The King Salmon Inn opened in 1956.

King Salmon is now a government, transportation, and service and shipment center for the commercial red salmon and sport fishing industries.

The Air Force base closed in 1994, and is kept in caretaker status (mothballed) by Anchorage-based Chugach Federal Solutions, Inc. King Salmon Airport is now a public access airport.

King Salmon is one of the sites of Super Dual Auroral Radar Network.

In 2010, a local National Weather Service employee and his wife were involved in a domestic terrorism plot that had proceeded to the operational phase. A hit list of 20 people that included media and military personnel was found.
