= David T. Griggs =

American geophysicist (1911–1974)

David Tressel Griggs
- Born: 6 October 1911; Columbus, Ohio US
- Died: 31 December 1974 (aged 63); Snowmass, Colorado US
- Resting place: Mount Griggs, Alaska US
- Education: Ohio State University, (AB, AM)
- Occupations: Professor of Geophysics, UCLA
- Spouse: Helen
- Children: two
- Parent(s): Robert Fiske Griggs; Laura Amelia Tressel Griggs
- Awards: Purple Heart; Medal for Merit; Air Force Exceptional Service Award

David Tressel Griggs (6 October 1911 – 31 December 1974) was an American geophysicist. He served as the second Chief Scientist of the U.S. Air Force from 1951 to 1952.

== Early life ==
David Griggs was born in Columbus, Ohio. His father was Robert Fiske Griggs, who discovered the Valley of Ten Thousand Smokes near Mount Katmai in Alaska. The highest area in this area was officially named Mount Griggs in his honor. David accompanied his father on an expedition to that area in 1930.

At age 24, Griggs had an accident while mountain climbing in the Caucasus Mountains, located between the Caspian and Black Seas. He suffered compound fractures in both legs and a dislocated knee; this rendered him physically ineligible for military service during World War II.

== War service ==
=== Radar development at MIT ===
In 1941, Griggs left his academic geology position at Harvard to join the MIT Radiation Laboratory, the center of American microwave radar development. His first assignment involved testing newly developed ground-based radar tracking systems; he subsequently worked on air-to-air radar development, serving as program manager. His talent for making laboratory equipment function under operational conditions was quickly recognized, leading to his appointment as special assistant for scientific matters to the Secretary of War.

=== The Lovett mission and H2X advocacy ===
In spring 1943, Griggs accompanied Assistant Secretary of War for Air Robert A. Lovett on a fact-finding mission to Britain to study Allied blind-bombing methods. The mission discovered that British H2S radar production faced serious difficulties and that the U.S. Eighth Air Force could not obtain enough sets for its planned operations. Drawing on his knowledge of developments at the Radiation Laboratory, Griggs drafted a report that fundamentally shaped American bombing strategy. He warned that cloud cover over Germany would make visual bombing impossible ninety percent of the time during winter, and argued that radar bombing was essential for the strategic air campaign. His advocacy helped launch the "crash program" to develop and deploy the American three-centimeter H2X radar (nicknamed "Mickey" by aircrews), which became the centerpiece of the American bombing campaign.

=== Field advisory work in Europe ===
Griggs arrived in England in autumn 1943 to follow the operational debut of H2X and advise commanders on its capabilities. The inaugural H2X combat mission took place on 3 November 1943 against the Wilhelmshaven docks, a target that eight previous visual bombing missions had failed to hit. By year's end, the dozen H2X-equipped aircraft were leading ninety percent of American bombing missions, and total bomb tonnage dropped using radar in the last two months of 1943 surpassed the amount dropped by visual sighting over the entire year.

Griggs was wounded during a combat mission over northern Italy when his aircraft was struck by a 20-mm shell from an enemy fighter, earning him a Purple Heart. In early 1944, he accompanied fact-finding missions through Italy and North Africa with other advisors, meeting with senior commanders including Generals Jimmy Doolittle and Earle E. Partridge.

Air Force commanders considered Griggs indispensable for radar bombing operations. When Lieutenant General Ira Eaker, commanding the Mediterranean Allied Air Forces, sought help establishing the Fifteenth Air Force's pathfinder program, General Carl Spaatz noted that Griggs was "probably the best man to determine what periods of time he should spend with each Air Force." Eaker wrote that he was "disappointed" when informed Griggs might not remain in his theater, arguing that the Strategic Air Forces should use Griggs to ensure both the Eighth and Fifteenth Air Forces achieved efficiency in pathfinder operations.

In March 1944, General Spaatz formally established the Advisory Specialist Group (ASG), attached to the United States Strategic Air Forces, partly to regularize the consultant services Griggs had been providing. Griggs was listed among the initial specialists, with responsibility for H2X radar, alongside Radiation Laboratory director Lee DuBridge and physicist Louis Ridenour.

=== Pacific theater ===
In May 1945, Griggs was released from European duties to establish the Advisory Specialist Group for the Far East Air Forces (FEAF). Following Japan's surrender, he participated in preliminary intelligence missions to Japan with MIT president Karl Compton and others.

== Postwar government service ==
David Griggs helped form the RAND Corporation in 1947. As the Air Force chief scientist from 1951 to 1952, he supported development of the thermonuclear (or fusion) bomb, with other scientists such as Edward Teller and Luis Walter Alvarez. During that time, the chairman of the General Advisory Committee, J. Robert Oppenheimer, opposed it, hoping to restrain a predicted worldwide nuclear proliferation. Griggs was one of those whose testimony caused the Personnel Security Board's vote to suspend Oppenheimer's security clearance in 1954, which caused several physicists to consider Griggs as the "Judas who had betrayed their god."

Griggs accompanied US Army General William Westmoreland through three extended trips to Vietnam in the mid 1960s.

== Awards ==
Griggs was a civilian non-combatant in a tactical mission over northern Italy during World War II. He was hit by a 20-mm shell from an enemy plane. After recovering from the wound, he received a Purple Heart.

For his contributions during the war, President Harry S. Truman presented him a Medal for Merit, the citation reading:

DR. DAVID GRIGGS, For exceptionally meritorious conduct in the performance of outstanding services as H2X Project Officer in the Eighth Air Force during the period 1 May 1943 to 1 April 1944. Dr. Griggs rendered invaluable service in connection with H2X equipment and instructing personnel to operate this equipment. Through his tireless efforts and outstanding leadership he made a substantial contribution to the heavy bombardment operations performed by the Eighth Air Force. The professional skill and the devotion to duty displayed by Dr. Griggs reflect the highest credit upon himself and the Armed Forces of the United States.

Griggs received the Walter H. Bucher Medal of the American Geophysical Union in 1970.

He received the Arthur L. Day Medal of the Geological Society of America in 1973.

Griggs was awarded two UD Air Force Exceptional Service Awards (1953, 1972).

== Death ==
Griggs suffered a fatal heart attack during a ski trip to Snowmass, Colorado in late 1974. His ashes were buried near those of his parents at a site on Mount Griggs in Alaska. The ashes of his daughter Nicola Andron, who died in childbirth a few months after her father's death, were also buried there.

== Sources ==
- Christie, John M. (22 January 1976). "Memorial to David Tressel Griggs: 1911-1974" (PDF). Geological Society of America Memorials. 7. The Geological Society of America: 1–5.
- Buderi, Robert (1996). The Invention that Changed the World: How a Small Group of Radar Pioneers Won the Second World War and Launched a Technological Revolution. New York: Simon & Schuster.
- Guerlac, Henry E. (1987). Radar in World War II. Vol. 2. New York: American Institute of Physics. ISBN 0-88318-486-9.
- Getting, Ivan A.; Christie, John M. (1994). "David Tressel Griggs" (PDF). Biographical Memoirs. 64. Washington, D.C.: National Academies Press: 112–133.
