= Tartarus Colles =

Colles on Mars

Tartarus Colles based on THEMIS day-time image

Tartarus Colles are a group of knobby hills in the northern plains of Mars.

== Context ==
Tartarus Colles runs from 8° to 33° north latitude and 170° to 200° west longitude. They were named after a classic albedo feature. The name was officially approved by the IAU in 1985. The term "Colles" is used for small hills or knobs.

There are over 40,000 knobs associated with Tartarus Colles.

This landform is located within the Diacria quadrangle of Mars.

== Geology ==
Some researchers have proposed that the knobs of western Tartarus Colles are consistent with concurrent interpretations of knobs in Cerberus Palus (downstream of Athabasca Valles), which would suggest that they formed as the result of interactions between lava and water to form what has been termed by some authors as volcanic rootless constructs (VRC). This class of lava-water interactions includes rootless cones, but have fewer genetic implications in their definition, as are not necessarily phreatomagmatic (resulting from the explosion of steam from the sudden evaporation of fluids on contact with lava). The water source is not required to have been added en masse in the form of some aqueous flood - instead possibly being available in the form of an extremely thin and shallow ground ice reservoir whose presence and extent is controlled by obliquity as an orbital forcer.

== Observational history ==
In 2008, Mark A. Bishop of the Planetary Science Institute and the University of South Australia reported on his results using higher-order neighbor analysis to attempt to discern any kind of pattern in the distribution of Tartarus Colles' knobs. The purpose of the study was to reconcile competing hypotheses as to the origin of these knobby landforms, which had been analogized by other authors to putative pingoes and rootless cones in Athabasca Valles and elsewhere in Elysium Planitia. Bishop found the cones of Tartarus Colles to exhibit a complete spatial randomness except where solifluction or magmatic effects were readily apparent.

In 2011, Christopher W. Hamilton and Sarah A. Fagents of the University of Hawaiʻi at Mānoa in Honolulu, Hawaii, and Thorvaldur Thordarson of the University of Edinburgh in Scotland reported on the results of their geomorphic mapping, lava thickness estimations, and statistical analyses (nearest neighbor modeling) to investigate the hypotheses that the cones of Tartarus Colles are what the authors have termed "volcanic rootless constructs" - a more generalized variation of the term "rootless cone" that does not explicitly require a phreatomagmatic origin, or any clear explosive expression such as a pseudocrater. The authors criticize the tendency to generalize Martian pseudocrater analogies against Mývatn, the Icelandic lake, which has been used as a type example of structures arising on Mars from water-lava interactions in a way that ignores the variability of such structures even across Iceland.

== Gallery ==
Tartarus Colles as seen by THEMIS. Click on image to see dark slope streaks

Tartarus Colles channel, as seen by HiRISE. Scale bar is 500 meters. Click on image to see bridge across channel.
