= Athabasca Valles =

Outflow channel on Mars

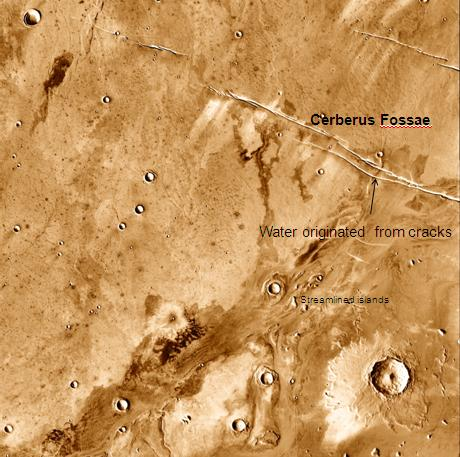
- The Athabasca Valles, showing the flow direction of what are interpreted by some researchers to be floodwater-related morphologies. Note streamlined islands which show direction of flow to southwest.
- Coordinates: 8.6°N 205.0°W
- Length: 285.0 km (177.1 mi)
- Naming: River in Canada. (Changed from Athabasca Vallis.)

The Athabasca Valles are a late Amazonian-period outflow channel system in the central Elysium Planitia region of Mars, located to the south of the Elysium Rise. They are part of a network of outflow channels in this region that are understood to emanate from large fissures in the Martian surface rather than the chaos terrains that source the circum-Chryse outflow channels. The Athabasca Valles in particular emanate from one of the Cerberus Fossae fissures and flow downstream to the southwest, constrained to the south by a wrinkle ridge for over 100 km, before debouching into the Cerberus Palus volcanic plain. The Athabasca Valles are widely understood to be the youngest outflow channel system on the planet.

Although researchers generally agree that the valley was formed by the catastrophic outpouring from the southernmost Cerberus Fossae fissure, the scientific community has not reached a consensus on the precise formation mechanism behind the Athabasca Valles – both in the nature of the fluids that tracked through the valley, and in terms of later geologic events that have since resurfaced the region. Researchers concurrently propose a floodwater origin (akin to the Missoula Floods that formed the Channeled Scablands of Washington state), a low-viscosity lava origin (similar to the pāhoehoe flows of Hawaiʻi), a glacial origin, or some combination of the aforementioned mechanisms. The presence of pitted mounds on the valley floor has also been subject to debate and underpins the different hypotheses that have been proposed, and have variably been suggested to be pingoes and rootless cones. Polygonal terrains of varying scales observed in the Athabasca Valles and downstream in Cerberus Palus have been proposed to have both and/or either volcanic and periglacial features. Interpretations on these terrains differ strongly even with respect to in what order these features superpose other events in the valley.

== Context ==
The Athabasca Valles system lies to the south of the Albor Tholus peak of the Elysium volcanic province, the second most significant volcanic province on the planet Mars. It lies within the southern Martian highlands in a diffuse part of the planet's crustal dichotomy. It is a valley that trends northeast–southwest at the southernmost end of the Elysium province. Cerberus Fossae exists uphill to the northeast of the easternmost part of the valley and score the terrain in a perpendicular direction to the Athabasca Valles' trend. Downstream to the southwest of the valley system lies the Cerberus Palus plain. The outflow channel's route during its formation likely followed a pre-existing southwest-trending pathway, as it is bounded to the south by a wrinkle ridge associated with compressive stresses emanating from the Elysium volcanic province. It emanates from its source at Cerberus Fossae in two channels that converge approximately 25 km southwest of the fissure; after a further 80 km, the valley becomes distributary, with some of its offshoots breaching the south-bounding wrinkle ridge. Geomorphic evidence of valley-affiliated deposits disappears at its southwestern end under recent lava flows. The materials forming the valley floor of the system are thought to be ultramafic or mafic in composition, characterized by an abundance of Fe and a relative dearth of K and Th based on data from the Gamma Ray Spectrometer (GRS). Some aeolian exhumation is observed to have resurfaced the floor. Furthermore, large-scale extension and compression are evident in the Athabasca Valles floor unit, which may have been associated with earlier regional tectonic events or the emptying of an underlying magma chamber. The volcanic unit proposed to compose the floor of the Athabasca Valles (among other terrains) is hypothesized by some researchers to be the youngest and largest flood-emplaced lava unit on Mars, and the only instance of a flood lava unit that displays morphological evidence of turbulent flow. In total, the areal extent of the debouched lava flows that formed the Athabasca Valles system have been mapped as covering a region reaching completely across Elysium Planitia to the south, indistinctly disappearing into the northern margin of Zephyria Planum and stretching across a wide swath of Cerberus Palus in the east–west sense, canvassing a region nearly as wide as the Elysium Rise. This flood lava unit is as large as Oregon and is of a greater areal extent than the largest of the large igneous provinces on Earth – the Deccan and Rajamundry Traps of southern India. A knobby terrain lies to the northwest of the debouchment of the Athabasca Valles and has been dated by crater counting to be the oldest extant geologic unit in the Athabasca Valles system, and is Noachian in age. Modern extensional near-source faulting associated with southern Cerberus Fossae has been found to postdate the formation of all features in the valley, and are likely the most geologically recent features of the Athabasca Valles system.

The Athabasca Valles are located within the broader Elysium Planitia region and cross-cuts a vast swath of plains land interpreted to be composed largely of flood basalts. The outflow channels of central Elysium Planitia are distinguished from those of circum-Chryse region (Kasei Valles, Ares Vallis, etc.) because they appear to emanate from volcanic fissures rather than chaos terrain. The Athabasca Valles are the westernmost of the outflow channels in Elysium Planitia and the only one of the channel systems in this region that flows westwards. The other major outflow channels in this region are (from west to east) the Grjotá Valles, the Rahway Valles, and Marte Vallis. Historically, some researchers have associated the outpouring of fluid from the Athabasca Valles with the downstream formations of Marte Vallis and the Grjotá Valles, but this perspective fell out of favor as higher-resolution MOC data became available, allowing updated crater counts (the age dates of each valley floor are asynchronous) and geomorphic interpretations (high-permeability fresh lava rock would have caused large-scale infiltration of errant floodwaters long before reaching the other valleys' heads).

Of the outflow channels on Mars, the Athabasca Valles have been of particular interest to the Martian planetary geological community as crater age estimates suggest that the outflow channel might have formed as recently as 20 Ma – the youngest-known of its kind on Mars – assuming the embaying lava units (upon which the crater dating was performed) were deposited contemporaneously with the outflow channel's formation. Explanations of its formation would allow researchers to better constrain the hydrological conditions in this region of Mars well into the late Amazonian, long after most hydrological activity on the Martian surface is canonically thought to have ceased. The most recent flood to pass through the Athabasca Valles may have done so as recently as 2–8 Ma.

Around 80% of the craters in the Athabasca Valles are secondary craters from the impact that created Zunil crater, which is the youngest-known +10 km-diameter rayed crater on the Martian surface and a candidate source of the shergottite meteorites that have been found on Earth. The presence of these modern secondaries was initially thought to have skewed the very modern age dates based on crater counts on the Athabasca Valles floor. Zunil Crater is located due east of the Athabasca Valles network, extending along the southeastern trend beyond the Cerberus Fossae fissures. Secondaries from nearby Corinto crater, another very young large rayed crater in Zunil's neighborhood, are also suspected to superpose the Athabasca Valles valley floor, but the morphologies of these secondaries are uncertain and their alignment with the rays of Corinto might be coincidental.

The Athabasca Valles are named for the Athabasca River, which runs through Jasper National Park in the Canadian province of Alberta. It was initially named "Athabasca Vallis" (singular form). The International Astronomical Union officially approved the feature's name in 1997.

== Geographic features ==
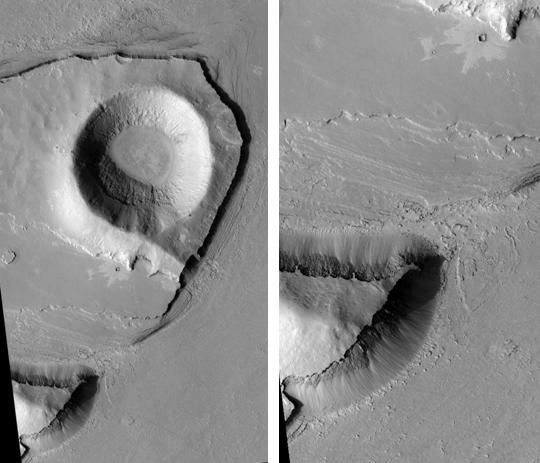
A streamlined form in the Athabasca Valles, as seen by HiRISE. Such morphological features are interpreted to have been formed in megaflood events.

=== Formation ===
There are competing interpretations regarding the formation of the Athabasca Valles system. The different hypotheses and supporting and competing evidences are described below.

==== Megaflooding formation hypothesis ====
The Athabasca Valles are the youngest of the outflow channel systems on Mars, and has historically been understood to have formed as the result of megaflooding. Distinctive streamlined teardrop-shaped landforms, branching channels, and transverse ripple dunes (interpreted to have formed under water) are all found within the valley system, and are morphologically similar to those found in the Channeled Scablands on Earth in eastern Washington state. The Channeled Scablands were formed during the catastrophic Missoula Floods, a series of megafloods sourced from sudden breaches in ice dams buttressing the Pleistocene-aged glacial Lake Missoula. According to this interpretation, these streamlined landforms were created when passing floodwaters deposited sediment against protruding bedrock outcroppings, such as crater rims or bedrock mesas. (In the case of the Athabasca Valles, the vast majority of such streamlined forms arose around relict bedrock mesas.) The floodwater from the event that formed the Athabasca Valles is thought to have come from Cerberus Fossae at 10°N and 157°E, where groundwater may have been trapped under an ice layer that was fractured when the fossae were created. Because evidence of fluvial erosion is present on both sides of the fissure, some authors have proposed that the outflow of floodwater from Cerberus Fossae was violent, forming a fountain akin to Old Faithful in Yellowstone National Park, which is a geyser in the U.S. state of Wyoming. Some researchers noted as early as on relatively low-resolution data from the Mars Global Surveyor mission that the flooding events thought to have formed the Athabasca Valles were interspersed with the formation of the plains units from lava in certain parts of the outflow channel, with some researchers believing that the floodwater could have been accommodated by significant permeability in the freshly-formed lava rock of Cerberus Palus. The interplay of fresh lavas and floodwaters could be responsible for rootless cones observed near the proposed sink region of the Athabasca Valles within the Cerberus Palus region.

Some researchers have proposed that the formation of the streamlined forms in the Athabasca Valles may have been a result of bedrock obstacles (such as crater rims) persisting in areas of low elevation, where hydrological modeling suggests floodwaters might have ponded. The resulting deposition around these bedrock obstacles would have then been carved again in subsequent megaflooding events, with the only surviving sections of these sedimentary deposits sitting in the regions behind the bedrock obstacles. For some of the upstream streamlined forms of the Athabasca Valles, however, modern topography is not suggestive of a ponding event. Some researchers have proposed that they were regions where this ponding event was possible in the past, but later eruptions of lava from the fissure (by the same mechanisms as the floodwaters) may have shallowed out the topographic profile of the valley. As seen on Viking and MOC imagery, the streamlined forms of the Athabasca Valles often have up to ten distinct layers exposed by later catastrophic erosion, with each layer having a thickness of up to 10m. They are often paralleled by grooves that are up to 10m tall, fading out from the streamlined forms within a few hundreds of meters. These grooves are interpreted to be depositional, and are dimensionally consistent with similar features observed within the Channeled Scablands of Washington State.

In support of the megaflooding hypothesis, some authors have interpreted the platy and ridged terrains (described by others as characteristic lava textures) as relict sections of the underlying Medusae Fossae Formation that have been exhumed by aeolian processes.

Researchers who favor a megaflooding hypothesis generally favor one sourced from a deep-seated subsurface reservoir. Based on hydrological modeling, some authors have noted that there are no other water-based mechanisms, including gravitationally-controlled groundwater flow or the magmatic melting of ground ice, which could explain the volume of water required to carve the Athabasca Valles. Because there is no evidence of near-surface subsidence, this source reservoir is interpreted to be located deep underground.

However, the viability of this deep water-based model for the Athabasca Valles' formation has also been questioned from a hydrological modeling perspective, with various researchers noting that the region below Cerberus Fossae would require a fully saturated, exceedingly deep, and actively recharged reservoir of water preserved below an intact cryosphere – stored within aquifers with a greater porosity than those typically observed in terrestrial settings. However, some authors have argued that the implausibly high porosity requirement could be overlooked if extremely high pore pressures were supplied by tectonic activity associated with the concurrent formations of the Elysium and Tharsis Rises, likely through the effects of extensional faulting. If extensional stresses built up gradually in the vicinity of Cerberus Fossae, any tectonic activity would relieve this extensional stress, causing a relative compression that would pressurize the reservoir. Nearby diking, however, would add large amounts of material into the vicinity of the reservoir, compressing it and rapidly pressurizing it. Any rupturing and faulting associated with this tectonic activity would penetrate the overlying cryosphere (in a dry and cold Amazonian Mars); to compensate for its pressurization, reservoir fluids would be forced upwards through the fissure, forming the outflow channel morphologies observed on the surface. This interpretation has been disputed, with counterclaims that the diking or extensional fracturing that formed Cerberus Fossae would have had to uniformly breach the entirety the thick protective cryosphere in order to allow groundwater to escape in sufficient quantities to hydrodynamically satisfy the Athabasca Valles' megaflood formation scenario.

==== Low-viscosity lava flow formation hypothesis ====
Other authors have noted certain morphological features in the Athabasca Valles as inconsistent with the megaflooding hypothesis, based on very high resolution visual data collected using the HiRISE camera. At the mesoscale, the floor of the valley remains relatively uneroded compared to other Martian outflow channels and those of the Channeled Scablands. The valley floor is characterized by overlapping fronts that become progressively younger towards Cerberus Fossae, concentrically surrounding the fissure vent; this morphology has been interpreted as a series of successive lava flows erupting from the fossae downstream before debouching into the Cerberus Palus basin. These putative flows have ridged and polygonal textures that are consistent with a lava-based provenance, respectively suggestive of situations where lava began to bunch up, and where a solidified surface of lava collapsed as underlying molten rock continued to flow. In this interpretation, the streamlined island-like forms are interpreted to show a highstand (where the lava level reached a maximum height) prior to the drainage and pooling of molten material downstream into Cerberus Palus. Nearly the entire surface of the Athabasca Valles floor has been interpreted by some authors to morphologically parallel the Roza Member of the Wanapum Basalt, a unit within the Columbia River Basalt Group in the American Northwest; those researchers propose that the entire floor unit was deposited in a single eruptive event, with lavas in the area depositing turbulently as part of a flooding event.

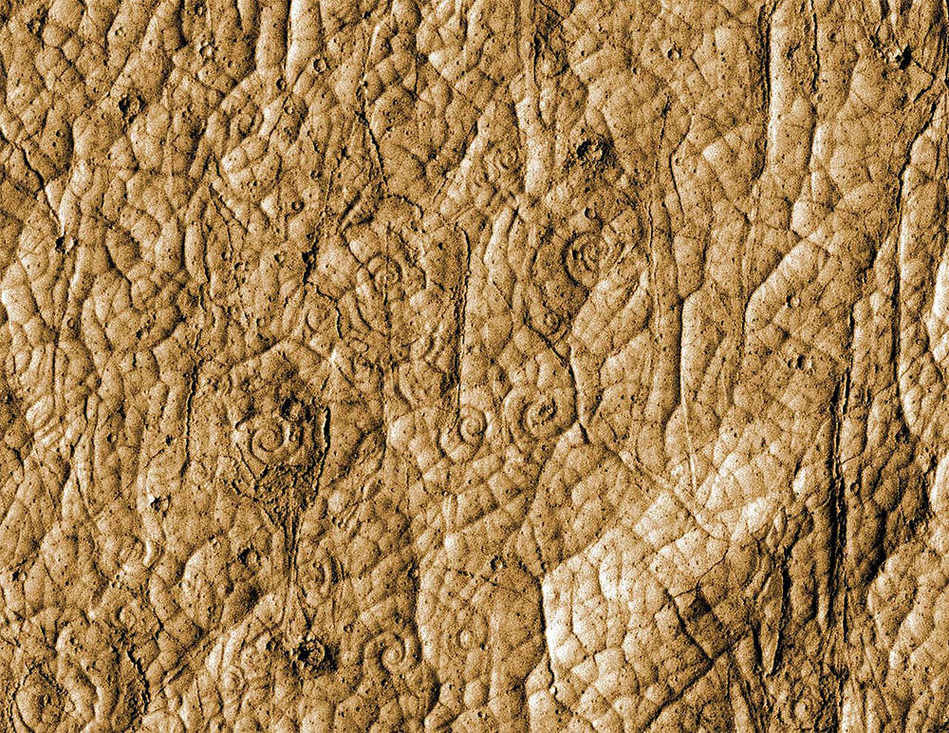
Lava flows downstream of the Athabasca Valles in Cerberus Palus in this HiRISE image. Putative lava coils are observed in this image and are on a scale of meters in diameter.

Some authors have noted a series of large, km-wide fractured plates that appear southwest of the debouchment of the Athabasca Valles into the Cerberus Palus plains region. Some authors have interpreted these features as analogous to lava rafts expelled downstream from the Athabasca Valles system during its formation. Such rafts have been observed in the pahoehoe lavas of Hawaii which have stagnated, forming a surface that hardens and then cracks. Gas escapes from lava around the peripheries of the resulting polygons, collapsing their edges and causing the centers of the polygons to bulge. Characteristic of such features are lava coils, in which two fluids of differing velocity and/or density flow past each other and cause a Kelvin-Helmholtz instability. Although ice rafts can manifest as plates of a similar size, shape, and distribution, there are no known glacial mechanisms that can create the coiled morphologies observed downstream of the Athabasca Valles.

Opponents of the lava flow hypothesis historically noted that the valley floor of the Athabasca Valles did not appear to morphologically resemble an uneroded lava surface (as seen on the medium-resolution camera Mars Orbiter Camera (MOC) and the low-resolution Mars Orbiter Laser Altimeter (MOLA)), and (along with all the channels of central Elysium Planitia) do not closely resemble any of the lava surfaces analogously located on Earth. In terrestrial settings, lava erosion is extremely rare and only occurs when it a hot lava is concentrated in a narrow area (such as an insulated lava tube) and is running down a steep slope. These conditions are inconsistent with the observed conditions in the Athabasca Valles and the other outflow channels in this region.

==== Englacial and supraglacial lava flow hypothesis ====
Some authors have proposed that a combination of mechanisms can satisfactorily explain the origin of the Athabasca Valles system – namely, the large-scale emplacement of low-viscosity lava flows on top of pre-existing glaciers. Apart from ice interactions, this large-scale low-viscosity volcanic efflux is thought to have formed up to a third of the modern Martian surface and has been analogized to Earth's large igneous provinces (LIPs). Individual periods of volcanic activity constituting the modern Elysium Planitia region are thought to have lasted up to 1 Myr, with the rock in the vicinity of the Athabasca Valles being potentially deposited on a timescale of weeks or months. Given the obliquity of Mars during this part of the Amazonian, it has been hypothesized that glaciers were likely actively accumulating in this region of Elysium Planitia at the same time as this period of volcanism.

Supporters of the megaflood hypothesis note that the streamlined forms seen in the Athabasca Valles are inconsistent with a glacial hypothesis. They are unlikely to be drumlins, which are streamlined and teardrop-shaped in all three dimensions. In the Athabasca Valles, many relict features (including crater rims) still appear on the top of streamlined forms. Because Martian gravity is weaker, Martian glaciers would have to be much thicker than their terrestrial counterparts in order to overcome frictional basal forces and begin flowing (with estimated thicknesses up to 4–5 km); such theoretical glaciers would have covered such landforms.

=== Geomorphological features of contentious interpretation ===
==== Ring-mound landforms ====
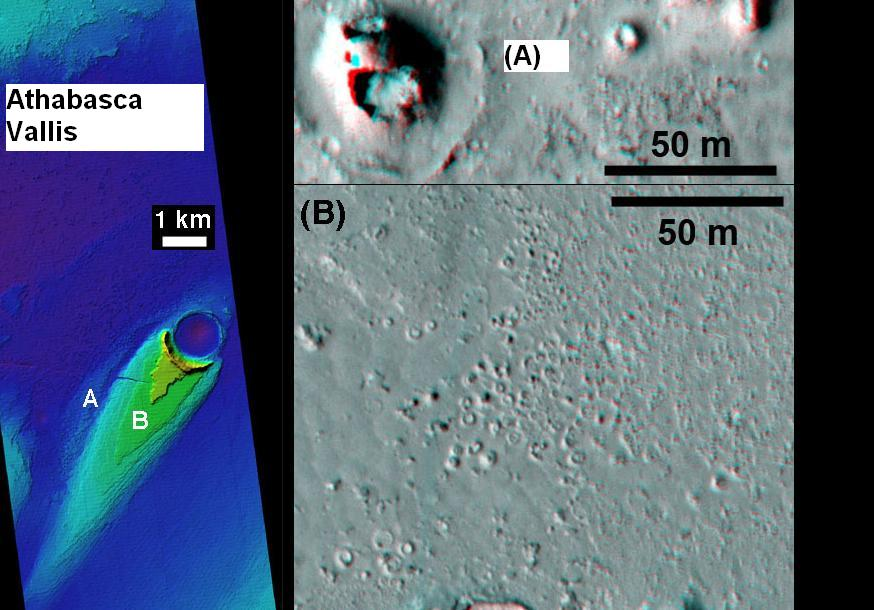
Cones in the Athabasca Valles as seen by HiRISE. Larger cones in upper image were produced when water/steam forced its way through thicker layer of lava. Difference between highest elevation (red) to lowest (dark blue) is 170 m (558 feet).

The floor of the Athabasca Valles is peppered with thousands of small cones and rings which exist only on the geomorphic unit on the floor of the valley. They are referred to by some authors as ring-mound landforms (RMLs). Because the distribution of these landforms are coterminous with this floor unit, they are thought to be indicative of the surface processes that formed the valley system. At least two different sets of these cones exist in the Athabasca Valles, in which some have wakes and others do not. Some researchers have proposed that the cones with wakes formed chronologically earlier than those without wakes. There are various interpretations that have been offered in the literature as to the formation of these features. These cones occur with single vents ("single cones"), with smaller cones within their vents ("double cones", which have only been observed to occur within the Athabasca Valles very near to the Cerberus Fossae fissure), and with multiple cones within a larger cone's vent (called by some researchers as "lotus fruit cones"). Occasionally, the RMLs are also encircled by radial trails of much smaller cone-like mounds. The "double" and "lotus fruit" RML morphologies are concentrated in flatter areas of the channel near Cerberus Fossae and are generally aligned parallel to the direction of the catastrophic flows that formed the valley.

The hypothesis that the Athabasca Valles were formed by a lava flow suggests that these RMLs are actually rootless cones, which form phreatomagmatically as steam is expelled through the solidifying lava flow. The RMLs strongly resemble rootless cones that have been analogously observed in Iceland in dimension and shape, and notably lack clear evidence of extrusive materials around the cones. Some proponents of the flood-formation hypothesis for the Athabasca Valles suggest that megaflood waters could have saturated the ground upon which lava could have later flowed, causing the phreatomagmatic effect, as they appear to have formed in depressions where water might have feasibly ponded. Because water ice was not stable in this region of Mars during the Amazonian, the lava flows that formed these rootless cones must have reached ponded areas very soon after the occurrence of a megaflood. Opponents of this hypothesis have noted that moat features surrounding many of the mounds are not typical of terrestrial rootless cones.

If the RMLs of the Athabasca Valles are pingoes, this strongly suggests that some combination of sediment and ice comprises the valley floor. The conical landforms observed within the valley system take three distinctive forms—circular mounds, mounds with large central peaks, and irregularly-shaped flat depressions. As seen on THEMIS data, these morphologies are consistent in size and shape with different stages of the pingo lifecycle observed on Earth in the Russian federal subject of Yakutia and the Tuktoyaktuk Peninsula in the Canadian Northwest Territories. Terrestrial pingoes are observed to form from the uplift of the basin of a draining thaw lake. Sudden exposure of the melting permafrost to freezing conditions triggers the uplift as the water content of the saturated ground expands (leading to the formation of the observed circular mounds). As this uplift continues, tensional cracks form near the top of the mound, exposing the ice core of the mound, which loses mass due either to melting or sublimation. Eventually, the core becomes unstable and collapses (forming the pitted mounds, referred to by some authors as "pingo scars"). If the pingo formed over a stable lens of groundwater, this collapse may cause that overpressured water source to erupt as a spring. This causes the total collapse of the pingo and the formation of a depression (the third mentioned irregularly shaped flatter morphologies). Many of the mounds of the Athabasca Valles are surrounded by moats, which is a feature of pingoes observed at the Tuktoyaktuk analogue. The densely-packed distribution and irregular, intermelding shapes of the mounds in this area are also common characteristics observed in terrestrial pingo fields.

Alternatively, some researchers also hypothesized that the RMLs of the Athabasca Valles were formed as volatiles violently degassed from the sediment flows upon which they were entrained, forming what are termed in the literature as "cryophreatic cones". The RMLs have been proposed by other authors to represent kettle hole lakes formed from deposited ice blocks. This interpretation is consistent with the hypothesis that the Athabasca Valles were formed by the erosive action of a mobile glacier.

== Observational history ==
=== Before 2000 ===
Modern Elysium Planitia (including the Athabasca Valles) and the Elysium Rise were first extensively mapped in the 1970s and 1980s using orbital imagery from the Viking program. Initial geophysical and tectonic interpretations of this region were proposed in the 1980s by various authors.

In 1990, Jeffrey B. Plescia of the Jet Propulsion Laboratory was among the first to examine the origin of central Elysium Planitia in detail; at the time of his publication, he referred to this region informally as the "Cerberus Plains", and was the first to critically examine the hypothesis that this region was largely formed through the eruption of low-viscosity flood lavas. This hypothesis – among other volcanic-aeolian and sedimentary hypotheses – ultimately received widespread acceptance in the Martian planetary geology community. Plescia observed the outflow channels of Elysium Planitia, noting the presence of streamlined islands, but highlighted the absence of regional-scale anastomosis in its channels, distinguishing them morphologically from those of the circum-Chryse region. He speculated that the streamlined islands were indicative of a relict bedrock floor that preceded the formation of the volcanic "Cerberus Plains", and that the characteristic anastomosing channels of the Chryse channels had been buried under flood lava flows.

David H. Scott and Mary G. Chapman of the United States Geological Survey published an examination of Elysium Planitia in 1991, including an updated geologic map of the region, proposing that Elysium Planitia was a basin that held a paleolake, interpreting the features in what they dubbed the "Elysium Basin" as sedimentary in origin.

In 1992, John K. Harmon, Michael P. Sulzer, Phillip J. Perillat (of the Arecibo Observatory in Puerto Rico) and John F. Chandler (of the Harvard-Smithsonian Center for Astrophysics near Boston, Massachusetts) reported the creation of large-scale radar reflectivity maps made of the Martian surface when Mars and Earth were in opposition in 1990. Strong depolarized echo signatures were found to coincide with terrains interpreted as volcanic in origin across the Martian surface. These signatures also spatially coincided very closely with the proposed volcanic flow unit reported by Jeffrey Plescia in 1990, including the floor of the Athabasca Valles, leading the researchers to lend support to Plescia's volcanic hypothesis.

At a 1998 NASA workshop at Ames Research Center near San Jose, California, James W. Rice and David H. Scott (of Ames and of the US Geological Survey, respectively) narrowed down 11 candidate landing sites for the now-canceled NASA Mars Surveyor mission. Elysium Planitia was one of the chosen sites, with the Athabasca Valles' putative hydrothermal origin a major motivation for proposing the Elysium landing site.

=== Early 2000s ===
==== 2002 ====
In 2002, Daniel C. Berman and William K. Hartmann at the Planetary Science Institute compared initial data from the Viking mission to more recent higher-resolution data from the Mars Global Surveyor, updating and challenging previous interpretations accordingly. They notably found crater age dates for Marte Vallis and the Athabasca Valles. The age estimates established for the floor of the Athabasca Valles suggested an upper age limit of 20 Ma, and a product of repeated flooding at many different times. The age of the valley floor was proposed to be up to several tens of Mya younger than the surrounding plains. Using new MGS data, the authors affirmed the initial Viking-era hypotheses that both water and lava features shaping the Athabasca Valles may have erupted at different times from the Cerberus Fossae fissures, although diagnostic morphological signs had since been overprinted by later geological events in the fossae. The study also explored potential sources of the water thought to have formed the Athabasca Valles, reasoning that an extremely deep reservoir of water with some protective layer was necessary to concentrate efflux of fluid matter through the narrow Cerberus Fossae system and to delay the outflow of water to such a late part of the Amazonian. Aquifer recharge by precipitation, long-distance water transport in the regolith from the highlands, local burial of glacial ice under volcanics, and atmospheric recharge via condensation were all suggested as possible but uncertain explanations.

A review was published concurrently by Devon Burr, Jennifer Grier, Alfred McEwen and Laszlo Keszthelyi (of the University of Arizona and Arizona State University), also using recently published MGS data (MOC and MOLA). The authors critically compared the morphologies observed in the Athabasca Valles system to those of Washington state's Channeled Scablands and provided extensive descriptions of geomorphological features within the valley system. The authors favored a primarily hydrological explanation for the Athabasca Valles and the other regional outflow channels, contesting contemporary hypotheses relating to lava and glacier flow due to the distinctly Channeled Scabland-like morphologies witnessed across all valleys.

Also in 2002, Devon M. Burr, Alfred S. McEwen (University of Arizona) and Susan E. H. Sakimoto (NASA's Goddard Space Flight Center in Maryland) reported on the presence of streamlined forms and longitudinal grooves downstream of Cerberus Fossae on the valley floor of the Athabasca Valles as morphologies justifying a megaflooding hypothesis for the valley's formation. The authors predicted that this floodwater likely infiltrated fresh lava flows downstream in Cerberus Palus, suggesting that extant ice deposits may remain buried there. The authors discussed these ice deposits as a means for NASA to possibly facilitate a future landed expedition on Mars.

==== 2003 ====
In 2003, Devon M. Burr of the University of Arizona published another report summing the results of a hydrological model of the Athabasca Valles intended to refresh older models of the outflow channel with new, higher-resolution MOLA topography data, and using a step-backwater model. Burr first noted that there were regions that were, according to her modeling, water might realistically pond around obstacles on the Athabasca Valles floor such as crater rims. She proposed that when later outbursts from Cerberus Fossae occurred, they would destroy these ponding deposits except in the eddy regions behind the obstacles. She proposed this as a new model by which streamlined forms likely formed in the valley system.

In 2003, Devon M. Burr published her doctoral dissertation, undertaken under her advisor Victor R. Baker at the University of Arizona, characterizing the outflow channels of Elysium Planitia, including the Athabasca Valles. This included assessment of terrains in central Elysium Planitia using MOC and MOLA data, and the design of a step-backwater model to hydrologically model outflow in the upstream reaches of the Athabasca Valles. Insights from her study manifested in three peer-reviewed publications, all of which addressed topics at least in part on the Athabasca Valles. In her research she clarified the chronological relationships between the formations of the Athabasca Valles, the Grjotá Valles, and Marte Vallis. She was not able to identify the precise mechanism by which floodwaters might catastrophically emerge from Cerberus Fossae but strongly favored floodwaters as the mechanism by which all three channels formed.

In 2003, Stephanie C. Werner and Gerhard Neukum of the Free University of Berlin and Stephan van Gasselt of the German Aerospace Center (DLR) re-affirmed the earlier crater-age dates asserted in 2001 by Berman and Hartmann using MGS data (MOC and MOLA). The researchers asserted that the valley is older than previously believed, noting the presence of flood deposits past the Athabasca Valles' debouchment dating back to as early as 1.6 Ga. The authors interpreted the valley system as having experienced geologic activity for a very long period of time, with volcanic activity (most recently up to 3 Ma) dominant towards the most recent history of the valley system. The authors favored the choice of the Athabasca Valles as a chosen landing site for the Mars Exploration Rover mission (better-known to the public as Spirit and Opportunity).

==== 2004 to 2005 ====
In 2004, Ross A. Beyer published his dissertation under the supervision of advisor Alfred McEwen at the University of Arizona. In his dissertation, among other topics, he invented a novel point photoclinometry method used to assess the surface roughness in the ellipses of candidate landing sites of NASA's Mars Exploration Rovers (Spirit and Opportunity). By using this method to characterize surface slopes, Beyer was able to ascertain how hazardous each given landing site was, providing information to those debating the viability of the sites at landing site workshops. The Athabasca Valles site was among those upon which Beyer applied his photoclinometry method.

In 2005, Jeffrey C. Hanna and Roger J. Phillips of Washington University in St. Louis studied the mechanisms by which the outflow channel systems of the Athabasca and Mangala valles might have formed, given their apparent origination from fissures (respectively, Cerberus Fossae and Memnonia Fossae). They hypothesized that tectonic overpressure could feasibly offset the implausibly high porosities necessary to explain the modeled floodwater volumes seen in both regions, and numerically modeled the stress fields and displacements at depth of each source fossae. Models were made in the case that diking was involved in the release of the pressurized reservoir floodwaters, or in the case of gradual extensional tectonic activity.

Also in 2005, Alfred McEwen and co-workers at the University of Arizona (in collaboration with others, including Matthew P. Golombek of the Jet Propulsion Laboratory, Devon Burr of the United States Geological Survey, and Philip Christensen of Arizona State University) reported their characterization of Zunil Crater – a large rayed crater in the neighborhood of the Athabasca Valles – and its associated secondary craters. The crater's rays were mapped using MOC and THEMIS data. The researchers noted that nearly 80% of the secondary craters mapped inside of the Athabasca Valles likely originated from Zunil. Having note that Zunil cross-cuts the extant floor of the Athabasca Valles, the authors placed the age of the system between 1.5 Ma and 200 Ma. This constraint was partially made based on the authors' assertion that Zunil is a strong candidate source for the shergottite meteorites, which are basalts of Martian origin that have been found and analyzed on Earth.

=== Late 2000s ===
In 2006, David P. Page and John B. Murray of the Open University contested the interpretation of pitted mounds in the distal region of the Athabasca Valles as rootless cones, offering an in-depth characterization of the pitted mound structures in the valley system when interpreted as pingoes. Page and Murray argued against the hypothesis that volcanism could have explained the formation of the Athabasca Valles system.

In 2007, Windy L. Jaeger, Lazlo P. Keszthelyi, Alfred McEwen, Patrick S. Russell and Colin S. Dundas (University of Arizona) examined very high resolution images from HiRISE and reassessed earlier interpretations of the Athabasca Valles system in light of the new available data. The researchers found that all the flood features in the Athabasca Valles are draped by lava flows, and concluded that the valley was most likely carved not by floodwaters but by low-viscosity lava erupting from Cerberus Fossae. They re-interpreted all putative glacial features observed both in the Athabasca Valles and downstream in Cerberus Palus as volcanic in nature, directly challenging the periglacial hypothesis claimed by David Page and co-workers. David Page directly disputed the authors' volcanic interpretations of the pitted mounds and polygonal terrains in a later publication, noting that these features occasionally are found to superpose impact craters. A volcanic interpretation does not permit this later resurfacing. Page criticized the researchers for cherry-picking observations to suit their hypothesis. The authors responded to Page's criticisms by pointing out that secondary impact craters are not always energetic enough to completely erase pre-existing landforms, and that his assertions about polygonal terrain are analogized from a region of Elysium Planitia that is very far and that is structurally distinct from the polygons observed within the Athabasca Valles. Jaeger and her co-workers also noted GRS, SHARAD and CRISM interpretations strongly suggesting that water ice has not been a major reshaping force in the geologic history of the Athabasca Valles.

In 2009, David P. Page, Matthew R. Balme, and Monica M. Grady (of The Open University) reinterpreted a widespread polygonal plains texturation spanning much of Elysium Planitia and Amazonis Planitia as not of a volcanic origin coincident with the plains' formation, but as a progressive resurfacing associated with glacial processes analogized to features witnessed across Earth dating to the Last Glacial Maximum. This polygonal terrain is observed to overprint virtually all impact craters in this region, and are believed (according to comparative crater counts) to have obliterated many pre-existing craters. If the plains of Elysium Planitia are being actively resurfaced, this casts earlier crater count-based age estimates into doubt across the entire region, with particular counts from the Athabasca Valles valley floor (comparing polygonized terrains to non-polygonized terrains) possibly misdated as nearly 40 times younger than they were initially estimated to be. The authors further argue that the progression of polygonal terrains to thermokarst terrains to pingo morphologies suggests (in analogy to terrestrial circumstances) an increasingly temperate climate into the late Amazonian.

In 2009, Joyce Vetterlein and Gerald P. Roberts of the University of London in England reported on the presence of extensional faulting off southern Cerberus Fossae, cross-cutting morphologies attributed to both the outflow channel and to subsequent lava cover. The authors noted that these faults are likely the most recent geologic feature in the Cerberus Fossae and Athabasca Valles region. MOLA altimetric data was used to establish fault offset and graben throw, with HiRISE and THEMIS used to provide context. This subsidence was decisively attributed to faulting and not to a local collapse in the cryosphere; the authors noted, then, that the topography of the Cerberus Fossae alone cannot be used to infer the volume of the fluid that carved the Athabasca Valles.

=== 2010s ===
Researchers from the United States Geologic Survey (including Windy Jaeger, Lazlo Keszthelyi, and James A. Skinner) and Alfred McEwen (University of Arizona) published a study in 2010 using high-resolution HiRISE and CTX data to map flood lavas in the Athabasca Valles region. The extent of this flood lava unit was found to be approximately the size of the American state of Oregon in extent. CRISM spectral data was used to confirm the composition of the geomorphic units mapped in the course of this effort, and reaffirmed earlier large-scale assertions using GRS spectral data that the Athabasca Valles floor is largely ultramafic and mafic in composition. This work refocused the initial 2007 finding by the researchers that a veneer of lava covered the entirety of the Athabasca Valley floor, proposing that this lava layer was deposited turbulently in a single eruption over a span of weeks. This would be the first instance of a turbulently-deposited flood lava to have been documented anywhere in the Solar System. Four 1:500K geomorphic maps of the Athabasca Valles were to be produced using CTX and HiRISE data, but funding ran short and the insights from the mapping effort were incorporated into the 2010 Jaeger et al study instead. A single 1:1M resolution map was later funded to bring this quadrangle to completion, with an abstract published for the Planetary Geologic Mappers' Meeting in Flagstaff, Arizona in 2018.

In 2012, Andrew J. Ryan and Phil Christensen (of Arizona State University) observed the presence of lava coil-like structures on fractured plates immediately downstream of the Athabasca Valles. These features strongly resemble those of Hawaii's pahoehoe flows, leading credence to the low-viscosity lava hypothesis for the formation of the outflow channel.

In 2015, Rina Noguchi and Kei Kurita of the University of Tokyo attempted to reconcile the ongoing disagreements over the origin of the ring-mound landforms by evaluating the spatial distributions and unique morphologies of the different types of RMLs present in the valley. The researchers separated out the features based on number and arrangement of the cones' vents – single cones, concentric double cones, and "lotus fruit cones" which have more than two cones within the moat). The double cones and lotus fruit cones described by the authors were analogized to the rootless cones of Mývatn in northern Iceland, noting that they lacked the slopes and tensile summit cracks characteristic of terrestrial pingoes.

In 2018, James Cassanelli (a graduate student of James W. Head, both of Brown University) proposed that large regional-scale interactions between glaciers in central Elysium Planitia and the active formation of the lava flows constituting the plains were responsible for the geomorphologies observed in the Athabasca Valles and the other central Elysian outflow channels.

Also in 2018, a collaboration of Italian, German and French researchers including Barbara de Toffoli developed and validated a fractal analysis tool designed to correspond Martian mound-like structures to associated regional fracture zones in order to predict the extent of their source reservoirs. Among the features chosen for analysis, the researchers examined putative pingoes in the Athabasca Valles on HiRISE data, which were compared to terrestrial analogues in the Russian Kolyma Lowland region.
