= Mount Martin (Alaska) =

Stratovolcano in the state of Alaska

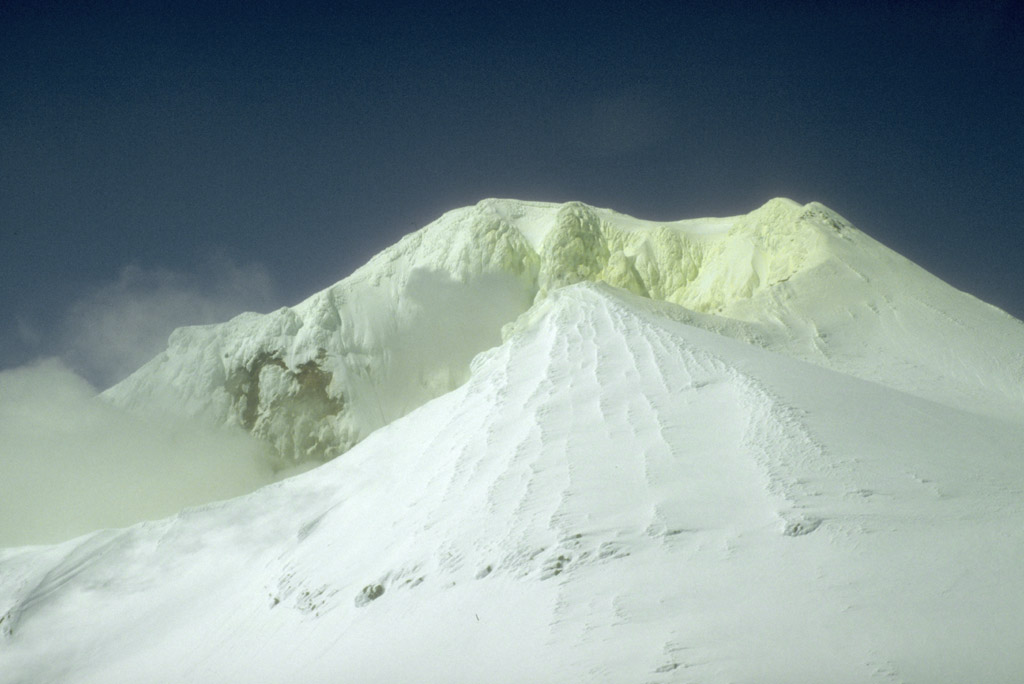
- Summit crater of Mount Martin volcano, June 1990

Highest point
- Elevation: 6,112 ft (1,863 m)
- Prominence: 1,377 ft (420 m)
- Coordinates: 58°10′09″N 155°21′24″W

Geography
- Location within Alaska
- Location: Katmai National Park and Preserve, Alaska, USA
- Parent range: Aleutian Range
- Topo map: USGS Mount Katmai A-5

Geology
- Formed by: Subduction zone volcanism
- Rock age: Holocene
- Mountain type: Stratovolcano
- Volcanic arc: Aleutian Arc
- Last eruption: Unknown

Mount Martin is a stratovolcano, located on the Alaska Peninsula, United States, in Katmai National Park and Preserve. It is one of the volcanoes in the vicinity of the Valley of Ten Thousand Smokes. Mount Martin's cone stands only about 500 metres (1,600 ft) higher than the surrounding ridge. Although an eruption in 1953 is now considered questionable and no other confirmed eruptive activity has taken place at Mount Martin, there is intense fumarolic activity within its summit crater. The summit crater is also breached to the southeast. The 300 m (984 ft)-wide summit crater is often ice-free due to the geothermal heat and contains an intermittent acidic crater lake. The fumaroles in the summit crater produce extensive sulfur deposits.

Mount Martin is relatively young, perched on a ridge and partly overlaying deposits from nearby Alagogshak volcanic edifice.

The volcano is named for George C. Martin, who was the first person to visit the Valley of Ten Thousand Smokes after the 1912 eruption of Novarupta.

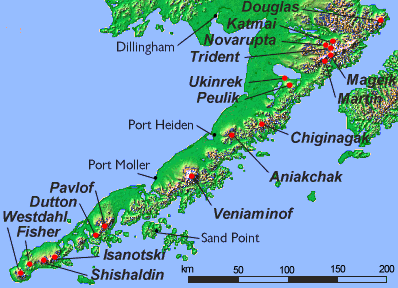
Map showing volcanoes of Alaska Peninsula.

== See also ==
- List of volcanoes in the United States of America
