= River Lethe =

River in Alaska

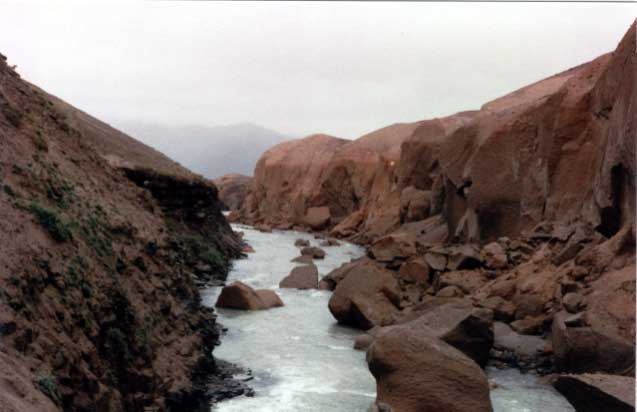
Canyon cut in ash by River Lethe

The River Lethe is located 18 km (12 mi) west of Mount Katmai, Alaska Peninsula, and is the middle branch of the Ukak River. It flows through the Valley of Ten Thousand Smokes and meets the Ukak at 58°23′44″N 155°24′00″W.

The river was named in 1917 by R. F. Griggs, National Geographic Society; inspired by Lethe, the "river of forgetfulness" in the Hades of Greek mythology.

A dry channel on Mars (which could carry water or lava) is named Lethe Vallis after this river.

== See also ==
- List of Alaska rivers
