= Alagogshak =

Volcano on the Alaska Peninsula, U.S.

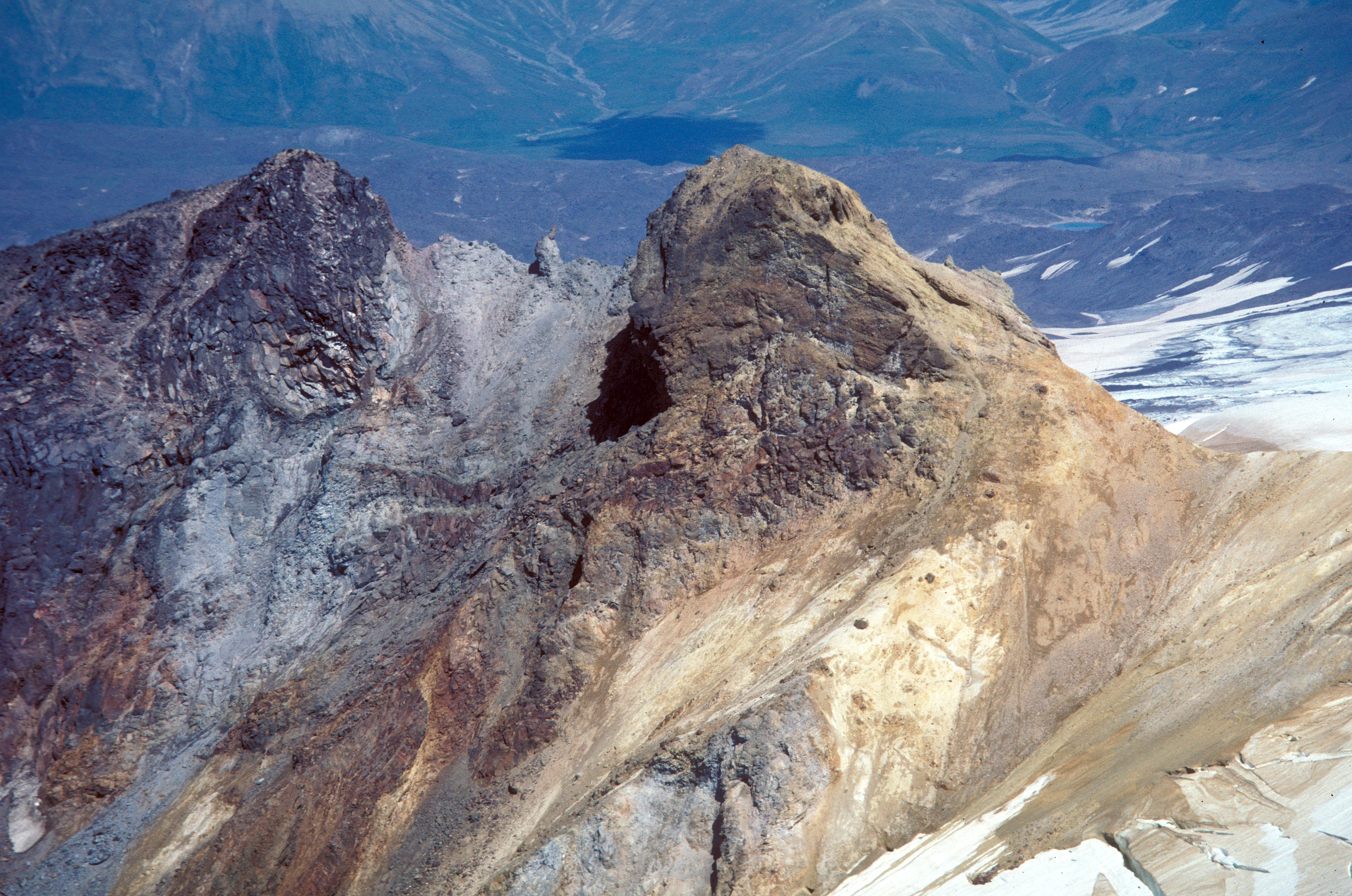
- Alagogshak summit in 1997

Highest point
- Elevation: 5,495 ft (1,675 m)
- Prominence: 377 ft (115 m)
- Coordinates: 58°09′26″N 155°23′54″W

Geography
- Location within Alaska
- Location: Katmai National Park and Preserve, Alaska, USA
- Parent range: Aleutian Range
- Topo map: USGS Mount Katmai A-5

Geology
- Rock age: Pleistocene
- Mountain type: Stratovolcano
- Volcanic arc: Aleutian Arc
- Last eruption: Unknown

Alagogshak is a stratovolcano, located on the Alaska Peninsula, United States, in Katmai National Park and Preserve. It is the oldest of the volcanoes in the vicinity of the Valley of Ten Thousand Smokes. The volcano was recognized as a separate feature from Mount Martin in 1997. The Holocene Mount Martin stands partly on Alagogshak's deeply eroded edifice, about 3 kilometres (1.9 mi) northeast of the Alagogshak vent. Alagogshak was last active in Pleistocene time, and was active from about 680,000 years ago to about 43,000 years ago. The remnant summit crater consists of hydrothermally altered rock. It is the only member of the Katmai volcanic group that is no longer active.

The name Alagogshak is an informal name given by the geological team that investigated the volcano, from nearby Alagogshak Creek, whose name comes from native Alaskan tradition.

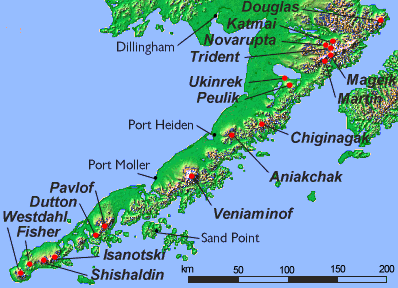
Map showing volcanoes of Alaska Peninsula

== See also ==
- List of volcanoes in the United States of America
