= Robert Fiske Griggs =

American botanist (1881–1962)

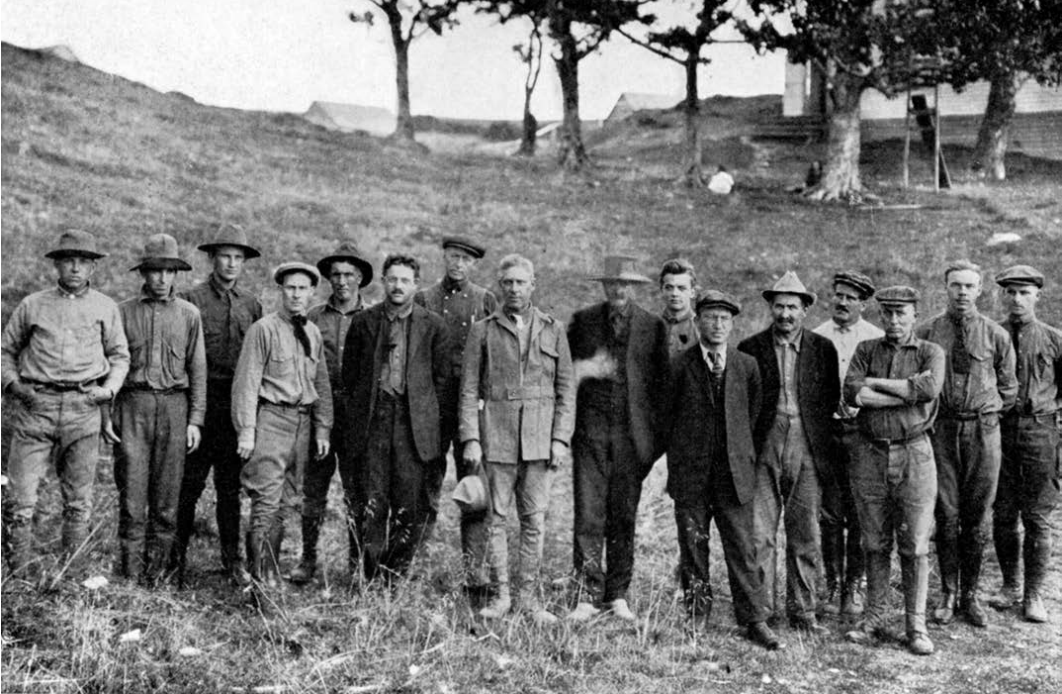
1919 Katmai expedition with Griggs sixth from the left

Robert Fiske Griggs (August 22, 1881, in Brooklyn, Connecticut – June 10, 1962), was a botanist who led a 1915 National Geographic Society (NGS) expedition to observe the aftermath of the Katmai volcanic eruption.

== National Geographic expeditions ==
In June 1917, Griggs and the eager NGS explorers rushed to the Katmai coast with the express goal of exploring the Valley of Ten Thousand Smokes. They quickly worked their way up through the ash-filled Katmai River valley and over the pass. It was a month of terror and elation for the twelve adventurers. Through the long Alaska summer days, they took chemical and geologic samples, shot photographs, and made rough maps. Mincing their way across the crumbling, treacherous surface of the hot ash, they studied the temperatures and temperaments of the roaring fumaroles and explored the perilous margins of the pyroclastic deposits. As they explored and documented the valley, they began to build a picture of the eruption. For five years, the American public had been entranced by the exciting volcanic discoveries in Alaska. Hungry for stories to push the horrors of World War I from their minds, thousands of National Geographic subscribers were thrilled to read Griggs' gripping articles about the adventures of his exploring parties.

As the discoveries unfolded, Griggs became increasingly zealous in his advocacy of the site. His vivid descriptions of the wonders of the Katmai country ignited the interest of what was then a budding conservation movement in the United States. The mysterious volcanic valley seemed an ideal candidate for protection. Griggs and the chiefs of the National Geographic Society campaigned persistently to preserve the area. In 1918, President Woodrow Wilson declared 1,700 square miles (4,400 km^{2}) of land as Katmai National Monument.

== Academia ==
He held degrees from Ohio State University (BA), University of Minnesota (MA), and Harvard University (Ph.D.). He taught at Fargo College, Ohio State, George Washington University, and University of Pittsburgh.

== Legacy ==
Griggs' son, David Griggs, was a geophysicist who worked with the United States Air Force. He testified in support of the suspension of J. Robert Oppenheimer's security clearance.

In 1919, botanists Frank Lincoln Stevens and Nora Elizabeth Dalbey published Griggsia, which is a genus of fungi in the class Dothideomycetes. It was named in Griggs' honor.

Knife Peak Volcano, located within the Katmai National Monument, was renamed Mount Griggs in 1956 due to Griggs' efforts in the region.
