= Lethe Vallis =

Valley in Mars

- Lethe Vallis, as seen by HiRISE. Flow was from southwest to northeast. Wider part of Lethe Vallis had less erosive power, so mesas are left behind from pre-existing material. Scale bar is 500 meters long.
- Coordinates: 4°N 206.5°W

Lethe Vallis is a valley in the Elysium Planitia on Mars, located at 4° North and 206.5° West. It is 225 km long and is named after river Lethe in Katmai National Monument, Alaska, USA. Lethe Vallis originates at the SE margin of the West Elysium Basin (Cerberus Palus). West Elysium Basin probably contained a lake that was 500 km across and received water from Athabasca Vallis. It was probably formed in just days or weeks and had a discharge about like the Mississippi. Some have suggested it was formed from lava flows, but lava would not be able to flow over such a low gradient for so long a distance.
