= Griggsia =

Scientific classification
- Kingdom: Fungi
- Division: Ascomycota
- Class: Dothideomycetes
- Subclass: incertae sedis
- Genus: Griggsia; F.Stevens & Dalbey (1919)

Type species
- Griggsia cyathea F.Stevens & Dalbey (1919)

Genus of fungi

Griggsia is a genus of fungi in the class Dothideomycetes. The relationship of this taxon to other taxa within the class is unknown (incertae sedis). Also, the placement of this genus within the Dothideomycetes is uncertain. The genus name of Griggsia is in honour of American botanist Robert Fiske Griggs (1881–1962).

The genus was circumscribed by Frank Lincoln Stevens and Nora Elizabeth Dalbey in Bot. Gaz. vol.68 on page 224 in 1919.

A monotypic genus, it contains the single species Griggsia cyathea.

== See also ==
- List of Dothideomycetes genera incertae sedis
