= Cynthia B. Phillips =

American planetary geologist

Cynthia B. Phillips (born 1973) is an American planetary geologist who works for NASA at the Jet Propulsion Laboratory. A focus of her research has been Europa, one of the moons of Jupiter, and she is project staff scientist and project science communications lead for the Europa Clipper spacecraft mission. An expert on processing images from space missions to the planets and their moons, and on the geological processes operating within moons, she has studied the effects of asteroid impacts on the surface of Europa, and definitions of non-earth-based life that could apply on places like Europa that are outside the circumstellar habitable zone.

== Education and career ==
Phillips went to Concord-Carlisle High School in Concord, Massachusetts, where she grew up. She was an undergraduate at Harvard University, where she studied astronomy, astrophysics, and physics, graduating magna cum laude with an A.B. in 1995. She completed a Ph.D. in planetary science at the University of Arizona in 2000. Her dissertation, Voyager and Galileo SSI Views of Volcanic Resurfacing on Io and the Search for Geologic Activity on Europa, was supervised by Alfred McEwen.

She worked as a researcher at the SETI Institute for 15 years before joining the Jet Propulsion Laboratory to work on the Europa Clipper mission.

== Books ==
As well as her research publications, Phillips is a coauthor with Shana Priwer of science popularization books including:

- 101 Things You Didn't Know About Da Vinci: Inventions, Intrigue, and Unpublished Works
- 101 Things You Didn't Know About Einstein: Sex, Science, and the Secrets of the Universe
- The Everything Astronomy Book: Discover the Mysteries of the Universe
- The Everything Da Vinci Book: Explore the Life and Times of the Ultimate Renaissance Man
- The Everything Einstein Book: From Matter and Energy to Space and Time, All You Need to Understand the Man and His Theories
- Essential Astronomy: Everything You Need to Understand the Mysteries of Our Universe
- Space Exploration for Dummies,
- Bridges and Spans
- Dams and Waterways
- Skyscrapers and High Rises
- Ancient Monuments
- Modern Wonders
