= Gamma Ray Spectrometer (2001 Mars Odyssey) =

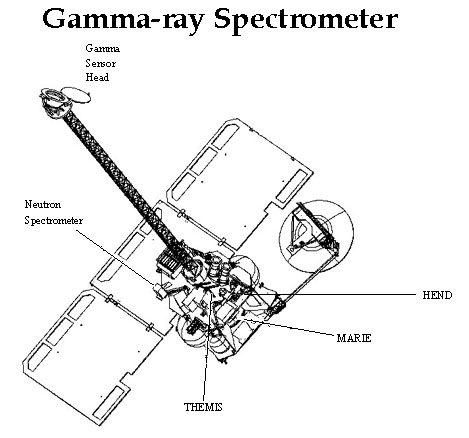
A diagram of the scientific instruments present on 2001 Mars Odyssey; the Gamma Ray Spectrometer consists of the Gamma Sensor Head, the Neutron Spectrometer and HEND (High Energy Neutron Detector).

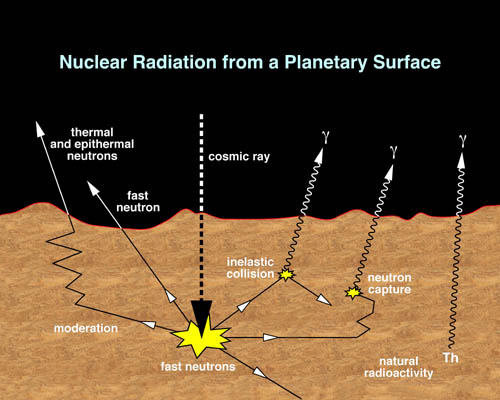
How GRS collects data from surface

The Gamma Ray Spectrometer (GRS) is a gamma-ray spectrometer on the 2001 Mars Odyssey spacecraft, a space probe orbiting the planet Mars since 2001. Part of NASA's Mars Surveyor 2001 program, it returns geological data about Mars's surface such as identifying elements and the location of water. It is maintained by the Lunar and Planetary Laboratory at the University of Arizona in the United States. This instrument has mapped the distribution surface hydrogen, thought to trace water in the surface layer of Martian soil.

== GRS specifications ==
The Gamma Ray Spectrometer weighs 30.5 kilograms (67 lb) and uses 32 watts of power. Along with its cooler, it measures 468 by 534 by 604 millimetres (18.4 by 21.0 by 23.8 in). The detector is a photodiode made of a 1.2-kilogram (2.6 lb) germanium crystal, reverse biased to about 3 kilovolts, mounted at the end of a 6-metre (20 ft) boom to minimize interferences from the gamma radiation produced by the spacecraft itself. Its spatial resolution is about 300 kilometres (190 mi).

The neutron spectrometer is 173 by 144 by 314 millimetres (6.8 by 5.7 by 12.4 in).

The high-energy neutron detector measures 303 by 248 by 242 millimetres (11.9 by 9.8 by 9.5 in). The instrument's central electronics box is 281 by 243 by 234 millimetres (11.1 by 9.6 by 9.2 in).
