= Alfred McEwen =

American planetary geologist

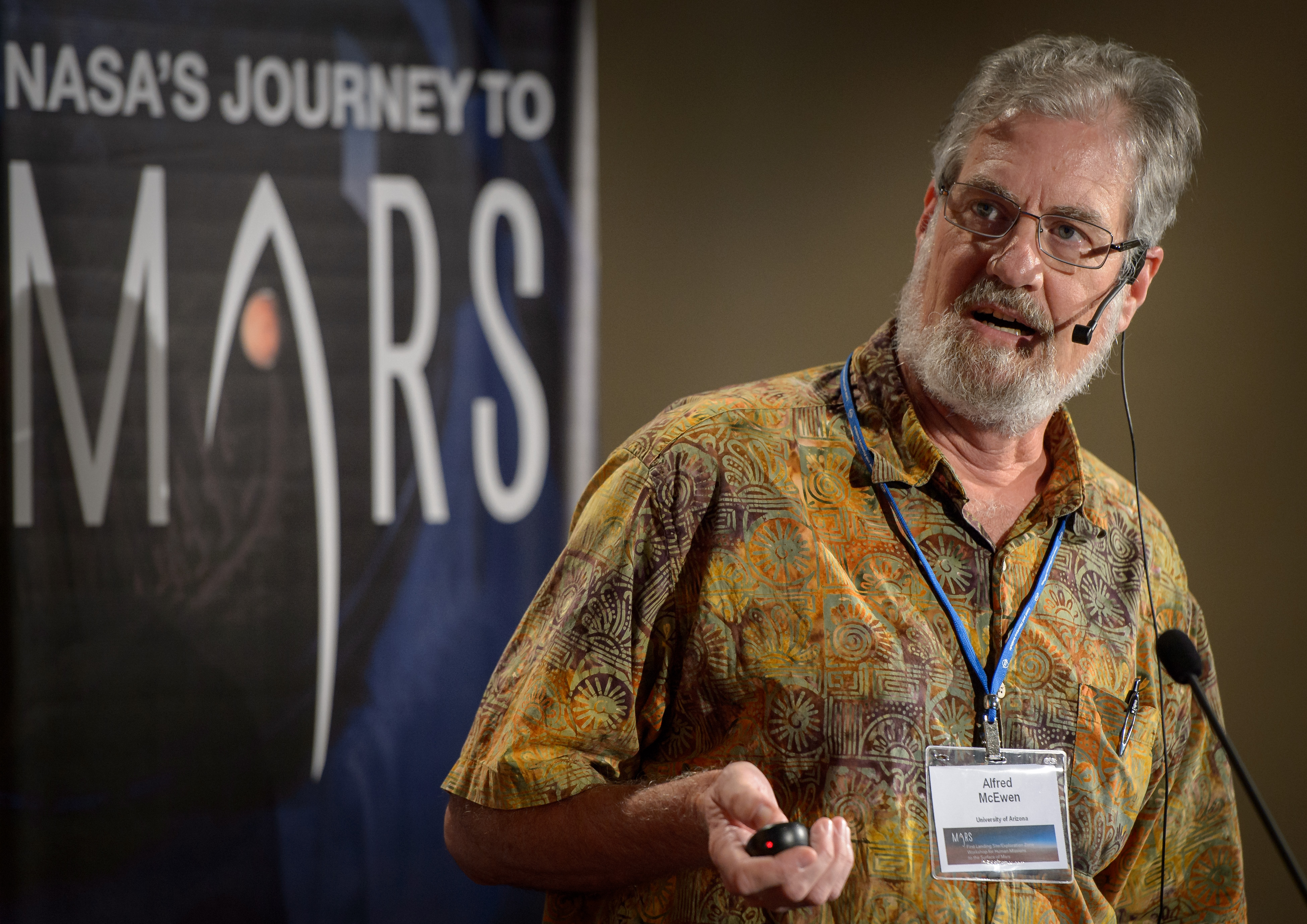
- McEwen speaks during the First Landing Site/Exploration Zone Workshop for Human Missions to the Surface of Mars, 2015
- Education: Arizona State University
- Known for: HiRISE
- Awards: Whipple Award, G. K. Gilbert Award
- Scientific career
- Fields: Planetary Geology
- Workplaces: Lunar and Planetary Laboratory
- Doctoral students: JA Grier; Cynthia B. Phillips
- Website: www.lpl.arizona.edu/faculty/mcewen

Alfred McEwen is an American professor of planetary geology at the University of Arizona. McEwen is a member of the Lunar and Planetary Laboratory where he is the director of the Planetary Image Research Laboratory. He was a member of the imaging science team on the Cassini–Huygens mission to Saturn, co-investigator on the Lunar Reconnaissance Orbit Camera team, and principal investigator of the High Resolution Imaging Science Experiment (HiRISE) aboard the Mars Reconnaissance Orbiter.

He earned a Ph.D. in Planetary Geology in 1988 from Arizona State University.

McEwen participated in the Mars Odyssey, Mars Global Surveyor, and Galileo spacecraft missions.

In 2015, McEwen received the Whipple Award for his work on HiRISE. In 2019, he received the G. K. Gilbert Award.

== Bibliography ==
- McEwen, Alfred S. (May 2013). "Mars in motion". Planetary Science. Scientific American. 308 (5): 44–51. Bibcode:2013SciAm.308e..58M. doi:10.1038/scientificamerican0513-58. PMID 23627221.
