= Cerberus Palus =

Palus on Mars

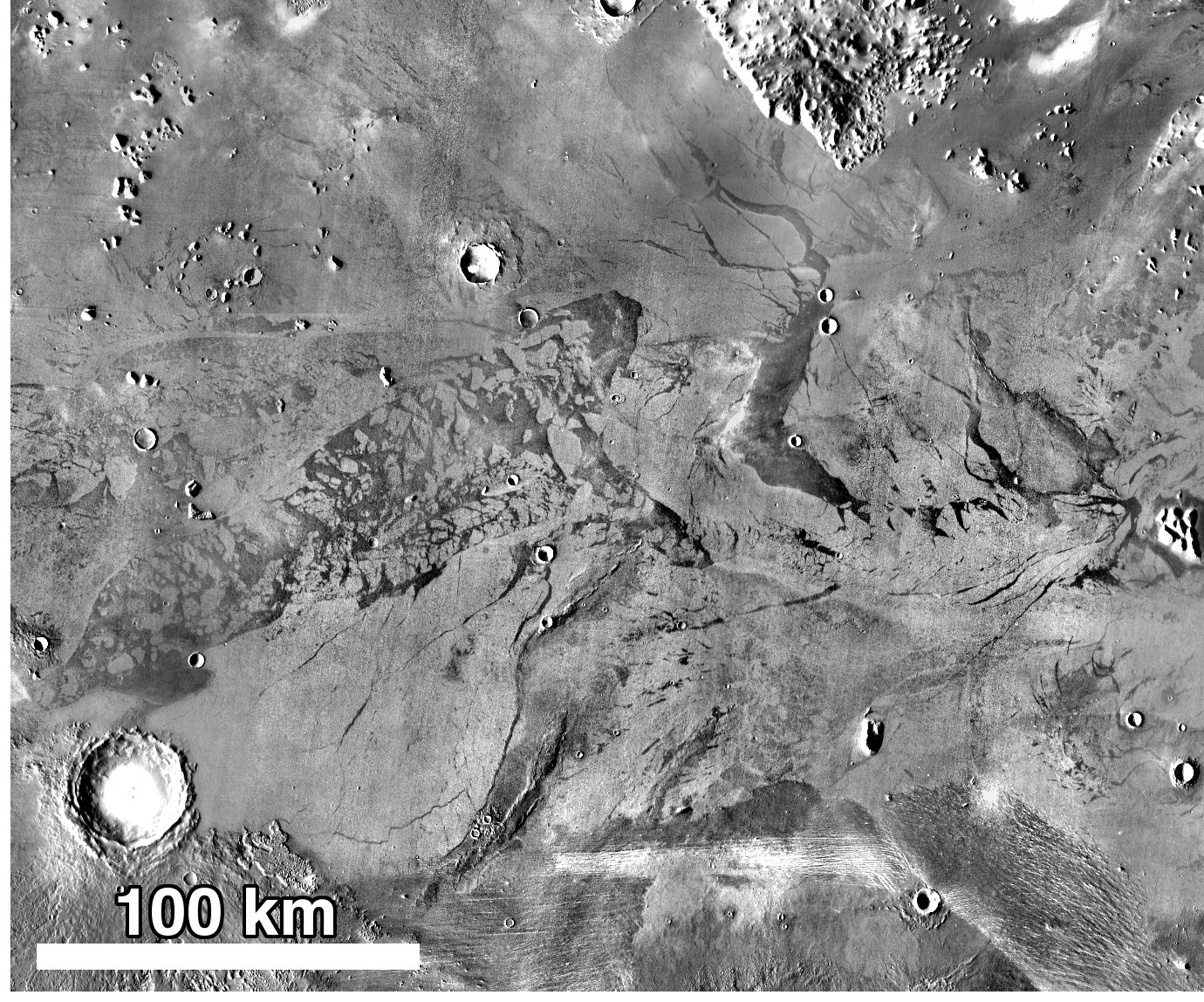
- Cerberus Palus, as seen by THEMIS.
- Coordinates: 5.5°N 150.5°E

Cerberus Palus is a plain in the Elysium quadrangle of Mars, centered at 5.8°N 148.1°E. It is 470 km across and was named after a classical albedo feature Cerberus.

Cerberus Palus once contained a lake fed by Athabasca Valles and draining into Lethe Vallis. According to different researches, it could be a lake of water or lava. It is notable by giant plates (up to 50 km and more), similar to pack ice, but possibly pieces of lava crust. Gaps between the plates contain spiral-shaped geological features, probably lava coils.

== Links ==
- Map of the region
