= JA Grier =

American planetary scientist (born 1968)

JA Grier (born 1968) is an American planetary scientist who works as a senior scientist and senior education and communication specialist at the Planetary Science Institute. Grier's research has focused on the weathering of planets, moons, and asteroids, the age of impact ejecta on the lunar soil, the chemical composition of meteorites, and the existence of water on Mars. They are also active in science education.

== Education and career ==
Grier completed a PhD in 1999 from the University of Arizona with a dissertation Determining the ages of impact events: Multidisciplinary studies using remote sensing and sample analysis techniques supervised by Alfred McEwen. They started working for the Planetary Science Institute in 1999.

== Publications ==
Grier is a coauthor of books including:

- Guide to the Universe: Inner Planets (with Andrew S. Rivkin, Greenwood Publishing, 2010)
- Airless Bodies of the Inner Solar System: Understanding the Process Affecting Rocky, Airless Surfaces (with Andrew S. Rivkin, Elsevier, 2019)

== Recognition ==
Grier was named a Fellow of the American Astronomical Society in 2024, "for over two decades of commitment to advancing accessibility, inclusion, and diversity within the scientific community; and for important advances in planetary sciences, particularly in the area of lunar optical maturity effects".

Minor planet 7807 Grier is named for Grier.

== Personal life ==
Grier identifies as "queer/trans/non-binary". They have published numerous poems, essays, and short works of speculative fiction, including some under the pseudonym Bryce Ellicott.
