= Lava coil =

A lava coil is a spiral or scroll-shaped lava formation occurring when relatively low viscosity lava such as Pahoehoe solidifies along a slow-moving shear zone in the flow. The shear produces a Kelvin–Helmholtz instability that forms spiral-shaped patterns. Depending on the side of the flow the spiral is clockwise or anti-clockwise. They have been observed on flows near Kilauea on Hawai'i, in Kenya and possibly on Mars.

Lava Coils on Earth and Mars

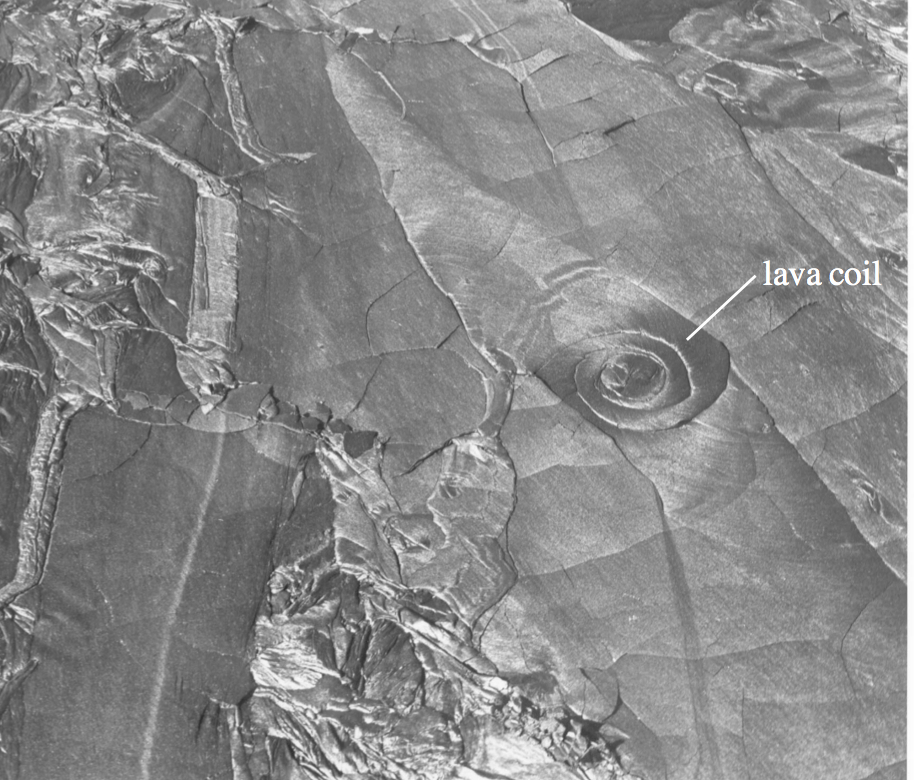
Surface of December 31, 1974 pahoehoe northeast of Pu‘u Koa ́e, Hawaii. Lava coil is 10 m diameter.

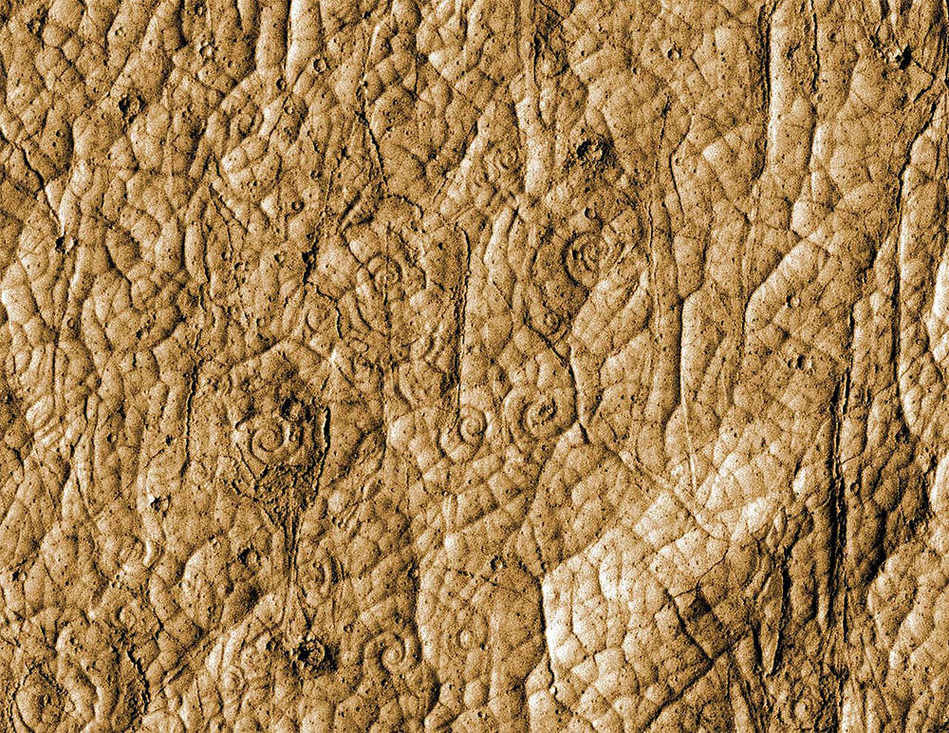
Spirals interpreted to be lava coils on the surface of a Martian lava lake in Cerberus Palus. Field of view is about 500 m.
