= Mount Katmai =

Stratovolcano in Katmai National Park, Alaska, US

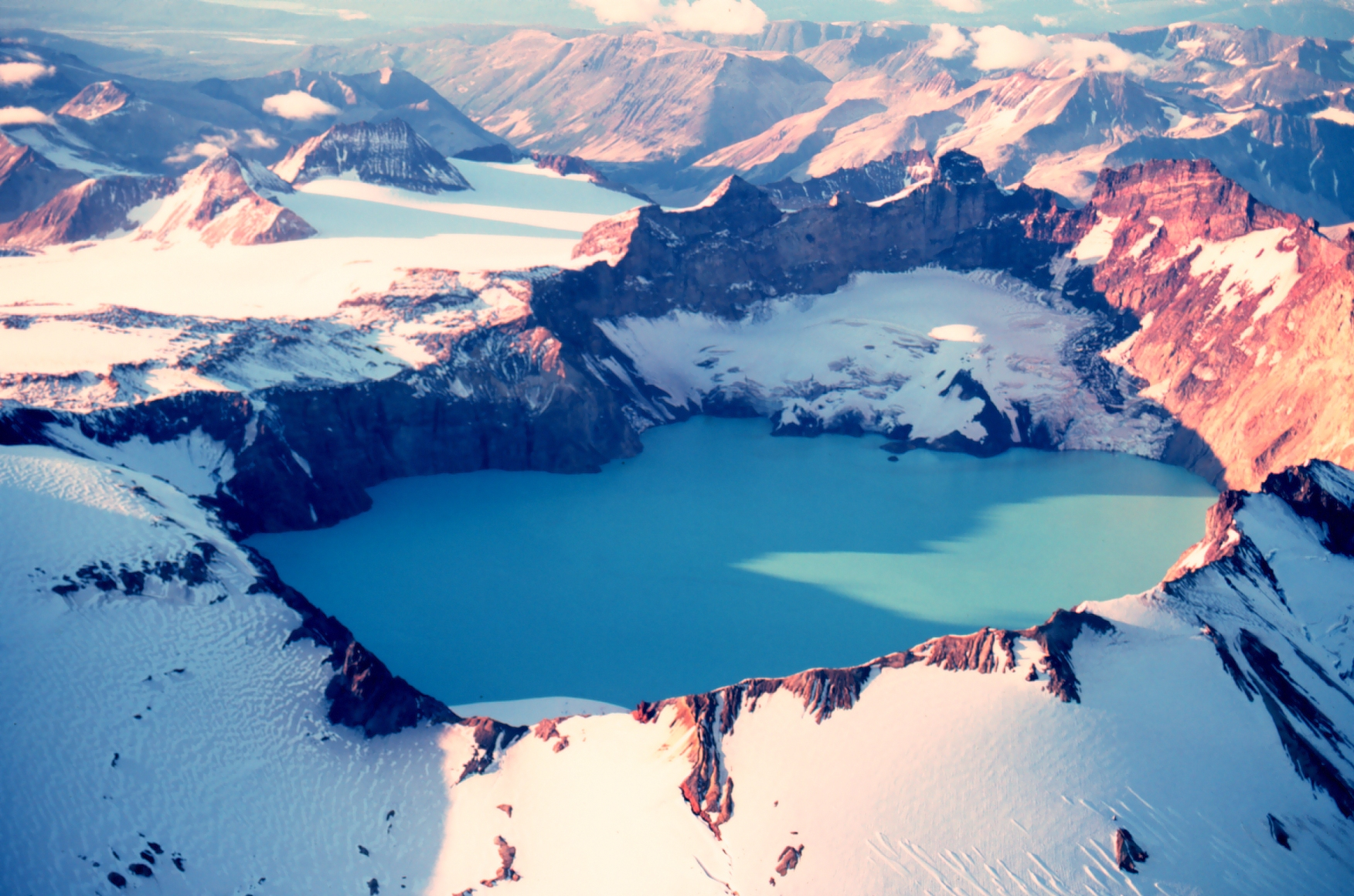
- Mount Katmai and its crater lake in September 1980

Highest point
- Elevation: 6,715 ft (2,047 m)
- Prominence: 2,391 ft (729 m)
- Coordinates: 58°16′43.0″N 154°57′24.9″W

Geography
- Location within Alaska
- Country: United States
- State: Alaska
- Protected area: Katmai National Park and Preserve
- Parent range: Aleutian Range
- Topo map: USGS Mount Katmai B-3

Geology
- Formed by: Subduction zone volcanism
- Mountain type: Stratovolcano
- Volcanic arc: Aleutian Arc
- Last eruption: June 6-9, 1912

Climbing
- Easiest route: Basic snow/ice climb

Mount Katmai (Russian: Катмай) is a large dormant stratovolcano (composite volcano) on the Alaska Peninsula in southern Alaska, located within Katmai National Park and Preserve. It is about 6.3 miles (10 km) in diameter with a central lake-filled caldera about two by three miles (3.2 by 4.8 km) in size, formed during the Novarupta eruption of 1912. The caldera rim reaches a maximum elevation of 6,715 feet (2,047 m). In 1975 the surface of the crater lake was at an elevation of about 4,055 feet (1,236 m), and the estimated elevation of the caldera floor is about 3,260 ft (995 m).

The mountain is located in Kodiak Island Borough, very close to its border with Lake and Peninsula Borough. The volcano has caused ten known fatalities due to gas exposure.

Since the 1912 eruption, the Alaska Volcano Observatory routinely issues advisories for ash. Strong winds during the summer when snow cover is sparse can lift ash from the 1912 eruption high into the air (20,000 feet plus in some cases). This can cause a serious hazard for any aircraft that might fly through the ash plume. No volcanic eruption is associated with this phenomenon.

== Geology ==
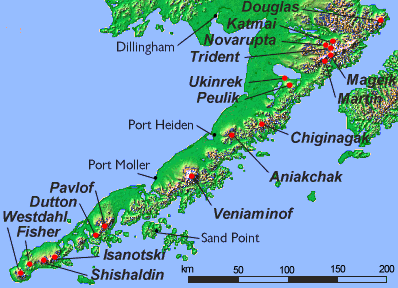
Map showing volcanoes of Alaska Peninsula

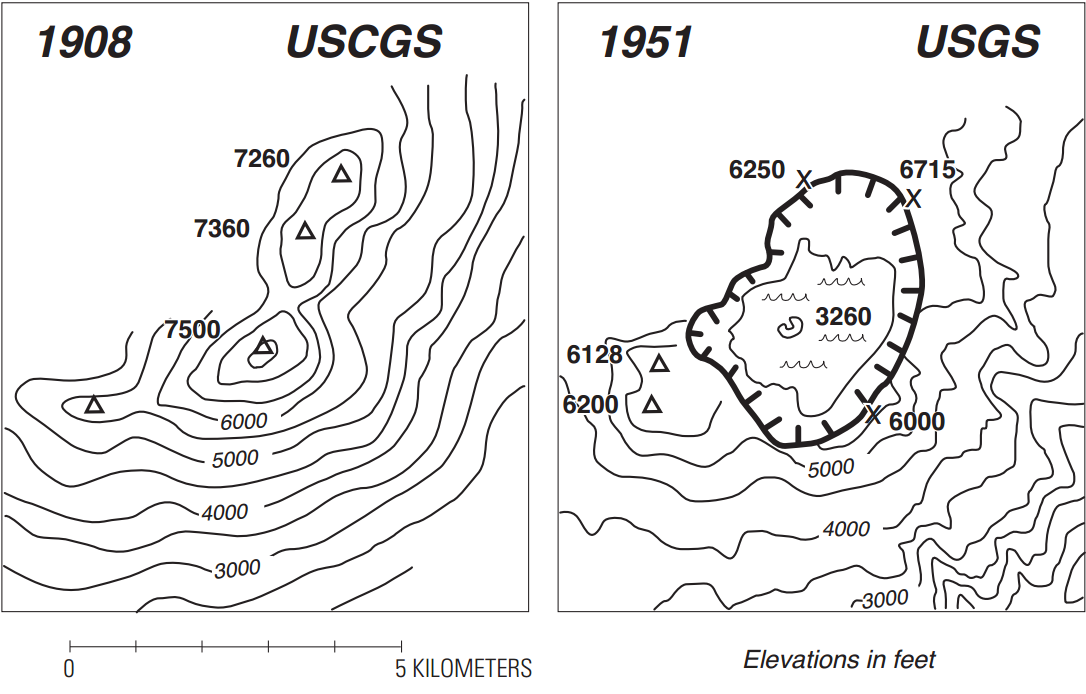
Katmai caldera before and after surveys of 1908 and 1951

Mount Katmai is one of five vents encircling the Novarupta volcano, source of the VEI 6 eruption and associated voluminous pyroclastic flows in 1912. Katmai consists chiefly of lava flows, pyroclastic rocks, and non-welded to agglutinated air fall. The Quaternary volcanic rocks at Katmai and adjacent cones are less than 5,000 ft (1,500 m) thick. Much of the volcano is mantled by snow and ice and several valley glaciers radiate out from the flanks.

Katmai volcano is built on the sedimentary rocks of the Naknek Formation of Late Jurassic age, which are exposed just west of the caldera rim at an elevation of about 5,000 feet (1,520 m), as well as north and southeast of the crater. Sedimentary rocks have been reported at an elevation of over 6,000 feet (1,830 m) in the west wall of the caldera and near the bottom of the eastern wall near 3,400 ft (1,040 m).

== Volcanic activity ==
Little is known about the historical activity of Katmai volcano before the great 1912 eruption. Early United States Coast and Geodetic Survey maps suggest a pre-caldera summit elevation of about 7,500 ft (2,300 m), and local villagers reported in 1898 that one of the volcanoes in the general area "smoked" occasionally.

Between June 6 and 9, 1912, the most spectacular Alaskan eruption in recorded history and the 20th century's largest measured volcanic eruption formed a large summit caldera at Katmai volcano. The eruption happened at a vent about 6 mi (10 km) to the west of Mount Katmai (at the Novarupta Volcano). For over 60 hours, the volcano erupted an estimated 6.7 cu mi (28 km^{3}) of ash flows and tephra representing 3.1 cu mi (13 km^{3}) of magma volume. The eruption produced a cloud of suffocating gas and ash that blackened the sky.

The inhabitants of the town of Kodiak, with ash falling on them, were led to the United States Revenue Cutter Service revenue cutter USRC Manning where they sheltered and were cared for by the crew, remaining in the harbor because Captain Perry determined "an attempt to leave here would be unwise" because the eruption made navigation dangerous.

The withdrawal of magma beneath Katmai resulted in the collapse of the summit area, forming the caldera. Following the subsidence, a small dacitic lava dome known as Horseshoe Island was emplaced on the floor of the caldera; this is the only juvenile material erupted from Katmai caldera during the historical eruption. It was visible at the time of the expedition in 1916, but has since been submerged by the crater lake. Still, the eruption from Katmai had a VEI of 3, and possibly involved phreatic eruptions. Following the eruption, thousands of fumaroles vented steam from the ash, creating the Valley of Ten Thousand Smokes.

In 1919, geologists noted a lake covering a large part of the caldera floor. By 1923 the lake was gone and numerous fumaroles, mud pots, and a large mud geyser had replaced it. The lake has since refilled to a depth of over 800 ft (240 m). Small glaciers have formed on a bench within the caldera beside the lake. Pumice still floats on Naknek Lake nearby.

== See also ==
- List of volcanoes in the United States

== Other sources ==
- "Katmai". Global Volcanism Program. Smithsonian Institution.
- Wood, Charles A.; Kienle, Jürgen, eds. (1990). Volcanoes of North America. Cambridge University Press. ISBN 0-521-43811-X.
