= Valley of Ten Thousand Smokes =

Valley within Katmai National Park and Preserve, Alaska, United States

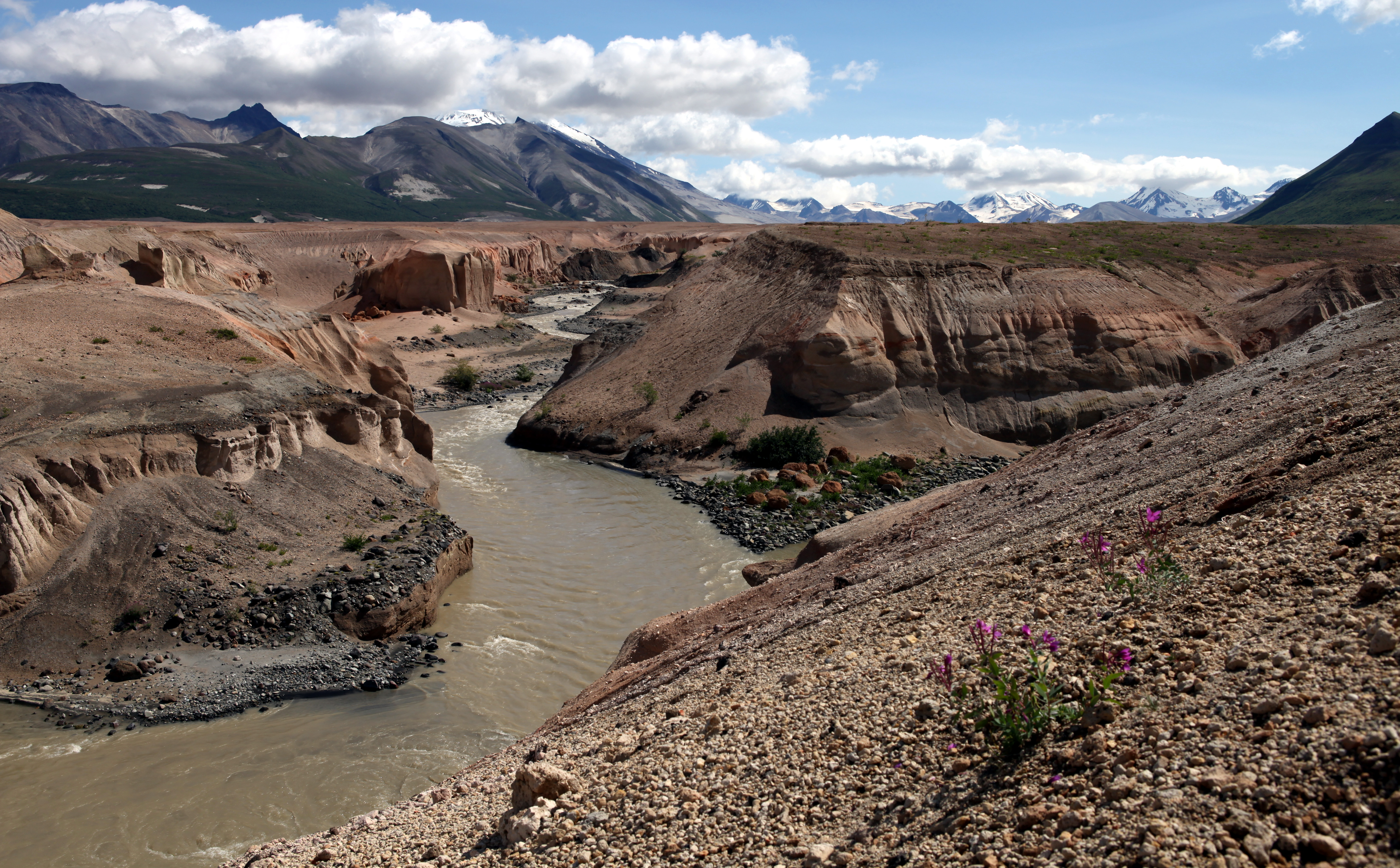
- Valley of Ten Thousand Smokes, July 2014

- Location within Alaska

Geography
- Coordinates: 58°23′38″N 155°23′07″W
- Interactive map of Valley of Ten Thousand Smokes

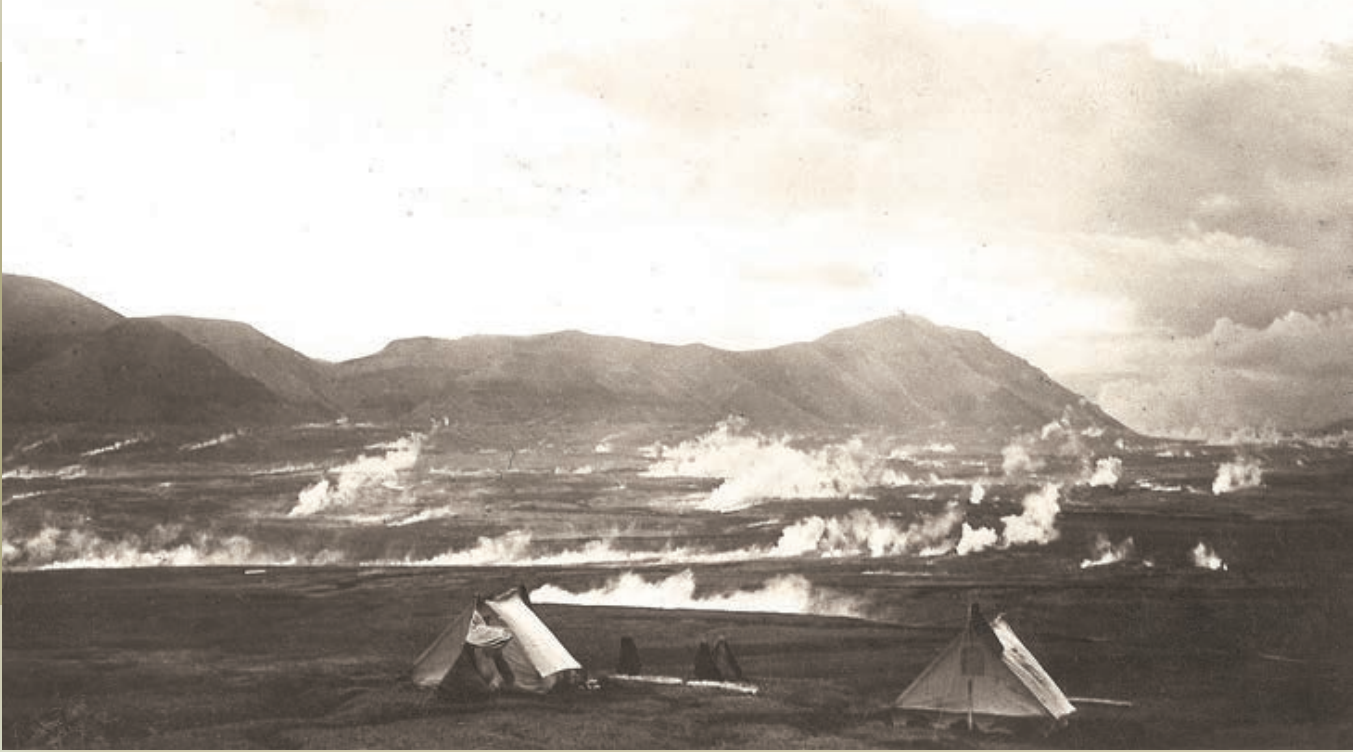
Griggs camp during the 1916 expedition clearly showing the numerous "smokes"

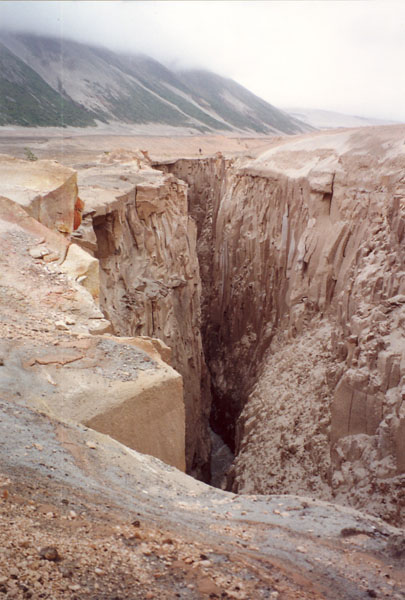
Knife Creek Gorge

The Valley of Ten Thousand Smokes is a valley within Katmai National Park and Preserve in Alaska which is filled with ash flow from the eruption of Novarupta on June 6–8, 1912. Following the eruption, thousands of fumaroles vented steam from the ash. Robert F. Griggs, who explored the volcano's aftermath for the National Geographic Society in 1916, gave the valley its name, saying that "the whole valley as far as the eye could reach was full of hundreds, no thousands—literally, tens of thousands—of smokes curling up from its fissured floor."

Prior to the eruption, the area now called the Valley of Ten Thousand Smokes was an unremarkable and unnamed portion of the Ukak River valley. Although never permanently inhabited by humans, it served as a pass for the Alutiiq people, as well as animals such as grizzly bears.

The 1912 eruption was the largest eruption by volume in the 20th century, erupting a magma volume of about 13 cubic kilometers (3.1 cu mi). As many as 14 major earthquakes between $M_\text{s}$ 6 to 7, and over 100 earthquakes greater than $M_\text{s}$ 5, resulted from the collapse of the caldera at Mount Katmai and movement within the magmatic plumbing system.

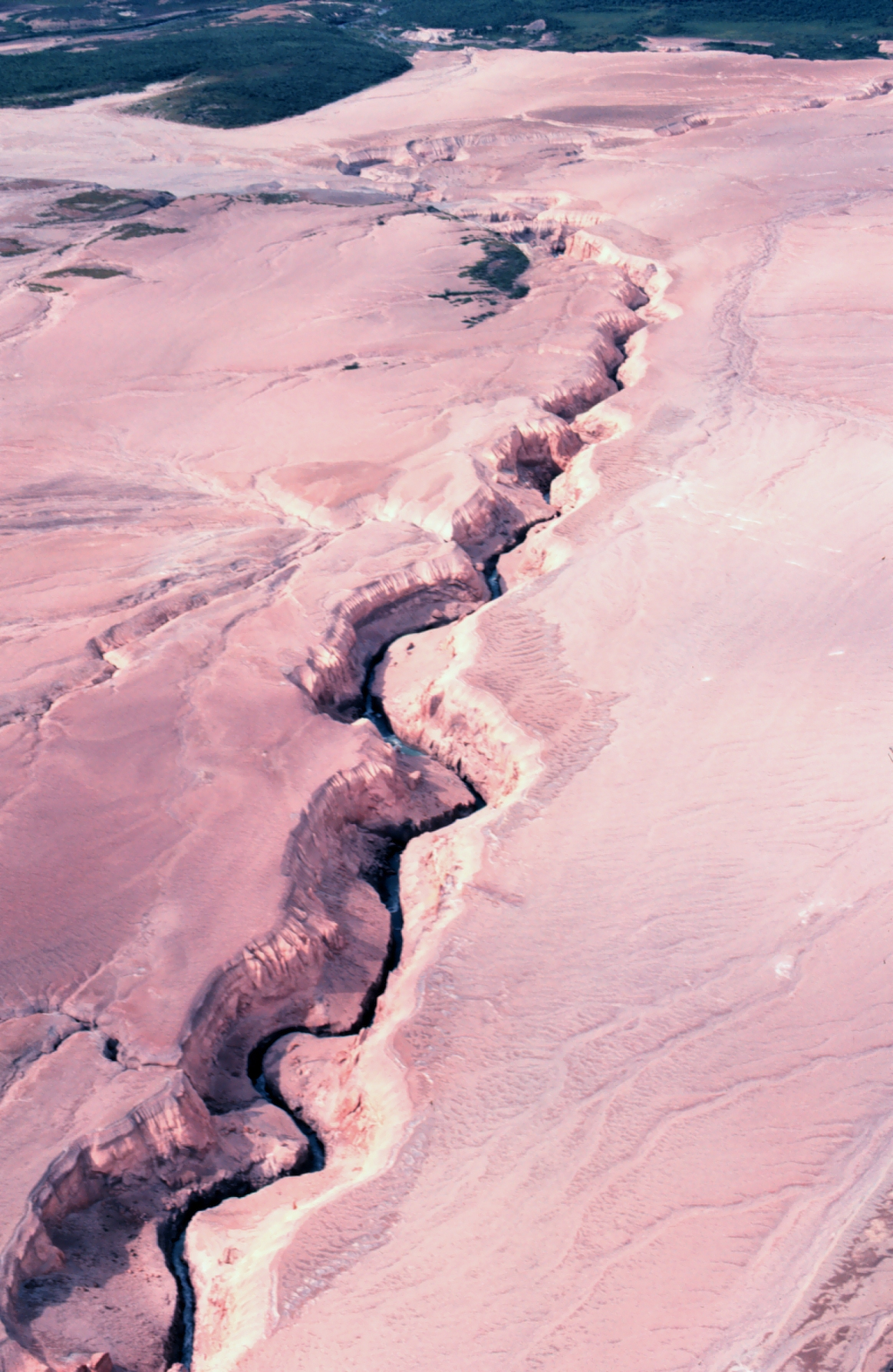
River eroding volcanic ash flow, Valley of Ten Thousand Smokes

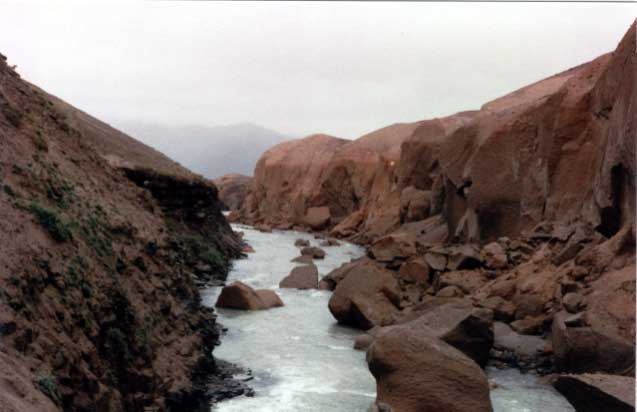
Canyon cut in ash by River Lethe

The ash-filled valley covers a 40-square-mile (100 km^{2}) area. The ash can be up to 700 feet (210 m) deep. In places deep canyons have been cut by the River Lethe, allowing observers to see the ash flow strata. Since the ash has cooled, most of the fumaroles are now extinct and despite its name the valley is no longer filled with 'smoke' (i.e. steam). Vegetation still does not grow in the valley. The signs of volcanic activity are still visible on nearby hills.

Katmai's most recent eruption was in 1927, but there have been non-eruptive events as recently as 2003. The Alaska Volcano Observatory still monitors Katmai's activity as part of the Katmai Cluster, where there are five active stratovolcanos within 15 kilometers (9 mi) of Katmai.

Visitors to the valley most commonly arrive via bus along the 20-mile (32 km) road from Brooks Camp, which is the only road in Katmai Park. The valley is a source of creative exploration by photographers and naturalists.

== Geology ==
Basement rocks in the area consist of the Late Jurassic Naknek Formation, which is composed of siltstones, and arkosic sandstones 1.7–2 km thick deposited in a marine shelf and submarine fan delta environment during the Oxfordian-Tithonian. Some 20 dioritic and granodioritic Tertiary plutons pierce the formation. Most prevalent though are the Quaternary stratovolcanoes along the Aleutian Arc associated with the Aleutian subduction zone.

The 1912 Novarupta eruption was characterized by three main episodes spanning 60 hours. Episode I included both a rhyolitic ignimbrite and a simultaneous Plinian dispersal of rhyolitic tephra fallout. The ignimbrite consisted of 9 separate packages of pumiceous pyroclastic flow deposits, radiating outward 9 km, and which filled 11 km^{3} of the valley to a depth of 100–200 m in the upper portion and 35 m in the lower over the span of 16 hours. It is indurated in the upper valley while nonwelded in the lower. The ignimbrite is noted for its fumaroles, phreatic craters, welded tuff, and flattened fiamme. At the same time, a Plinian dispersal of 8.8 km^{3} of rhyolitic tephra occurred depositing layers A and B. Episode II consisted of a second Plinian dispersal, but one consisting of dacite tephra, depositing 4.8 km^{3} of layers C and D. Episode III was also a Plinian dispersal of dacite tephra depositing 3.4 km^{3} of layers F and G.

The explosion from the eruption was heard as far away as Fairbanks and Juneau, while earthquakes continued until mid-Aug. Ball lightning near the ground was noted in addition to regular thunder and lightning, rare in South Alaska, while severe static disrupted wireless transmissions. Volcanic dust reached Wisconsin on June 8, Algeria on June 19 and California on June 21. Fields of pumice were seen floating in Katmai Bay, 241 km to the southwest, in 1913. Griggs noted 1000 fumarolic plumes over 500 feet high in 1916. In 1917, diffuse steam emanations were still evident and temperatures were 97 °C just 1 m below the surface. In 1918, Jasper Sayre and Paul Hagelbarger noted 86 vents with temperatures greater than 190 °C, the hottest being 432 °C. The steam was measured to be 99.5% water vapor with some acidic gases of HCl, CO_{2}, H_{2}S and HF. Only a few hundred emanations were seen by 1929, and just 10 were left by 1940.

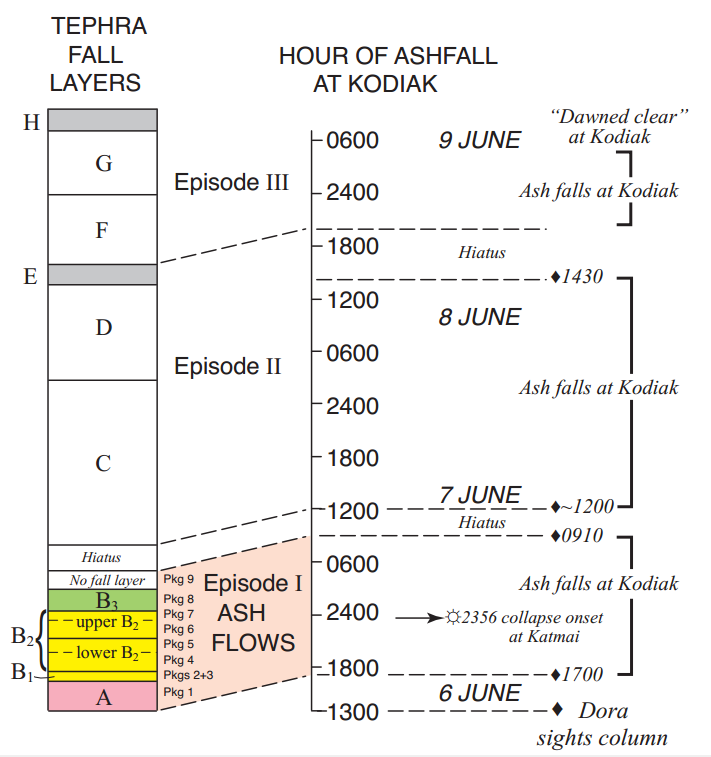
Time sequence of the 1912 Novarupta eruption showing three episodes of Plinian pumice falls over the span of 60 hours, and 9 packages of ignimbrite over the span of 16 hours

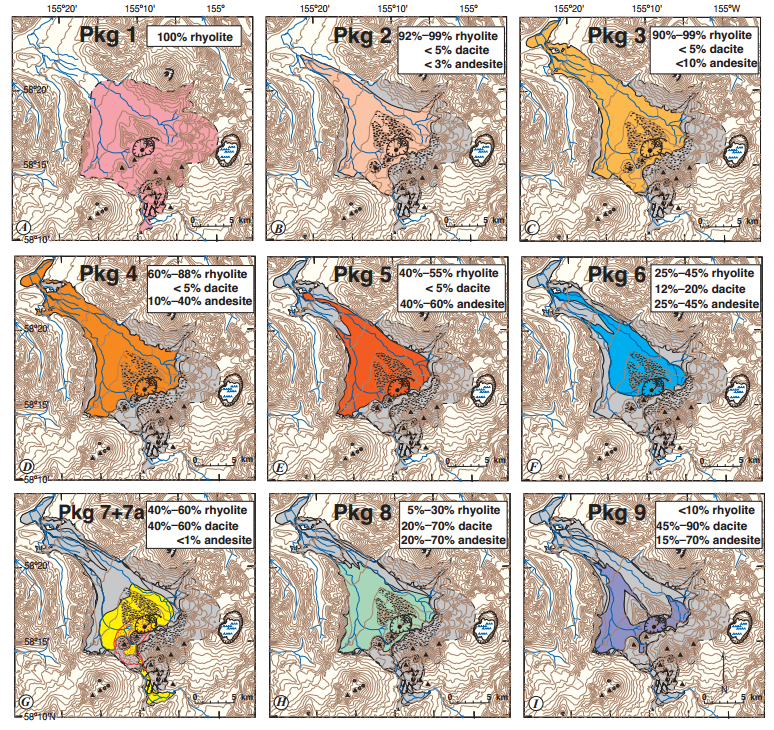
Sequence of 9 ignimbrite packages over the span of 16 hours during the 1912 Novarupta eruption

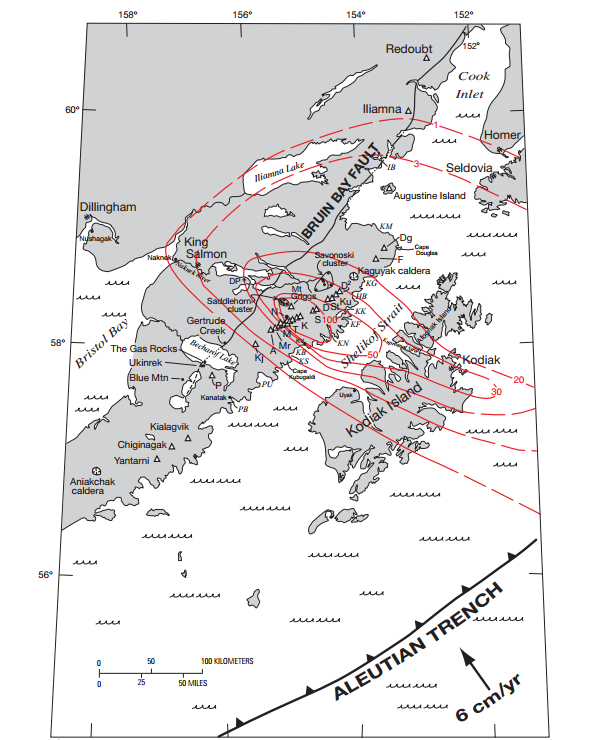
Contour lines, cm scale, showing accumulation of ash from 3 episodes of Plinian pumice falls over 60 hours during the 1912 Novarupta eruption

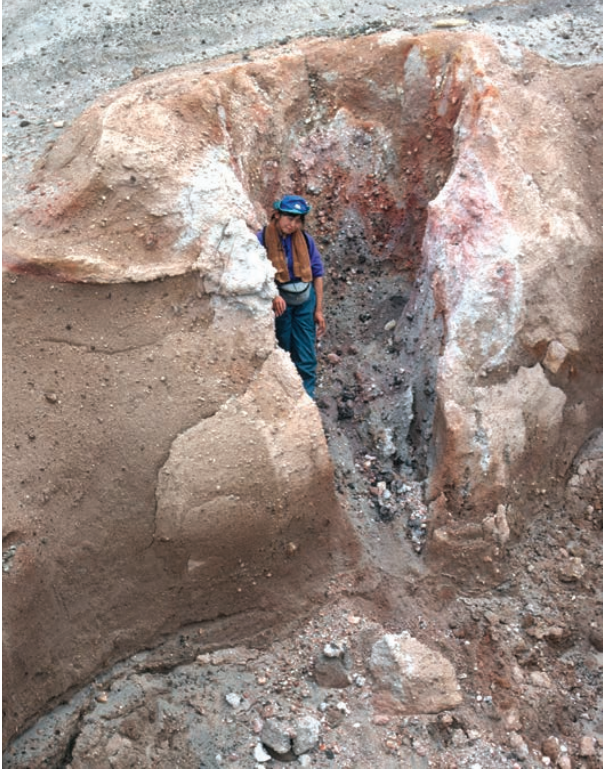
Funnel fumarole found in the valley

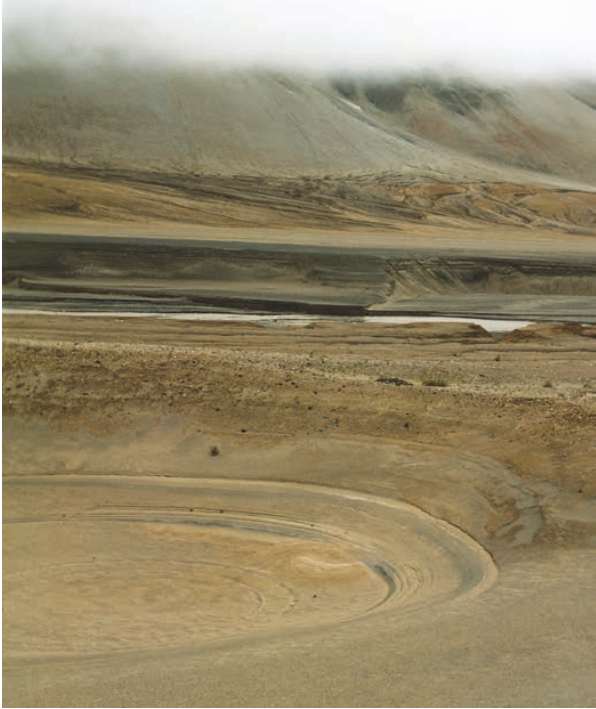
One of 60 phreatic craters, 20–60 m in diameter, with tuff rings and ejected welded ignimbrite

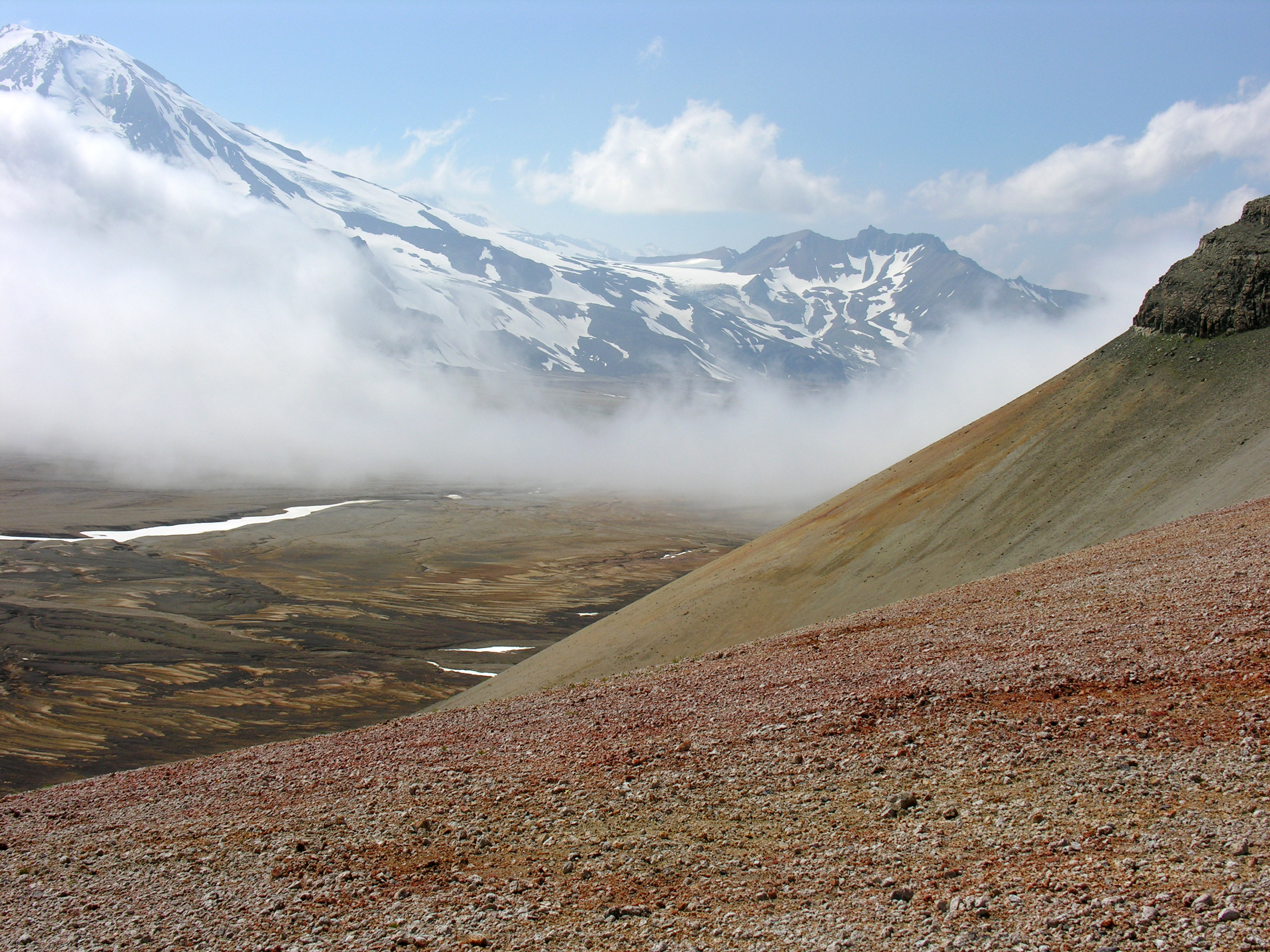
Springtime in the Valley of Ten Thousand Smokes

== Astronaut training ==
The Katmai Peninsula in general, and the valley in particular, were used by NASA and the USGS to geologically train the Apollo astronauts in recognizing volcanic features, landforms and materials, especially fumaroles and vents. Two separate groups of astronauts trained here, the first in June–July 1965 and a second group in August 1966. Their field exercises included simulating a lunar mission. "Playing the Moon game", involved pairing up astronauts and placing them in a location with very little prior information. They then planned traverses and collected representative samples. They communicated with their geologist instructors via radio. Astronauts who would use this training on the Moon included Apollo 11's Buzz Aldrin, Apollo 12's Alan Bean, Apollo 14's Edgar Mitchell, Apollo 15's James Irwin, Apollo 16's Charlie Duke, and Apollo 17's Gene Cernan and Jack Schmitt. Notable geologist instructors included Garniss Curtis and Gene Shoemaker.
