= Prediction of volcanic activity =

Research to predict volcanic activity

Prediction of volcanic activity, and volcanic eruption forecasting, is an interdisciplinary monitoring and research effort to predict the time and severity of a volcano's eruption. Of particular importance is the prediction of hazardous eruptions that could lead to catastrophic loss of life, property, and disruption of human activities.

Risk and uncertainty are central to forecasting and prediction, which are not necessarily the same thing in the context of volcanoes, where opinions have often played a role, and the prediction in time (forecasting) for an individual volcano is different from predicting eruption characteristics for apparently similar volcanoes. Both forecasting and prediction have processes based on past and present data.

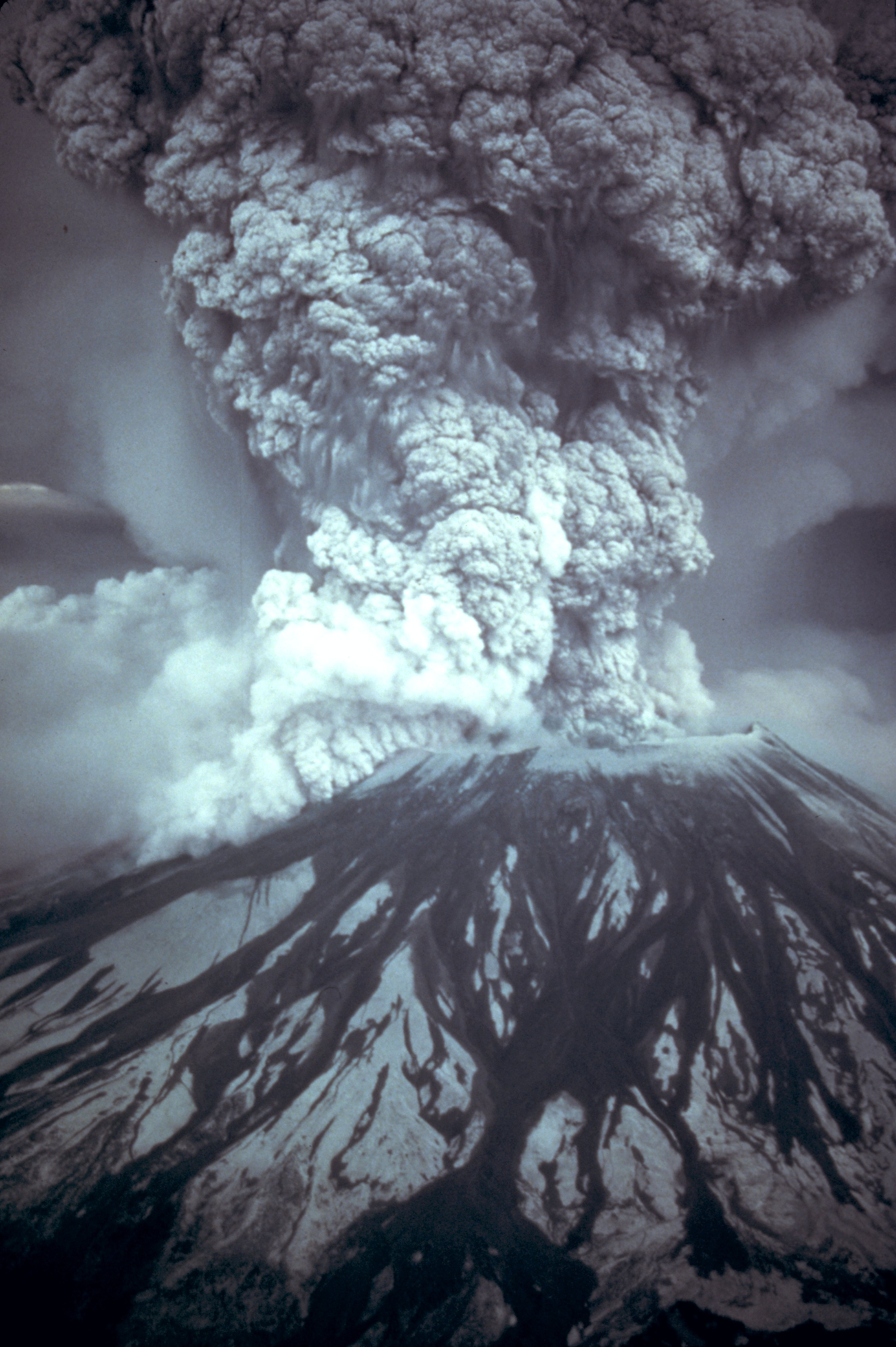
Mount St. Helens erupted explosively on May 18, 1980, at 8:32 a.m. PDT

== Seismic waves (seismicity) ==
=== General principles of volcano seismology ===
- Seismic activity (earthquakes and tremors) always occurs as volcanoes awaken and prepare to erupt and are a very important link to eruptions. Some volcanoes normally have continuing low-level seismic activity, but an increase may signal a greater likelihood of an eruption. The types of earthquakes that occur and where they start and end are also key signs. Volcanic seismicity has three major forms: short-period earthquake, long-period earthquake, and harmonic tremor.
- Short-period earthquakes are like normal fault-generated earthquakes. They are caused by the fracturing of brittle rock as magma forces its way upward. These short-period earthquakes signify the growth of a magma body near the surface and are known as 'A' waves. These types of seismic events are often also referred to as Volcano-Tectonic (or VT) events or earthquakes.
- Long-period earthquakes are believed to indicate increased gas pressure in a volcano's plumbing system. They are similar to the clanging sometimes heard in a house's plumbing system, which is known as "water hammer". These oscillations are the equivalent of acoustic vibrations in a chamber, in the context of magma chambers within the volcanic dome and are known as 'B' waves. These are also known as resonance waves and long period resonance events.
- Harmonic tremors are often the result of magma pushing against the overlying rock below the surface. They can sometimes be strong enough to be felt as humming or buzzing by people and animals, hence the name.

Patterns of seismicity are complex and often difficult to interpret; however, increasing seismic activity is a good indicator of increasing eruption risk, especially if long-period events become dominant and episodes of harmonic tremor appear.

Using a similar method, researchers can detect volcanic eruptions by monitoring infra-sound—sub-audible sound below 20 Hz. The IMS Global Infrasound Network, originally set up to verify compliance with nuclear test ban treaties, has 60 stations around the world that work to detect and locate erupting volcanoes.

=== Seismic case studies ===
A relation between long-period events and imminent volcanic eruptions was first observed in the seismic records of the 1985 eruption of Nevado del Ruiz in Colombia. The occurrence of long-period events were then used to predict the 1989 eruption of Mount Redoubt in Alaska and the 1993 eruption of Galeras in Colombia. In December 2000, scientists at the National Center for Prevention of Disasters in Mexico City predicted an eruption within two days at Popocatépetl, on the outskirts of Mexico City. Their prediction used research that had been done by Bernard Chouet, a Swiss volcanologist who was working at the United States Geological Survey and who first observed a relation between long-period events and an imminent eruption. The government evacuated tens of thousands of people; 48 hours later, the volcano erupted as predicted. It was Popocatépetl's largest eruption for a thousand years, yet no one was hurt.

=== Iceberg tremors ===
Similarities between iceberg tremors, which can be observed when they run aground, and volcanic tremors were postulated to help experts develop a better method for predicting volcanic eruptions. As icebergs have much simpler structures than volcanoes, the cause of tremors is easier to model. The similarities between volcanic and iceberg tremors included long durations and amplitudes, as well as common shifts in frequencies. These observations with refinement modelling of the causes of both types of tremors allowed the later development of better automatic detection mechanisms for some volcanic eruptions.

=== Gas emissions ===
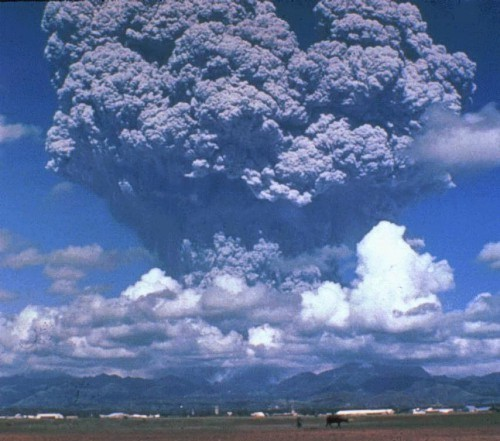
Gas and ash plume erupted from Mount Pinatubo, Philippines.

As magma nears the surface and its pressure decreases, gases escape. This process is much like what happens when you open a bottle of fizzy drink and carbon dioxide escapes. Sulfur dioxide is one of the main components of volcanic gases, and increasing amounts of it herald the arrival of increasing amounts of magma near the surface. For example, on May 13, 1991, an increasing amount of sulfur dioxide was released from Mount Pinatubo in the Philippines. On May 28, just two weeks later, sulfur dioxide emissions had increased to 5,000 tonnes, ten times the earlier amount. Mount Pinatubo later erupted on June 12, 1991. On several occasions, such as before the Mount Pinatubo eruption and the 1993 Galeras, Colombia eruption, sulfur dioxide emissions have dropped to low levels prior to eruptions. Most scientists believe that this drop in gas levels is caused by the sealing of gas passages by hardened magma. Such an event leads to increased pressure in the volcano's plumbing system and an increased chance of an explosive eruption. A multi-component gas analyzer system (Multi-GAS) is an instrument package used to take real-time high-resolution measurements of volcanic gas plumes. Multi-GAS measurements of CO_{2}/SO_{2} ratios can allow detection of the pre-eruptive degassing of rising magmas, improving prediction of volcanic activity.

=== Ground deformation ===
Swelling of a volcano signals that magma has accumulated near the surface. Scientists monitoring an active volcano will often measure the tilt of the slope and track changes in the rate of swelling. An increased rate of swelling, especially if accompanied by an increase in sulfur dioxide emissions and harmonic tremors is a high probability sign of an impending event. The deformation of Mount St. Helens prior to the May 18, 1980 eruption was a classic example of deformation, as the north side of the volcano was bulging upwards as magma was building up underneath. Most cases of ground deformation are usually detectable only by sophisticated equipment used by scientists, but they can still predict future eruptions this way. The Hawaiian volcanoes show significant ground deformation; there is inflation of the ground prior to an eruption and then an obvious deflation post-eruption. This is due to the shallow magma chamber of the Hawaiian volcanoes; movement of the magma is easily noticed on the ground above.

=== Thermal monitoring ===
Both magma movement, changes in gas release and hydrothermal activity can lead to thermal emissivity changes at the volcano's surface. These can be measured using several techniques:

- forward looking infrared radiometry (FLIR) from hand-held devices, installed on-site, at a distance, or airborne;
- infrared band satellite imagery;
- in-situ thermometry (hot springs, fumaroles)
- heat flux maps
- geothermal well enthalpy changes

=== Hydrology ===
There are 4 main methods that can be used to predict a volcanic eruption through the use of hydrology:

- Borehole and well hydrologic and hydraulic measurements are increasingly used to monitor changes in a volcanoes subsurface gas pressure and thermal regime. Increased gas pressure will make water levels rise and suddenly drop right before an eruption, and thermal focusing (increased local heat flow) can reduce or dry out aquifers.
- Detection of lahars and other debris flows close to their sources. USGS scientists have developed an inexpensive, durable, portable and easily installed system to detect and continuously monitor the arrival and passage of debris flows and floods in river valleys that drain active volcanoes.
- Pre-eruption sediment may be picked up by a river channel surrounding the volcano that shows that the actual eruption may be imminent. Most sediment is transported from volcanically disturbed watersheds during periods of heavy rainfall. This can be an indication of morphological changes and increased hydrothermal activity in absence of instrumental monitoring techniques.
- Volcanic deposit that may be placed on a river bank can easily be eroded which will dramatically widen or deepen the river channel. Therefore, monitoring of the river channels width and depth can be used to assess the likelihood of a future volcanic eruption.

=== Remote sensing ===
Remote sensing is the detection by a satellite's sensors of electromagnetic energy that is absorbed, reflected, radiated or scattered from the surface of a volcano or from its erupted material in an eruption cloud.

- 'Cloud sensing: Scientists can monitor the unusually cold eruption clouds from volcanoes using data from two different thermal wavelengths to enhance the visibility of eruption clouds and discriminate them from meteorological clouds
- 'Gas sensing: Sulfur dioxide can also be measured by remote sensing at some of the same wavelengths as ozone. Total Ozone Mapping Spectrometers (TOMS) can measure the amount of sulfur dioxide gas released by volcanoes in eruptions. Carbon dioxide emissions from volcanoes have been detected in the short-wave infrared using NASA's Orbiting Carbon Observatory 2.
- Thermal sensing: The presence of new significant thermal signatures or 'hot spots' may indicate new heating of the ground before an eruption, represent an eruption in progress or the presence of a very recent volcanic deposit, including lava flows or pyroclastic flows.
- Deformation sensing: Satellite-borne spatial radar data can be used to detect long-term geometric changes in the volcanic edifice, such as uplift and depression. In this method, interferometric synthetic aperture radar (InSAR), digital elevation models generated from radar imagery are subtracted from each other to yield a differential image, displaying rates of topographic change.
- Forest monitoring: Recently, it has been demonstrated that the location of eruptive fractures could be predicted, months to years before the eruptions, by the monitoring of forest growth. This tool based on the monitoring of the trees growth has been validated at both Mt. Niyragongo and Mt. Etna during the 2002–2003 volcano eruptive events.
- Infrasound sensing: A relatively new approach to detecting volcanic eruptions involves using infrasound sensors from the International Monitoring System (IMS) infrasound network. This method of detection takes signals from multiple sensors and uses triangulation to determine the location of the eruption.

=== Mass movements and mass failures ===
Monitoring mass movements and failures uses techniques lending from seismology (geophones), deformation, and meteorology. Landslides, rock falls, pyroclastic flows, and mud flows (lahars) are example of mass failures of volcanic material before, during, and after eruptions.

The most famous volcanic landslide was probably the failure of a bulge that built up from intruding magma before the Mt. St. Helens eruption in 1980, this landslide "uncorked" the shallow magmatic intrusion causing catastrophic failure and an unexpected lateral eruption blast. Rock falls often occur during periods of increased deformation and can be a sign of increased activity in absence of instrumental monitoring. Mud flows (lahars) are remobilized hydrated ash deposits from pyroclastic flows and ash fall deposits, moving downslope even at very shallow angles at high speed. Because of their high density they are capable of moving large objects such as loaded logging trucks, houses, bridges, and boulders. Their deposits usually form a second ring of debris fans around volcanic edifices, the inner fan being primary ash deposits. Downstream of the deposition of their finest load, lahars can still pose a sheet flood hazard from the residual water. Lahar deposits can take many months to dry out, until they can be walked on. The hazards derived from lahar activity can exist several years after a large explosive eruption.

A team of US scientists developed a method of predicting lahars. Their method was developed by analyzing rocks on Mount Rainier in Washington. The warning system depends on noting the differences between fresh rocks and older ones. Fresh rocks are poor conductors of electricity and become hydrothermically altered by water and heat. Therefore, if they know the age of the rocks, and therefore the strength of them, they can predict the pathways of a lahar. A system of Acoustic Flow Monitors (AFM) has also been emplaced on Mount Rainier to analyze ground tremors that could result in a lahar, providing an earlier warning.

== Local case studies ==
=== Nyiragongo ===
The eruption of Mount Nyiragongo on January 17, 2002, was predicted a week earlier by a local expert who had been studying the volcanoes for years. He informed the local authorities and a UN survey team was dispatched to the area; however, it was declared safe. Unfortunately, when the volcano erupted, 40% of the city of Goma was destroyed along with many people's livelihoods. The expert claimed that he had noticed small changes in the local relief and had monitored the eruption of a much smaller volcano two years earlier. Since he knew that these two volcanoes were connected by a small fissure, he knew that Mount Nyiragongo would erupt soon.

=== Mount Etna ===
British geologists have developed a method of predicting future eruptions of Mount Etna. They have discovered that there is a time lag of 25 years between events. Monitoring of deep crust events can help predict accurately what will happen in the years to come. So far they have predicted that between 2007 and 2015, volcanic activity will be half of what it was in 1972. Other methods of predicting volcanic activity is by examining the increase of CO_{2}/SO_{2} ratios. These ratios will indicate pre-eruptive degassing of magma chambers. A team of researchers used Mount Etna for this research by observing gases such as H_{2}O, CO_{2}, and SO_{2}. The team did a real-time monitoring of Mount Etna before it experienced eruptions in July and December 2006. These CO_{2}/SO_{2} ratios are useful in that the increase of these ratios are a predecessor to upcoming eruptions due to the acceleration of gas-rich magmas and replenishes the magma chamber. In the two years of observations that the team conducted, the increase of these ratios are a precursor to upcoming eruptions. It was recorded that in the months prior before an eruption, the ratios increased and led to an eruption after it had reached its peak amount. It was concluded that measuring H_{2}O, CO_{2}, and SO_{2} can be a useful method to predict volcanic activity, especially at Mount Etna. Mount Etna's prediction of volcanic activity can also be used with 4D microgravity analysis. This type of analysis uses GPS and synthetic aperture radar interferometry (InSAR). It can measure the changes in density, and afterwards, can retrieve a model to show magma movements and spatial scales that are occurring within a volcanic system. Back in 2001, gravity models detected that there was a decrease in the mass of Mount Etna of 2.5×10^{11} kg. Eventually, there was a sudden increase in the mass two weeks prior to an eruption. The volcano made up for this decrease in magma by retrieving more magma from its storage zone to bring up to the upper levels of the plumbing system. Due to this retrieval, it led to an eruption. The microgravity studies that were performed by this team shows the migration of magma and gas within a magma chamber prior to any eruption, which can be a useful method to any prediction of volcanic activity.

=== Sakurajima, Japan ===
Sakurajima is possibly one of the most monitored areas on earth. The Sakurajima Volcano lies near Kagoshima City, which has a population of over 500,000 people. Both the Japanese Meteorological Agency (JMA) and Kyoto University's Sakurajima Volcanological Observatory (SVO) monitors the volcano's activity. Since 1995, Sakurajima has only erupted from its summit with no release of lava.

Monitoring techniques at Sakurajima:

- Likely activity is signalled by swelling of the land around the volcano as magma below begins to build up. At Sakurajima, this is marked by a rise in the seabed in Kagoshima Bay – tide levels rise as a result.
- As magma begins to flow, melting and splitting base rock can be detected as volcanic earthquakes. At Sakurajima, they occur two to five kilometres beneath the surface. An underground observation tunnel is used to detect volcanic earthquakes more reliably.
- Groundwater levels begin to change, the temperature of hot springs may rise and the chemical composition and amount of gases released may alter. Temperature sensors are placed in bore holes which are used to detect ground water temp. Remote sensing is used on Sakurajima since the gases are highly toxic – the ratio of HCl gas to SO_{2} gas increases significantly shortly before an eruption.
- As an eruption approaches, tiltmeter systems measure minute movements of the mountain. Data is relayed in real-time to monitoring systems at SVO.
- Seismometers detect earthquakes which occur immediately beneath the crater, signaling the onset of the eruption. They occur 1 to 1.5 seconds before the explosion.
- With the passing of an explosion, the tiltmeter system records the settling of the volcano.

== Mitigations ==
Going beyond predicting volcanic activity, there are highly speculative proposals to prevent explosive volcanic activity by cooling the magma chambers using geothermal power generation techniques.

== See also ==
- Decade Volcanoes
- Deep Earth Carbon Degassing Project
- Earthquake prediction
- Istituto Nazionale di Geofisica e Vulcanologia
- United States Geological Survey
- Jökulhlaup
- Ice cauldrons
