= Tornillo =

Tornillo can mean:

- Tornillo, Texas
- Tornillo tent city
- Tornillo (album), a 2022 album by Whiskey Myers
- Tornillo, an album by Glen Phillips
- tornillo event, a low-frequency volcanic seismic event
- Any of several species of trees in the genus Prosopis, including:
  - Prosopis pubescens
  - Prosopis reptans, a species of Mesquite
- Mark Tornillo, lead vocalist for Accept, a German rock band
- Miami Herald Publishing Co. v. Tornillo, a case decided by the U.S. Supreme Court in 1974
