= Tornillo event =

Seismic event associated with volcanoes

A tornillo event is a low-frequency seismic event associated with volcanoes. The term, which means "screw" in Spanish, was coined in the mid-1990s at the Observatorio Vulcanológico y Sismológico de Pasto (OVSP) in Pasto, Colombia to describe seismic events seen at the Galeras volcano.

A tornillo has the following characteristics that distinguish it from other seismic events:

- very limited distribution of frequencies (monochromatic)
- a long coda that decays slowly
- small amplitude

Like volcanic tremor, tornillos are thought to be caused by magma moving at depth.
