= 2009 Mount Redoubt eruptive activity =

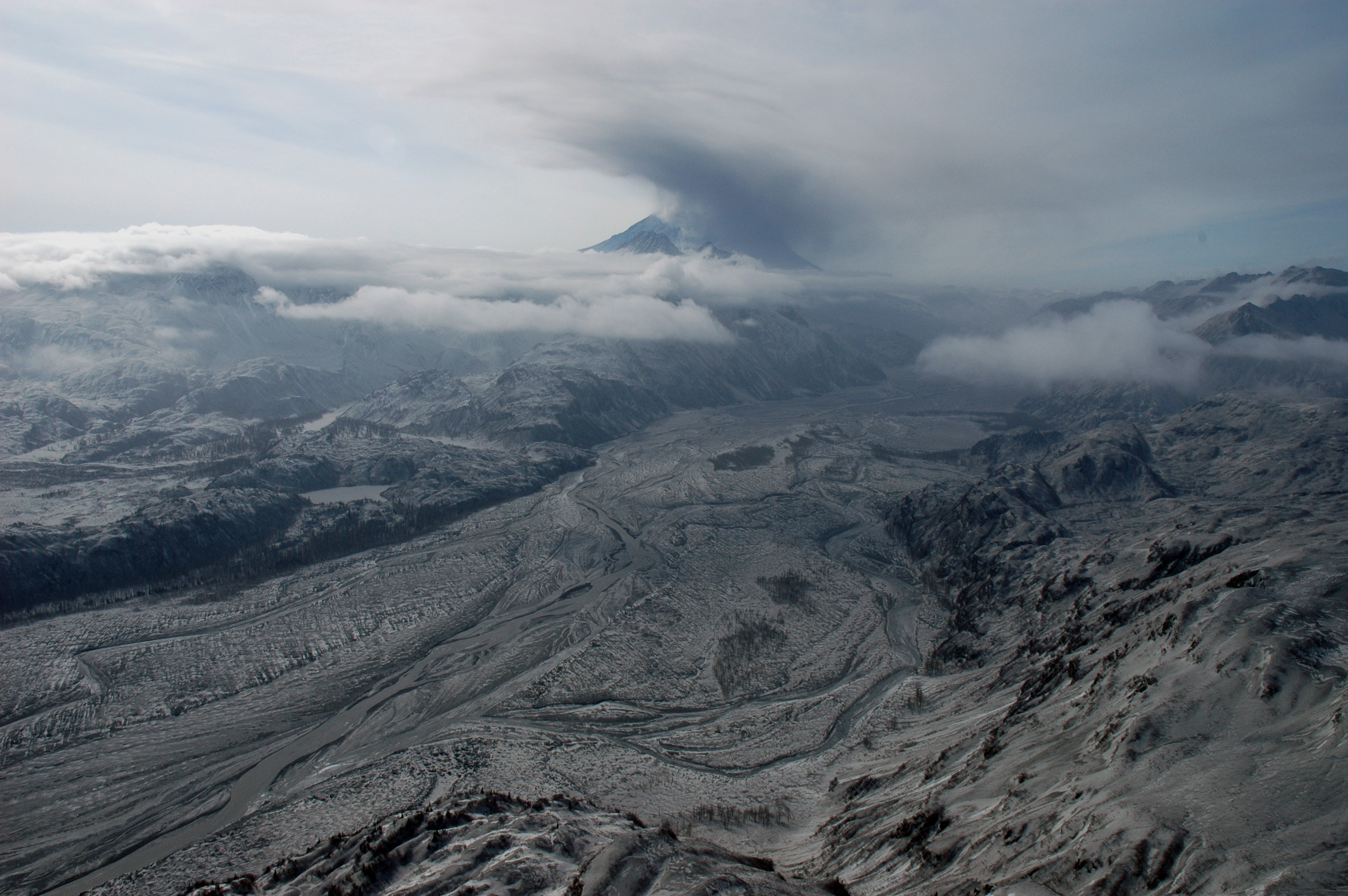
- Mount Redoubt on March 31, 2009. An ash cloud is hanging over the summit and the valley is covered in volcanic ash.
- Volcano: Mount Redoubt
- Start date: March 15, 2009
- End date: July 1, 2009
- Type: Plinian, subplinian
- Location: Kenai Peninsula Borough, Alaska, United States; 60.485°N 152.743°W
- VEI: 3

Alaska's Mount Redoubt volcano began erupting on March 22, 2009, and activity continued for several months.

During the eruptions, reports found ash clouds reaching as high as 65,000 feet (20,000 m) above sea level. In response, the National Weather Service issued a series of ash fall advisories. The Mat-Su Valley, Anchorage, Valdez and large portions of the Kenai Peninsula all received coatings of tephra. The 2009 eruptions of Mount Redoubt represented the most seismic activity occurring on the mountain in twenty years.

== Renewed concerns over the Drift River Terminal Facility ==
The 2009 eruptions of Mount Redoubt renewed concerns over the safety of the nearby tank farm which holds crude oil, known as the Drift River Terminal Facility. During the earlier, 1989–90 eruptions of Redoubt, the facility was inundated and damaged by lahars. Dikes built after the 1989–90 activity protected the tanks, although an aircraft hangar and runway were flooded and damaged by the flooding and related debris. In late March the US Coast Guard decided to move the millions of gallons located at the facility to prevent an ecological disaster. The plan called for then refilling the tanks with "harmless" ballast water to prevent them from being dislodged by flooding.

However, on April 5, the Coast Guard stated that filling the empty tanks with ballast water was not possible, because it would create a hazardous waste that the neither the facility nor the Coast Guard was prepared to deal with afterward. Instead, the oil was removed and the empty tanks remained vulnerable to damage from further flooding. In the meantime, oil production in Cook Inlet was suspended, because the tank farms were out of commission while Mount Redoubt remained in an eruptive state.

When the eruptions subsided, the tanks were undamaged and the facility was cleared of debris and subsequently reopened.

== Eruptive activity ==
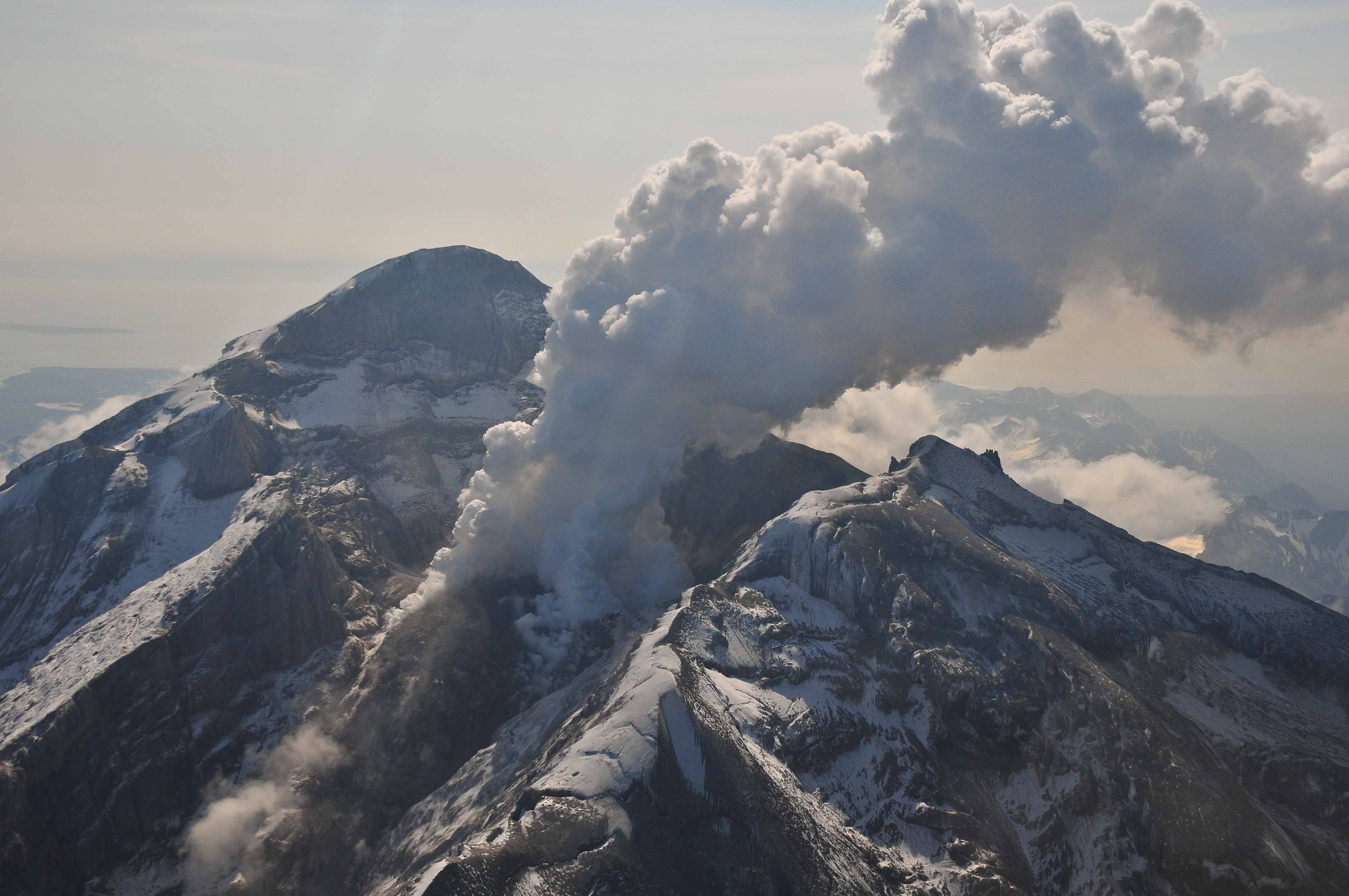
Ash plume from Redoubt's active lava dome on May 8

As of April 4, 2009, AVO had recorded twenty-six volcanic eruptions and/or explosions at Redoubt volcano, although they singled out nineteen of them as most notable. The AVO refers to an "eruption" as any event which discharges ash into the atmosphere, while adding the term "explosion" for more vigorous events. The AVO did not rate and compare each eruption, although the 9:24 am eruption on March 26 reached an altitude of 65,000 feet making it the highest volcanic ash cloud to date during the 2009 phase of activity. The eruption on April 4 was described as being the biggest eruption to date. There were also periods when the volcano emitted notable amounts of steam but did not erupt.

Doppler weather radar of third summit explosion on March 23

The AVO reported that Redoubt erupted or exhibited other notable activity at the following times, with all ash cloud heights in feet above sea level:

- March 15 01:00 pm First emissions of steam and ash to occur before the first major eruptions began on March 22.
- March 22 10:38 pm
- March 22 11:02 pm
- March 23 12:14 am
- March 23 01:39 am
- March 23 04:31 am
- March 23 07:41 pm
- March 25 05:12 am
- March 25 10:17 am
- March 26 08:34 am
- March 26 09:24 am Ash cloud reached 65,000 feet
- March 26 11:47 pm
- March 27 08:40 am
- March 27 05:35 pm Ash cloud reached 40,000 feet
- March 27 07:25 pm Ash cloud reached 51,000 feet
- March 27 11:20 pm Ash cloud reached 41,000 feet
- March 28 01:20 am Ash cloud reached 50,000 feet
- March 28 01:40 pm Ash cloud reached 25,000 feet
- March 28 03:29 pm Ash cloud reached 35,000 feet. Tephra from this event fell in Anchorage and Valdez.
- March 28 07:23 pm Ash cloud reached 45,000 feet
- March 29 + 30 11:23 pm – approx. 3 am Ash reaching under 25,000 feet. Preceded by an unrelated magnitude 5.4 earthquake near Kodiak.
- March 30 09:44 am Ash cloud reached 27,000 feet. Small, continued ash eruption with related tremor ended after approx. 10 minutes
- March 30 10:40 am Nearly continuous ash cloud reached 20,000 feet.
- March 30 11:26 pm Ash cloud reached 25,000 feet. Strong thermal anomalies suggest a new lava dome is growing at the summit.
- March 31 04:07 pm Ash cloud reached 25,000 feet
- March 31 – April 4 Mount Redoubt emitted a nearly continuous plume of steam, ash and gas at low levels. This was a continuation of the March 31 event and not new activity.
- April 4 05:58 am Ash cloud reached 50,000 feet. A related lahar flooded the Drift River Valley and damaged a generator facility at the nearby tank farm. The ash cloud drifted southeast and left a heavy coating of tephra on portions of the Kenai Peninsula. This has been described as the largest eruption to date during the current cycle, although it did not create the highest plume.
- Since April 4, Mount Redoubt has remained in a constant state of mild eruption and dome building at its summit. The Alaska Volcano Observatory warns that more a more vigorous eruption may occur at any time, possibly due to a potential collapse of the new dome. In late May, 2009, activity decreased and the Alaska Volcano Observatory lowered the alert level.
- A nearly six-month period of relative quiet at the volcano ended on December 27, 2009, with renewed earthquake swarms. The AVO subsequently raised the alert level, and again warned of the possibility of a more vigorous eruption due to dome collapse.

== Aftermath of 2009 eruptions and prognosis for future activity ==
On April 11, 2009, the Alaska Volcano Observatory released the following statement into the public domain on their USGS affiliated website regarding the aftermath of the 2009 eruptions of Mount Redoubt, and a prognosis for future activity.

Summary

The 2009 eruption of Redoubt Volcano continues. A lava dome is currently growing in the summit crater, accompanied by intermittent emissions of volcanic gases and minor amounts of ash. Additional explosive events are likely and could send ash to greater than 30,000 feet above sea level. Such a cycle of dome growth and explosive dome destruction may continue for many months. The potential for lahars (volcanic mudflows) and other flooding down the Drift River Valley remains, as does the potential for trace to minor ash fall on communities near Redoubt (e.g., the Kenai Peninsula Borough, The Municipality of Anchorage, and the Matanuska-Susitna Borough, and possibly more distant areas).

Observations

The 2009 eruption of Redoubt Volcano began with a minor explosion of steam and ash just after 13:00 AKDT on March 15. Major explosive events began at approximately 22:40 March 22 AKDT, and since then AVO has recorded more than 19 separate explosions. Plume heights, as measured by radar and confirmed by pilot reports, have exceeded 50,000 feet (15 km) above sea level on multiple occasions. To date, the largest explosion occurred at 05:55 AKDT April 4, lasted more than 30 minutes, and is comparable in size to the largest event of the 1989/1990 Redoubt eruption.

Three major lahars (volcanic mudflows), on March 23, March 26, and April 4, have inundated the Drift River Valley and its downstream coastal fan. All of these reached the Cook Inlet and affected the Drift River Oil Terminal (DROT). The peak discharge rates of these lahars remains under investigation, but all are considered significant, and the April 4 event may have exceeded the size of any lahar observed during the 1989/1990 eruption. Smaller lahars that did not impact DROT have also occurred.

Several of Redoubt's recent explosions have resulted in measurable ash fall over populated areas as distant as Delta Junction (340 miles northeast of Redoubt), with more significant ash fall in more proximate areas, including the Susitna Valley, the Kenai Peninsula and the Anchorage bowl. On the afternoon of March 28, ash fall in Anchorage closed the airport from 17:00 until 07:00 the next morning (March 29). The maximum ash fall measured so far in a populated area is about 1/16 inch (1.5 mm) near Seldovia following the April 4 explosion. A measurement of about 1/8 inch (3 mm) following the explosion on March 26, was recorded near Silver Salmon Creek Lodge, about 30 miles (48 km) south of the volcano. Trace ash fall has also been observed between explosive events during times when the volcano is emitting a continuous low altitude (< 15,000 feet ASL) gas and ash plume.

A rich variety of seismic signals have been recorded at Redoubt throughout the eruption and in the preceding months of unrest. These seismic events include: (1) typical "rock-breaking" earthquakes; (2) volcanic "tremor", indicative of steam and other volcanic gases or fluids vigorously propagating through cracks; (3) large, far-reaching, "cigar-shaped" signals resulting from volcanic explosions; (4) ground shaking from lahars as they pass nearby seismometers; and (5) small, repetitive, self-similar events associated with the slow extrusion of lava (this kind of extrusion is often referred to as "dome building"). More than 1700 earthquakes have been located since mid-January, and many more occurred that were either too small or of such a character as to make location impossible. Typically, the magnitudes of these events are small, the average being around M0.5. However, on April 9 a magnitudeM_{L} 3.3 earthquake occurred about 2.5 miles (4 km) E/NE of Redoubt's summit, possibly resulting from a crustal adjustment to the ongoing withdrawal from Redoubt's subterranean magma reservoir.

Since the fall of 2008, AVO has flown 13 gas measurement flights, and of these, 5 have occurred since the eruption began on March 15, 2009. Elevated carbon dioxide (CO_{2}) emission rates (up to 2000 tonnes/day) were measured in October–November, 2008. Starting in late January 2009, and coincident with a strong increase in seismicity, gas emission rates rose to a level (> 5000 tonnes/d) suggesting significant unrest at the volcano, and emissions stayed at this level until the eruption began. Since that time, emissions of both CO_{2} and sulfur dioxide (SO_{2}) have been very elevated, sometimes reaching levels in excess of 10,000 tonnes/d. These volcanic gas emission rates are among the largest ever measured in Alaska, though such high values are consistent with an openly degassing volcanic system that is actively extruding lava. Based on measurements and observations from Redoubt's previously observed eruptions, these gas emission rates are likely to drop substantially when the eruption wanes.

The combination of gas and ash emission from Redoubt since the beginning of the eruption has on occasion resulted in a brownish-yellow volcanic haze in the Cook Inlet region. The volcanic haze contains small quantities of ash, water vapor, sulfur aerosols, and liquid droplets suspended in the air. The main concerns for human health in volcanic haze consist of ash, sulfur dioxide gas (SO_{2}), and sulfuric acid droplets (H_{2}SO_{4}), which forms when volcanic SO_{2} oxidizes in the atmosphere. Volcanic haze can be both an eye and respiratory irritant. The State of Alaska Epidemiology Bulletin No. 5 summarizes the health effects associated with volcanic emissions and is available on the web at http://www.epi.hss.state.ak.us/bulletins/docs/b2006_05.pdf.

Visual and satellite observations show that by March 27, a deep crater about a half mile (800 m) across formed in the middle of the summit amphitheater, likely from one or more of the explosions during the early stage of the eruption. By April 4, a north/south elongated lava dome, about a half mile (800 m) long had grown out of the new crater, at an elevation of around 8,000 feet (2,400 m) above sea level. Most if not all of this dome was destroyed during the large explosion of April 4. A large amount of ice and snow has been removed from the upper Drift Glacier. The Drift River Valley has also been mostly denuded of snow and is covered with lahar deposits. The latest observations, as of about April 9, show a growing lava dome in about the same place as the previous dome. This new dome is about a quarter mile (400 meters) in diameter, and roughly circular as viewed from above.

Prognosis and Ongoing Hazards

The 2009 Redoubt eruption began with a series of large explosions on March 22–23, followed by less-energetic dome growth in the summit crater. On April 4, another large explosion occurred, which was in turn followed by growth of the current dome. There will likely be additional explosive events during the coming days to months, but their exact nature, as well as timing, remains uncertain. Because the dome sits at the lip of a steep slope leading out of the crater it can become unstable, and (as in 1990) collapse into the Drift River valley, producing avalanches of hot lava blocks, pyroclastic flows, lahars, and ash columns tens of thousands of feet tall, which can carry ash to Alaska communities. During periods between explosions, residents and pilots may also notice occasional sulfur smell and hazy conditions due to low-level ash and volcanic gas emissions.

== Disruption of oil production and state oil revenue ==
In late May 2009, it was reported that the continued shutdown of oil production in Cook Inlet due to the eruption of Mount Redoubt was costing the state of Alaska approximately US$1.5 million a month in tax revenue.
