= Drift River Terminal Facility =

Coordinates: 60°36′09″N 152°10′35″W

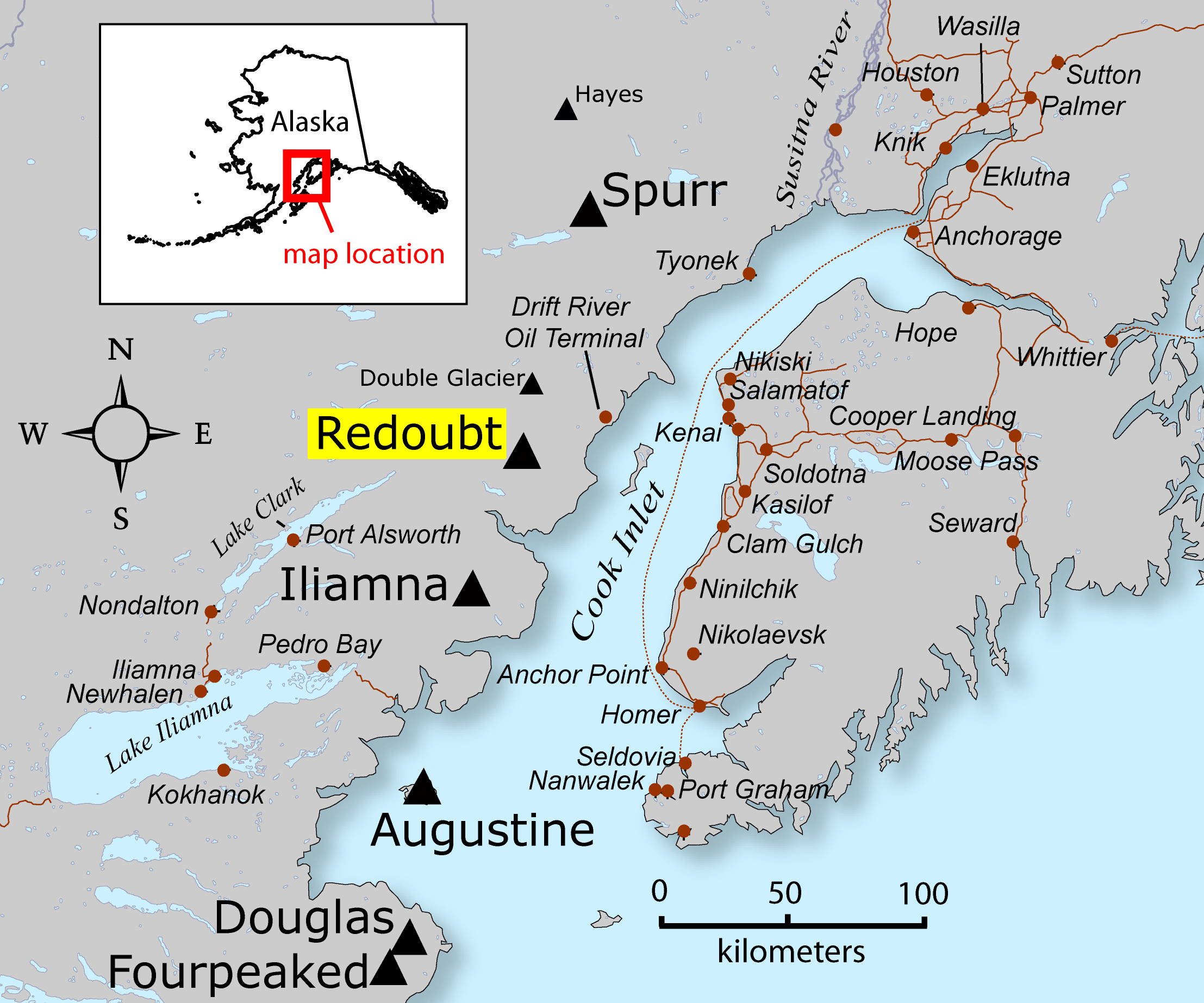
Location of the Drift River Terminal Facility

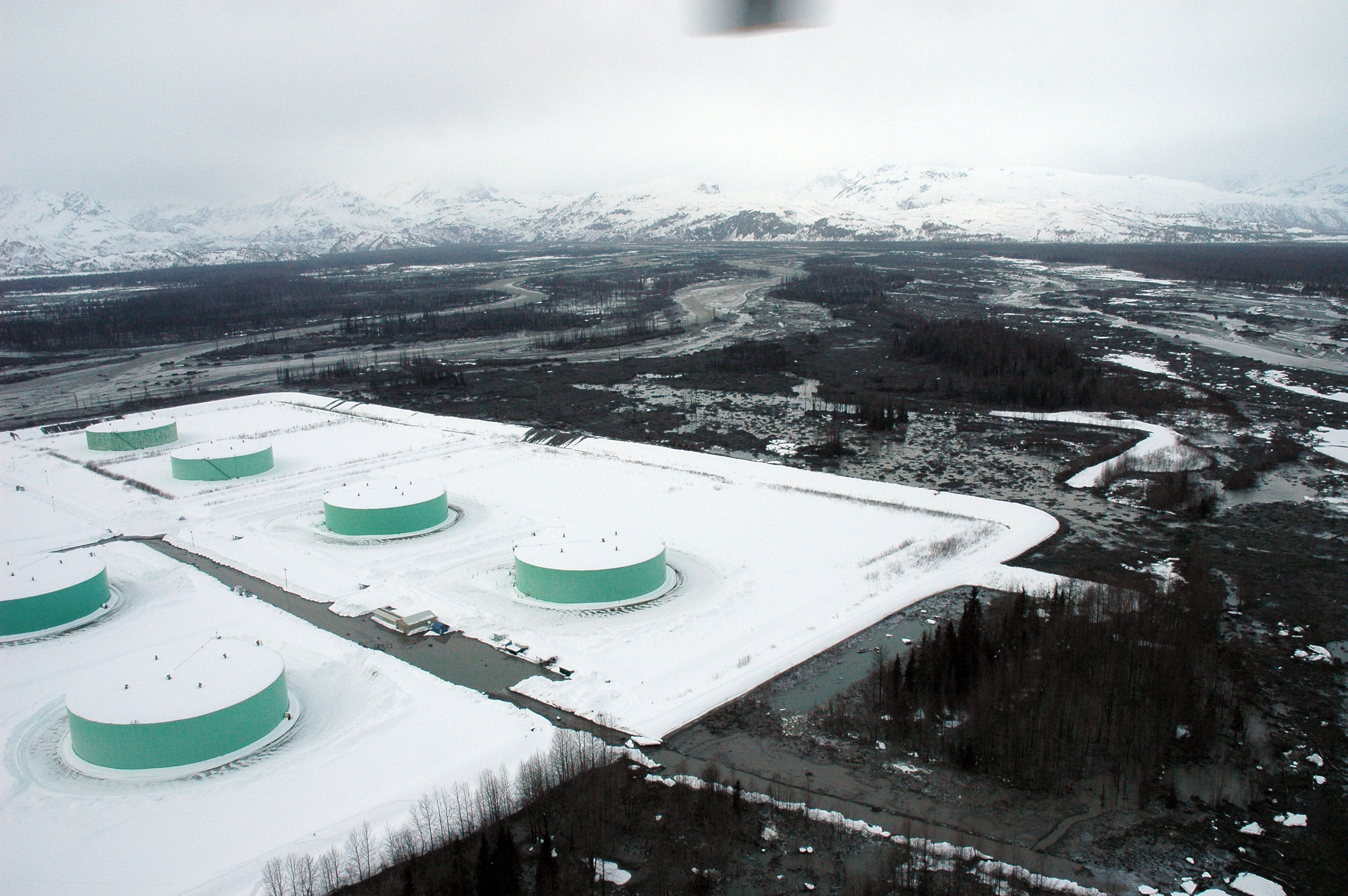
View west of the tank farm at DROT on March 23, 2009. Lahar deposits have ramped up to the top of the west dike and spilled over in a couple of locations. Water entered the compound along an existing roadway (foreground). The north dike (center) ends behind the grove of trees in the right midground. A seventh tank is not visible in the photo.

The Drift River Terminal Facility, also known as the Drift River Oil Terminal, is a tank farm which holds crude oil before it is loaded onto oil tankers and transported to refineries. It is located in Alaska along Cook Inlet, at the terminus of the Drift River, an historic floodplain of nearby volcanic Mount Redoubt. The facility is owned and operated by Cook Inlet Pipeline Company, a Houston-based corporation owned by Hilcorp. Oil is collected into the tanks via the submerged Cook Inlet Pipeline, which connects the tank farm to the oil fields on the west side of Cook Inlet. Oil tankers load crude from the tanks via a pump station located approximately one mile offshore, known as the Christy Lee Platform.

The tank farm's location has been controversial since the 1989/1990 eruption of Mount Redoubt, when the facility was flooded by lahars. Concerns were renewed during the 2009 eruptions of Redoubt. Dikes built after the 89/90 eruptions have kept the 2009 flooding away from the tanks, but an adjacent aircraft hangar and runway were damaged.

A major eruption of Redoubt on April 4, 2009 and subsequent flash floods damaged a generator facility and disrupted plans to remove the remaining crude oil from the facility and replace it with ballast water to stabilize the tanks and protect them from being dislodged during any future flooding. While the facility was again surrounded by lahars, the tank farm itself was not flooded and workers at the facility were not injured. The workers on site were evacuated to a "safe room" complete with food and sleeping quarters, as well as bathrooms and entertainment facilities to wait out the flooding.

On April 5, the Coast Guard determined that the tanks could not be refilled with ballast water after the oil was removed, as the water would then become a hazardous waste that the facility would not be able to dispose of properly. Instead, the oil will simply be removed and sent to refineries, with damage to the tanks from further flooding still possible. The Coast Guard will coordinate the oil removal with the Alaska Volcano Observatory and proceed when it is safe to do so.
