= Mount Redoubt =

Volcanic cone in Alaska, United States

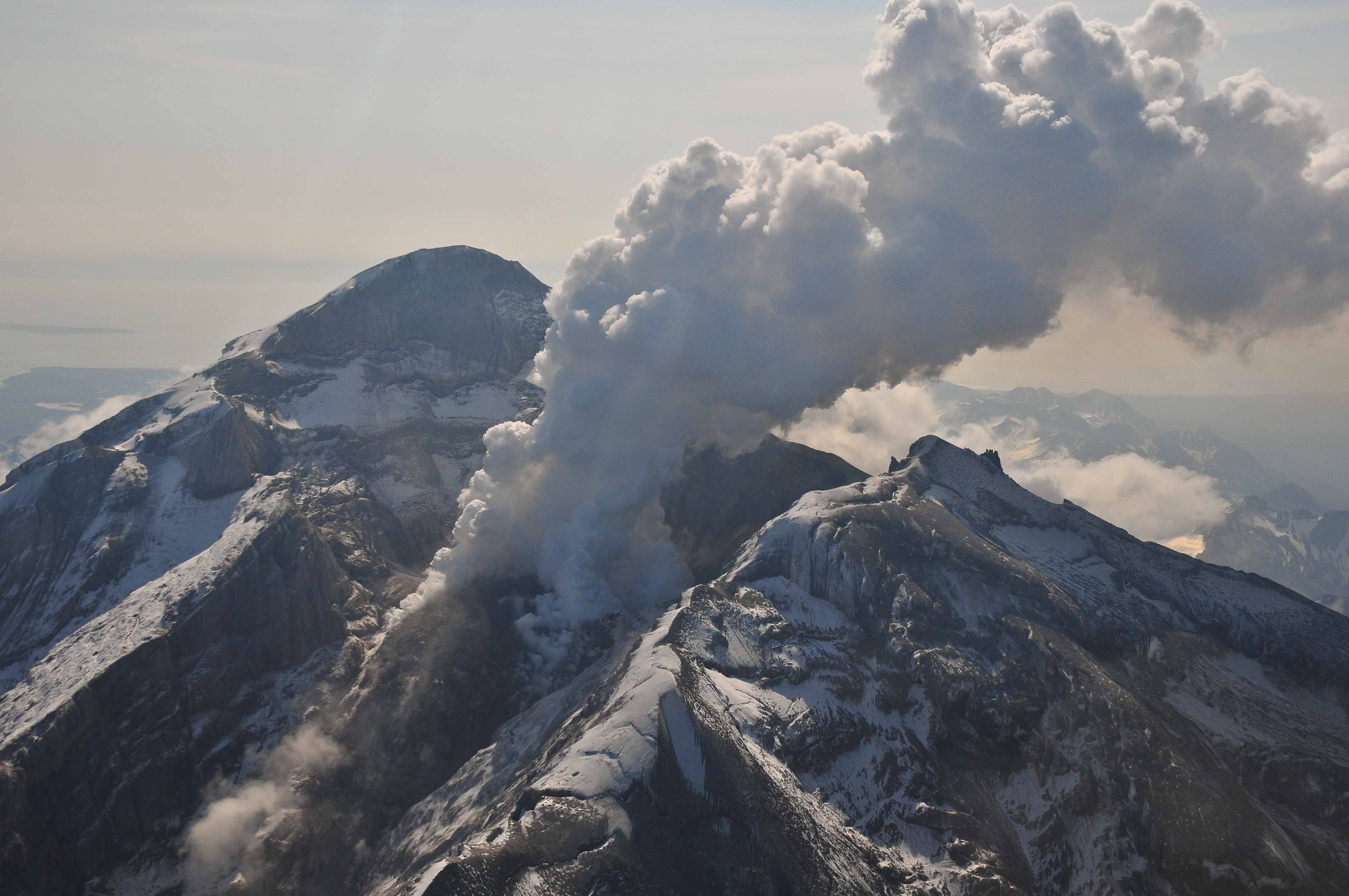
- Steaming at the active summit lava dome on May 8, 2009

Highest point
- Elevation: 10,197 ft (3,108 m)
- Prominence: 9,147 ft (2,788 m)
- Listing: North America prominent 22nd
- Coordinates: 60°29′06″N 152°44′31″W

Naming
- Native name: Bentuggezh K’enulgheli (Denaʼina)

Geography
- Location within Alaska
- Location: Lake Clark National Park and Preserve, Kenai Peninsula Borough, Alaska, United States
- Parent range: Chigmit Mountains, Aleutian Range

Geology
- Formed by: Subduction zone volcanism
- Rock age: 890,000 years
- Mountain type: Stratovolcano
- Volcanic arc: Aleutian Arc
- Last eruption: March to July 2009

Climbing
- First ascent: 1959 by C Deehr, J Gardey, F Kennell, G Wescott
- Easiest route: snow/ice climb

U.S. National Natural Landmark
- Designated: 1976

Redoubt Volcano, or Mount Redoubt (Dena'ina: Bentuggezh K’enulgheli), is an active stratovolcano in the largely volcanic Aleutian Range of the U.S. state of Alaska. Located at the head of the Chigmit Mountains subrange in Lake Clark National Park and Preserve, the mountain is just west of Cook Inlet, in the Kenai Peninsula Borough about 110 miles (180 km) southwest of Anchorage. At 10,197 feet (3,108 m), in just over 5 miles (8.0 km) Mount Redoubt attains 9,150 feet (2,790 m) of prominence over its surrounding terrain. It is the highest summit in the Aleutian Range. In 1976, Redoubt Volcano was designated as a National Natural Landmark by the National Park Service.

Active for millennia, Mount Redoubt has erupted four times since it was first observed: in 1902, 1966, 1989 and 2009, with two questionable eruptions in 1881 and 1933. The eruption in 1989 spewed volcanic ash to a height of 45,000 ft (13,700 m). It caught KLM Flight 867, a Boeing 747 aircraft, in its plume. After the plane descended 13,000 feet, the pilots restarted the engines and landed the plane safely at Anchorage. The ash blanketed an area of about 7,700 mi^{2} (20,000 km^{2}). The 1989 eruption is also notable for being the first ever volcanic eruption to be successfully predicted by the method of long-period seismic events developed by Swiss/American volcanologist Bernard Chouet. As of 2018, the US Geological Survey rated Mount Redoubt a "very high threat" to people and infrastructure.

== Name ==
The official name of the mountain is Redoubt Volcano, a translation of the Russian name "Sopka Redutskaya", referring to, as does the word "redoubt", "a fortified place". A local name, "Ujakushatsch", also means "fortified place", but it is difficult to determine if one name is derived from the other. The Board on Geographic Names decided on the name "Redoubt Volcano" in 1891.

The Global Volcanism Program of the Smithsonian Institution refers to the mountain simply as "Redoubt", and lists these alternate names: Burnt Mountain, Goreloi, Mirando, Ujakushatsch, Viesokaia, and Yjakushatsch. The Alaska Volcano Observatory also uses simply "Redoubt"; it lists the same alternate names in addition to: Goryalaya, Redoute Mtn., and Redutskaya, Sopka.

== Human history ==
The first human inhabitants in the area around Mount Redoubt arrived 14,000 years ago, after the end of the last ice age. While limited data exists, archaeologists found tools at high elevations in the area. The tools were thought to be used by nomadic hunters.

The Denaʼina people settled in the area before the Little Ice Age began in 1350 AD. The Denaʼina may have first settled along the coast and were pushed to inland by Russian settlement, although exact details are unknown. By 1909, measles and flu epidemics caused the Denaʼina to abandon their town near Lake Clark, approximately 50 miles east of Mount Redoubt.

== Geology ==
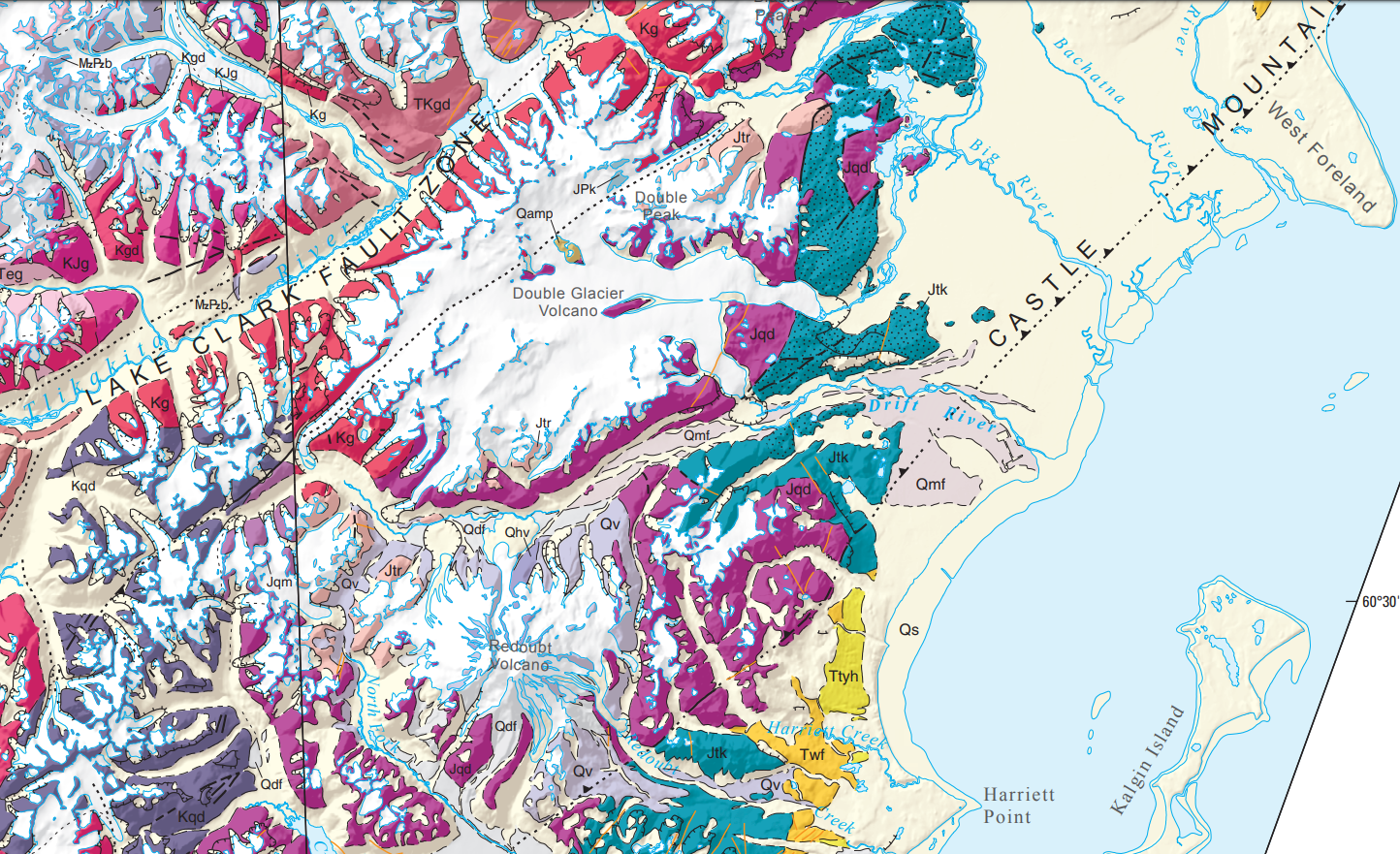
Redoubt Volcano geological map

The volcano is about 3.7 miles (6.0 km) in diameter at its base with a rough volume of 7.2 to 8.4 mi^{3} (30–35 km^{3}). The sides of the upper cone are relatively steep (in comparison to volcanoes in general). Made up of pyroclastic flow deposits and lava flows, and resting on Mesozoic era rocks of the Aleutian Mountain Range batholith, the mountain has been somewhat weathered by movement of several glaciers that reside on it. The current main vent is on the north side of the crater by the head of the Drift glacier. Also present on the mountain are Holocene lahar deposits that extend as far as the Cook Inlet. This mountain has produced andesite, basalt and dacite, with relatively silicic andesite dominant in recent eruptions.

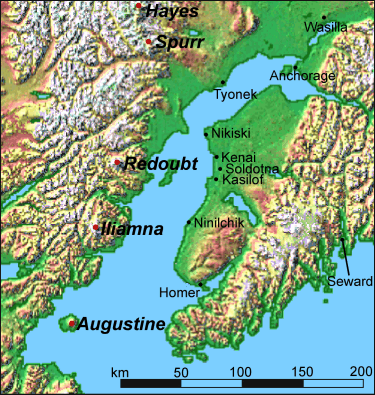
Locations of volcanoes near Cook Inlet

The earliest eruptions of the volcano were approximately 888,000 years ago. The current volcanic cone started to build 340,000 years ago.

== Eruptions ==
=== Early reports ===
Captain James Cook saw Mt. Redoubt during the summer of 1778, describing it as "emitting a white smoke but no fire which made some think it was no more than a white thick cloud such as we have frequently seen on the Coast, for the most part appearing on the sides of hills and often extends along a whole range and at different times falls or rises, expands or contracts itself and has a resemblance to Clouds of white smoke. But this besides being too small for one of those clouds, remained as it were fixed in the same spot for the whole time the Mountain was clear which was above 48 hours." However, several sources call this a "discredited eruption".

In 1819, smoke was observed at the mountain. However, this is often not recorded as an eruption as the information was insufficient to identify it as such. Similarly, in 2003, a blowing cloud of snow was mistaken by an employee of the ConocoPhillips Building in Anchorage for an ash plume. Possible steam-vapor let off was observed in 1933 at the mountain.

=== 1881 ===
There was apparently an eruption described as "to the eastward, Redoubt Volcano, 11,060 feet (3,370 m) high, is constantly smoking, with periods of exaggerated activity. Fire has been seen issuing from its summit far out at sea. A great eruption took place in 1881, when a party of native hunters half-way up its slopes were overwhelmed by a lava-flow and only two escaped." However, this eruption is not well documented by other sources.

=== 1902 ===
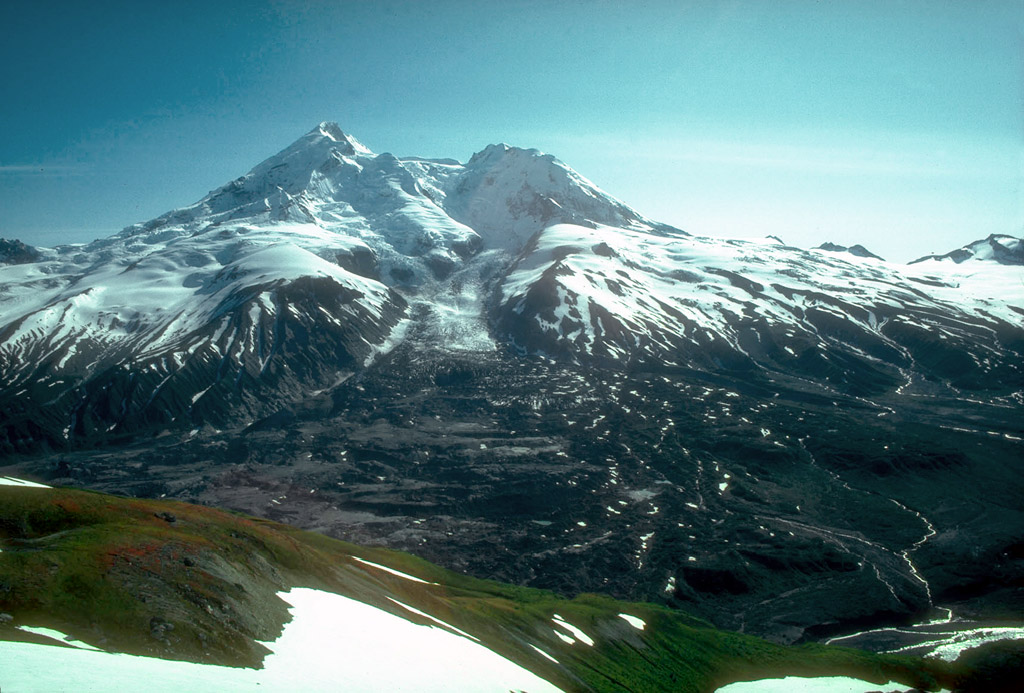
North face in 1980

The volcano erupted rather abruptly in 1902, spewing out ash from January 18 to June 21 in the year. A local newspaper stated, "Word has just been received that Redoubt, one of the volcanoes at Cook's Inlet had an eruption on January 18, and the country for 150 miles (240 km) around was covered with ashes and lava. The news comes from Sunrise, but nothing definite has been ascertained as to whether any damage was done, for no boats have as yet been in the neighborhood of the volcano." There were many other news reports on the eruption, one describing the eruption as "a terrific earthquake which burst the mountain asunder leaving a large gap," which could possibly suggest the crack formation in the volcano's crater, however, it is unlikely. Supposedly, the volcano was ejecting "flames" from its crater, and the eruption terrified natives in the area. Newspapers seemed to suggest that the ash had traveled for more than 150 miles (240 km), reaching the opposite side of the Cook Inlet.

=== 1989–1990 ===
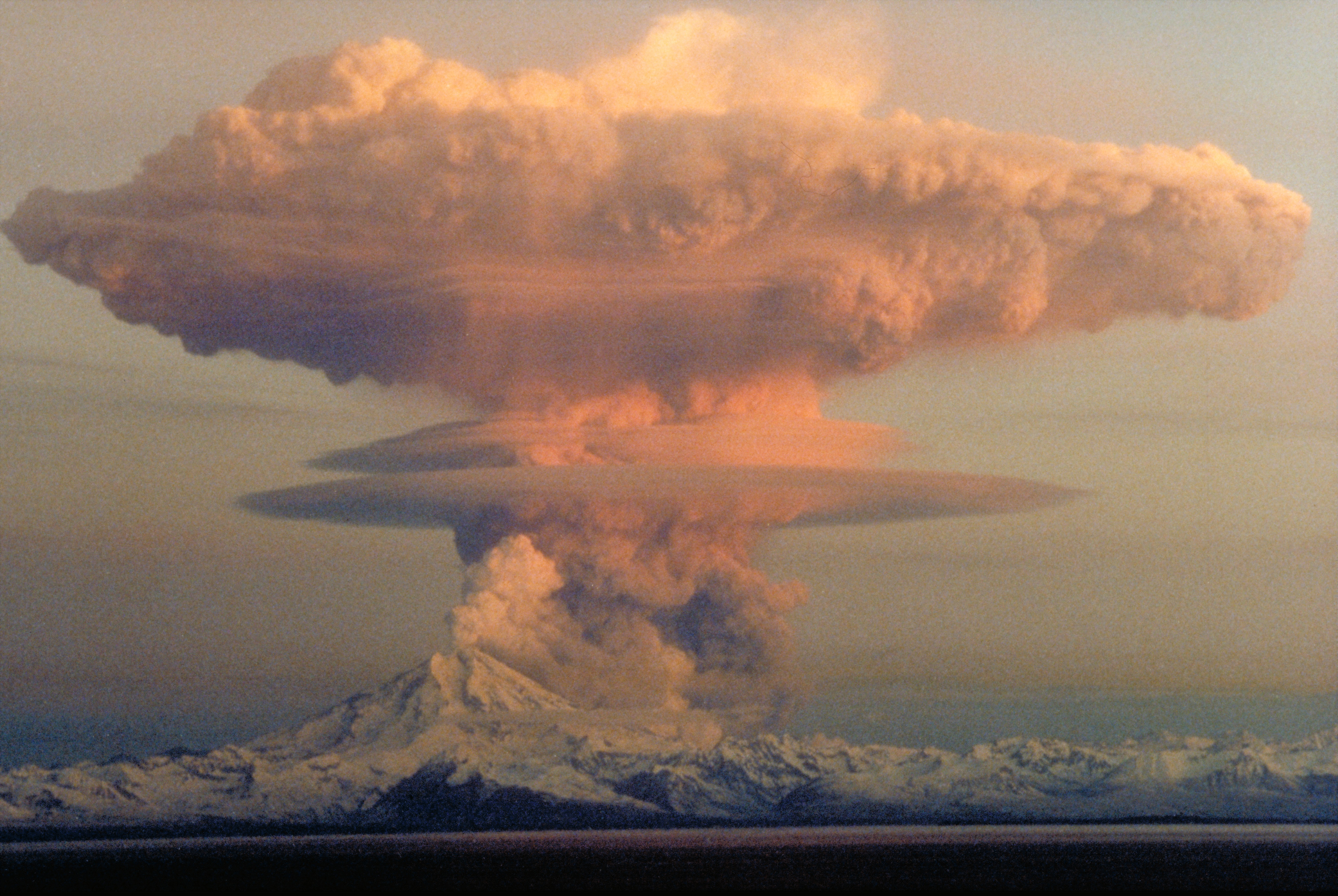
April 21, 1990 eruption column (to a height of about 5.6 mi (9 km)) from Redoubt Volcano as viewed to the west from the Kenai Peninsula

The volcano erupted on December 14, 1989, and continued to erupt for over six months. Sudden melting of snow and ice at the summit caused by pyroclastic flows and dome collapses caused lahars, or mudflows, which flowed down the north flank of the mountain. A majority of the mudflows coursed to Cook Inlet, about 22 miles (35 km) from the volcano. The lahars entered a nearby river, worrying officials that they might destroy an oil storage facility located along it.

Since lahars were produced repeatedly, scientists realized that they could use these to analyze a trial period for a newly developed device proposed to measure the movement of rocks against each other. This device, now known as an Acoustic Flow Monitor, alerts nearby stations to possible lahars.

The eruption also caused an airliner to have all four engines fail after a Boeing 747-400 jumbo jet operated by KLM Royal Dutch Airlines flew into a cloud of volcanic ash. Damage from the eruption was estimated at $160 million, the second costliest volcanic eruption in United States history.

=== 2009 ===
==== Pre-eruption ====
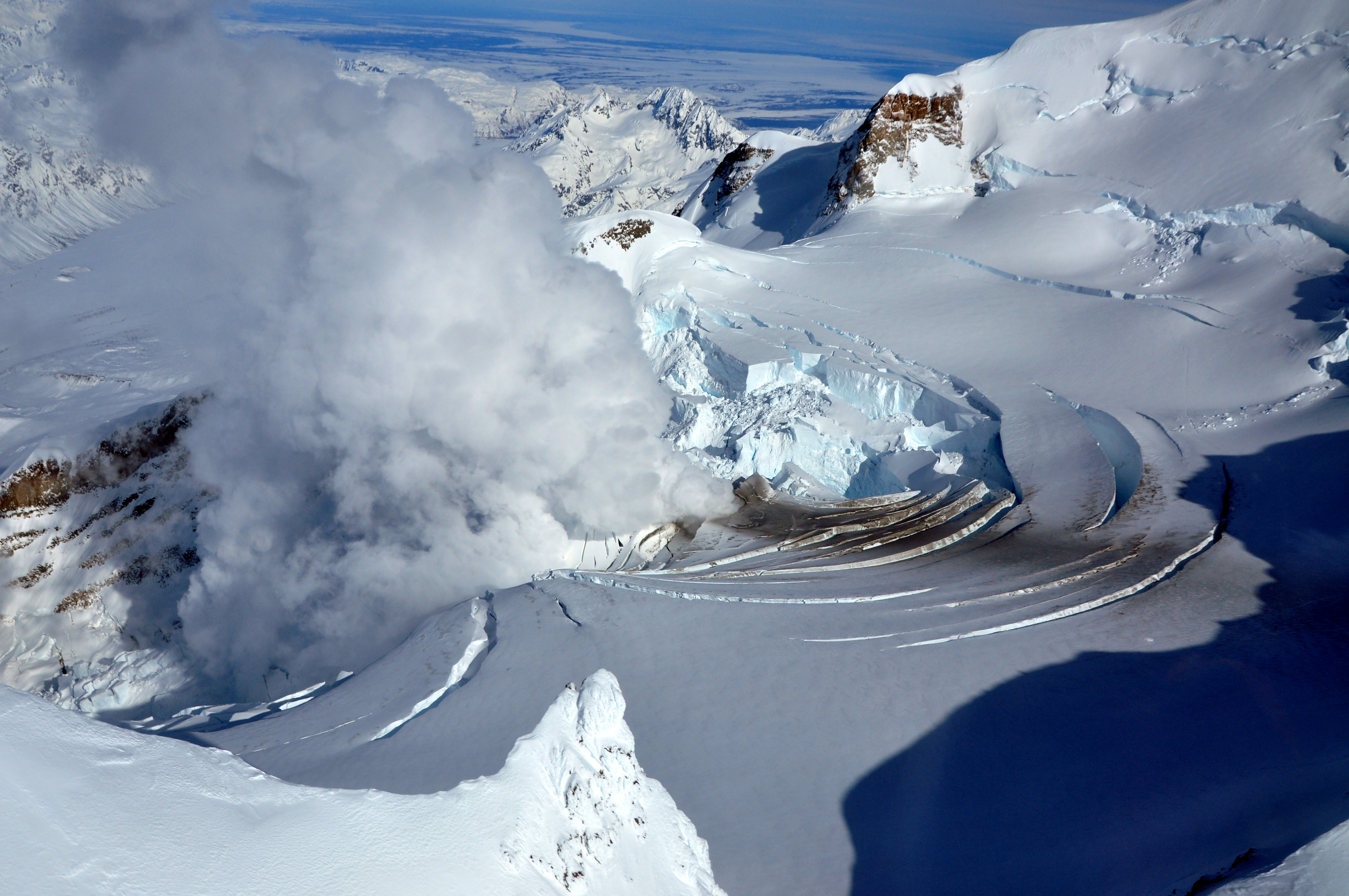
Fumarole on March 21, 2009, the day before the eruption

Anomalous gas emissions were noticed on the volcano starting in July 2008, with a noticeable smell of hydrogen sulfide. Precursor earthquakes started on September 28, 2008. By January 31, earthquakes increased to several per hour, and a large hole in the glacier on the side of the mountain was spotted. Scientists began to monitor seismic data from the mountain twenty-four hours a day in an effort to warn people in nearby communities. A fly over conducted by the AVO detected "significant steaming from a new melt depression at the mouth of the summit crater near the vent area of the 1989-90 eruption."

Throughout February, seismic tremors, excess gas, and new fumaroles were observed at the volcano. Surface rock temperatures were measured as high as 28 °C (82 °F). On March 15, a gas measurement flight observed a small explosion followed by a steam plume.

In a 2021 study, the surface of the volcano warmed by 0.47 °C (0.85 °F) from 2006 to 2009, as detected by infrared satellite sensing. Detecting such warming could be an effective method for predicting volcanic eruptions.

==== Large scale eruptions begin ====
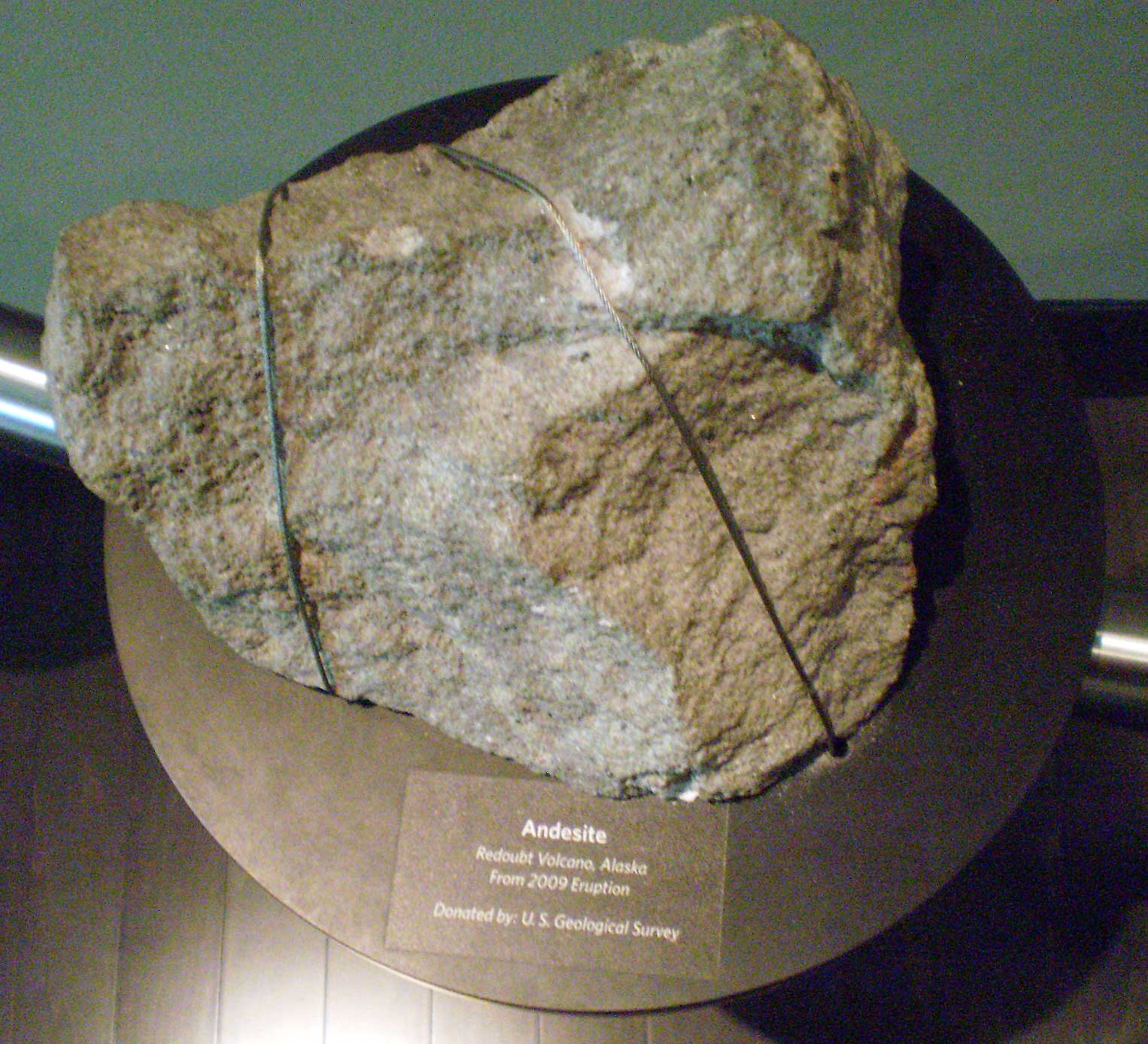
A chunk of andesite thrown from the volcano in 2009 is seen on display at the Anchorage Museum in March 2011.

Mount Redoubt erupted explosively late in the evening of March 22, 2009. AVO recorded numerous volcanic eruptions and/or explosions at Redoubt volcano from March 22 through April 4. During the eruptions, reports found ash clouds reaching as high as 65,000 feet (20,000 m) above sea level. The Mat-Su Valley, Anchorage, Valdez and large portions of the Kenai Peninsula all received coatings of tephra. Ash from the eruption shut down the Anchorage airport for 20 hours on March 28. 1.5-meter (5 ft)-deep lahars reached the Drift River Oil Terminal twice, which required removal of 140,000 barrels of crude oil. The 2009 eruptions of Mount Redoubt represented the most seismic activity occurring on the mountain in twenty years.

A lava dome started to grow after an explosion on April 4, 2009. The lava dome ceased to grow by July 2009.

=== After 2009 ===
The mountain has been largely quiescent since 2009, except for two notable events. On June 29, 2015, a glacial lake outburst flood occurred from a reservoir in the volcano's main crater. The flood was caused by an avalanche of snow mixed with 2009 eruption material.

On August 16, 2019, strong winds carried previously erupted ash. The aviation alert level was not changed due to this re-suspended ash.

== Climate ==
The climate of a location on any mountain in strongly dependent on its elevation and microclimate. The summit of Mount Redoubt has an ice cap climate under the Köppen climate classification, the slopes have a tundra climate, while the valleys and coastal areas have a subarctic climate. The weather along the coast of the Cook Inlet is often foggy and wet, with total annual precipitation around 40 to 80 in (1,000 to 2,000 mm).

== See also ==
- List of mountain peaks of North America
  - List of mountain peaks of the United States
    - List of mountain peaks of Alaska
- List of Ultras of the United States
- List of volcanoes in the United States

== External links and resources ==
- Alaska Volcano Observatory (to follow 2009 volcanic activity by geologists reports)
- Live updates from the AVO Twitter page
  - Webcams:
    - Redoubt Volcano Webcam, USGS (intermittently available). View of north flank of Redoubt from AVO's Redoubt Hut, approximately 7.5 mi (12.1 km) from Redoubt's summit crater.
    - Redoubt-CI webcam, Chevron via Alaska Volcano Observatory. View of northeast face from Oil Platform Anna in Gompertz Channel of Cook Inlet at 60°58′36″N 151°18′54″W, approximately 100 km (62 mi) NE of mountain.
    - Daily Time-lapse animation of the Mount Redoubt Hut Web Cam
  - Mount Redoubt Seismic Webicorders (near-real time seismic record from station near peak)
- Satellite imagery of the 23, 24, and 26 March 2009 eruptions (CIMSS Satellite Blog)
- Time lapse video and photos of the March 27, 2009, eruption, taken from Ninilchik
- BBC page with footage and links to other pages on the volcano
- Large-format photo essay of the Mount Redoubt eruption from "The Big Picture" blog on Boston.com.
