= Harmonic tremor =

Ground vibration associated with volcanic activity

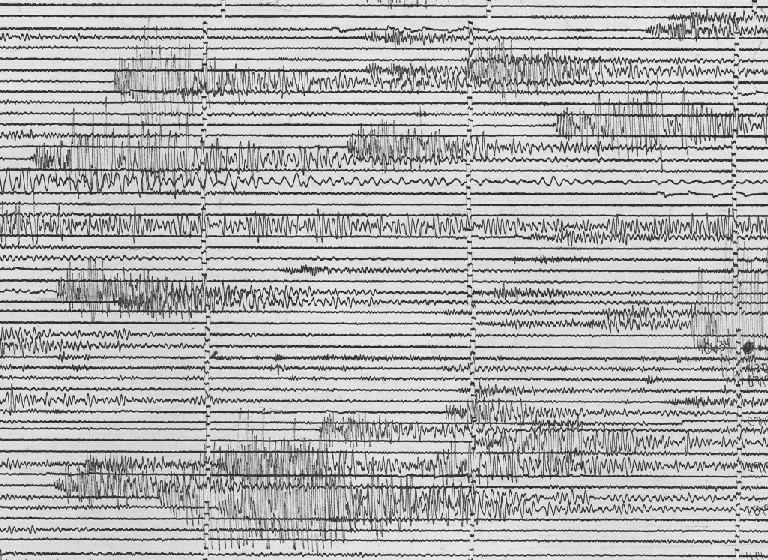
Seismograph recording of harmonic tremor

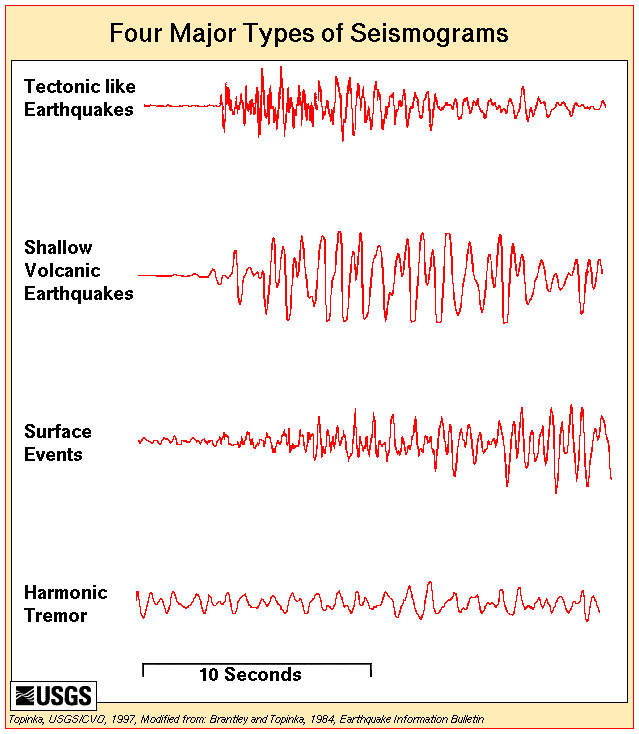
Four major types of seismograms, or seismic signatures

A harmonic tremor is a sustained release of seismic and infrasonic energy typically associated with the underground movement of magma, the venting of volcanic gases from magma, or both in volcanoes, and with repetitive stick-slip or other impulsive activity in non-volcanic systems. It is a long-duration release of seismic energy, often containing distinct spectral lines. Volcanic tremor often precedes or accompanies a volcanic eruption. Being a long-duration continuous signal from a temporally extended source tremor contrasts distinctly with transient and often impulsive sources of seismic radiation typically associated with earthquakes and explosions.

Nonvolcanic, episodic tremor at plate boundaries (particularly in subduction zones) has been attributed to swarms of long-period earthquakes and is distinguished by the term episodic tremor and slip (ETS) and may occur during slow earthquakes.

Iceberg impacts with the seafloor or other icebergs can also generate distinct iceberg harmonic tremor signals that propagate to large distances as ocean acoustic and solid Earth seismic wavefields. The source process of iceberg harmonic tremor has been attributed to highly repetitive quasi-periodic stick-slip at ice-seafloor or ice-ice contacts.

The relation between long-period events and an imminent eruption was first observed by Bernard Chouet, a volcanologist who was working at the United States Geological Survey.

== See also ==
- Volcano tectonic earthquake
