= Bernard Chouet =

Bernard A. Chouet (born 14 October 1945) is a geophysicist who specializes in volcanic seismology. He discovered that volcanic eruptions could be predicted by observing the frequency of certain seismic waves that are generated by volcanoes.

== Background ==
Bernard Chouet was born on 14 October 1945 in Nyon, Switzerland. In 1968 he received a diploma in electrical engineering from the Federal Institute of Technology in Lausanne, Switzerland. After graduation, he worked briefly at a Swiss robotics laboratory. Seeking an opportunity to do research in robotics, he subsequently worked at the Massachusetts Institute of Technology (MIT); specifically, at the Man-Vehicle Laboratory in the Center for Space Research, which was doing research for NASA’s Apollo program to land men on the Moon. However, when NASA’s budget was reduced, he was free to pursue other interests. As a teenager, he had become interested in volcanoes. So, after completing a master of science degree in aeronautics and astronautics at MIT in 1972, he pursued studies in geophysics. His ambition was to use seismology to predict the behavior of volcanoes. In 1973 he received a master of science degree in earth and planetary sciences from MIT, and in 1976 he received a Ph.D. in geophysics from MIT. From 1976 to 1983 he worked as a research associate in MIT’s Department of Earth and Planetary Sciences. Since 1983 he has worked for the U.S. Geological Survey in Menlo Park, California—first in its Office of Earthquakes, Volcanoes, and Engineering, and then as a member of its Volcano Hazards Team. Bernard Chouet is married to Paula Dickson; the couple have one son.

== Prediction of volcanic eruptions ==
Since 1977, Chouet’s colleague Keiiti Aki had been developing mathematical models of magma-filled fractures in volcanoes, in order to determine what seismic waves would be produced by such fractures. Since 1985 Chouet himself had also been developing models of such fractures. The turning point in Chouet’s research occurred in 1986, when Chouet examined the seismic records of the 1985 eruption of the Nevado del Ruiz volcano in Colombia. In the seismic records, he found that so-called “B-type events” or “long-period events” had occurred with increasing frequency prior to the eruption. (“Long-period events” are the records of seismic waves that are produced by volcanic fluids surging through fissures in a volcano—a phenomenon similar to water hammer.) Chouet then used the occurrence of long-period events to predict the 1989 and 1990 eruptions of Mount Redoubt in Alaska and the 1993 eruption of Galeras in Colombia. In 2000, Mexican officials used Chouet's methods to predict the eruption of Popocatépetl in Mexico.
