= Galeras =

Volcanic mountain in Colombia

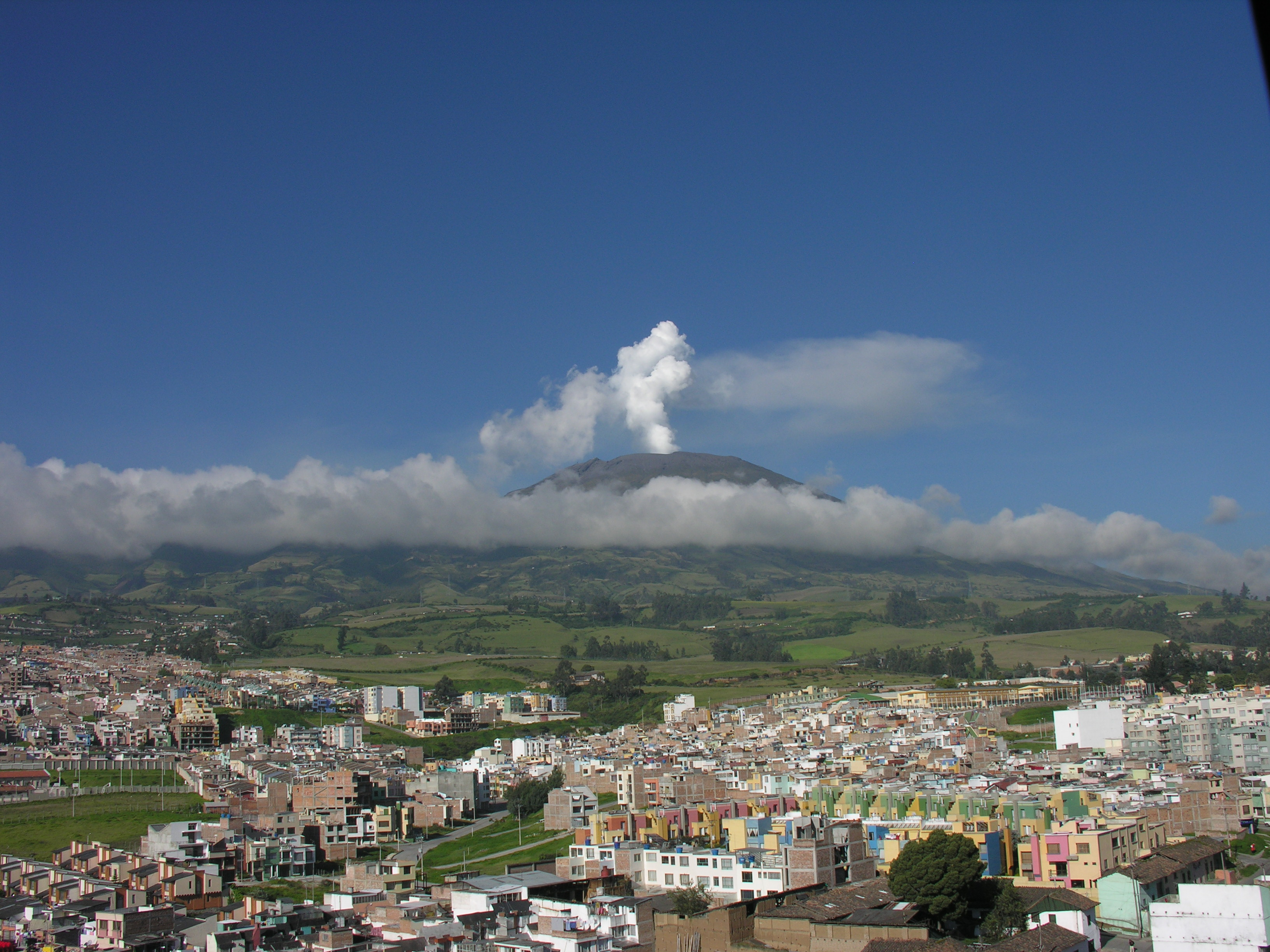
- Galeras in December 2005

Highest point
- Elevation: 4,276 m (14,029 ft)
- Prominence: 1,116 m (3,661 ft)
- Coordinates: 1°13′16″N 77°21′33″W

Geography
- Location within Colombia
- Location: Nariño, Colombia
- Parent range: Central Ranges; Andes

Geology
- Mountain type: Complex volcano
- Volcanic zone: North Volcanic Zone
- Last eruption: 2012 to 2014

Galeras (Urcunina among the 16th-century indigenous people) is an active stratovolcano in the Colombian department of Nariño, near the departmental capital Pasto. Its summit rises 4,276 metres (14,029 ft) above sea level. It has erupted frequently since the Spanish conquest, with its first historical eruption being recorded on December 7, 1580. A 1993 eruption killed nine people, including six scientists who had descended into the volcano's crater to sample gases and take gravity measurements in an attempt to be able to predict future eruptions. It is currently the most active volcano in Colombia.

== Geological history ==
Major volcanoes in Colombia

Galeras has been an active volcano for at least a million years, with andesite as the dominant product. Two major caldera-forming eruptions have occurred, the first about 560,000 years ago in an eruption which expelled about 15 cubic kilometres (3.6 cu mi) of material. The second some time between 40,000 and 150,000 years ago, in a smaller but still sizable eruption of 2 cubic kilometres (0.48 cu mi) of material. Subsequently, part of the caldera wall has collapsed, possibly due to instabilities caused by hydrothermal activity, and later eruptions have built up a smaller cone inside the now horseshoe-shaped caldera.

In light of its violent eruptive history and proximity to the 450,000 people of Pasto, Galeras was designated a Decade Volcano in 1991, identifying it as a target for detailed study as part of the United Nations' International Decade for Natural Disaster Reduction.

== Eruptive history ==
Galeras is considered the most active volcano in Colombia, followed by Nevado del Ruiz. Its earliest activity during the Holocene has been dated at 7050 BC ± 1000 years through radiocarbon dating. Other eruptions similar to this event include those in 3150 BC ± 200 years, 2580 BC ± 500 years, 1160 BC ± 300 years, 490 BC ± 100 years, and in 890 AD ± 200 years. Typically these eruptions consist of a central vent explosion, conducive to an explosive eruption causing pyroclastic flows and/or lahars. Eruptions in more recent times, which have been recorded consist of those in 1535, December 1580, July 1616, 1641, 1670, 1754, November 1796, June 1823, October 1828, 1834, October 1865, July 1889, 1891, December 1923, October 1924, October 1932, February 1936, July 1947, January 1950, 1974, February 1989, January 1990, January 1993, March 2000, June 2002, July 2004, November 2005, October 2007, January 2008, February 2009, March 2009, January 2010, and August 2010. Reported incidents with no official proof occurred in 1836, 1930, 1933, and 1973.

=== 1993 eruption ===
Galeras became active again in 1988 after 10 years of dormancy.

A Decade Volcano conference in the city of Pasto, in 1993, ended in disaster when several of the scientists present mounted an impromptu expedition on 14 January to the crater of Galeras. An eruption occurred unexpectedly while they were at the summit, resulting in the deaths of six scientists and three tourists.

Elements in the media made the event controversial by suggesting the expedition leader, geologist Stanley Williams, who survived along with four others, had ignored safety procedures. A prediction had been made three days before the eruption based on B-Type activity seen on a seismograph. Seismic B-types had been used successfully to predict eruptions on other volcanoes. However, the prediction was based simply on the one seismographic printout viewed in the light of previous history of Galeras, without any additional scientific measurements showing any serious activity within the volcano.

== 21st-century activity ==
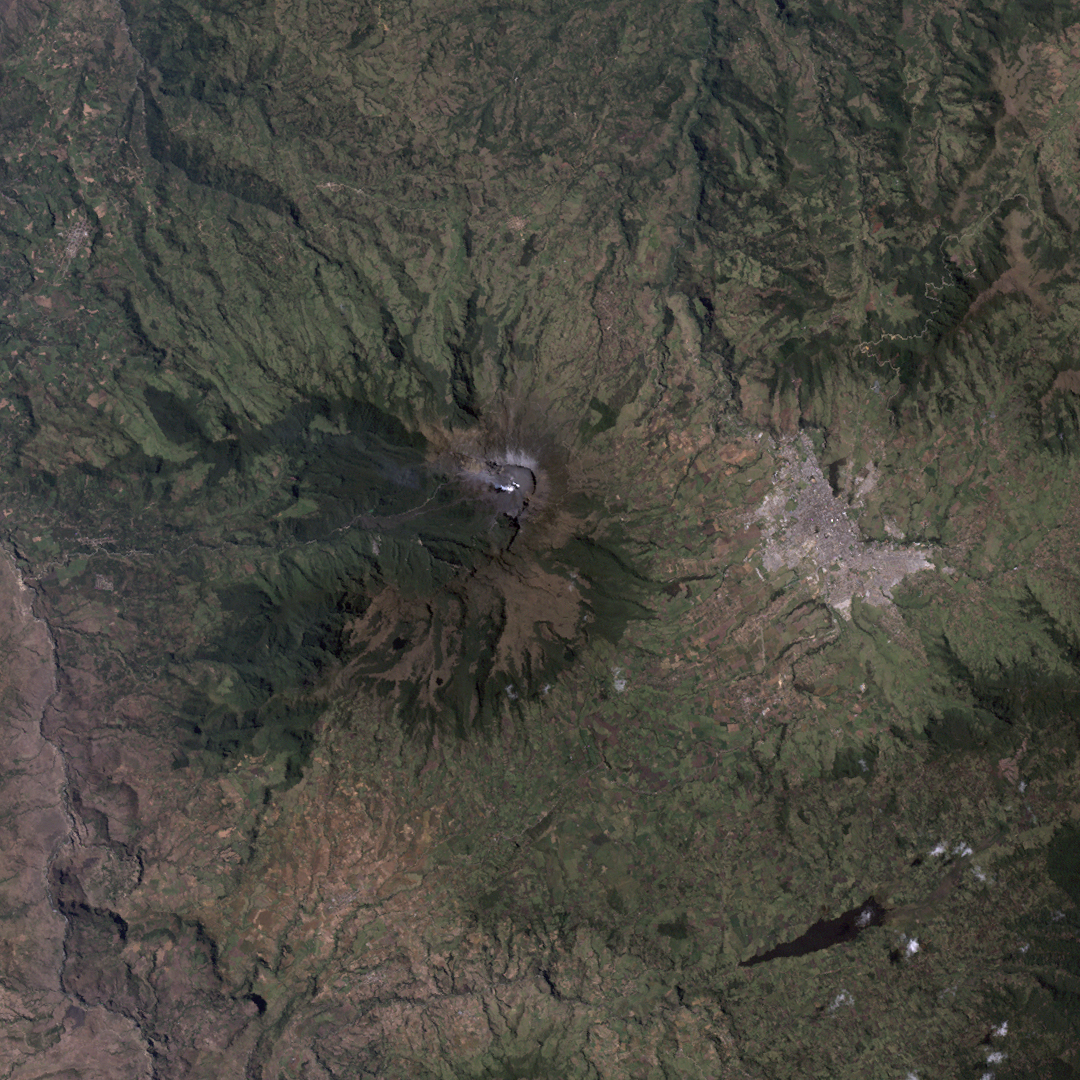
The Galeras Volcano, aerial image by NASA showing its activity. City of Pasto on the right.

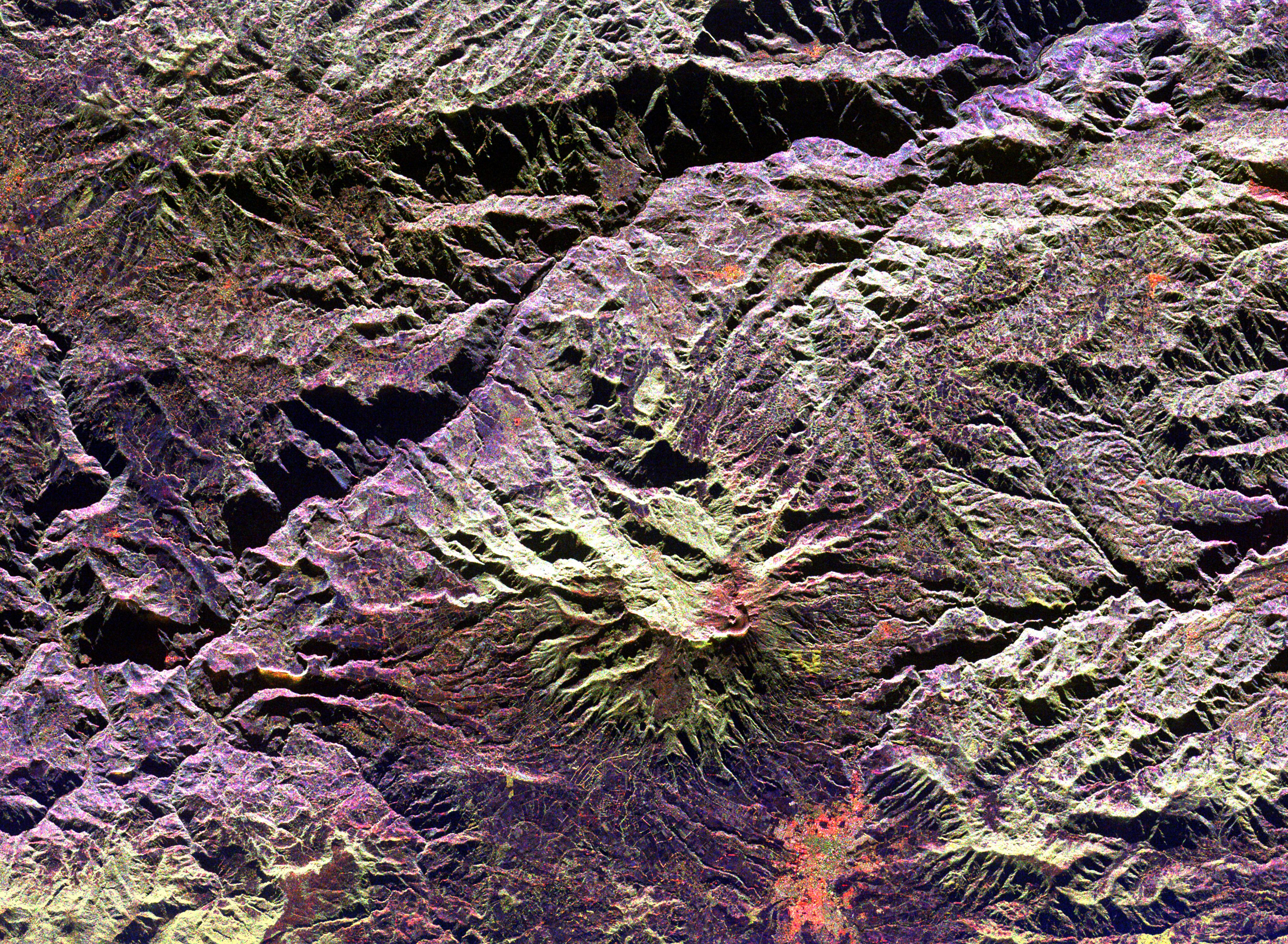
Space radar image of Galeras Volcano. City of Pasto at bottom

Activity at a low level has continued at Galeras, with small explosions occasionally dusting nearby villages and towns with ash. The volcano has continued to be well-studied, and predictions of eruptions at the volcano have improved. One phenomenon, which seems to be a reliable precursor to eruptive activity, is a low-frequency seismic event known as a tornillo event. These have occurred before about four-fifths of the explosions at Galeras, and the number of tornillo events recorded before an eruption is also correlated with the size of the ensuing eruption.

More than 100 minor tremors were felt during a major eruption in April 2002, although no damage or injury was reported. An eruption in November 2005 forced an evacuation of the dangerous area surrounding the volcano, and about 9,400 people from nearby villages (most of them farmers) were ordered to leave. The city of Pasto, about 9 kilometres (5.6 mi) from the volcano, was blanketed by a layer of ash after the volcanic explosion, forcing the residents to don goggles and face masks.

Numerous minor tremors and ash emissions since March 2006 culminated on 12 July 2006 in three explosive eruptions, producing an ash and gas column reaching an altitude of 8 kilometres (5.0 mi). Rock falls and pyroclastic flows were reported from towns as distant as Consacá, 11.4 kilometres (7.1 mi) west of the main crater. The Colombian government has repeatedly ordered evacuations to temporary shelters, of more than 8500 people residing in the highest risk areas surrounding the volcano, with hopes of eventual assistance toward permanent relocation.

On January 17, 2008, the volcano erupted around 20:06 (local) (01:06 UTC). There were no immediate reports of injuries or serious property damage. Later the experts confirmed partial damage in the national and local TV towers.

Then, on February 14, 2009, the volcano erupted around 19:10 (local) (00:10 UTC). Some 8,000 residents were evacuated, and there were no immediate reports of injuries or serious property damage. As in 2005, the city of Pasto was blanketed by a layer of ash after the volcanic explosion (due to the direction of the wind). The local authorities ordered two water treatment plants near Galeras to shut down.

On March 13, 2009, Galeras erupted twice at around 15:55 and 17:00 (local time). Ash fell on Pasto and some other towns near the volcano, where an evacuation was ordered but reportedly ignored. No injuries or damage were reported.

=== 2010 eruption ===
The volcano erupted on January 3, 2010, forcing the evacuation of 8,000 people. This was the 10th such eruption of the volcano in the preceding 12 months, and the first of 2010. Colombian authorities also stated that it could remain volatile in the weeks to come.

Galeras erupted again on August 25, 2010 with an ash plume visible in the air. The eruption, which was described as non-explosive, caused authorities to raise an alert for neighbouring towns.

This volcano is monitored by the Deep Earth Carbon Degassing Project.

== Gallery ==
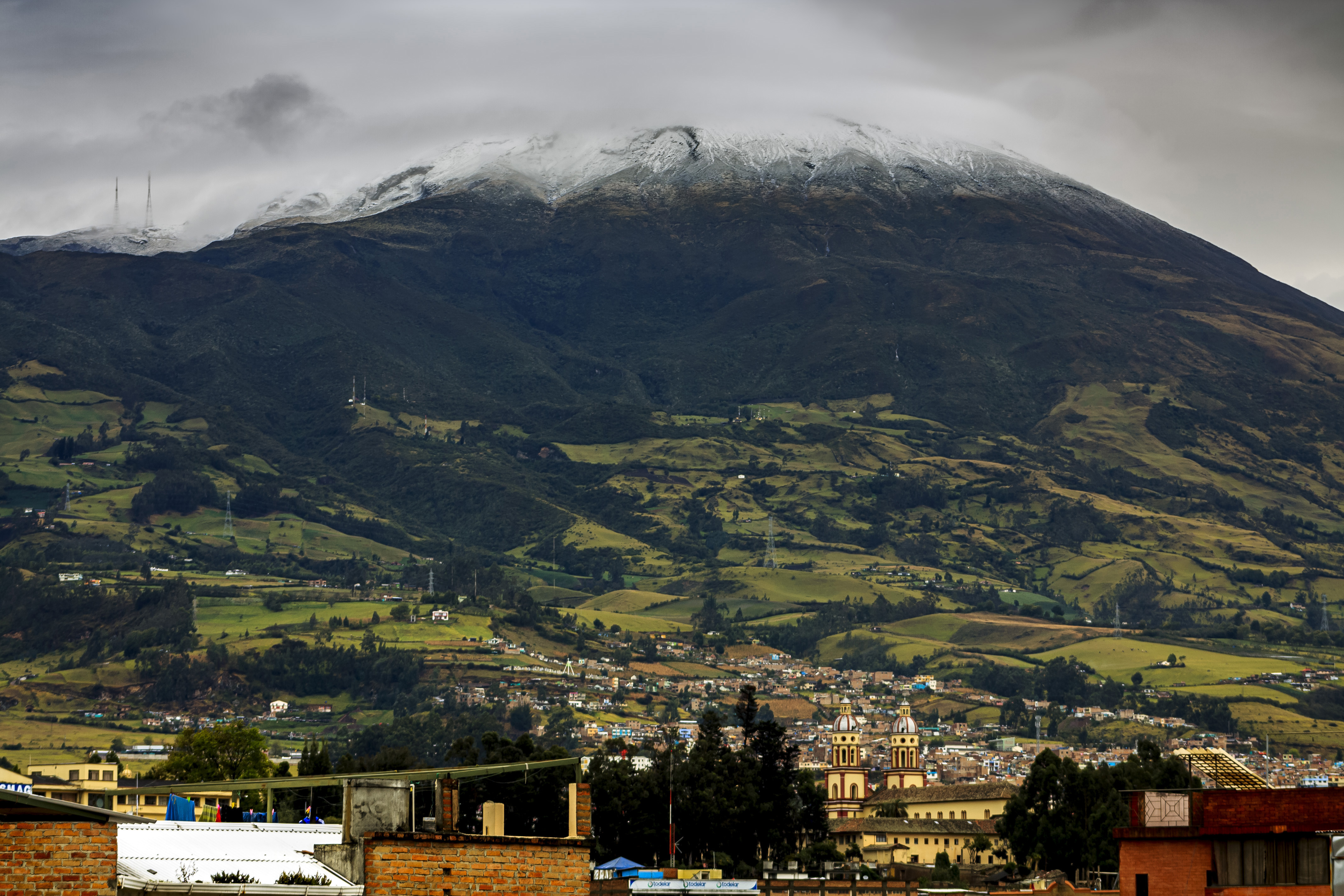
Galeras Volcano shrouded in cloud and rare snow, overlooking the city of Pasto

== See also ==
- List of volcanoes in Colombia
- List of volcanoes by elevation
- List of mountains in Colombia
