= United States Geological Survey National Volcanic Threat Assessment =

United States Geological Survey report

The United States Geological Survey National Volcanic Threat Assessment is a report containing a ranked list of active volcanoes in the United States posing hazardous risks to the American population. The report was published by the United States Geological Survey in 2005 and revised in 2018.

== 2018 list ==
The 2018 ranked list of hazardous volcanoes in the United States below is based on a 24-factor scoring matrix used to calculate overall threat scores and aviation threat scores.

Rank	Volcano	State	Overall threat score	Aviation threat score	Coordinates
1	Kīlauea	Hawaii	263	48	19.425°N 155.292°W
2	Mount St. Helens	Washington	235	59	46.2°N 122.18°W
3	Mount Rainier	Washington	203	37	46.87°N 121.758°W
4	Redoubt Volcano	Alaska	201	48	60.485°N 152.742°W
5	Mount Shasta	California	178	39	41.42°N 122.2°W
6	Mount Hood	Oregon	178	30	45.374°N 121.694°W
7	Three Sisters	Oregon	165	30	44.133°N 121.767°W
8	Akutan Island	Alaska	161	47	54.134°N 165.986°W
9	Makushin Volcano	Alaska	161	47	53.891°N 166.923°W
10	Mount Spurr	Alaska	160	48	61.299°N 152.251°W
11	Lassen volcanic center	California	153	32	40.492°N 121.508°W
12	Augustine Volcano	Alaska	151	48	59.363°N 153.43°W
13	Newberry Volcano	Oregon	146	30	43.722°N 121.229°W
14	Mount Baker	Washington	139	15	48.777°N 121.813°W
15	Glacier Peak	Washington	135	37	48.112°N 121.113°W
16	Mauna Loa	Hawaii	131	4	19.475°N 155.608°W
17	Crater Lake	Oregon	129	37	42.93°N 122.12°W
18	Long Valley Caldera	California	129	29	37.7°N 118.87°W
19	Mount Okmok	Alaska	117	47	53.43°N 168.13°W
20	Iliamna Volcano	Alaska	115	34	60.032°N 153.09°W
21	Yellowstone caldera	Wyoming	115	27	44.43°N 110.67°W
22	Aniakchak Crater	Alaska	112	41	56.88°N 158.17°W
23	Hualālai	Hawaii	109	27	19.692°N 155.87°W
24	Mono-Inyo Craters	California	106	29	37.88°N 119°W
25	Mount Martin	Alaska	106	23	58.172°N 155.361°W
26	Mount Mageik	Alaska	106	23	58.195°N 155.253°W
27	Trident Volcano	Alaska	106	29	58.236°N 155.1°W
28	Mount Katmai	Alaska	106	35	58.28°N 154.963°W
29	Mount Veniaminof	Alaska	102	47	56.17°N 159.38°W
30	Atka volcanic complex	Alaska	102	35	52.381°N 174.154°W
31	Korovin Volcano	Alaska	102	35	52.381°N 174.166°W
32	Shishaldin Volcano	Alaska	93	41	54.756°N 163.97°W
33	Clear Lake volcanic field	California	92	15	38.97°N 122.77°W
34	Mount Adams	Washington	92	15	46.206°N 121.49°W
35	Hayes Volcano	Alaska	90	34	61.64°N 152.411°W
36	Westdahl Peak	Alaska	89	47	54.518°N 164.65°W
37	Novarupta	Alaska	88	35	58.27°N 155.157°W
38	Mount Churchill	Alaska	82	29	61.38°N 141.75°W
39	Kanaga Volcano	Alaska	81	41	51.923°N 177.168°W
40	Ugashik-Peulik volcanic complex	Alaska	81	41	57.751°N 156.368°W
41	Pavlof Volcano	Alaska	81	35	55.42°N 161.887°W
42	Mount Griggs	Alaska	79	23	58.354°N 155.092°W
43	Kaguyak Crater	Alaska	79	29	58.608°N 154.028°W
44	Pagan Island	Northern Mariana Islands	79	28	18.13°N 145.8°E
45	Medicine Lake	California	78	19	41.58°N 121.57°W
46	Great Sitkin Volcano	Alaska	76	41	52.076°N 176.13°W
47	Kasatochi Island	Alaska	75	35	52.177°N 175.508°W
48	Mount Cleveland	Alaska	75	35	52.825°N 169.944°W
49	Mount Moffett	Alaska	73	17	51.944°N 176.747°W
50	Seguam Island	Alaska	73	47	52.315°N 172.51°W
51	Fisher Caldera	Alaska	71	35	54.65°N 164.43°W
52	Snowy Mountain	Alaska	71	12	58.336°N 154.682°W
53	Fourpeaked Mountain	Alaska	71	12	58.77°N 153.672°W
54	Mount Douglas	Alaska	71	12	58.855°N 153.542°W
55	Semisopochnoi Island	Alaska	70	41	51.93°N 179.58°E
56	Salton Buttes	California	68	14	33.2°N 115.62°W
57	Agrigan Island	Northern Mariana Islands	67	24	18.77°N 145.67°E
58	Mount Edgecumbe	Alaska	65	23	57.05°N 135.75°W
59	Mount Vsevidof	Alaska	65	29	53.13°N 168.693°W
60	Mount Gareloi	Alaska	64	35	51.79°N 178.794°W
61	Tanaga Volcano	Alaska	64	29	51.885°N 178.146°W
62	Alamagan Island	Northern Mariana Islands	64	24	17.6°N 145.83°E
63	Anatahan Island	Northern Mariana Islands	64	18	16.35°N 145.67°E
64	Mount Dutton	Alaska	63	12	55.168°N 162.272°W
65	Roundtop Mountain	Alaska	62	12	54.8°N 163.589°W
66	Kukak Volcano	Alaska	62	12	58.453°N 154.355°W
67	Mount Recheschnoi	Alaska	61	23	53.157°N 168.539°W
68	Valles Caldera	New Mexico	60	20	35.87°N 106.57°W
69	Mono Lake volcanic field	California	57	22	38°N 119.03°W
70	Kiska Volcano	Alaska	55	34	52.103°N 177.602°E
71	Mount Chiginagak	Alaska	55	23	57.135°N 156.99°W
72	Coso volcanic field	California	55	15	36.03°N 117.82°W
73	Emmons Lake	Alaska	54	23	55.341°N 162.079°W
74	Pavlof Sister	Alaska	54	23	55.453°N 161.843°W
75	Little Sitkin Island	Alaska	53	24	51.95°N 178.543°E
76	Bogoslof Island	Alaska	52	35	53.93°N 168.03°W
77	Mount Dana	Alaska	52	29	55.641°N 161.214°W
78	Soda Lakes	Nevada	51	13	39.53°N 118.87°W
79	Mount Adagdak	Alaska	51	6	51.988°N 176.592°W
80	San Francisco Volcanic Field	Arizona	51	20	35.37°N 111.5°W
81	Yantarni Volcano	Alaska	49	29	57.019°N 157.185°W
82	Dotsero	Colorado	49	13	39.65°N 107.03°W
83	Guguan Island	Northern Mariana Islands	48	24	17.32°N 145.85°E
84	Takawangha volcano	Alaska	47	17	51.873°N 178.006°W
85	Frosty Peak	Alaska	46	12	55.082°N 162.814°W
86	Haleakalā	Hawaii	45	3	20.708°N 156.25°W
87	Mount Denison	Alaska	44	12	58.418°N 154.449°W
88	Mount Steller	Alaska	44	12	58.43°N 154.4°W
89	Black Peak	Alaska	44	29	56.552°N 158.785°W
90	Mammoth Mountain	California	42	2	37.58°N 119.05°W
91	Amukta Island	Alaska	41	29	52.5°N 171.252°W
92	Ukinrek maars	Alaska	41	17	57.832°N 156.51°W
93	Mount Kupreanof	Alaska	40	12	56.011°N 159.797°W
94	Mount Bachelor	Oregon	39	7	43.979°N 121.688°W
95	Farallon de Pajaros	Northern Mariana Islands	37	20	20.53°N 144.9°E
96	Sarigan Island	Northern Mariana Islands	36	18	16.708°N 145.78°E
97	East Diamante	Northern Mariana Islands	36	18	15.93°N 145.67°E
98	Yunaska Island	Alaska	36	29	52.643°N 170.629°W
99	Ubehebe Crater	California	35	15	37.02°N 117.45°W
100	Kagamil Volcano	Alaska	35	17	52.974°N 169.72°W
101	Mount Wrangell	Alaska	35	3	62°N 144.02°W
102	Black Rock Desert	Utah	34	15	38.97°N 112.5°W
103	Asuncion Island	Northern Mariana Islands	32	16	19.67°N 145.4°E
104	Mount Kialagvik	Alaska	32	12	57.203°N 156.745°W
105	St. Michael Island	Alaska	31	12	63.45°N 162.12°W
106	Mauna Kea	Hawaii	30	2	19.82°N 155.47°W
107	Carlisle Island	Alaska	29	12	52.894°N 170.054°W
108	Tana	Alaska	29	12	52.83°N 169.77°W
109	Zealandia Bank	Northern Mariana Islands	28	16	16.88°N 145.85°E
110	Segula Island	Alaska	27	10	52.015°N 178.136°E
111	Koniuji Island	Alaska	26	17	52.22°N 175.13°W
112	Ingakslugwat Hills	Alaska	26	10	61.43°N 164.47°W
113	Herbert Island	Alaska	23	12	52.742°N 170.111°W
114	Uliaga Island	Alaska	23	12	53.065°N 169.77°W
115	Chagulak Island	Alaska	22	10	52.577°N 171.13°W
116	Bobrof Volcano	Alaska	20	6	51.91°N 177.438°W
117	Amak Island	Alaska	20	12	55.424°N 163.149°W
118	Supply Reef	Northern Mariana Islands	20	12	20.13°N 145.1°E
119	South Sarigan Seamount	Northern Mariana Islands	20	12	16.58°N 145.78°E
120	Tutuila Island	American Samoa	19	4	14.295°S 170.7°W
121	(unnamed)	Alaska	17	12	57.87°N 155.42°W
122	Maug Islands	Northern Mariana Islands	16	8	20.02°N 145.22°E
123	Hell's Half Acre	Idaho	14	1	43.5°N 112.45°W
124	Craters of the Moon	Idaho	14	0	43.42°N 113.5°W
125	Mount Jefferson	Oregon	13	0	44.692°N 121.8°W
126	Taʻū Island	American Samoa	12	0	14.23°S 169.454°W
127	Ofu-Olosega	American Samoa	12	0	14.175°S 169.618°W
128	Wide Bay cone	Alaska	12	1	53.968°N 166.677°W
129	Buldir Volcano	Alaska	12	5	52.35°N 175.911°E
130	Davidof Island	Alaska	12	5	51.97°N 178.33°E
131	Indian Heaven	Washington	12	0	45.93°N 121.82°W
132	Belknap Crater	Oregon	12	2	44.285°N 121.841°W
133	Markagunt Plateau	Utah	11	8	37.58°N 112.67°W
134	West Crater	Washington	11	1	45.88°N 122.08°W
135	Buzzard Creek	Alaska	10	2	64.07°N 148.42°W
136	Black Butte Crater	Idaho	10	1	43.18°N 114.35°W
137	Wapi Flow	Idaho	8	0	42.88°N 113.22°W
138	Carrizozo Mountain	New Mexico	6	0	33.78°N 105.93°W
139	Stepovak Bay group	Alaska	6	2	55.93°N 160°W
140	Blue Lake crater	Oregon	6	1	44.42°N 121.77°W
141	Zuni-Bandera volcanic field	New Mexico	5	0	34.8°N 108°W
142	Sand Mountain volcanic field	Oregon	5	1	44.38°N 121.93°W
143	Duncan Canal	Alaska	5	1	56.5°N 133.1°W
144	Red Hill–Quemado volcanic field	New Mexico	5	0	34.25°N 108.83°W
145	Tlevak Strait-Suemez Island	Alaska	5	0	55.25°N 133.3°W
146	Behm Canal-Rudyerd Bay	Alaska	5	1	55.32°N 131.05°W
147	Davis Lake	Oregon	4	0	43.57°N 121.82°W
148	Jordan Craters	Oregon	4	0	43.15°N 117.47°W
149	St. Paul Island	Alaska	4	0	57.18°N 170.3°W
150	Cinnamon Butte	Oregon	3	0	43.241°N 122.108°W
151	Devils Garden	Oregon	3	0	43.512°N 120.861°W
152	Diamond Craters	Oregon	3	0	43.1°N 118.75°W
153	Uinkaret volcanic field	Arizona	2	0	36.38°N 113.13°W
154	Golden Trout Creek volcanic field	California	2	0	36.358°N 118.32°W
155	Fukujin Seamount	Northern Mariana Islands	0	0	21.93°N 143.47°E
156	Kasuga 2	Northern Mariana Islands	0	0	21.93°N 143.47°E
157	Daikoku Seamount	Northern Mariana Islands	0	0	21.6°N 143.637°E
158	Ahyi Seamount	Northern Mariana Islands	0	0	21.324°N 144.194°E
159	Ruby Seamount	Northern Mariana Islands	0	0	20.42°N 145.03°E
160	Esmeralda Bank	Northern Mariana Islands	0	0	15.62°N 145.57°E
161	Imuruk Lake	Alaska	0	0	15°N 145.25°W

== Reception ==
Mackenzie, Muschalik & Broesche (2021) provided comments on the 2018 report in three separately authored sections. Broesche believes that Yellowstone should be ranked higher due to the size of the volcano and the popularity of Yellowstone National Park, and Muschalik considers Mount Rainier to be just as dangerous as Kilauea due to its proximity to large population centers in Washington. Mackenzie considers Yellowstone to be just as hazardous as Kilauea.

== See also ==
- List of volcanoes in the United States
- Decade Volcanoes
- National Volcano Early Warning and Monitoring System
