= Alaska Volcano Observatory =

Research center in Alaska, United States

Coordinates: 61.18859°N 149.8044°W

- Alaska Volcano Observatory

Agency overview
- Formed: 1988
- Headquarters: Anchorage, Alaska, USA Fairbanks, Alaska, USA
- Agency executives: Matthew Haney, Scientist-in-Charge (USGS); David Fee, Coordinating Scientist (UAFGI)
- Website: www.avo.alaska.edu

The Alaska Volcano Observatory (AVO) is a joint program of the United States Geological Survey (USGS), the Geophysical Institute of the University of Alaska Fairbanks (UAFGI), and the State of Alaska Division of Geological and Geophysical Surveys (ADGGS). AVO was formed in 1988, and uses federal, state, and university resources to monitor and study Alaska's volcanology, hazardous volcanoes, to predict and record eruptive activity, and to mitigate volcanic hazards to life and property. The Observatory website allows users to monitor active volcanoes, with seismographs and webcameras that update regularly. AVO monitors more than 20 volcanoes in Cook Inlet, which is close to Alaskan population centers, and the Aleutian Arc due to the hazard that plumes of ash pose to aviation.

AVO operates out of two locations. One is at the U.S. Geological Survey office on the campus of Alaska Pacific University in Anchorage. Other AVO offices are at the Geophysical Institute of the University of Alaska in Fairbanks.

== Monitored volcanoes ==
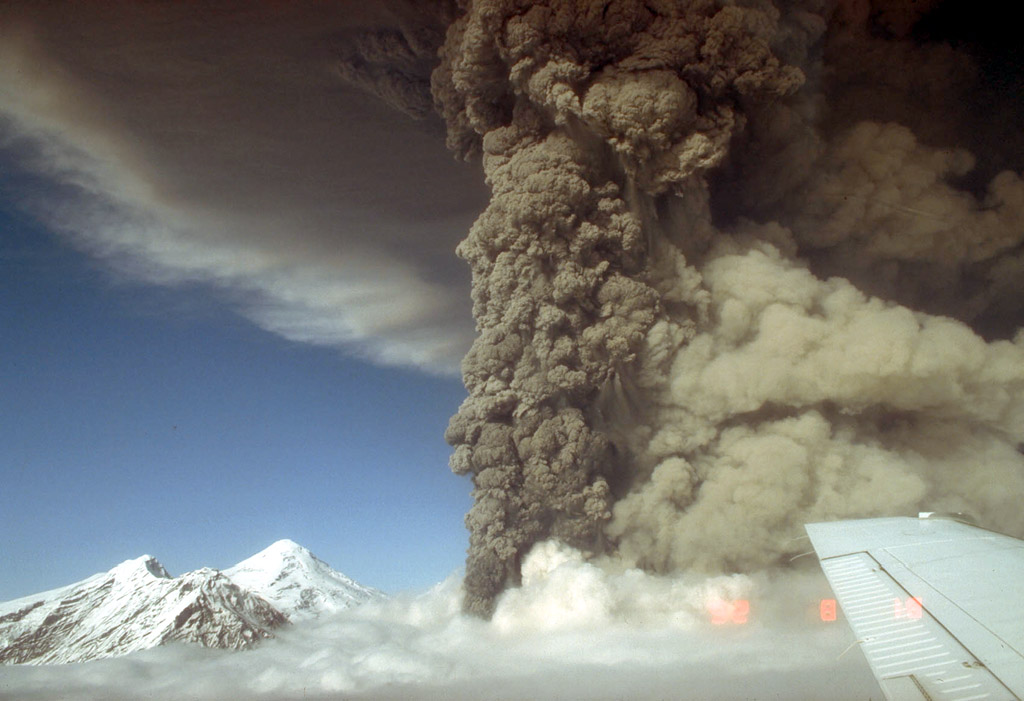
Eruption column from Crater Peak vent, Mount Spurr volcano, 1992

The following list shows volcanoes regularly monitored by the Alaska Volcano Observatory using activity detection instruments. While the majority of these volcanoes are in remote locations and would only pose a threat to aviation, there are a few in some areas that could have an impact on populated communities.

- Akutan Peak on Akutan Island in the Fox Islands group
- Aniakchak Crater in Aniakchak National Monument and Preserve on the Alaska Peninsula (includes Aniakchak Peak and Vent Mountain)
- Atka Volcanic Complex on Atka Island in the Andreanof Islands group (includes Kliuchef, Konia, Korovin and Sarichef volcanoes)
- Augustine Volcano on Augustine Island in the Cook Inlet
- Fisher Caldera on Unimak Island in the Fox Islands group
- Great Sitkin Volcano on Great Sitkin Island in the Andreanof Islands group
- Iliamna Volcano in the Chigmit Mountains within Lake Clark National Park and Preserve
- Isanotski Peaks on Unimak Island in the Fox Islands group
- Kanaga Volcano on Kanaga Island in the Andreanof Islands group
- Little Sitkin Volcano on Little Sitkin Island in the Rat Islands group
- Makushin Volcano on Unalaska Island in the Fox Islands group
- Mount Cleveland on Chuginadak Island in the Islands of Four Mountains group
- Mount Dutton on the Alaska Peninsula near Cold Bay
- Mount Edgecumbe on Kruzof Island near Sitka
- Mount Gareloi on Gareloi Island in the Andreanof Islands group
- Mount Griggs in the Aleutian Range within Katmai National Park and Preserve
- Mount Katmai in the Aleutian Range within Katmai National Park and Preserve
- Mount Mageik in the Aleutian Range within Katmai National Park and Preserve
- Mount Martin in the Aleutian Range within Katmai National Park and Preserve
- Mount Peulik on the Alaska Peninsula near Becharof Lake
- Mount Spurr in the Alaska Range near Anchorage (includes Crater Peak)
- Mount Veniaminof on the Alaska Peninsula near Perryville
- Mount Wrangell in the Wrangell Mountains of southeastern Alaska
- Novarupta in the Aleutian Range within Katmai National Park and Preserve
- Okmok Caldera on Umnak Island in the Fox Islands group (includes Mount Okmok, Jag Peak and Tulik Volcano)
- Pavlof Volcano on the Alaska Peninsula near Cold Bay
- Redoubt Volcano in the Chigmit Mountains within Lake Clark National Park and Preserve
- Semisopochnoi Volcano on Semisopochnoi Island in the Rat Islands group (includes Anvil Peak and Mount Young)
- Shishaldin Volcano on Unimak Island in the Fox Islands group
- Snowy Mountain in the Aleutian Range within Katmai National Park and Preserve
- Takawangha Volcano on Tanaga Island in the Andreanof Islands group
- Tanaga Volcano on Tanaga Island in the Andreanof Islands group
- Trident Volcano in the Aleutian Range within Katmai National Park and Preserve
- Ugashik Caldera on the Alaska Peninsula near Becharof Lake
- Ukinrek Maars on the Alaska Peninsula near Becharof Lake
- Westdahl Volcano on Unimak Island in the Fox Islands group (includes Faris and Westdahl peaks)

The following list shows select volcanoes monitored by AVO but currently do not have activity detection instruments and generally rely on satellite and local observations. These primarily include volcanoes that have had eruptions or other volcanic activity in recent years. Such monitoring is not limited to the volcanoes listed below and more could be added in the future if necessary.

- Bogoslof Volcano on Bogoslof Island in the Fox Islands group
- Davidof Volcano on Davidof Island in the Rat Islands group
- Fourpeaked Mountain in the Aleutian Range within Katmai National Park and Preserve
- Kasatochi Volcano on Kasatochi Island in the Andreanof Islands group
- Kiska Volcano on Kiska Island in the Rat Islands group
- Mount Chiginagak on the Alaska Peninsula near Ugashik
- Mount Douglas in the Aleutian Range within Katmai National Park and Preserve
- Mount Kupreanof on the Alaska Peninsula near Perryville
- Seguam Volcano on Seguam Island in the Andreanof Islands group (includes Pyre Peak)

== See also ==
- Geophysical Institute
- Kamchatka Volcanic Eruption Response Team
- United States Geological Survey
