= Mount Mageik =

Volcano in Alaska, United States

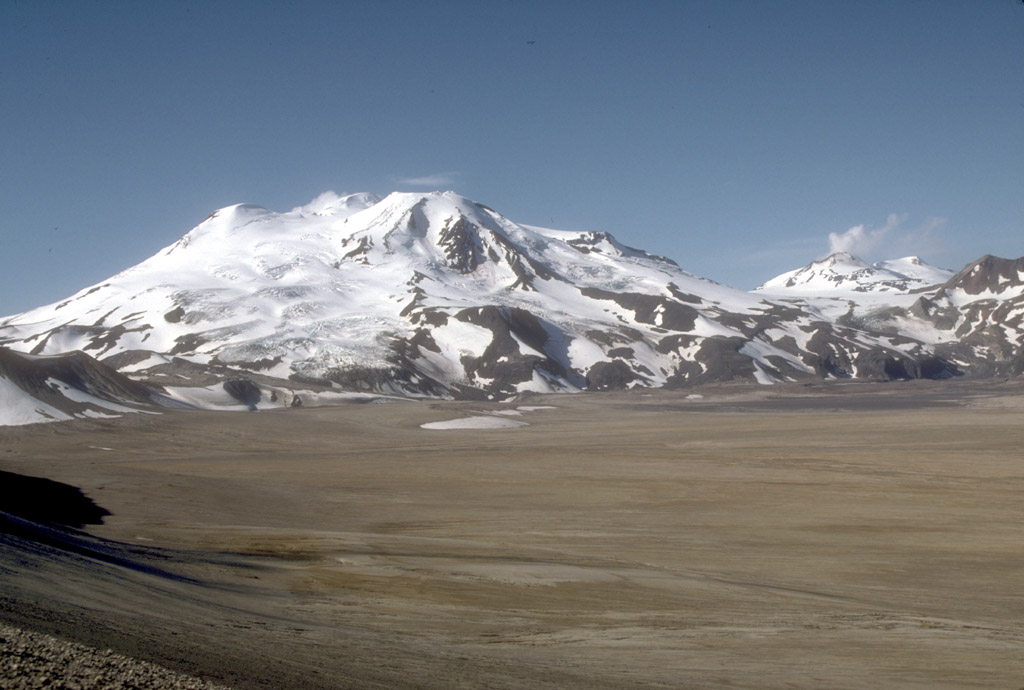
- Mount Mageik (left) and Mount Martin (right)

Highest point
- Elevation: 7,101 ft (2,164 m)
- Prominence: 4,449 ft (1,356 m)
- Listing: List of mountains of Alaska
- Coordinates: 58°11′44″N 155°15′13″W

Geography
- Location within Alaska
- Location: Katmai National Park and Preserve, Alaska, USA
- Parent range: Aleutian Range
- Topo map: USGS Mount Katmai A-4

Geology
- Formed by: Subduction zone volcanism
- Rock age: Pleistocene to Holocene
- Mountain type: Stratovolcano
- Volcanic arc: Aleutian Arc
- Last eruption: 500 BCE ± 50 years

Mount Mageik /məˈɡiːk/ is a stratovolcano on the Alaska Peninsula. It has no confirmed historical eruptions (one in 1946 is now deemed questionable), but its youngest eruptive products are apparently Holocene in age (8750 to 500 BCE). A young crater lies on the northeast flank of the central summit cone, and is the site of vigorous superheated fumarolic activity with prominent sulfur deposits. The volcanic cones are composed of andesite, basaltic andesite and dacite.

The volcano is mantled in ash from the 1912 eruption of Novarupta and from the 1953 eruption of nearby Trident Volcano.

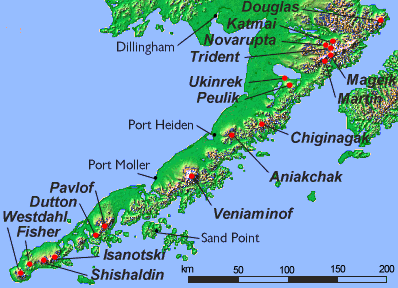
Map showing volcanoes of Alaska Peninsula.

== See also ==
- List of volcanoes in the United States
