= Mount Gilbert (Alaska) =

Mountain in the state of Alaska

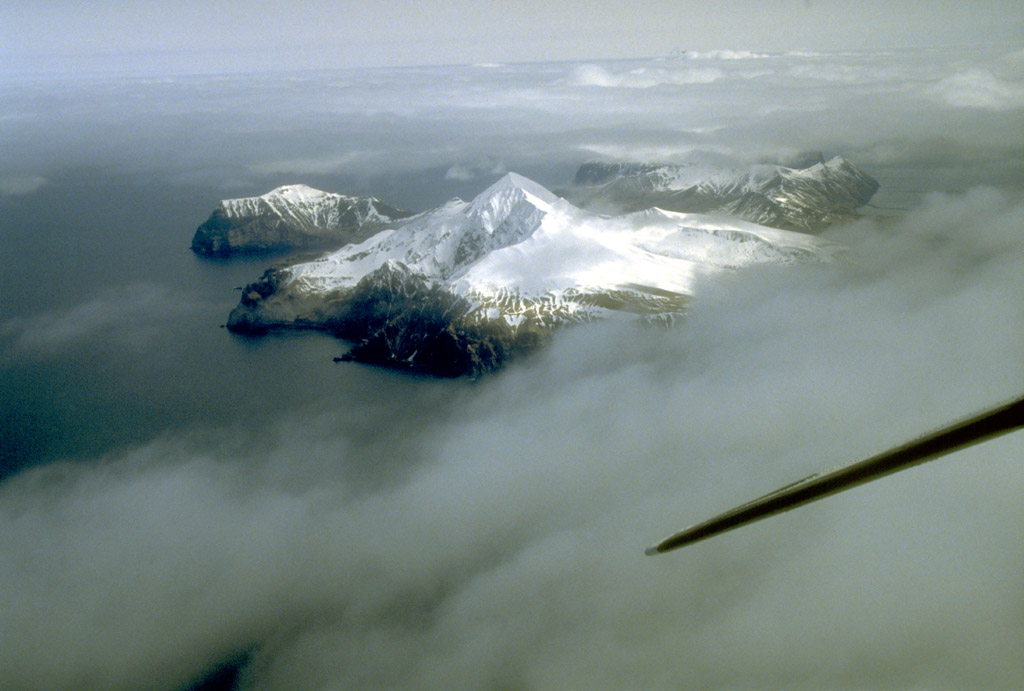
- Mount Gilbert from the air, 1994

Highest point
- Elevation: 2,684 ft (818 m)
- Coordinates: 54°15′08″N 165°39′43″W

Geography
- Location: Akun Island, Alaska, U.S.
- Parent range: Aleutian Range

Geology
- Formed by: Subduction zone volcanism
- Mountain type: Stratovolcano
- Volcanic arc: Aleutian Arc

Mount Gilbert is a volcano which forms the northern part of Akun Island in the eastern Aleutian Islands, USA. Active fumaroles were documented 1 mi (1.5 km) northeast of the summit in the early 1900s.

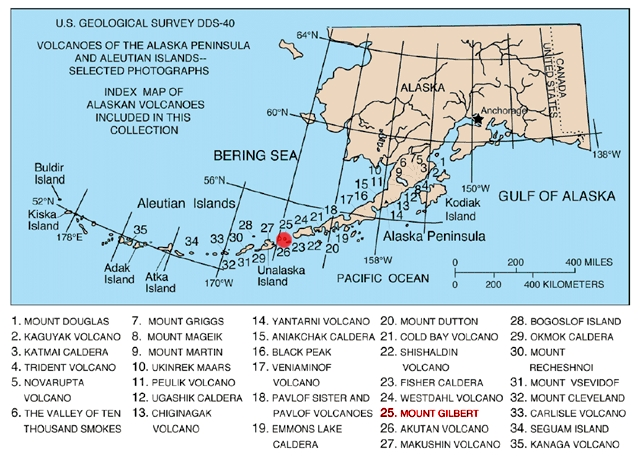
Map of Alaskan volcanoes, with Mount Gilbert marked.

== See also ==
- List of volcanoes in the United States of America

== Sources ==
- Volcanoes of the Alaska Peninsula and Aleutian Islands-Selected Photographs
- Alaska Volcano Observatory
