= Mount Denison =

Mountain in Alaska, United States of America

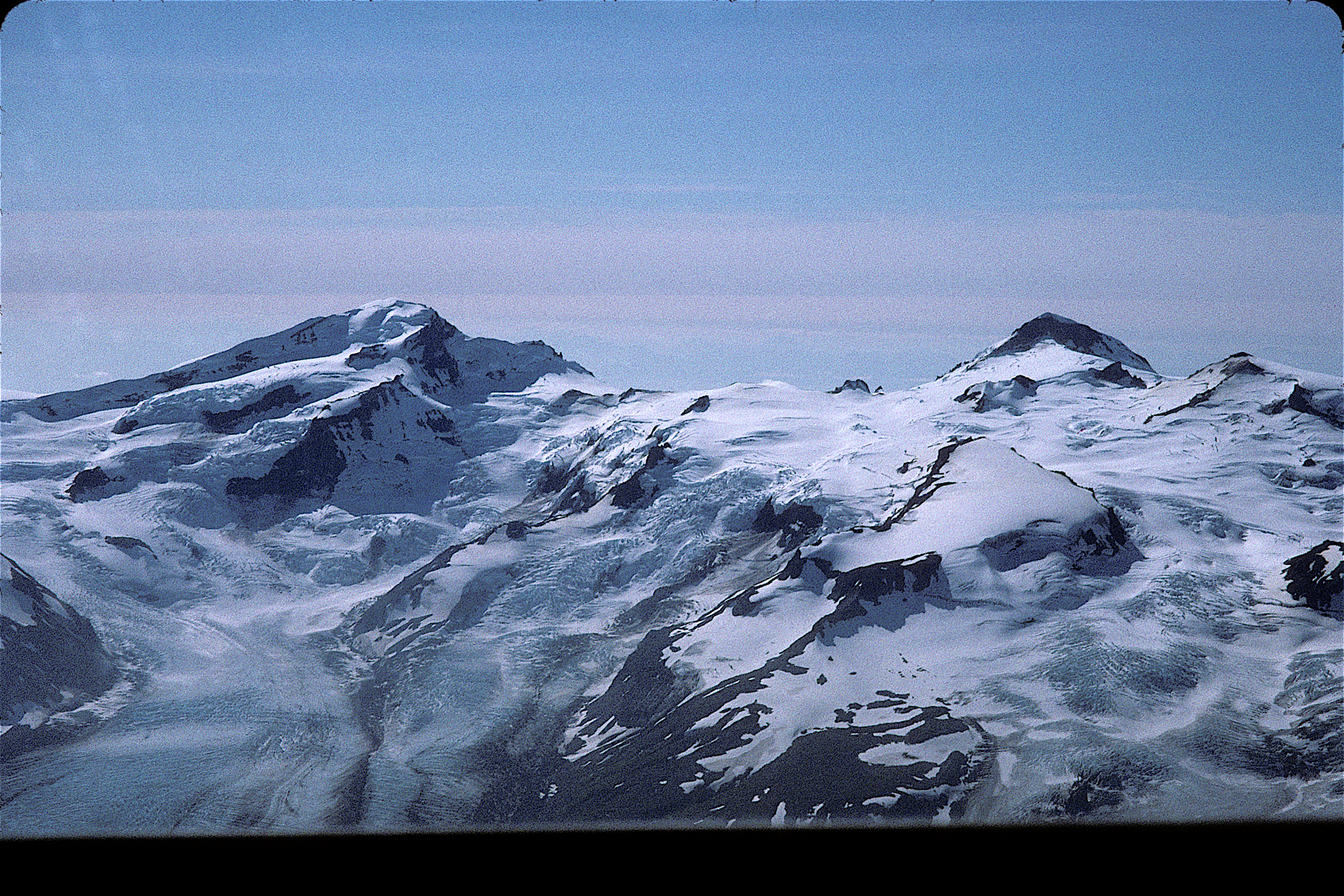
- Mount Denison (right)

Highest point
- Elevation: 7,606 ft (2,318 m)
- Prominence: 1,558 ft (475 m)
- Listing: Mountain peaks of Alaska
- Coordinates: 58°25′N 154°27′W

Geography
- Location within Alaska
- Location: Kodiak Island Borough / Lake and Peninsula Borough, Alaska
- Parent range: Aleutian Range
- Topo map: USGS

Geology
- Formed by: Subduction zone volcanism
- Mountain type: Stratovolcano
- Volcanic arc: Aleutian Arc
- Last eruption: Unknown, probably Holocene

Climbing
- First ascent: 1978, Richard Soaper, Dick McClenahan, et al.
- Easiest route: glacier climb

Mount Denison is a stratovolcano and one of the highest peaks on the Alaska Peninsula. Discovered in 1923 by Harvard professor Kirtley Fletcher Mather, the mountain was named for the geologist's alma mater, Denison University. The mountain's connection to Denison also include its first climbers: all members of the first two ascent teams as well as the group that attempted in 1977 were either students, alumni, or faculty of the university.

Mount Denison is located at the end of a volcanic chain in a heavily glaciated and very remote section of Katmai National Park. It is possibly the tallest mountain in the national park, though some sources list Mount Griggs as the highest. Mount Griggs, on the other hand, is much more accessible, being next to the Valley of Ten Thousand Smokes, which can be reached via the road from the national park's visitor center.

There is no record of an eruption, but Mount Denison was probably active some time in the last 10,000 years (the Holocene epoch).

== See also ==
- List of volcanoes in the United States of America
