= Mount Dana (Alaska) =

Small stratovolcano in Alaska, United States

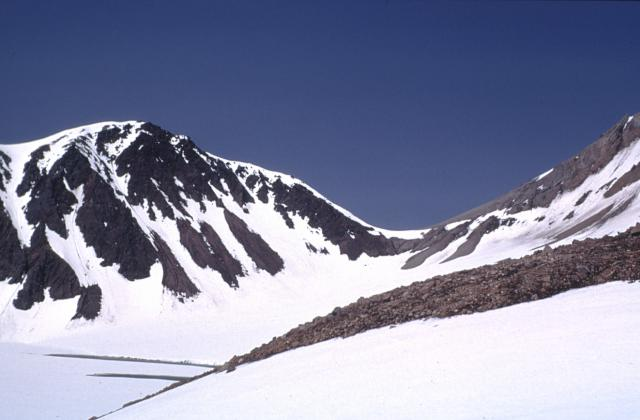
- Crater of Mount Dana

Highest point
- Elevation: 1,354 m (4,442 ft)
- Listing: List of volcanoes in the United States
- Coordinates: 55.641°N 161.214°W

Geography
- Location within Alaska
- Interactive map of Mount Dana
- Location: Alaska Peninsula, United States

Geology
- Formed by: Subduction zone volcanism
- Mountain type: Stratovolcano
- Volcanic arc: Aleutian Arc
- Last eruption: 1890 BCE (?)

Mount Dana is a small stratovolcano of the Alaska Peninsula, United States, located northeast of Canoe Bay inlet at the head of Pavlof Bay. It was the source of a major eruption about 3,840 years ago that produced a pyroclastic flow, which filled valleys south and west of the volcano's crater and reached the sea at Canoe Bay.

== Geography and geology ==
Dana is northeast of the Canoe Bay inlet, as it sits at the top of Pavlof Bay. It is 555 miles (893 km) from Anchorage.

The United States has the most active volcanoes in the world, many of them geologically young. In Alaska, at least 50 volcanoes, including those in the Aleutian archipelago, have erupted in historical time. The state accounts for ~80% of the United States' volcanoes, excluding the seamounts in the area, ~8% of world volcanoes, and most of these are located among the Aleutian Islands. The Aleutian Islands arc serves as the northern boundary of the Pacific Ring of Fire, where tectonic activity generates earthquakes and volcanic eruptions in masses.

Made up of intermediate composition calc-alkaline rocks, the volcano hosts remnants of an andesite-based dome, just off the western side of the crater and east of Knutson Lake. It resides on submarine sandstone and shale, timed at the Jurassic and Cretaceous eras. Rising 1,354 metres (4,442 ft), the volcano is topped by a crater 1.5 kilometers in height by 2 kilometers in width. To the southwest of the caldera, an exposed sector reveals a layer of sedimentary Mesozoic era stone.

Mount Dana is easily accessible from Canoe Bay, at any time of the year.

=== Eruptive history ===
While no recorded eruptions have taken place at the volcano, a flow of blocky lava and volcanic ash is evident on the side of the volcano, streaming into Canoe Bay. Cold springs and an enormous hill of tufa at the volcano also suggest that Dana erupted previously.
