= Mount Adagdak =

Volcano in Alaska, United States

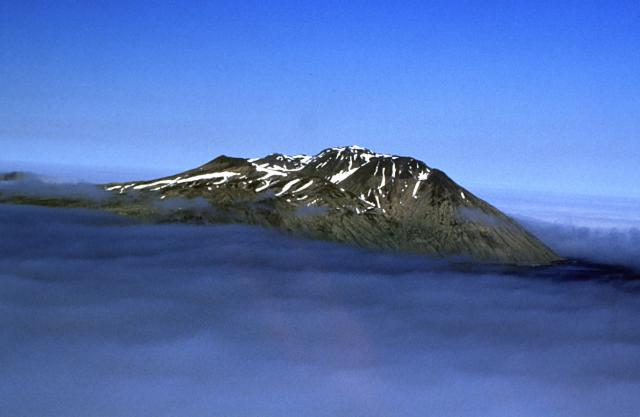
- Mount Adagdak in 2000

Highest point
- Elevation: 2,001 ft (610 m)
- Coordinates: 51°59′16″N 176°35′30″W

Geography
- Location within Alaska
- Location: Adak Island, Alaska, U.S.
- Parent range: Aleutian Range
- Topo map: USGS Adak C-2

Geology
- Formed by: Subduction zone volcanism
- Rock age: Pleistocene
- Mountain type: Stratovolcano
- Volcanic arc: Aleutian Arc

Mount Adagdak is a Pleistocene age stratovolcano on the northernmost extremity of Adak Island in the Aleutian Islands, Alaska. Located about 1,180 miles (1,900 km) from Anchorage, the mountain is located about 1.4 kilometers (0.9 mi) south of Cape Adagdak, for which it was named in 1948 by the United States Geological Survey.

The volcano is made up of rock from three different periods of activity. The youngest rock was argon dated to between 205,000 - 215,000 years old.

John Hunter of Quicklaunch has twice proposed the use of Mount Adagdak's western slope as the emplacement site for a light-gas gun to launch small payloads into orbit for use at ISS.

== See also ==
- List of volcanoes in the United States of America
- List of stratovolcanoes
