= Mount Steller =

Mount Steller is the name of two significant peaks in Alaska, presumably both named for naturalist Georg Wilhelm Steller, an early European visitor to Alaska:

- Mount Steller (Chugach Mountains), a peak at the far eastern end of the Chugach Mountains
- Mount Steller (Aleutian Range), a volcanic peak on the Alaska Peninsula
