= Frosty Peak Volcano =

Volcano in Alaska, United States

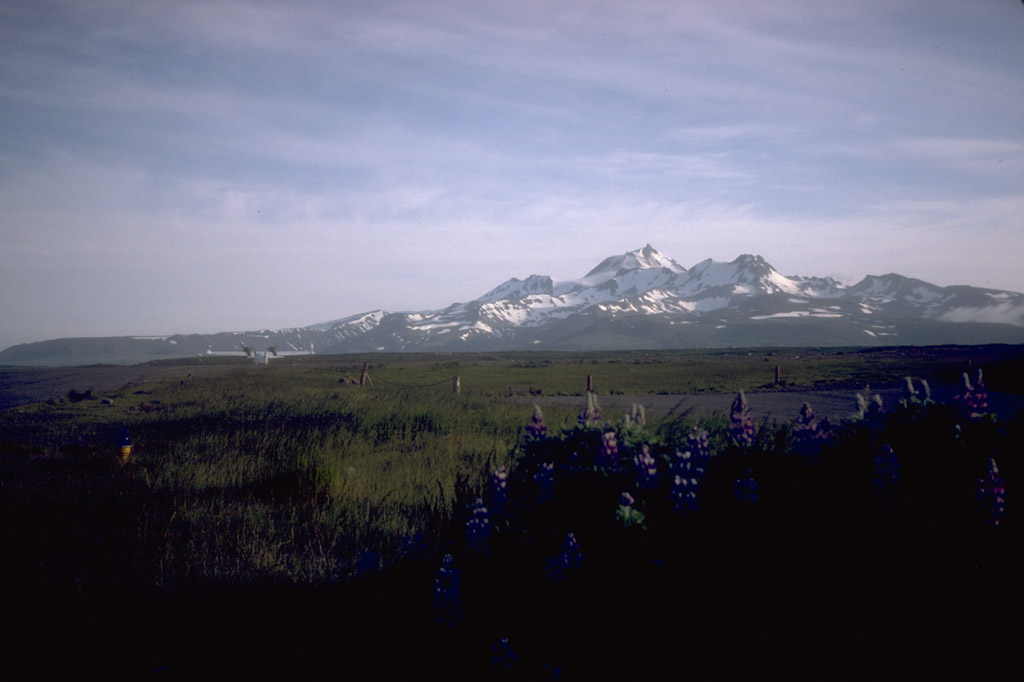
- Frosty Peak Volcano, a stratovolcano at the southwest end of the Alaska Peninsula

Highest point
- Elevation: 6,299 ft (1,920 m)
- Prominence: 6,772 ft (2,064 m)
- Listing: Mountain peaks of Alaska
- Coordinates: 55°04′02″N 162°50′07″W

Geography
- Location within Alaska
- Interactive map of Frosty Peak Volcano
- Location: Alaska Peninsula, Alaska, U.S.
- Parent range: Aleutian Range
- Topo map: USGS McCarthy B-2

Geology
- Formed by: Subduction zone volcanism
- Mountain type: Stratovolcano
- Volcanic arc: Aleutian Arc
- Last eruption: Unknown - Pleistocene or later

Frosty Peak Volcano, also known as Mt. Frosty, Frosty Volcano, or Cold Bay Volcano, is a 6,299 ft (1,920 m) stratovolcano at the southwest end of the Alaska Peninsula in the U.S. state of Alaska.

== History ==
Frosty Peak is the tallest and most recently formed peak of the volcanic complex. Its exact age is unknown, but it was probably formed in the middle to late Pleistocene, and possibly erupted even more recently. Frosty Peak is the southern cone of the double-coned Frosty Volcano, which formed in the middle Pleistocene some time before the Wisconsin Glaciation.

Frosty Volcano itself is located on the northern flank of an even older volcano, the Morzhovoi Volcano. Morzhovoi Volcano was probably formed in the early to middle Pleistocene, and collapsed into a caldera. The highest points that remain from the caldera are called North and South Walrus Peak.

== Gallery ==
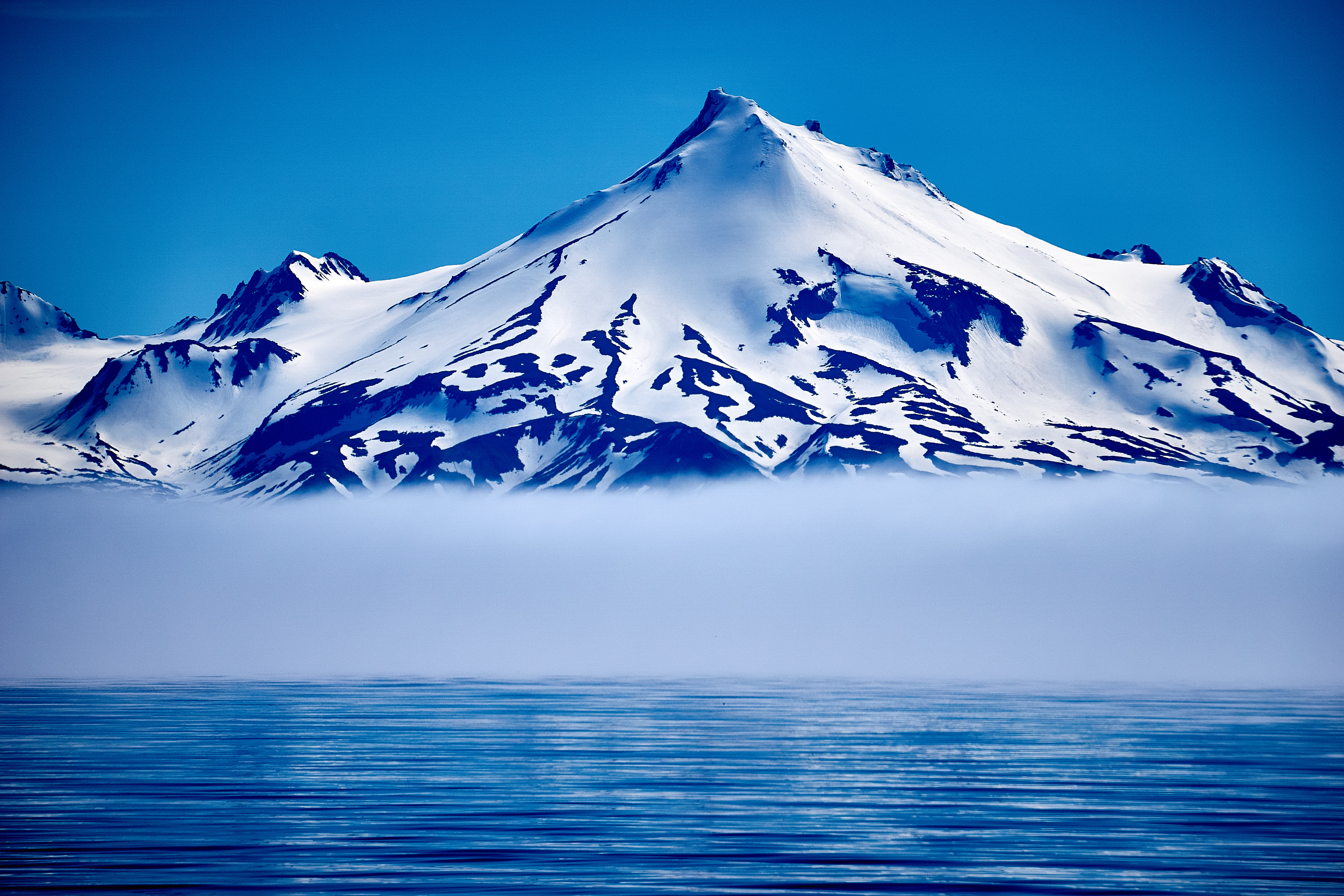
Frosty Peak

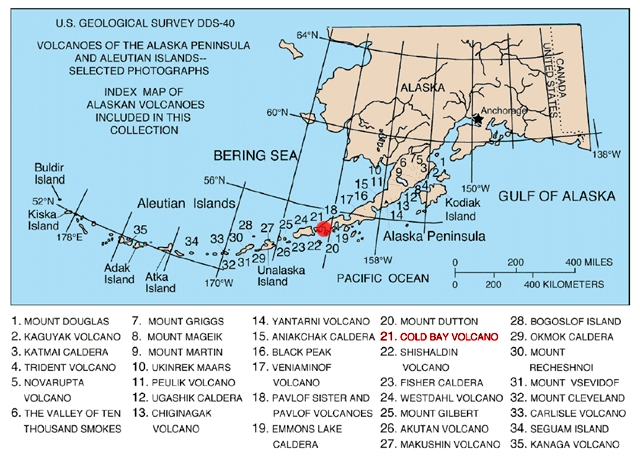
Map showing volcanoes of Alaska. The mark is set at the location of Cold Bay Volcano.

== See also ==
- List of volcanoes in the United States of America
- List of Stratovolcanoes
