= Mount Emmons (Alaska) =

Stratovolcano in Alaska, United States

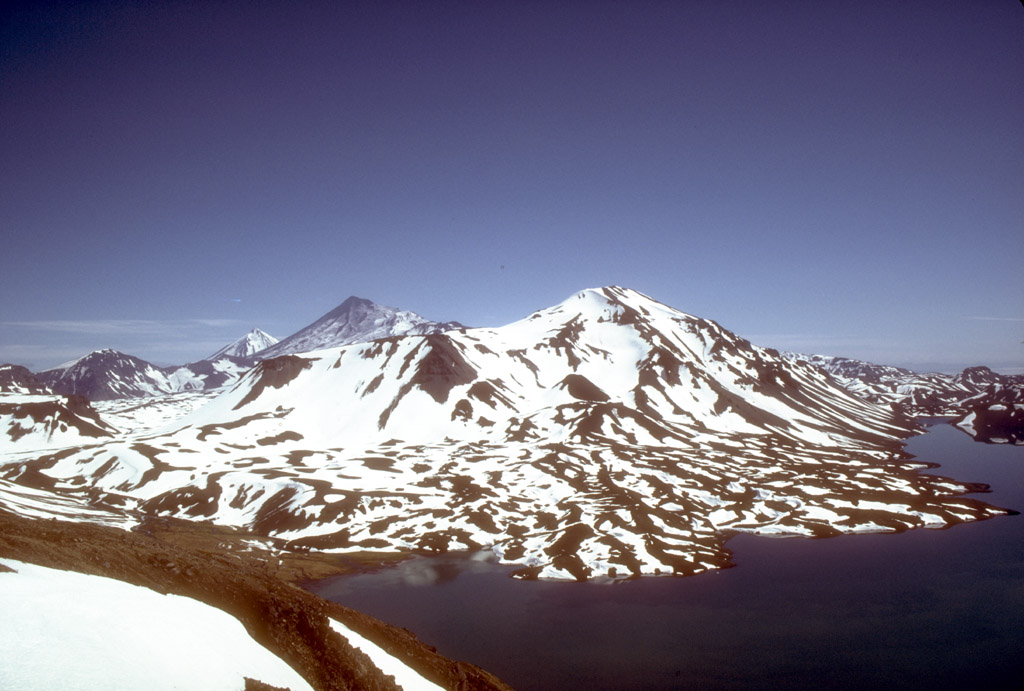
- View, looking northeast, of Mount Emmons in 1987

Highest point
- Elevation: 4,711 ft (1,436 m)
- Listing: List of volcanoes in the United States
- Coordinates: 55°20′27″N 162°04′21″W

Geography
- Location within Alaska
- Location: Alaska Peninsula, Lake and Peninsula Borough, Alaska; United States
- Parent range: Aleutian Range
- Topo map: USGS Cold Bay B-1

Geology
- Formed by: Subduction zone volcanism
- Mountain type: Caldera
- Volcanic arc: Aleutian Arc
- Last eruption: Unknown

Mount Emmons is a post-caldera stratovolcano within the Emmons Lake caldera on the Alaska Peninsula within the Lake and Peninsula Borough, Alaska, United States.

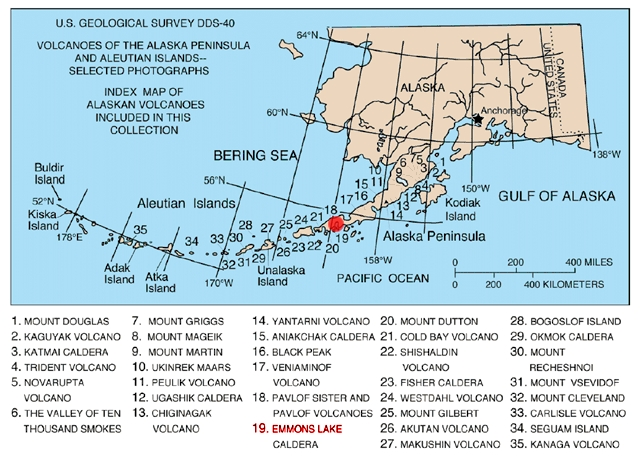
Map showing volcanoes of Alaska. The mark is set at the location of Emmons Lake.

== Description ==
The summit is one of three cones constructed within the 7-by-11-mile (11 km × 18 km) caldera, which also contains an elongated crater lake on its southwest side.

The most recent of several caldera-forming eruptions at Emmons Lake occurred more than 10,000 years ago. No historical eruptions have occurred at Emmons Lake.

The peak is located within the Alaska Peninsula National Wildlife Refuge.

Mount Emmons is a local name published on a USGS map in 1943.

== See also ==
- List of mountain peaks of Alaska
