= Black Peak (Alaska) =

Mountain in Alaska, United States

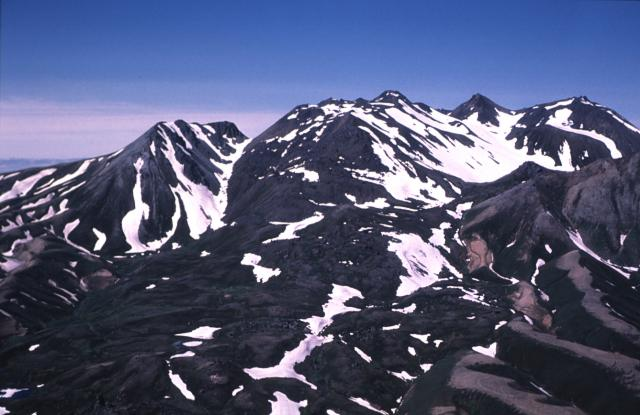

Highest point
- Elevation: 3,385 ft (1,032 m) NGVD 29
- Listing: List of volcanoes in the United States
- Coordinates: 56°33′11″N 158°47′12″W

Geography
- Location within Alaska
- Location: Alaska Peninsula, Alaska, United States
- Topo map: USGS Chignik C-3

Geology
- Formed by: Subduction zone volcanism
- Mountain type: Stratovolcano
- Volcanic arc: Aleutian Arc
- Last eruption: 1900 BCE ± 150 years

Black Peak is a highly eroded stratovolcano comprising a lava dome complex on the Alaska Peninsula of the U.S. state of Alaska. Also called Purple Crater, Black Volcano or Sopka Chornaia, the mountain is located within the Lake and Peninsula Borough.

The latest eruption from Black Peak less than 4,000 years ago produced an explosive VEI-6 eruption that created a caldera. Ash flow tuffs and block and ash flow deposits from this explosive eruption traveled down the Ash Creek and Bluff Creek valleys that reach depths of 100 m (328 ft).
