= Devils Desk =

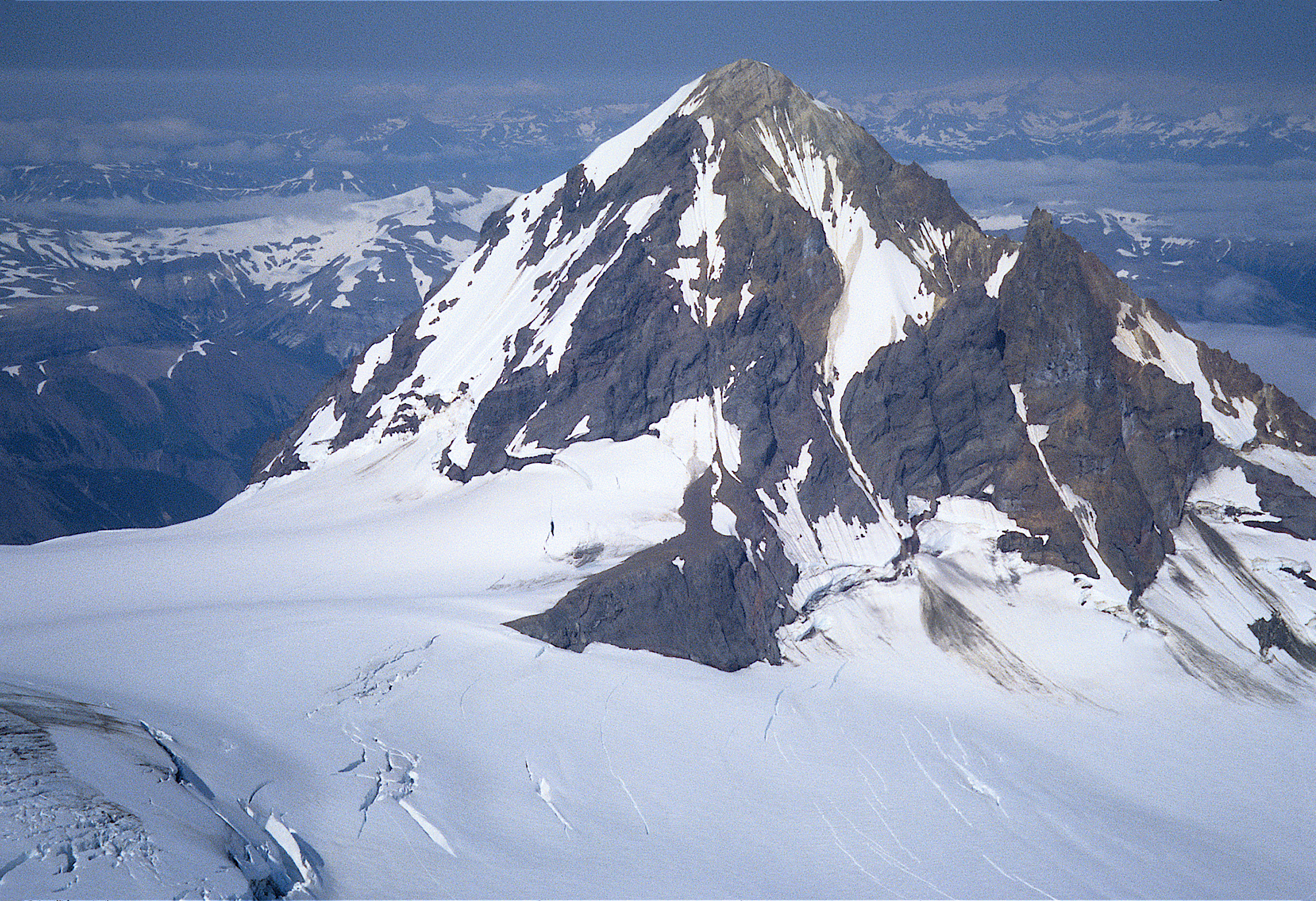

Highest point
- Elevation: 6,411 feet (1,954 m)
- Coordinates: 58°28′32″N 154°17′53″W

Geography
- Location within Alaska
- Location: Alaska

Geology
- Formed by: Subduction zone volcanism

Devils Desk is a stratovolcano in Alaska's Katmai National Park, split between the Kodiak Island and Lake and Peninsula boroughs of that U.S. state. Its peak, which is located in Kodiak Island Borough, lies 5,879 feet (1,792 m) above sea level. It has an elevation of 6,411 ft (1,954 m). The age of the volcano is not certain, but a sample from the southwest face of the volcano was dated at 245,000 years old. The edifice represents the neck of a formerly larger stratovolcano, whose flanks have been removed by glacial erosion. The summit is almost encircled by Hook Glacier.

== See also ==
- List of volcanoes in the United States of America
