= Mount Steller (Aleutian Range) =

Stratovolcano in Alaska, United States

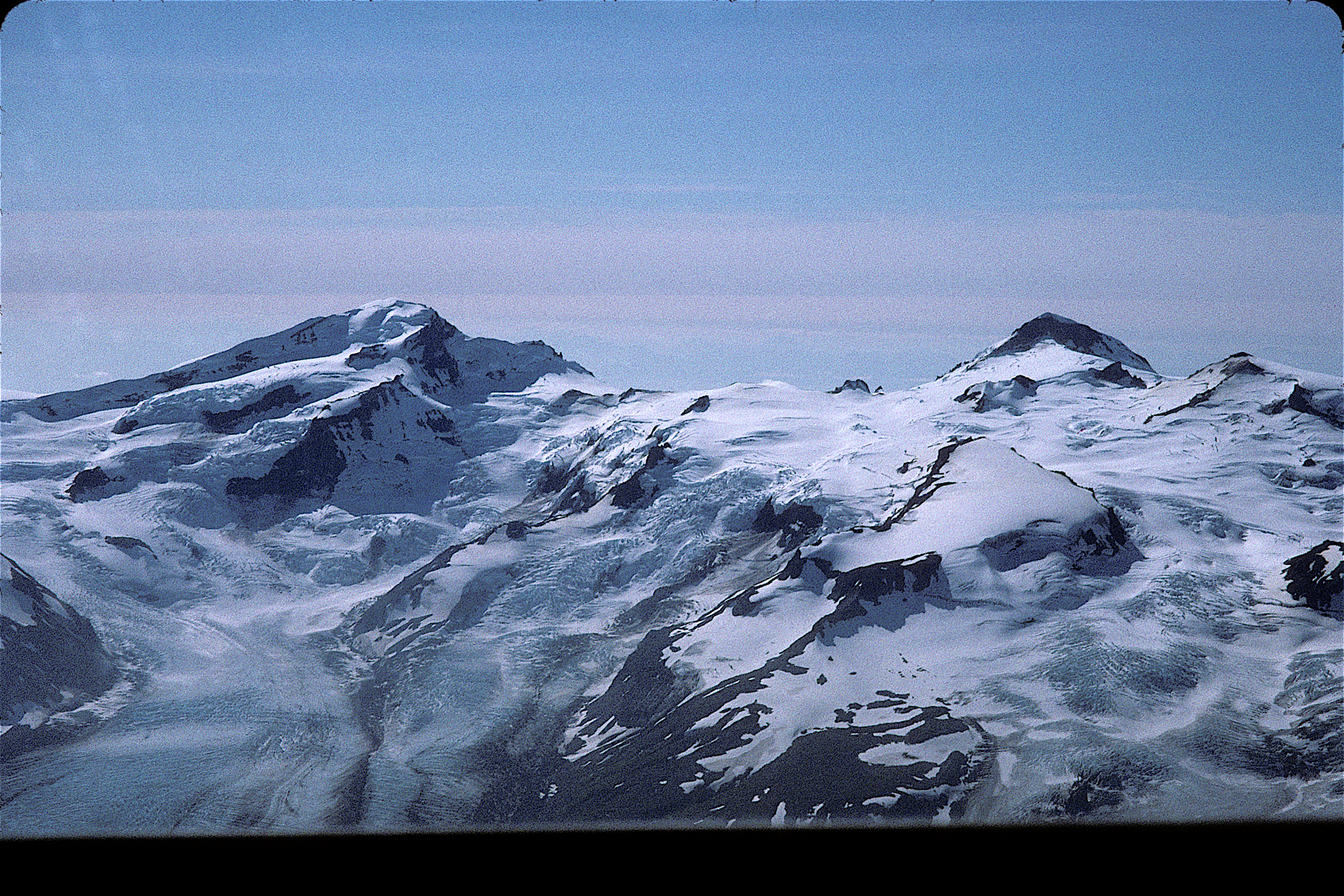
- Mount Steller (to left) in August 2003 (Mount Denison is to the right)

Highest point
- Elevation: 7,454 ft (2,272 m)
- Prominence: 1,600 ft (490 m)
- Coordinates: 58°25′47″N 154°23′29″W

Geography
- Location within Alaska
- Location: Katmai National Park and Preserve, Alaska, U.S.
- Parent range: Aleutian Range

Geology
- Formed by: Subduction zone volcanism
- Mountain type: Stratovolcano
- Volcanic arc: Aleutian Arc

Mount Steller is a stratovolcano in Katmai National Park in Alaska, United States. It is part of the Aleutian Range and is located on the Alaska Peninsula.

The mountain was presumably named for the naturalist Georg Wilhelm Steller. While evidence is uncertain, the volcano is believed to have erupted during the Holocene epoch.

On September 14, 2005, Mt. Steller experienced a large rock-ice avalanche. The estimated volume was between 40 to 60 million m3. The avalanche took place on the south face of the mountain at an altitude of ~3,100 meters. The avalanche traveled for almost 10 km.

== Gallery ==
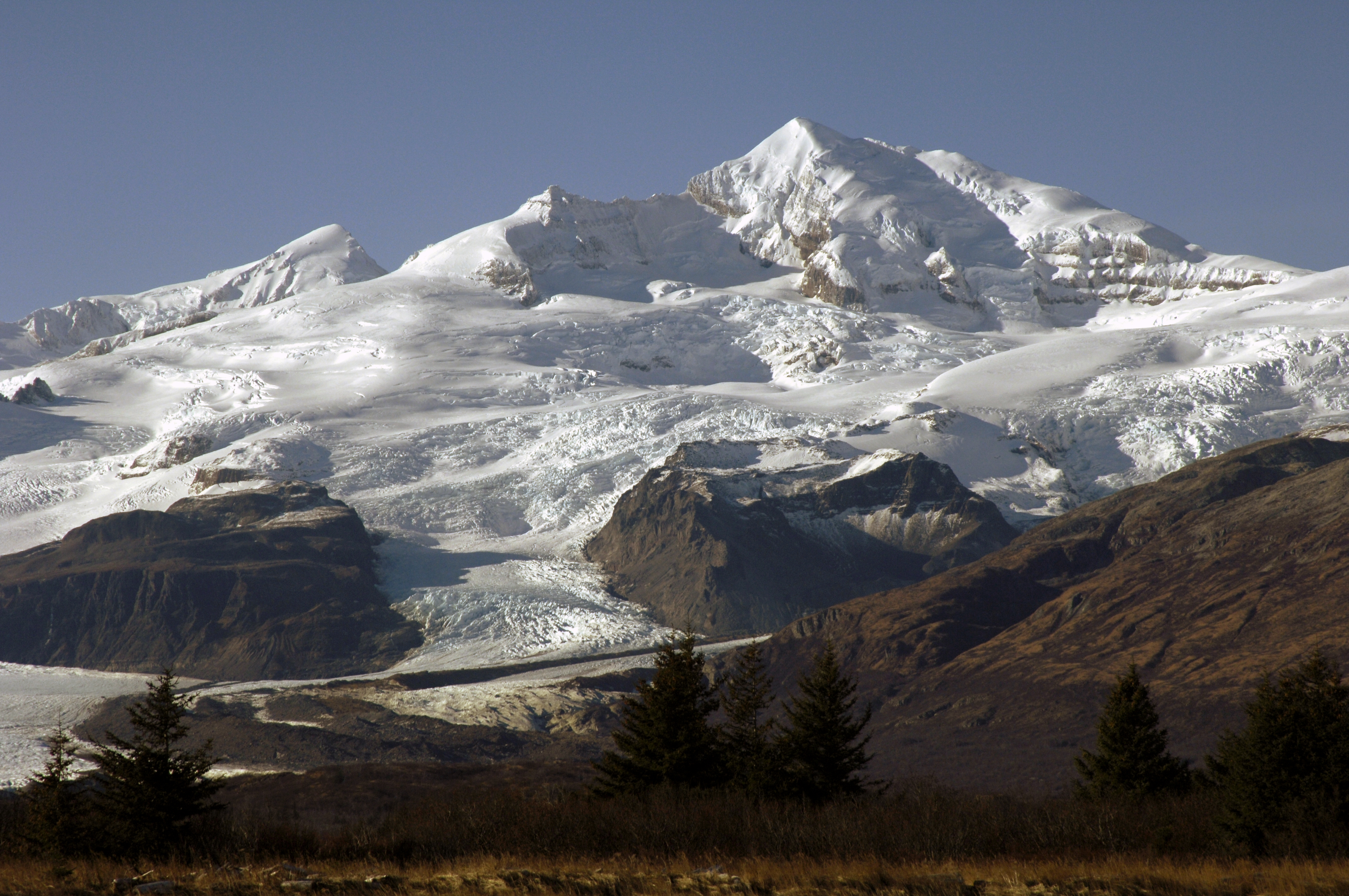
Mount Steller from the east
