= Aleutian Ridge =

Volcanic mountain chain in the Bering Sea

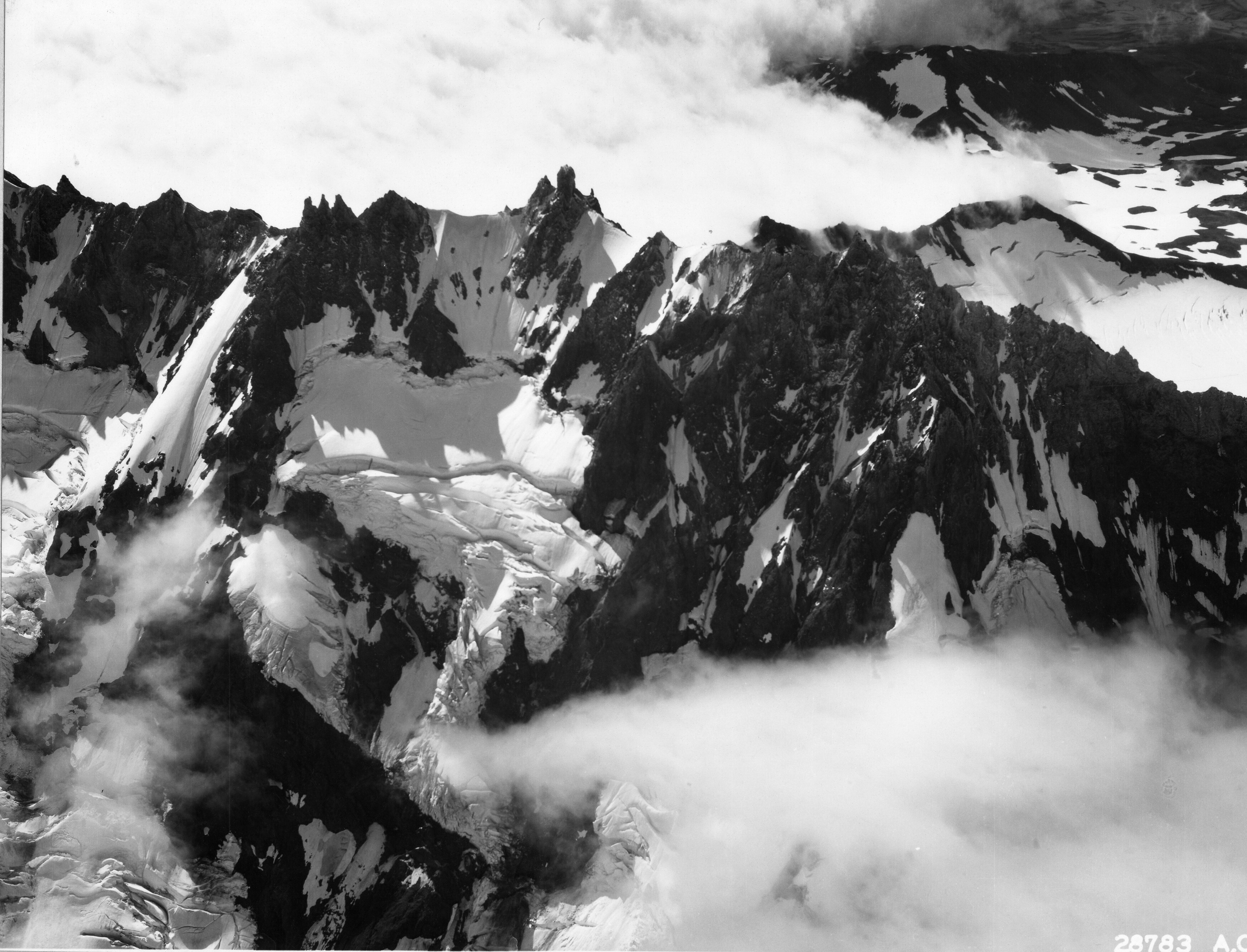
Aleutian Ridge

The Aleutian Ridge is a volcanic mountain chain extending from the Alaska Peninsula westward along the Aleutian Arc in the Bering Sea. It is mostly submerged and was formed by the subduction of the Pacific Plate beneath the North American Plate. The ridge comprises multiple islets varying in topography, shaped by volcanic and tectonic processes from the Eocene period.

== Geography ==
The Aleutian Arc stretches more than 3,000 km (1,900 mi) along the northern rim of the Pacific Basin, from Russia's Kamchatka Peninsula to Cook Inlet, Alaska. It is composed of two distinct segments that meet near Unimak Pass: the Aleutian Ridge, a predominantly submerged volcanic mountain range that includes the Aleutian Islands, and the Alaska Peninsula–Kodiak Island segment. It consists of a chain of volcanic mountains of varying topography located along the crest of a submarine ridge.

== Geology ==
=== Formation ===
The Aleutian Ridge lacks any pre-Eocene rock record, and was formed since then. The ongoing tectonic interaction between the Pacific and North American plates defines the Aleutian Arc's structure and activity. These plates converge at a rate of approximately 85–90 mm (3.3–3.5 in) per year, with nearly perpendicular subduction along the Alaska Peninsula, becoming increasingly oblique toward the western Aleutian Ridge due to the arc's curvature. In the central Aleutians, the subduction angle is about 30° from perpendicular, while in the western ridge, plate motion becomes nearly parallel to the arc.

=== Composition ===
The Aleutian Ridge is composed of three main rock layers, beginning with a lower series that forms its igneous basement. This foundation consists primarily of extrusive and intrusive volcanic rocks and coarse volcanic debris, dating back to the early to middle Eocene (55–50 million years ago). Rapid volcanic activity formed the ridge’s core, peaking around 45–40 million years ago, but slowed by the early Oligocene (around 37 million years ago). As volcanic growth diminished, the middle series began forming—made up of volcaniclastic and silty sediments. These materials buried the submerged flanks of the ridge and continued to accumulate until about 5–6 million years ago, near the end of the Miocene, when the Aleutian Terrace basin started to structurally evolve. Most of the active volcanoes are located on the northern boundaries of the Aleutian Islands.

== Gallery ==
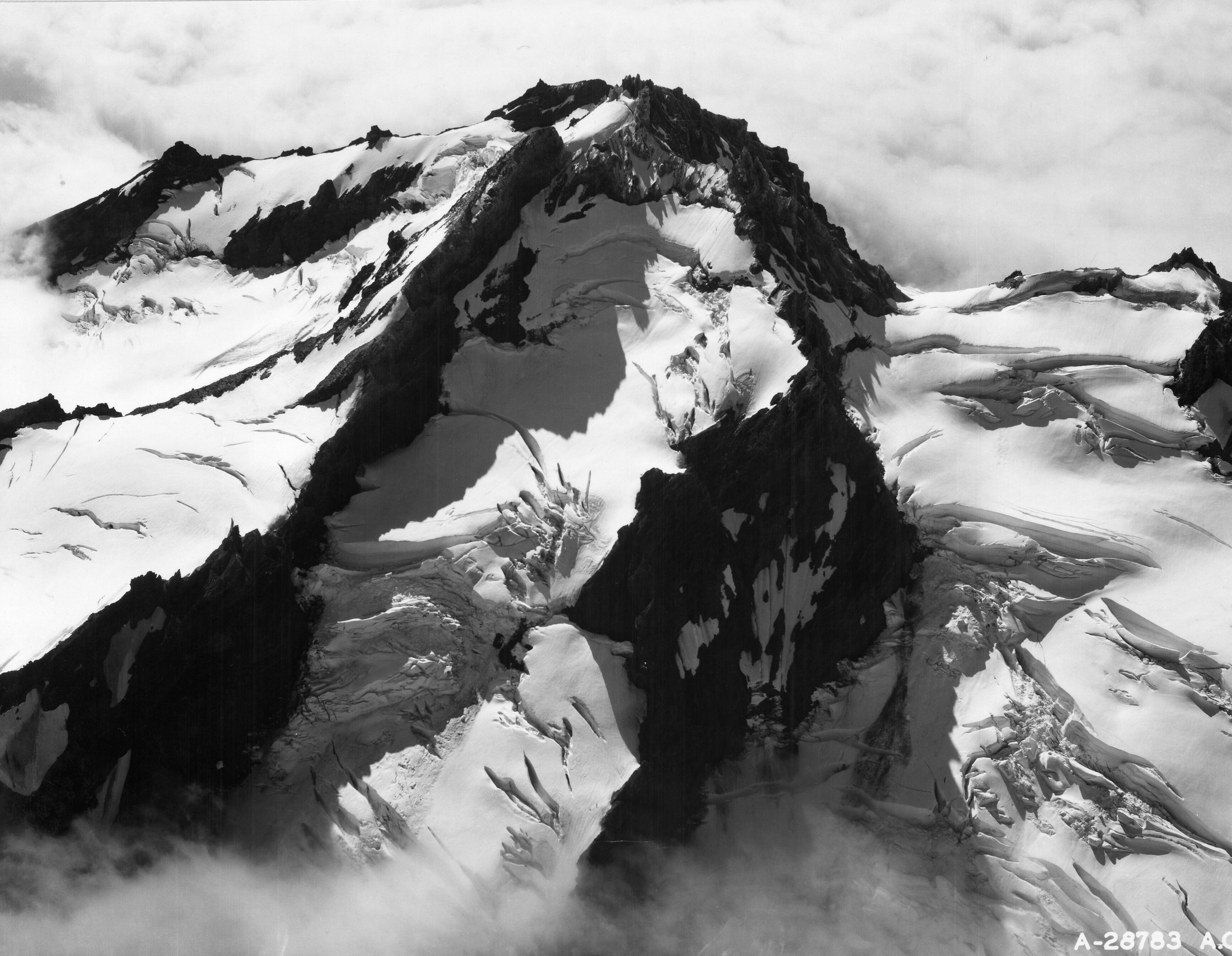

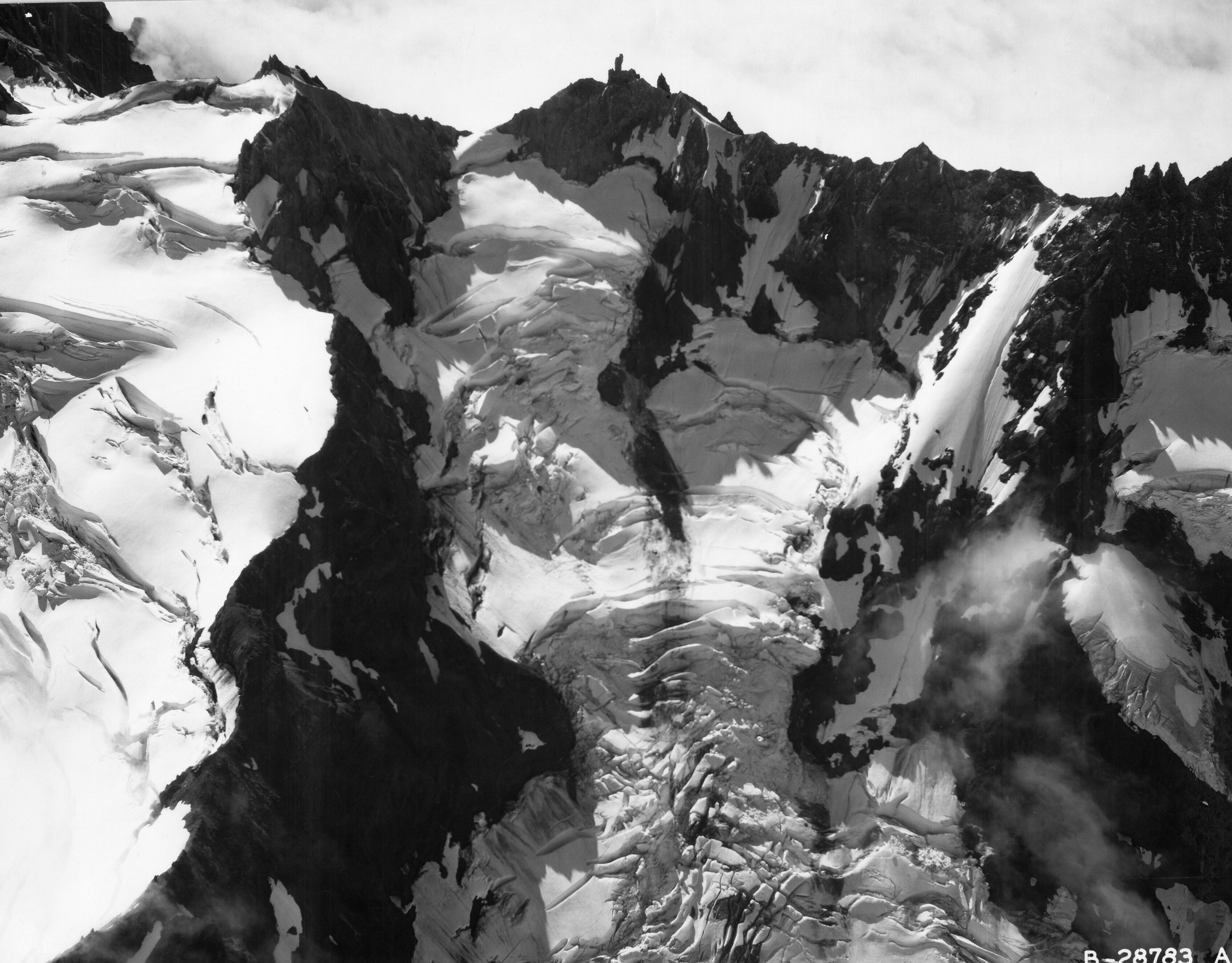
