= Stepovak Bay =

Bay located on the Alaska Peninsula, Alaska

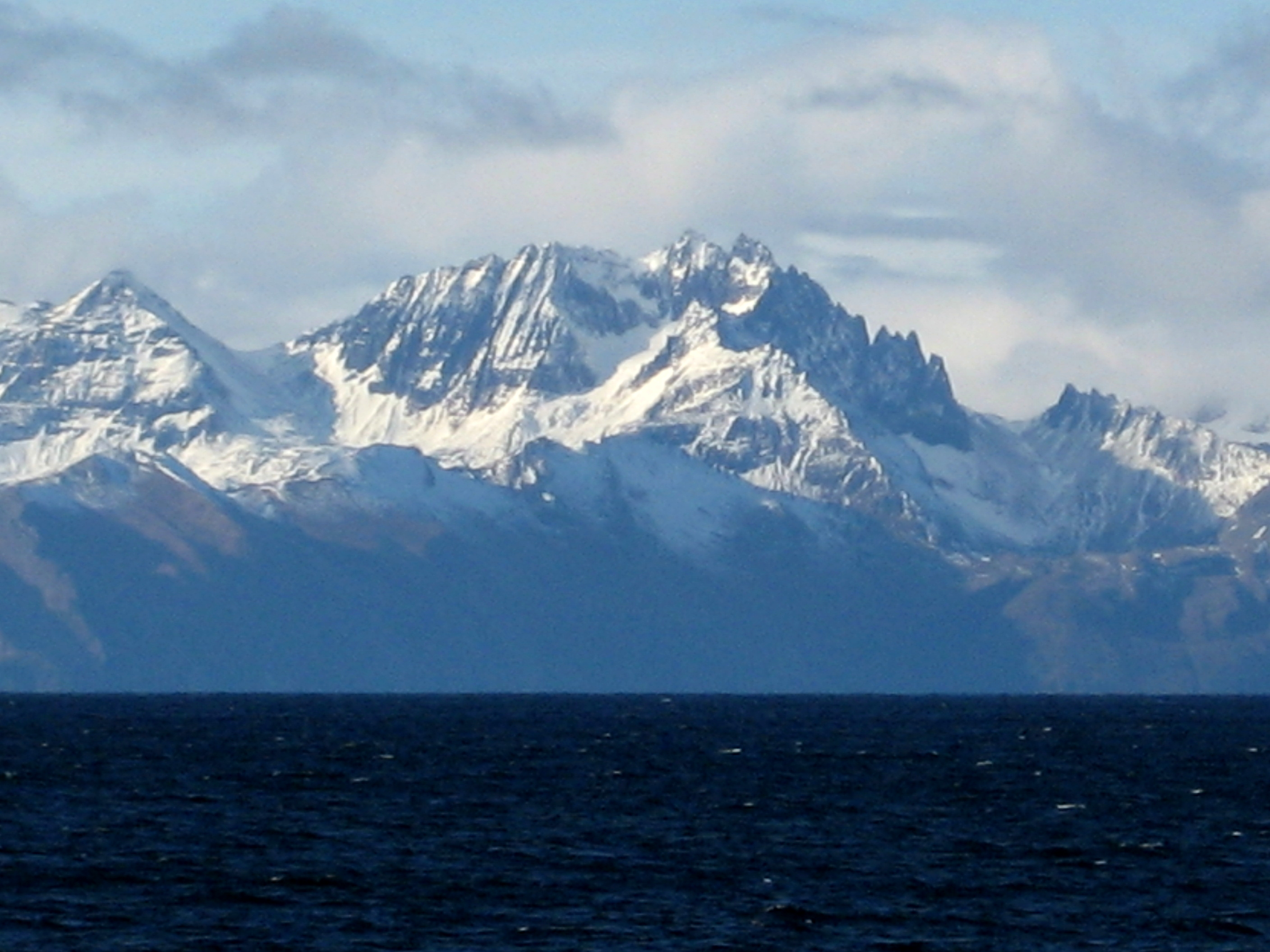
- Mount Stepo across Stepovak Bay

- Location within Alaska
- Coordinates: 55°43′N 159°50′W
- Ocean/sea sources: Pacific Ocean
- Basin countries: U.S.

Stepovak Bay is a bay located on the Alaska Peninsula, Alaska, on the Gulf of Alaska. It was named Stepovakho Bay or Stepof's Bay by the United States Coast and Geodetic Survey in 1888 for Stepanof, a Russian captain.

== Volcanoes ==
Stepovak Bay is framed by the Stepovak Bay group of volcanoes, a chain of 5 cinder cone volcanoes in the Aleutian Arc. The volcanoes include Mount Kupreanof and four numbered volcanoes (Stepovak Bay 1, 2, 3, & 4). Mount Kupreanof and Stepovak Bay 2 and 4 erupted within the last 10,000 years, while Stepovak Bay 1 and 3 erupted before this, sometime in the Late Pleistocene. Mount Kupreanof's most recent eruption was possibly in March 1987.
