= Mount Kukak =

Mountain in Alaska, United States

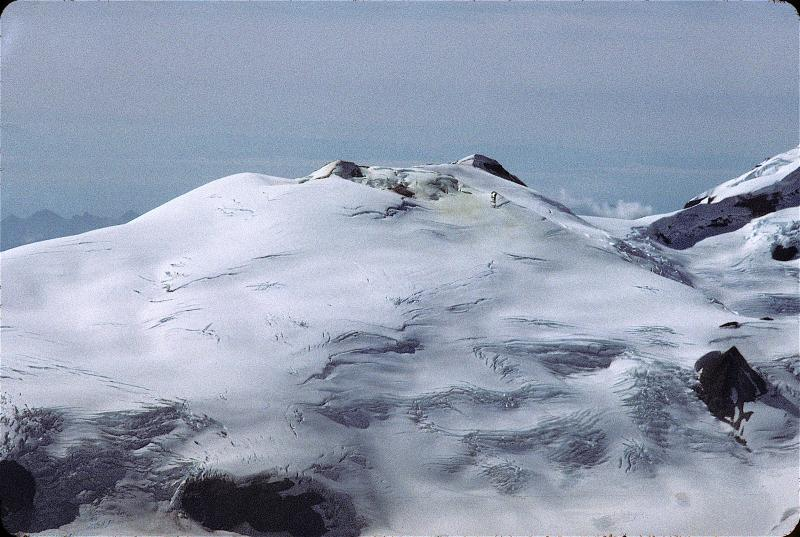
- Fumarolic activity at Kukak volcano in August 2003

Highest point
- Elevation: 6,703 ft (2,043 m)
- Listing: List of volcanoes in the United States
- Coordinates: 58°27′10″N 154°21′18″W

Geography
- Location within Alaska
- Location: Alaska Peninsula, Alaska, United States

Geology
- Formed by: Subduction zone volcanism
- Mountain type: Stratovolcano
- Volcanic arc: Aleutian Arc
- Last eruption: Unknown

Mount Kukak is an almost completely ice-covered stratovolcano on the Alaska Peninsula of Alaska, United States. Although the last eruption from Mount Kukak is unknown, it displays vigorous fumarolic activity.
