= Ugashik-Peulik =

Alaskan volcanic complex

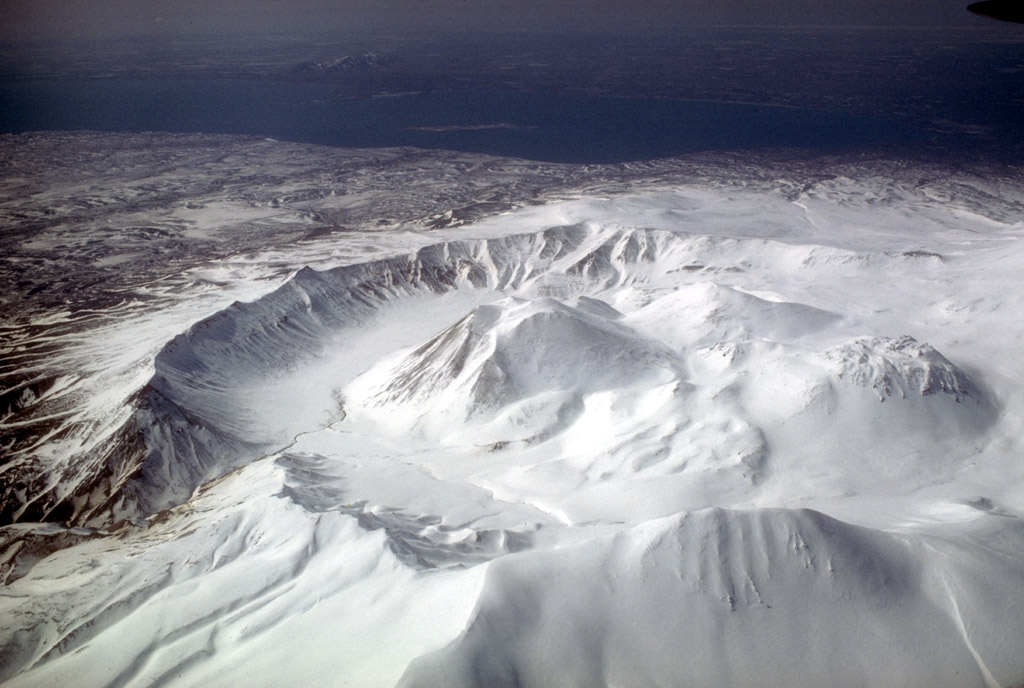
- Aerial view, looking southwest, of Ugashik Caldera located adjacent to Mount Peulik.

Highest point
- Elevation: 4,836 ft (1,474 m)
- Coordinates: 57°45′04″N 156°22′05″W

Geography
- Location within Alaska
- Interactive map of Ugashik-Peulik
- Location: Lake and Peninsula Borough, Alaska, U.S.
- Parent range: Aleutian Range
- Topo map: USGS

Geology
- Formed by: Subduction zone volcanism
- Mountain type(s): Stratovolcano and caldera complex
- Volcanic arc: Aleutian Arc
- Last eruption: 1852 (questionable)

Ugashik-Peulik is a volcanic complex in the U.S. state of Alaska, which includes the stratovolcano of Mount Peulik and the adjacent Ugashik caldera. It is located to the south of Becharof Lake in Lake and Peninsula Borough on the Alaska Peninsula. It is part of the Aleutian Range.

There are reports of eruptions at the complex in 1814 and 1852, but both are questionable.

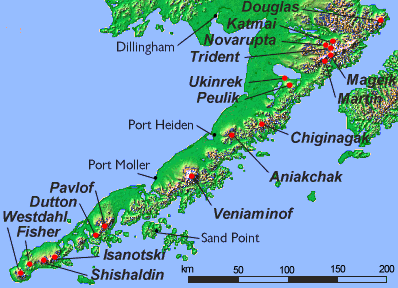
Map showing volcanoes of Alaska
