= Snowy Mountain (Alaska Peninsula) =

Mountain in Alaska, United States

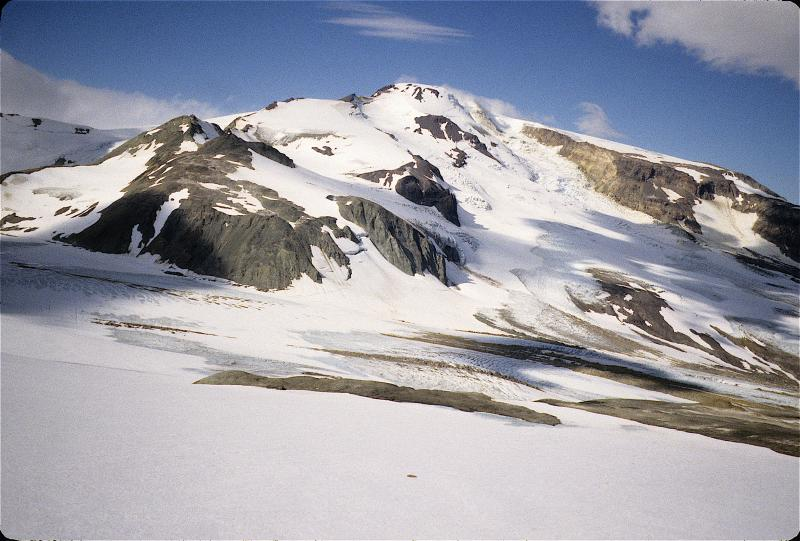
- Snowy Mountain in August 2003

Highest point
- Elevation: 7,093 ft (2,162 m)
- Listing: Volcanoes in the United States
- Coordinates: 58°20′10″N 154°40′55″W

Geography
- Location within Alaska
- Location: Alaska Peninsula, Alaska, United States
- Parent range: Aleutian Range

Geology
- Formed by: Subduction zone volcanism
- Mountain type: Stratovolcano
- Volcanic arc: Aleutian Arc
- Last eruption: 1710 ± 200 years

Snowy Mountain is a stratovolcano on the Alaska Peninsula of Alaska, United States. It was named by the National Geographic Society in 1919 because of the extensive glaciers nearby.
