= Mount Griggs =

Stratovolcano in the state of Alaska

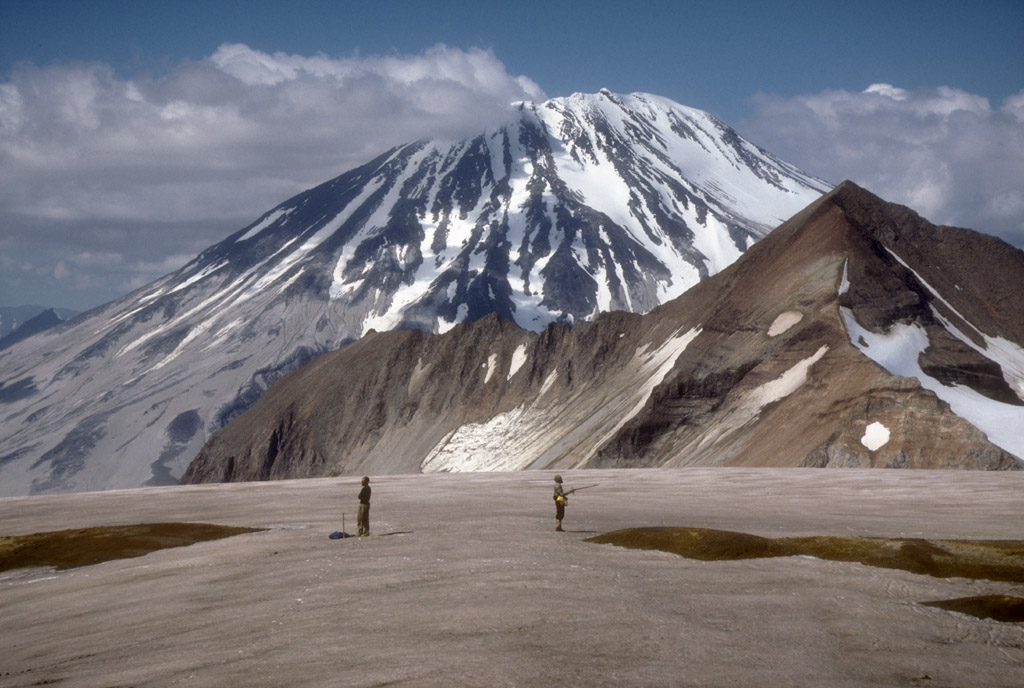
- NW view from west rim of Katmai caldera, July 1990

Highest point
- Elevation: 7,602 ft (2,317 m)
- Prominence: 7,300 ft (2,200 m)
- Listing: North America prominent 60th; North America isolated 91st
- Coordinates: 58°21′26″N 155°06′13″W

Geography
- Location within Alaska
- Location: Katmai National Park and Preserve, Lake and Peninsula Borough, Alaska, U.S.
- Parent range: Aleutian Range
- Topo map: USGS Mount Katmai B-4

Geology
- Formed by: Subduction zone volcanism
- Mountain type: Stratovolcano
- Volcanic arc: Aleutian Arc
- Last eruption: 1790 BCE ± 40 years

Mount Griggs, formerly known as Knife Peak Volcano, is a stratovolcano, which lies 10 km behind the volcanic arc defined by other Katmai group volcanoes. Although no historic eruptions have been reported from Mount Griggs, vigorously active fumaroles persist in a summit crater and along the upper southwest flank. The fumaroles on the southwest flank are the hottest, and some of the flank fumaroles can roar so loudly that they can be heard from the valley floor. The slopes of Mount Griggs are heavily mantled by fallout from the 1912 eruption of Novarupta volcano. The summit consists of three concentric craters, the lowest and largest of which contains a recent summit cone topped by two craters. The volume of the volcanic edifice is estimated at 25 cubic kilometers (6.0 cu mi). Isotopic analysis indicates that the source of Griggs' magma is distinct from the other Katmai volcanoes.

The mountain was named for Dr. Robert Fiske Griggs (1881–1962), botanist, whose explorations of the area, after the eruption of Mount Katmai in 1912, led to the creation of Katmai National Monument by President Woodrow Wilson in 1918.

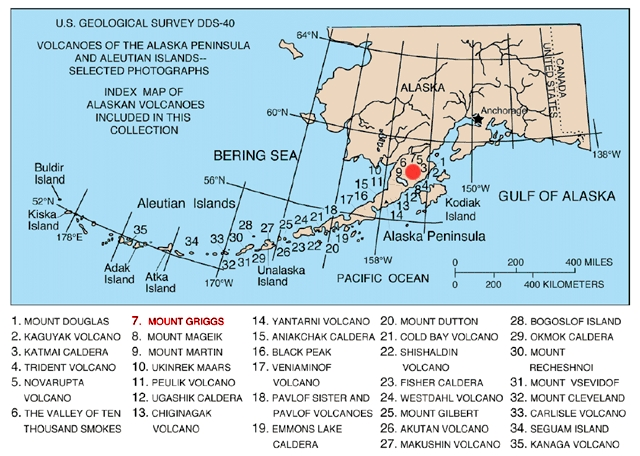
Map showing volcanoes of Alaska with the mark set at the location of Mount Griggs

== See also ==
- List of mountain peaks of North America
  - List of mountain peaks of the United States
    - List of mountain peaks of Alaska
- List of Ultras of the United States
- List of volcanoes in the United States
