= Mount Kupreanof =

Mountain in Alaska, United States

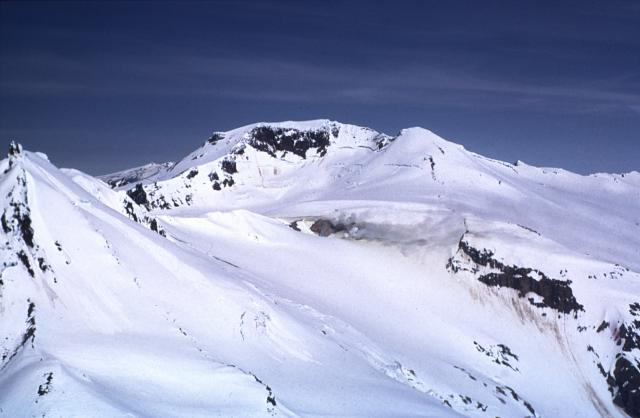
- Steam plumes (center) rising from a prominent fumarole on the upper south-southwest flanks of Mount Kupreanof.

Highest point
- Elevation: 1,895 m (6,217 ft)
- Listing: List of volcanoes in the United States
- Coordinates: 56.11°N 159.797°W

Geography
- Location: Lake and Peninsula Borough, Alaska, United States

Geology
- Formed by: Subduction zone volcanism
- Mountain type: Stratovolcano
- Volcanic arc: Aleutian Arc
- Last eruption: March 10, 1987 (questionable)

Mount Kupreanof is a stratovolcano on the Alaska Peninsula, United States. It is the largest and the northeasternmost in a group of five volcanoes opposite from Stepovak Bay. Mount Kupreanof displays extremely strong fumarole activity and its latest eruption in 1987 produced minor steam and ash emission. This is the only known historical eruption from Mount Kupreanof, although the event is considered questionable according to sources.
