= Trident Volcano =

Stratovolcano in Alaska, United States

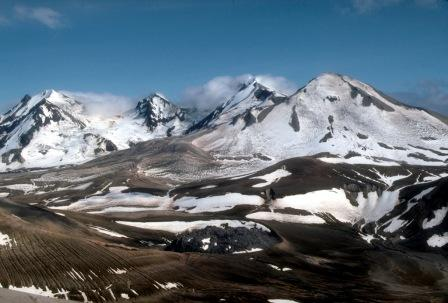
- Multiple peaks of Trident Volcano, from the top of Baked Mountain, Valley of Ten Thousand Smokes.

Highest point
- Elevation: 6,115 ft (1,864 m)
- Coordinates: 58°14′06″N 155°06′13″W

Geography
- Location within Alaska
- Interactive map of Trident Volcano
- Location: Katmai National Park and Preserve, Alaska, U.S.
- Parent range: Aleutian Range
- Topo map: USGS Mount Katmai A-4

Geology
- Formed by: Subduction zone volcanism
- Mountain type: Stratovolcano
- Volcanic arc: Aleutian Arc
- Last eruption: July 1974

Trident Volcano is an eroded volcanic complex on the Alaska Peninsula in Katmai National Park, Alaska. Up to 23 domes comprise the complex stratovolcano, with the greatest elevation of 6,115 feet (1,864 m). The most recent major activity produced a 3,599-foot (1,097 m) dome in an amphitheater on the southwest flank of the southwest peak. Volcano Novarupta formed on its slopes in the largest volcanic eruption of the 20th century.

According to the United States Geological Survey, the descriptive name, Trident, was given by Robert Fiske Griggs of the National Geographic Society, in 1916, because there were three major peaks. The volcano has been known by several variants of the name. The feature was officially named Mount Trident by the United States Board on Geographic Names in 1928. The board assigned the current name in 1968.

== Historical volcanic activity ==
There is no evidence of recent eruptive activity at the summit of Trident, nor have there been any reports of historical activity, except fumarolic activity on the east side. The earliest known activity was minor eruptions in 1913, 1949 and 1950. A satellite cone formed February 15, 1953 on the southwest flank of Trident following a major explosive eruption that sent ash to an altitude of over 5.6 miles (9.0 km). A succession of blocky lava flows were erupted in 1954, 1957, 1958, 1959-1960 from the new vent. Ash eruptions, some to altitudes over 7.5 miles (12 km), were associated with several of the lava eruptions. By 1960, the dome had grown nearly 853 feet (260 m) high and a sequence of viscous flows, up to 984 feet (300 m) thick and covering an area of about 1,200 acres (5 km^{2}) south of the volcano, had been extruded. Further explosions were reported in the early to late 1960s. Lava extrusion, accompanied by explosions, was also reported from 1966 to 1968 and 1974 to 1975. In 1983, steam and/or vapor continued to rise from the central vent area of the new cone as well as from numerous fumaroles on the near-vent portion of the blocky lava flows.

== Composition ==
Trident lavas are andesitic to dacitic in composition. The dominant phenocrysts are zoned plagioclase, hypersthene, calcic clinopyroxene, titanomagnetite, and rimmed olivine. The five flows which erupted from the new vent during the period from 1953 to 1963 are olivine-bearing, two pyroxene, high-silica andesite.

== Gallery ==
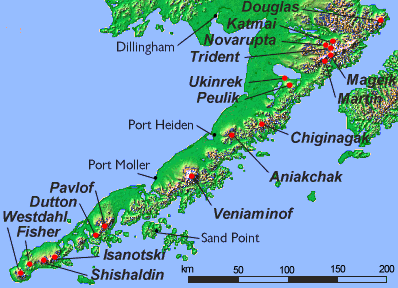
Map showing volcanoes of Alaska Peninsula

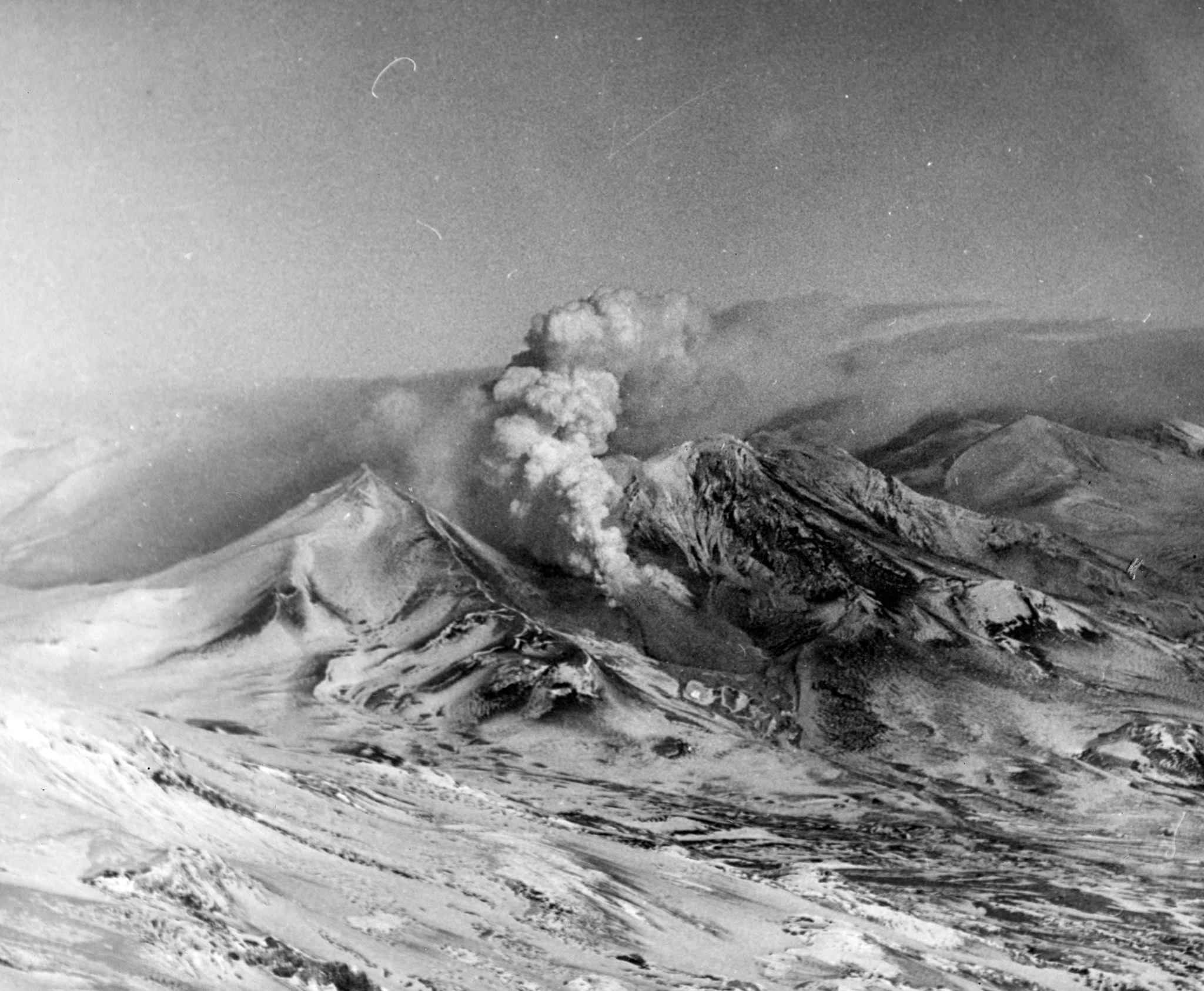
1953 eruption
