= Aleutian Arc =

Volcanic arc in Alaska, United States

Coordinates: 52.28°N 174.15°W

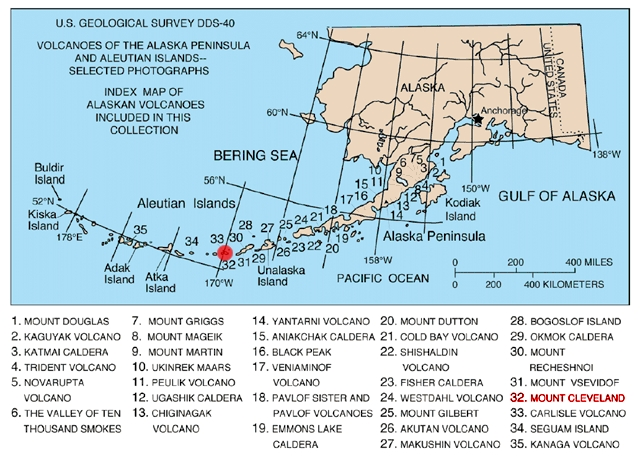
Map showing the volcanoes and islands of the Aleutian Arc.

The Aleutian Arc is a large volcanic arc in the U.S. state of Alaska. It consists of a number of active and dormant volcanoes that have formed as a result of the subduction of the Pacific plate beneath the North American plate along the Aleutian Trench. Although taking its name from the Aleutian Islands, this term is a geologic grouping rather than a geographic one. The Aleutian Arc extends through the Alaska Peninsula following the Aleutian Range through the Aleutian Islands. The arc makes up a sizable portion of the Pacific Ring of Fire, and is known for generating many strong magnitude earthquakes (magnitude 6–6.7) as well as its volcanism.

== Formation and geologic features ==
=== Formation ===
The Aleutian Arc reflects subduction of the Pacific plate beneath the North American plate. It extends 3,000 km (1,900 mi) from the Kamchatka Peninsula in the west to the Gulf of Alaska in the east. The arc was formed around 55 million years ago during the early Eocene period. Unimak Pass at the southwestern end of the Alaska Peninsula (~165°W) marks the eastward transition from an intra-oceanic in the west to a continental arc in the east. Volcanic activity on the Aleutian Ridge extends from the Southwest corner of Alaska to around 175°E, west of Attu Island (~173°E). The Aleutian Arc is distinct in that its arc massif is laterally extended and intact, which is unusual for an intra-oceanic arc.

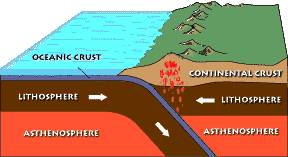
Diagram showing the process of subduction and the formation of volcanic arcs.

=== Geologic features ===
The Aleutian Trench, formed by the subduction of the Pacific plate under the North American plate, sits south of the island arc. A forearc basin reaching depths of 7 km occupies the space between the trench and the island arc and leads up to the Aleutian Ridge, the north side of which being the area where the most volcanic activity occurs. The Aleutian Ridge is largest near tip of the Alaskan Peninsula (160–225 km wide, 25–35 km thick) and decreases in width (80 km wide near the Komandorski Islands) as it extends west towards the Kamchatka Peninsula. Due to the arcuate geometry of the trench, the relative velocity vector changes from almost trench-normal in the Gulf of Alaska to almost trench-parallel in the west. Along the oceanic part of the subduction zone, convergence varies from 6.3 cm (2.5 in) per year to the north-northwest in the east to 7.4 cm (2.9 in) per year towards the northwest in the west. The eastern Aleutians see an orthogonal direction of convergence relative to the trench, while the more central area sees an oblique direction of convergence relative to the trench. Past Attu Island, the direction of convergence becomes parallel with the trench.

== Seismic activity ==
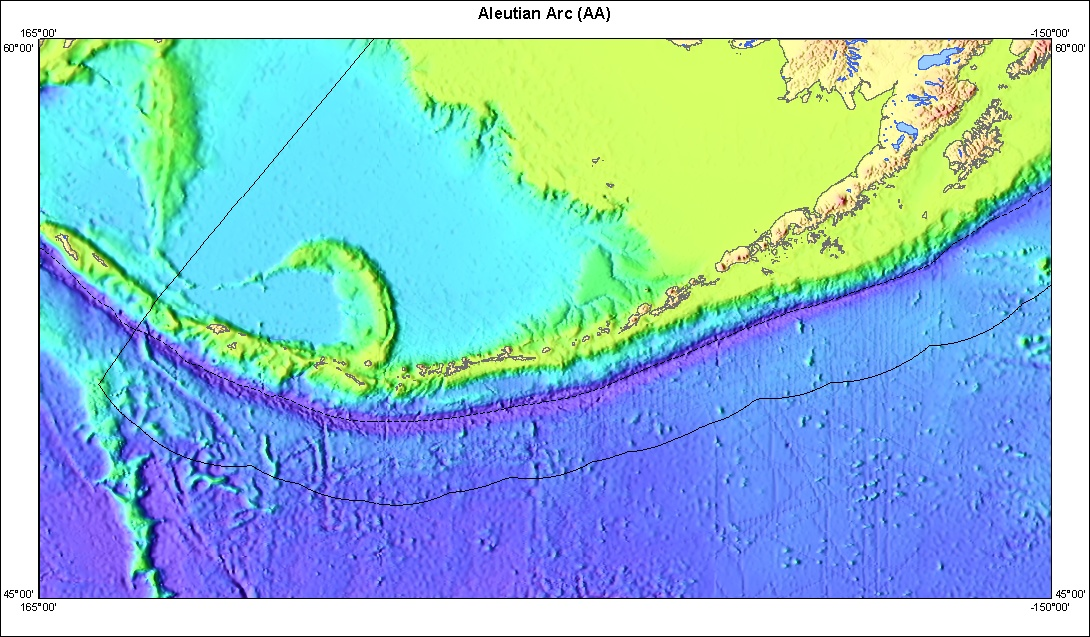
Image showing the Aleutian Island Arc, along with the trench. The trench is denoted by the dark blue line to the south running parallel with the island arc. The area between the trench and the ridge delineates the blocks of crust that cause much of the seismic activity in the region.

=== Tectonic activity ===
The Pacific plate is continuously converging and moving against the North American plate at a rate of 48 mm/year eastward and 78 mm/year westward. The oblique direction of convergence in the western and central portions of the area is causing westward transportation of the arc. This movement of the Pacific plate relative to the North American plate in the central and west Aleutian Arc also causes portions of the forearc to break off and form rotating crustal blocks between the trench and the island arc. The boundaries of the 5 major blocks that have been identified form areas with cohesive movement that are often disrupted by strike-slip and normal faults. Submarine canyons are present at the boundaries between the blocks due to the clockwise rotation of each block cutting into the surface of the other crustal blocks.

=== Earthquakes ===
Thousands of earthquakes per year are seen in this region due to the constant tectonic activity, making the Aleutian islands the most seismically active area in the United States of America. Faulting within the subduction zone (Aleutian Megathrust) as well as within the subducting and overriding plates themselves accounts for the majority of earthquakes that occur. Some smaller magnitude earthquakes are also caused by the volcanic activity of the Aleutian Arc. The regionality of the earthquakes makes it possible for inter-plate and intra-plate events to be differentiated. The majority of events have been noted as having a thrusting mechanism, which denotes them as earthquakes occurring from the interface of a plate. Strike-slip and normal faulting does occur in shallow events, where the depth of the event is less than 30 km deep. Events with a normal fault mechanism tend to occur where the Pacific plate bends as it forms the Aleutian Trench, whereas strike-slip mechanisms are concentrated inland along the axis of the islands themselves.

The constant activity near the Aleutian Arc has resulted in an area prone to high magnitude earthquakes. One major earthquake (Mw ≥ 8) occurs every 13 years on average, and strong magnitude earthquakes (Mw 6–7) occur an average of six times per year. The rapid conversion and the gentle subduction angle of the Pacific plate under the North American plate also caused a back-arc region of tectonic deformation that spans 700 km from the Aleutian Arc into the interior of Alaska to form. These conditions have allowed for a multitude of major earthquakes to be measured throughout Alaska's history. Most major earthquakes measured in the region tend to be caused by ruptures in the gentle subduction interface between the subducting and overriding plates.

== Volcanoes ==
Volcanoes within this arc include:

- Mount Adagdak
- Mount Akutan
- Mount Amak
- Mount Amukta
- Mount Aniakchak
- Augustine Volcano
- Black Peak
- Bogoslof Island
- Mount Carlisle
- Mount Chiginagak
- Cleveland Volcano
- Cold Bay Volcano
- Mount Dana
- Davidof Volcano
- Mount Denison
- Devils Desk
- Mount Douglas
- Mount Dutton
- Eickelberg Peak
- Mount Emmons
- Fourpeaked Mountain
- Mount Frosty
- Gareloi Volcano
- Great Sitkin
- Mount Gilbert
- Mount Griggs
- Hayes Volcano
- Mount Iliamna
- Isanotski Peaks
- Mount Kaguyak
- Mount Kanaga
- Kasatochi Island
- Mount Katmai
- Mount Kialagvik
- Kiska
- Korovin Volcano
- Mount Kukak
- Mount Kupreanof
- Mount Mageik
- Makushin Volcano
- Mount Martin
- Novarupta
- Mount Okmok
- Mount Pavlof
- Pavlof Sister
- Pogromni Volcano
- Mount Recheshnoi
- Mount Redoubt
- Mount Seguam
- Segula Island
- Semisopochnoi Island
- Mount Shishaldin
- Snowy Mountain
- Mount Spurr
- Mount Steller
- Tanaga
- Trident Volcano
- Ugashik-Peulik
- Mount Veniaminof
- Mount Vsevidof
- Mount Westdahl
- Yantarni Volcano
