= Novarupta =

Volcano in Katmai National Park, Alaska, US

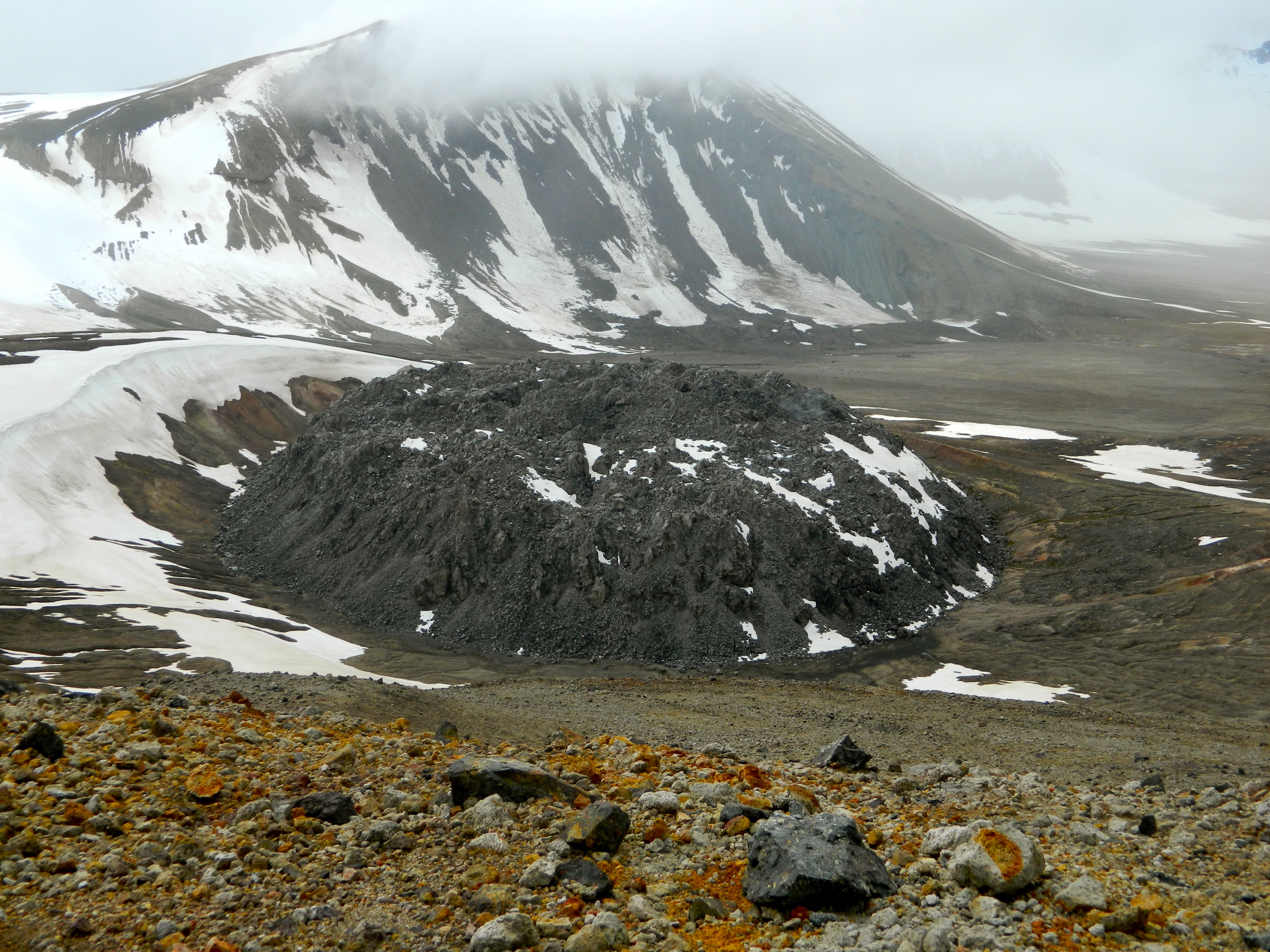
- Novarupta's lava dome in June 2011

Highest point
- Elevation: 2,759 ft (841 m)
- Listing: Volcanoes in the United States
- Coordinates: 58°16′0″N 155°9′24″W

Geography
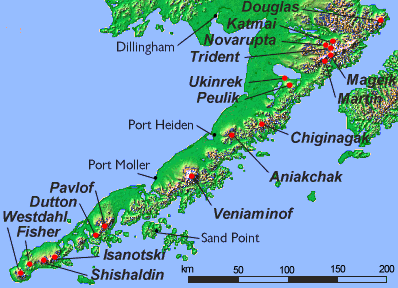
- Map showing volcanoes of the Alaska Peninsula, with Novarupta towards the northeast
- Country: United States
- State: Alaska
- Protected area: Katmai National Park and Preserve
- Parent range: Aleutian Range
- Topo map: USGS Mount Katmai B-4

Geology
- Formed by: Subduction zone volcanism
- Mountain type: Caldera with lava dome
- Volcanic arc: Aleutian Arc
- Last eruption: June to October 1912

Novarupta (Note: Novarupta has been translated from Latin to multiple English meanings, including "newly erupted", "new eruption", "new break", and "new vent".) is a volcano located on the Alaska Peninsula on a slope of Trident Volcano in Katmai National Park and Preserve, about 290 miles (470 km) southwest of Anchorage. Novarupta was formed in 1912, during the largest volcanic eruption of the 20th century, in which it released 30 times the volume of magma of the 1980 eruption of Mount St. Helens.

== Eruption of 1912 ==
1912 eruption of Novarupta
- Volcano: Novarupta
- Start date: June 6, 1912
- Type: Ultra Plinian
- Location: Aleutian Range, Alaska; 58°16′0″N 155°9′24″W
- VEI: 6

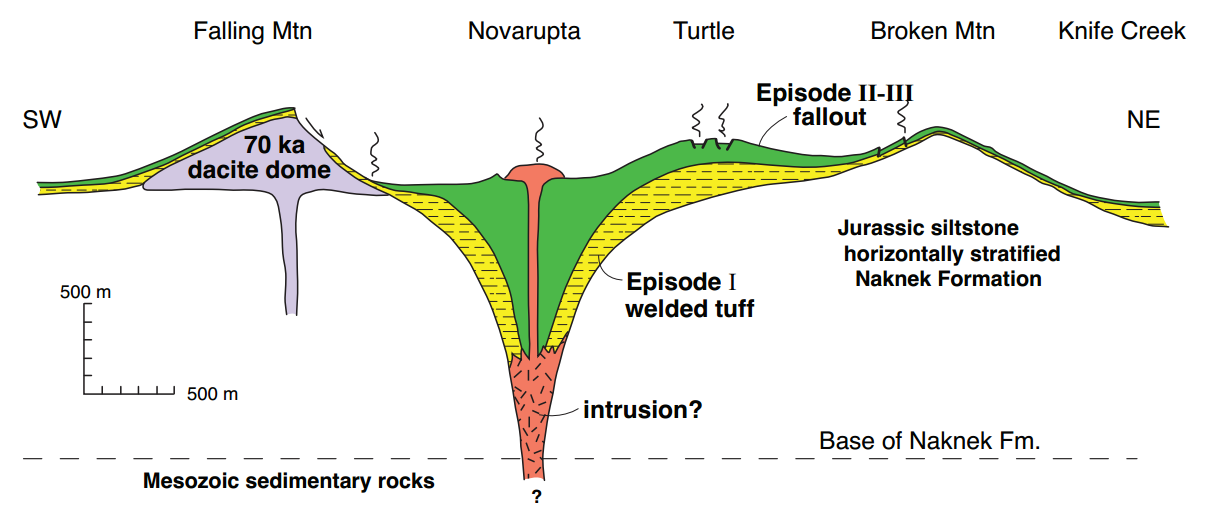
Novarupta geologic cross section

The 1912 eruption that formed Novarupta was the largest to occur during the 20th century. It began on June 6, 1912, and culminated in a series of violent eruptions. Rated a 6 on the volcanic explosivity index, the 60-hour-long eruption expelled 3.1 to 3.6 cubic miles (13 to 15 km^{3}) of ash, thirty times as much as the 1980 eruption of Mount St. Helens. The erupted magma of rhyolite, dacite, and andesite resulted in more than 4.1 cubic miles (17 km^{3}) of air fall tuff and approximately 2.6 cubic miles (11 km^{3}) of pyroclastic ash-flow tuff. During the 20th century, only the 1991 eruption of Mount Pinatubo in the Philippines and the 1902 eruption of Santa María in Guatemala were of comparable magnitude; Mount Pinatubo ejected 2.6 cubic miles (11 km^{3}) of tephra, and Santa María just slightly less.

The Novarupta eruption occurred about 6.59 mi (10.61 km) from the peak of Mount Katmai Volcano and 4,000 ft (1,200 m) below the post-eruption Mount Katmai summit. During the eruption a large quantity of magma erupted from beneath the Mount Katmai area, resulting in the formation of a 1.2-mile (2 km) wide, funnel-shaped vent and the collapse of Mount Katmai's summit, creating a 2,000-foot (600 m) deep, 1.9 by 2.5 mi (3 by 4 km) caldera.

The eruption ended with the extrusion of a lava dome of rhyolite that plugged the vent. The 295-foot (90 m) high and 1,180-foot (360 m) wide dome it created forms what is now referred to as Novarupta.

Despite the magnitude of the eruption, no deaths directly resulted. Eyewitness accounts from people located downwind in the path of a thick ash cloud described the gradual lowering of visibility to next to nothing. Ash threatened to contaminate drinking water and destroy food resources, but the Alaska Natives were aided in their survival by traditional knowledge passed down through generations from previous eruptions. However, the Native villages experiencing the heaviest ash falls were abandoned and the inhabitants relocated.

== Valley of Ten Thousand Smokes ==
Pyroclastic flows from the eruption formed the Valley of Ten Thousand Smokes, named by botanist Robert F. Griggs, who explored the volcano's aftermath for the National Geographic Society in 1916.

The eruption that formed the Valley of Ten Thousand Smokes is one of the few in recorded history to have produced welded tuff, resulting in numerous fumaroles that persisted for 15 years.

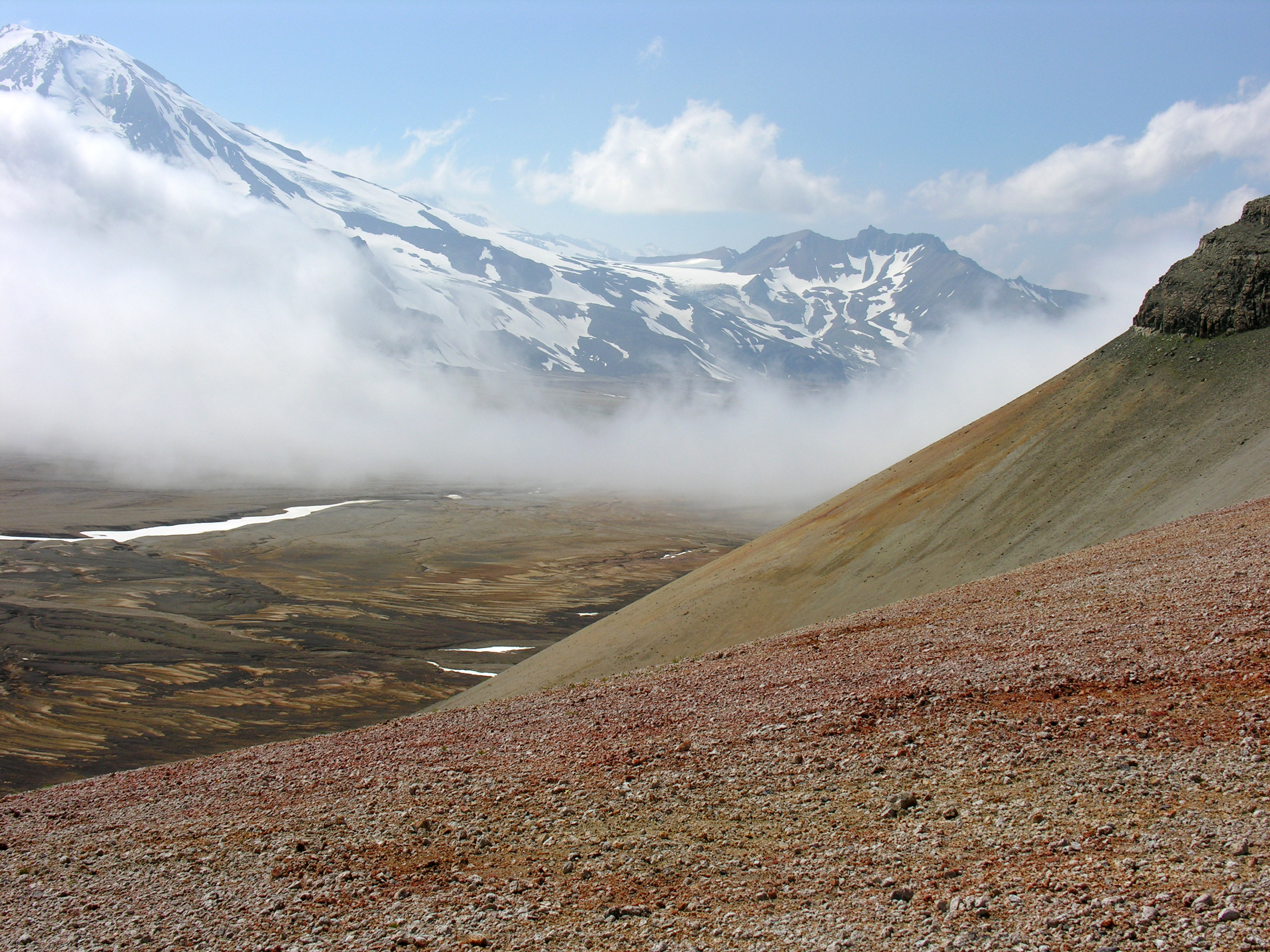
Colorful ash in the Valley of Ten Thousand Smokes

== Katmai National Park ==
Established as a National Park & Preserve in 1980, Katmai is located on the Alaska Peninsula, across from Kodiak Island, with headquarters in nearby King Salmon, about 290 mi (470 km) southwest of Anchorage. The area was originally designated a National Monument in 1918 to protect the area around the 1912 eruption of Novarupta and the 40-square-mile (104 km^{2}), 100-to-700-foot (30 to 210 m) deep, pyroclastic flow of the Valley of Ten Thousand Smokes.

== See also ==
- Parícutin, a cinder cone volcano in Mexico whose emergence could be fully observed.
- Timeline of volcanism on Earth
