= Aleutian Range =

Mountain range in Alaska, United States

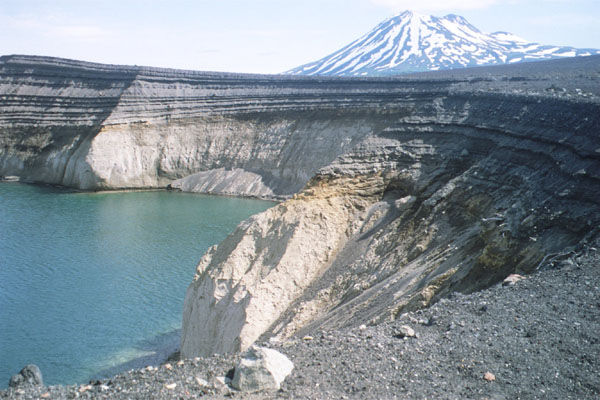
- Alaska Peninsula, Peulik Volcano and Ukinrek Maars

Highest point
- Peak: Mount Redoubt
- Elevation: 10,197 ft (3,108 m)
- Coordinates: 60°29′07″N 152°44′35″W

Dimensions
- Length: 600 mi (970 km)

Geography
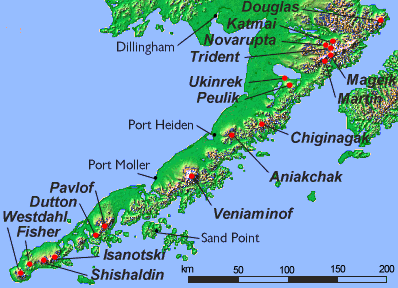
- Map showing volcanoes on the Alaska Peninsula
- Country: United States
- State: Alaska
- Range coordinates: 57°4′N 156°59.3′W
- Borders on: Tordrillo Mountains

The Aleutian Range is a major mountain range located in southwest Alaska. It extends from Chakachamna Lake (80 miles/130 km southwest of Anchorage) to Unimak Island, which is at the tip of the Alaska Peninsula. It includes all of the mountains of the Peninsula. The Aleutian Range is special because of its large number of active volcanoes, which are also part of the larger Aleutian Arc. The mainland part of the range is about 600 miles (1000 km) long. The Aleutian Islands are (geologically) a partially submerged western extension of the range that stretches for another 1,600 km (1000 mi). However, the official designation "Aleutian Range" includes only the mainland peaks and the peaks on Unimak Island. The range is almost entirely roadless wilderness. Katmai National Park and Preserve, a large national park within the range, must be reached by boat or plane.

The core Aleutian Range can be divided into three mountain groups. Listed from southwest to northeast, they are:

- Mountains of the Alaska Peninsula and Unimak Island
- Chigmit Mountains
- Neacola Mountains

See Aleutian Islands for the continuation of the range to the west of Unimak Island. Just to the north of the Aleutian Range are the Tordrillo Mountains, the southeasternmost extent of the Alaska Range.

== List of mountains ==
Mountain / Peak	Elevation		Prominence		Coordinates	Location
Mountain / Peak	ft	m	ft	m	Coordinates	Location
Mount Redoubt	10,197	3,108	9,098	2,773	60°29′7″N 152°44′35″W	Chigmit Mountains
Mount Iliamna	10,016	3,053	7,866	2,398	60°1′54″N 153°5′28″W	Chigmit Mountains
Mount Neacola	9,426	2,873	6,326	1,928	60°47′55″N 153°23′38″W	Neacola Mountains
Mount Shishaldin	9,373	2,857	9,413	2,869	54°45′N 163°58′W	Unimak Island
Mount Pavlof	8,264	2,519	8,225	2,507	55°25′10″N 161°53′42″W	Alaska Peninsula
Mount Veniaminof	8,225	2,507	8,199	2,499	56°11′53″N 159°23′27″W	Alaska Peninsula
Isanotski Peaks	8,106	2,471	5,831	1,777	54°46′7″N 163°43′44″W	Unimak Island
Mount Denison	7,606	2,318	1,558	475	58°25′2.39160″N 154°27′2.80426″W	Alaska Peninsula
Mount Griggs	7,602	2,317	7,300	2,200	58°21′14″N 155°5′30″W	Alaska Peninsula
Mount Douglas	7,050	2,150	6,217	1,895	58°51′36″N 153°31′59″W	Alaska Peninsula
Mount Chiginagak	7,001	2,134	6,675	2,035	57°8′1″N 156°59′29″W	Alaska Peninsula
Double Peak	6,735	2,053	4,610	1,410	60°43′46.5424″N 152°35′8.7245″W	Chigmit Mountains
Mount Katmai	6,716	2,047	2,392	729	58°16′44″N 154°57′11″W	Alaska Peninsula
Pogromni Volcano	6,531	1,991			54°34′8″N 164°41′53″W	Unimak Island

== Volcanic eruptions ==
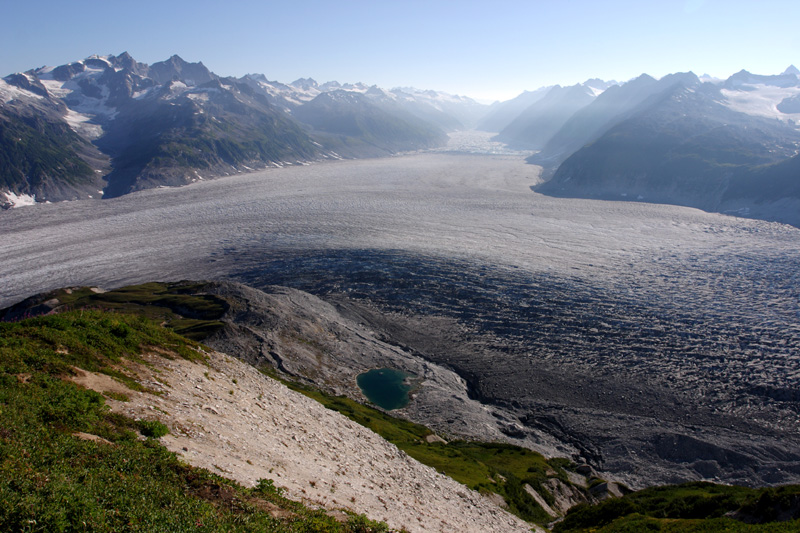
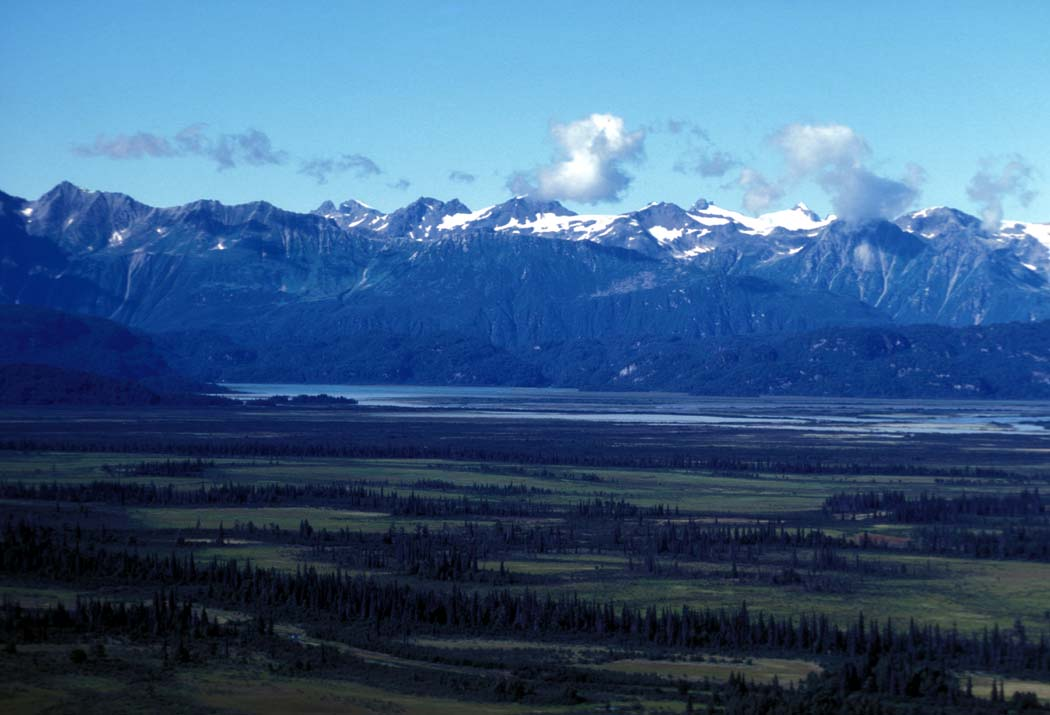
Blockade Glacier in the Neacola Mountains (left) and the Aleutian Range

Two volcanoes erupted during the summer of 2008 on the eastern Aleutian Islands. On July 12, 2008, Mount Okmok erupted, and it continued to erupt for a month. A giant, rapidly moving ash and gas cloud shot up to a height of 15,240 m as a result of this eruption.

Mount Kasatochi was home to the other eruption, which occurred on August 7 and 8. This eruption also sent up a gas cloud about 15,000 high. Together, these two power volcanic eruptions deposited emissions of trace gases an aerosols into the atmosphere. These emissions formed a sulfate aerosol layer that totaled a transfer of 1.6 Tg of SO_{2} into the stratosphere and disturbed flights over this area for a short period following the eruptions.

== Earthquakes ==
The 7.9 Mw Aleutian Islands earthquake occurred in June 2014 at an intermediate depth of 107 km. The quake was caused by oblique normal faulting along the Aleutian Trench, a convergent boundary where the Pacific plate is subducting underneath the North American plate at around 59 mm/year.

== See also ==
- List of earthquakes in Alaska
