= Aleutian subduction zone =

Convergence boundary between the North American Plate and the Pacific Plate

The Aleutian subduction zone is a 2,500 mi (4,000 km) long convergent boundary between the North American Plate and the Pacific Plate, that extends from the Alaska Range to the Kamchatka Peninsula. Here, the Pacific Plate is being subducted underneath the North American Plate and the rate of subduction changes from west to east from 7.5 to 5.1 cm (3.0 to 2.0 in) per year. The Aleutian subduction zone includes two prominent features, the Aleutian Arc and the Aleutian Trench. The Aleutian Arc was created via volcanic eruptions from dehydration of the subducting slab at ~100 km depth. The Aleutian Trench is a narrow and deep morphology that occurs between the two converging plates as the subducting slab dives beneath the overriding plate.

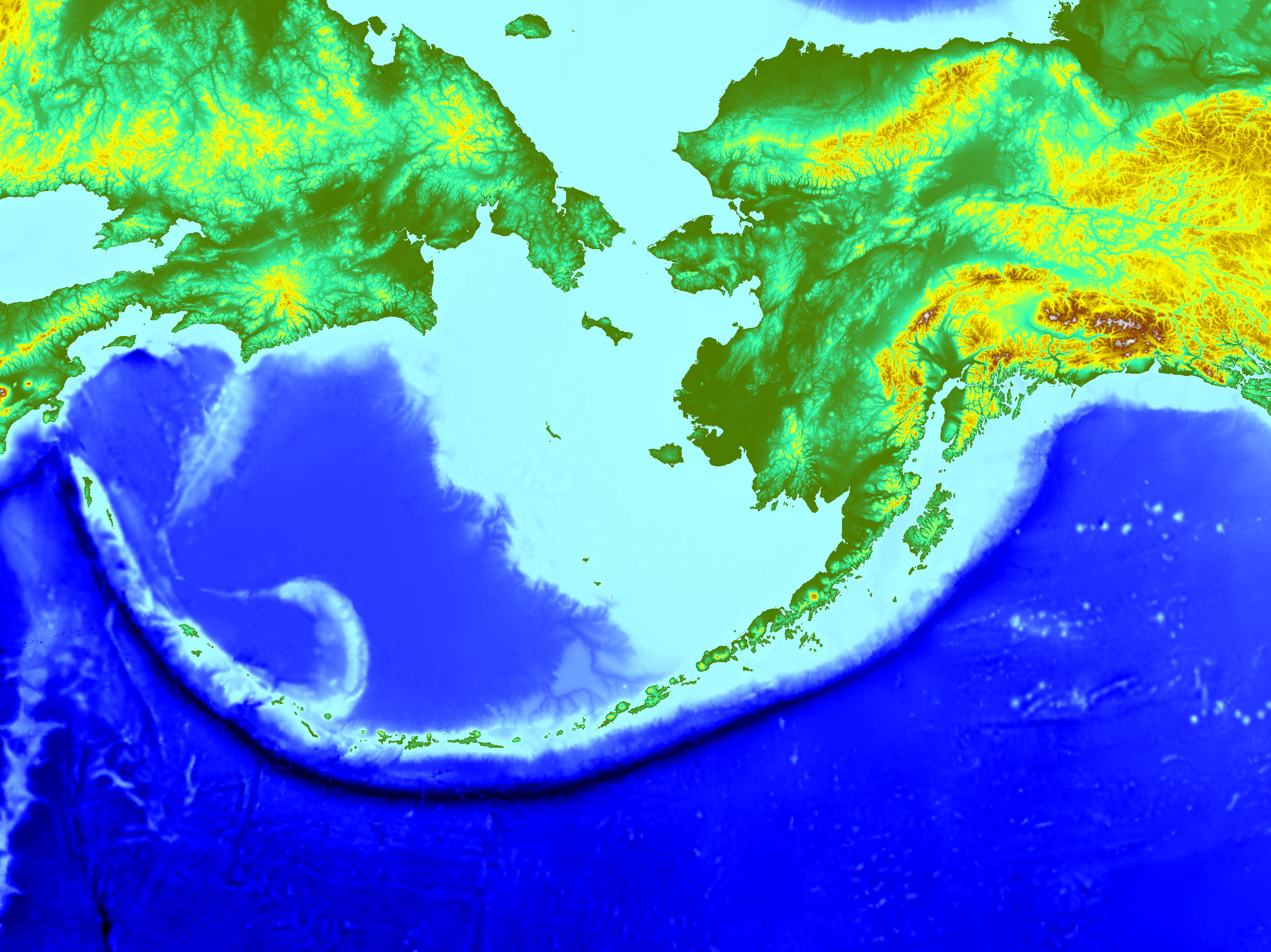
Map of Aleutian Trench

== Geological history ==
The Aleutian island arc formed ~50-55 ma as a result of Kula Plate subduction under the North American Plate before the Pacific plate arrived. There are three stratigraphic units of the Aleutian island arc: volcanic rocks from ~55-33 ma, marine sedimentary rocks from ~23-33 ma, and sedimentary and igneous rocks from ~5 ma-present. Volcanic rocks from ~55-33 ma include sandstone, siltstone, conglomerate, and breccia that are all volcanic, and they are mixed with pillow lavas in a complex way. Debris flows and turbidity currents transported igneous materials from volcanic source to shallow marine basins. The majority of the volcanism occurred between ~ 56-34 ma along the island arcs.

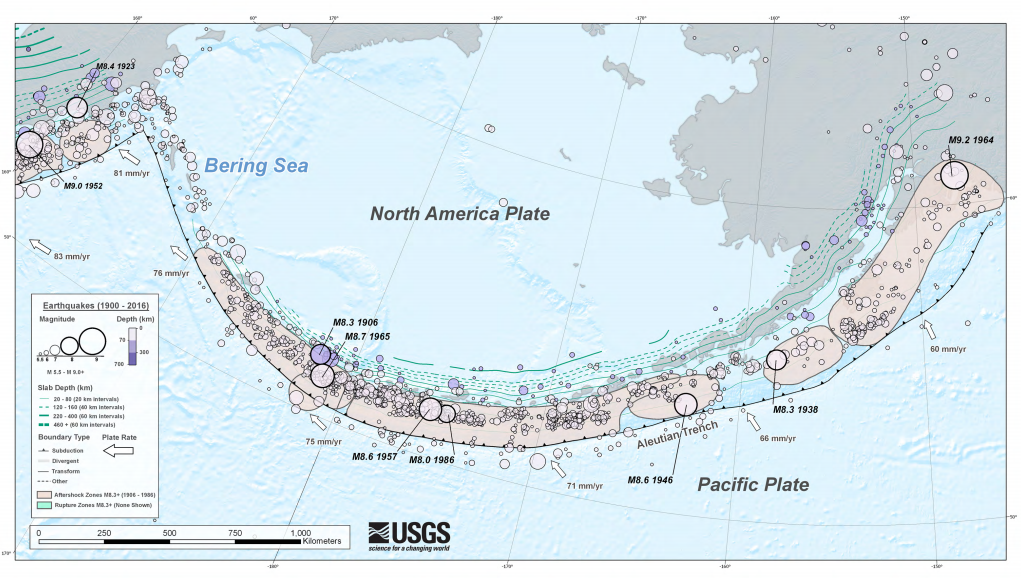
Earthquakes in the Aleutian Subduction Zone

== Island arc ==
The Aleutian island arc crust in Alaska is ~25 km thick, and has a volume of ~2300 km^{3} per kilometer of the arc. Seismic reflection and refraction surveys indicate that the composition of the Aleutian island arc is not similar to the composition of continental crust. Relatively high p-wave velocities indicate mafic rocks are present and this is verified in the geology of the crust. In the upper crust, there is ~6 km of basaltic andesite, while the middle crust is composed of 5 km-thick mid-ocean ridge basalt (MORB), and 19 km- thick tholeiitic residue in the lower crust. Continental crusts usually have silicic upper crust and reflective lower crust, but these features are not found in the Aleutian arc.

== Magmatism ==
There are 40 active volcanoes in the Aleutian volcanic arc from the Mt. Spurr in mainland Alaska to Buldir Island in the far west Aleutian islands. The list of volcanoes in the Aleutian Arc could be found here. The eastern end of the volcanic arc on the Alaska Peninsula lies on Mesozoic sedimentary and volcanic rocks, with trace amounts of Paleozoic rocks intruded by Mesozoic batholiths. Most of the Aleutian Islands are composed of sedimentary rocks from granitic and metamorphic rocks from Oligocene-Miocene. There are Quaternary volcanoes on the north of the Aleutian Islands structural axis, which is composed of andesite mostly, mixed with olivine basalt to rhyolite. The eastern Aleutian volcanoes have more silicic magma while the western Aleutian arcs lack the sial magma.

== Trench ==
=== Formation ===
The Aleutian Trench formation is associated with the subduction of the Pacific Plate beneath the North American plate. The horizontally-curved shape of the trench is due to the change in direction of the North American plate around ~5- 2.6 my, resulting in the movement of the Pacific Plate to the northwest. A hypothesis suggests that the northward movement of the Pacific Plate ended ~66-56 my, and the underthrusting of oceanic crust created the Aleutian trench. And yet other more complicated hypotheses exist.

There are two hypotheses in the mechanism of the trench formation: tensional and compressional. The tensional hypothesis suggests that island arc loading caused the oceanic crust to create downward faulting. In other words, the trench was a part of oceanic crust once, but faulted down at depth due to the loading of island arc. The compressional hypothesis suggests that mantle convection or drag prevented oceanic crust from reaching isostatic equilibrium, because the imbalance was not adjusted in a relatively short amount of time. As a result, deformation and plastic flow of magma released from open fractures on the concave-side of arc, drags the crust and mantle to deeper depths, and further inhibits vertical rise of magma, creating a trench.

=== Sedimentation in eastern Aleutian trench ===
There is a high supply of sediment from turbidity currents, slumps, and creeps into the eastern portion of the Aleutian trench. The sediments accumulated here were originally part of the Alaskan Abyssal Plain. The maximum depth of the trench is 2 km, and the deposition at the maximum depth has been 10 times faster than the abyssal plain. As a result, there is a sediment wedge that is 20–30 km wide and 1 km thick has been created over ~0.6 my. These sediments are mostly Mesozoic in age, characterized by a consolidated trench deposit grading from sandstone, sandstone and shale, to abyssal turbidity sediments. The most recent addition of a high volume of sediment fill is due to Pleistocene glacial erosion.

== Seismicity ==
Most of the major crustal faults found in the overriding Aleutian island arc are pre-Pleistocene, although precise dating has not been achieved.

Along the megathrust, there were 5 earthquakes that were greater than magnitude 8 in the Aleutian subduction zone within the past 80+ years : M= 8.2 Shumagin Islands in 1938, M= 8.6 Andreanof Islands in 1957, M= 9.2 Good Friday in 1964, M= 8.7 Rat Islands in 1965, and M= 8.2 near Perryville in 2021 . Tremor and slow-slip earthquakes have also been observed in the Aleutian subduction zone. The low frequency earthquake (LFE) hypocenters associated with these processes are located near Kodiak Island, Shumagin Gap, Unalaska, and the Andreanof Islands, down-dip of these great megathrust events, where the two converging plates are thought to be at least partially locked. The thickness of sedimentation in the trench does not have a correlation with presence of tremor. For example, there is ~1 km-thick late Quaternary-Holocene sediment underneath Kodiak, and ~ 200 m-thick sediment underneath the Andreanof Islands. Kodiak Island had LFE epicenters at depths of 45–60 km while Andreanof Islands had epicenters at ~60–70 km depths. However, tremor does seem to occur at a specific depth related to the age of the subducting plate. The age of the subducting plate is older towards west (Andreanof Island) where LFEs occur at greater depths (~75 km) than in the east where the plate is younger (~45 km near Kodiak Island). This may be because the depths at which the hydrous minerals release water and produce tremors are greater when the plate is older, colder, and subducting faster.
