= Mount Okmok =

Volcano on eastern Umnak Island in the central-eastern Aleutian Islands of Alaska

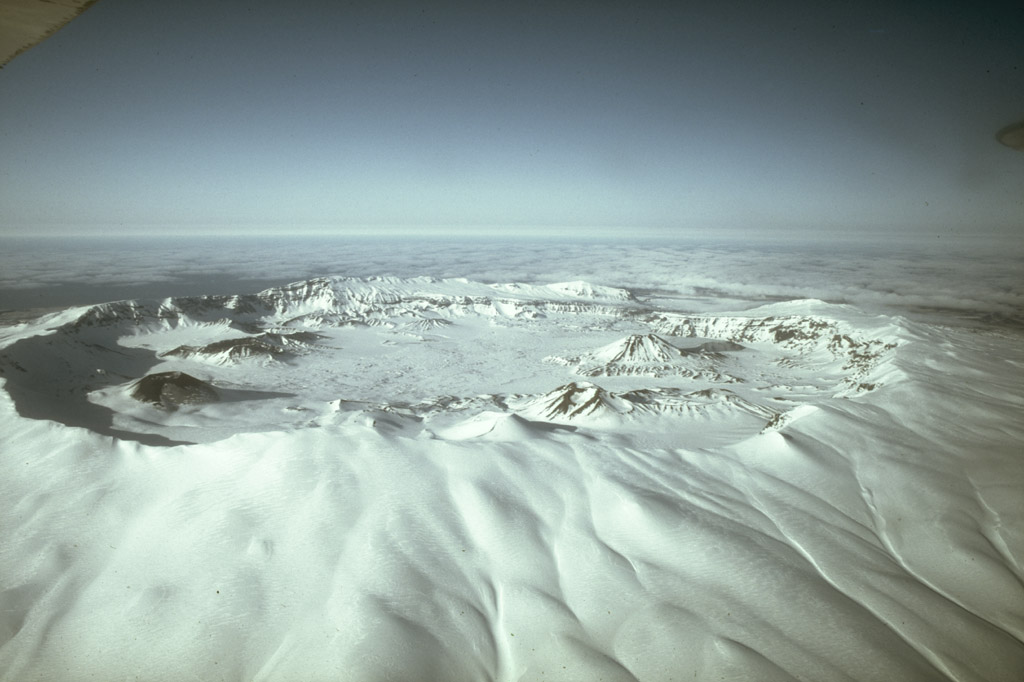
- Aerial view looking across Okmok Caldera.

Highest point
- Elevation: 3,519 ft (1,073 m)
- Coordinates: 53°26′N 168°08′W

Geography
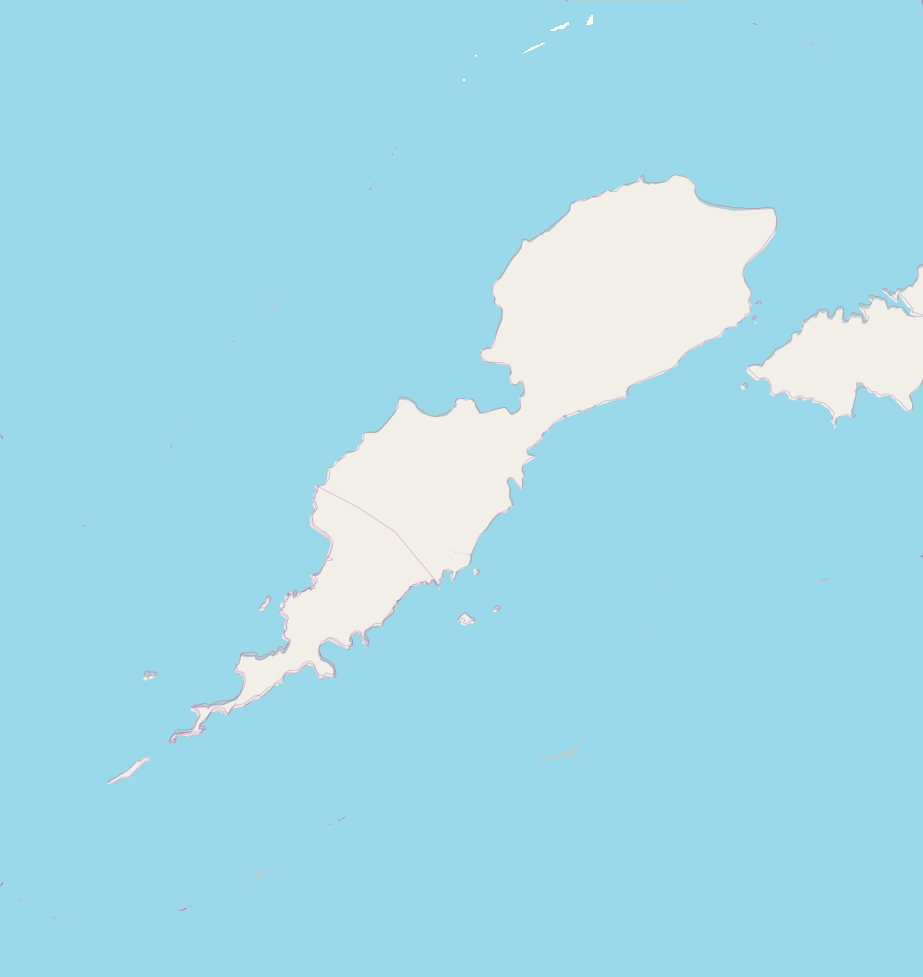
- Location within Umnak Location within Alaska
- Interactive map of Mount Okmok
- Location: Umnak Island, Aleutian Islands, Alaska, US
- Topo map: USGS Umnak B-1

Geology
- Formed by: Subduction zone volcanism
- Mountain type: Shield volcano with nested caldera
- Volcanic arc: Aleutian Arc
- Last eruption: July to August 2008

Mount Okmok is a volcano on eastern Umnak Island, in the central-eastern Aleutian Islands of Alaska. Part of the Aleutian Volcanic Arc, it was formed by the subduction of the oceanic Pacific Plate under the North American Plate. Okmok is a large shield volcano capped by a 10-kilometer (6.2 mi) wide caldera. The caldera contains numerous cinder cones, their lava flows, and a few lakes. Okmok erupts mainly basaltic lava, mostly from the cones within the caldera.

Activity began in the Pleistocene. Two large caldera-forming eruptions took place during the Holocene, with a volcanic explosivity index (VEI) of 6; the second of these occurred in 43 BCE and caused a volcanic winter that might have changed the history of Egypt. After this second caldera-forming eruption a crater lake formed in the caldera, and drained in one of the largest known floods of the Holocene. Okmok is one of the most active volcanoes of North America; numerous eruptions have produced lava flows within the caldera, and the 1817 eruption destroyed an Aleut village.

The last eruption was in 2008 and produced several new vents in the caldera. This eruption, which occurred with little forewarning, yielded a volcanic cloud that produced volcanic ash fall around Okmok. The volcano is monitored by the Alaska Volcano Observatory (AVO).

== Geography and geomorphology ==
Okmok is on northeastern Umnak Island, a remote location in the central Aleutian Islands, 1,400 kilometers (870 mi) from Anchorage. The former Fort Glenn Army Air Base is on the eastern side of the volcano. Some unmaintained trails and dirt roads lead around the mountain. One dirt road leads to the gap in the caldera rim and is the principal way to access the caldera. Umnak Island is largely uninhabited, but fishery vessels sail around it all year round and a major North Pacific aviation route passes in the area. Dutch Harbor on Unalaska Island, the most important production place of seafood in the United States, is 120 kilometers (75 mi) from Okmok. The name "Okmok" was applied to the mountain by Dunn 1908, who had discovered the caldera two years before. The Aleut name of the caldera is Unmagim Anatuu; the second word means "to be thick". An alternative name for the volcano is "Zoomie".

Okmok is a 30 kilometers (19 mi) wide shield volcano (sometimes described as "shield-like composite volcano") with gentle (6°) slopes. With a volume of 200–300 cubic kilometers (48–72 cu mi) and an area of about 120 square kilometers (46 sq mi)-870 square kilometers (340 sq mi), it is one of the largest volcanoes in the Aleutians. Its slopes are mostly covered by pyroclastic flow deposits from the second caldera-forming eruption. There are more than twenty Pleistocene-Holocene cones on the outer flank of Okmok, including the 1,268 meters (4,160 ft) high Tulik (highest point of Okmok) on the southern and Jag Peak on the southwestern flank.

Glacial valleys, gullies, and amphitheater-shaped valleys with widths reaching 3.2 kilometers (2 mi) cut into the slopes. Numerous creeks radially drain the edifice to the Bering Sea and Pacific Ocean: From north clockwise they include Crater Creek, Antler Creek, Kansas Creek, Missouri Creek, Ginger Creek, Colorado Creek and Delaware Creek. Crater Creek has formed a fan around Cape Tanak, as mudflows from Okmok are preferentially channeled through this creek.

=== Caldera ===
The summit is cut by a 10 kilometers (6.2 mi) wide caldera, breached to the northeast by Crater Creek through a notch known as "Gates". Its rim is about 300 meters (980 ft) high above the floor. Arc-shaped structures 1.5 kilometers (0.93 mi) out from the northern and eastern margins indicate the caldera is actually two nested calderas. Lava flows, pyroclastic flows and scoria deposits crop out in the steep cliffs that form the inner wall of the caldera. The highest point on the caldera rim is the 967 meters (3,173 ft) high "Mount Okmok" on the northern rim. The Global Volcanism Program reports a height of 1,073 meters (3,520 ft).

Lava flows and several volcanic cones dot the otherwise relatively flat caldera floor. The cones are named A, B, C, D, E, F, G, H and Ahmanilix (formed in 2008, meaning "surprising" in the Atkan language) and form a ring on the caldera floor. Some of the cones are heavily eroded to the point of being unrecognizable. The major cones are the 240 meters (790 ft) high Cone A (two craters) at the southwestern margin, Cone E (a crater with a lake) in the western half of the caldera, Cone D (the largest) in the eastern half of the caldera, Cone F (crater breached to the northwest) at the southern-southeastern margin of the caldera and the 300 meters (980 ft) high, already erosionally modified Ahmanilix just west of Cone D.

Meltwater from snowmelt and surface water flow towards the centre of the caldera, generating waterbodies that drain through Crater Creek. As of 2008 there are two major lakes, one north of Cone D and a slightly smaller one at the centr of the caldera; both are partially or entirely within craters excavated by the 2008 eruption. Numerous other lakes are dispersed between the summit craters of cones and plains between the cones. A small debris-covered glacier covers the inward southern/north-facing slopes of the caldera, and rock glaciers have been identified inside the caldera. Past glaciation left small moraines within the caldera.

== Geology ==
The Pacific Plate subducts beneath the North American Plate at a rate of 67 millimeters per year (2.6 in/year), giving rise to the 2,500 kilometers (1,600 mi) long Aleutian Volcanic Arc. The arc has about forty volcanoes between Alaska and Kamchatka. In the central Aleutians these include from west to east Seguam, Amukta, Chagulak, Yunaska, Herbert, Carlisle, Cleveland, Uliaga, Kagamil, Vsevidof, Recheshnoi, Okmok, Bogoslof, Makushin, Mount Gilbert, Westdahl, Fisher, Shishaldin, Isanotski and Roundtop. Apart from volcanoes, subduction in the Aleutians produces frequent earthquakes.

Umnak island is on Cretaceous seafloor; the submerged Umnak oceanic plateau might extend under the island. Southwest of Okmok, a ridge formed by Tertiary volcanic rocks joins the volcano to the rest of Umnak island and the volcanoes Recheshnoi and Vsevidof. Northeast of Okmok is the Idak plateau, an uplifted older volcano. There is no evidence of faulting at Okmok. There are two tectonic stress regimes at Okmok, a northwest–southeast regional regime and a radial local one. Coastal uplift has occurred during historical times.

Surface deformation has been recorded before and after eruptions, often continuing for years, implying underground magma movements centered at 3–4 kilometers (1.9–2.5 mi) depth. The deformation source constitutes the magma chamber. Episodically recharged from deeper reservoirs, the magma chamber has a temperature exceeding 1,015 °C (1,859 °F) and is thought to be insulated by accumulated crystals. Most eruptions arise from the magma chamber, sometimes through sills or shallower chambers that feed the intracaldera cones like Cone A. With exceptions, magma is only briefly stored underground before erupting to the surface. Shallower pools of basaltic andesite magma are rarely involved, but played a role during the 2008 eruption. With rare exceptions (the Cone D immediately after the Okmok II eruption and the 2008 eruption), the magma is deflected sideward before reaching the surface via ring faults, thus erupting at the margin of the caldera instead of at its center.

=== Composition ===
Okmok has erupted basalt and basaltic andesite, which define a tholeiitic rock suite with systematic variations of silicon dioxide and trace element contents over time. The caldera-forming eruptions initially produced some rhyodacite and rhyolite, but most of their products are basaltic andesite. 20th century activity produced mostly basaltic rocks until 2008, when basaltic andesite reappeared. Vents in the northwestern sector of the caldera produce more mafic magmas than those in the southeastern. Okmok is the principal source of prehistoric obsidians in the Aleutians, as far as the Alaska Peninsula more than 1,000 kilometers (620 mi) from the volcano; the so-called "Group I" obsidian in Alaskan archaeological sites may come from there.

The Okmok rocks contain only small quantities of phenocrysts, which include clinopyroxene, olivine and plagioclase; rhyolites also contain augite pyroxene, hypersthene and titanomagnetite. Water and ice interaction has converted some of the basalts to palagonite. The rocks have a typical composition for volcanic arc magmas, with enrichment of elements presumably derived from subducted sediments and sediment-derived fluids. The subducting plate releases fluids into the overlying mantle, which ascends under Okmok and melts at temperatures of 1,500–1,600 °C (2,730–2,910 °F) to form basaltic magmas. The melts are relatively water-poor and reduced, which along with other factors results in tholeiitic magmas. Older models have a tectonic boundary close to Okmok facilitate the ascent of tholeiitic melts. The andesite and rhyolite probably form through fractional crystallization of the basalts.

== Climate, vegetation and fauna ==
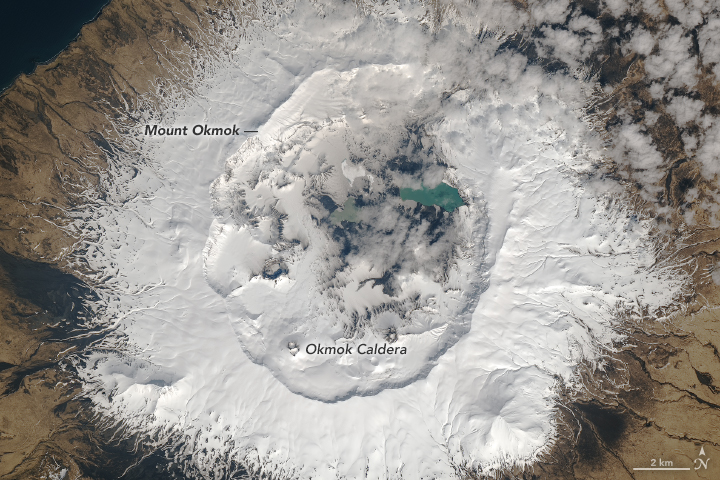
Okmok caldera from space in 2014

The Aleutian Islands have cloudy and rainy weather, with frequent storms in winter and fog in summer. Mean annual temperatures are 4 °C (39 °F). There is frequent snow cover, except on recent lava flows. The mountain obstructs the airflow, thus on the eastern (lee) side cloud cover is less. The closest weather station is at Dutch Harbor, and may not reflect the climate at Okmok. During the ice ages >55,000 and 24,000–12,000 years ago, the mountain was covered by glaciers. Minor glacier advances may have taken place between 7,500–5,500 and 3,500–2,000 years ago.

Tussock grass and tundra covers the lower parts of the volcano, with numerous flowers budding during late summer. The upper parts of the edifice above 370–550 meters (1,200–1,800 ft) are bare. Animals include red foxes, reindeer and numerous birds, and marine life occurs in the seas surrounding Umnak.

== Eruption history ==
Volcanic activity on northeastern Umnak Island commenced about 2.1–1.7 million years ago, eventually giving rise to Okmok volcano. A single rhyolitic flow was emitted on the northern flank during the Pleistocene. Older volcanic features, such as the Pleistocene Tulik, either formed in ice or show traces of glacial erosion. Effusive eruptions characterize the activity of the volcano, except for the two large caldera-forming eruptions during the Holocene: "Okmok I" about 12,000 years ago and "Okmok II" in 43 BCE. The occurrence of these explosive eruptions may be due to the accumulation of volatile-rich basaltic andesite magmas under the volcano.

The pre-Holocene volcanic history of Okmok is poorly known. Tephra from Okmok has been recovered in marine sediment cores from the Bering Sea. A large eruption 64,500 years ago (VEI 6, comparable to the caldera-forming eruptions) produced about 19 cubic kilometers (4.6 cu mi) of dense rock equivalent, which forms the "SR4" tephra in the Bering Sea. The volcano was probably glaciated during that time.

Twelve separate vents erupted inside the caldera since the last caldera-forming eruption, forming tuff cones, maars and cinder cones. Some eruptions began underwater and produced hyaloclastite and pillow lavas. The intracaldera cones are not precisely dated but Cone D is the oldest vent, at 2,000–1,000 years. Subsequent activity formed tuff cones until about 1,000 years before present, Cone F probably between 400 and 1,000 years before present and Cone E 400 years ago. Outside of the caldera, a thick base surge deposit was emplaced on the western side of Okmok 1,500 years ago and mudflows 400–300 years ago. Deposits close to Kettle Cape imply that eruptions capable of depositing ash there took place on average every 150 years during the Holocene. After the 43 BCE eruption, the rate was about one eruption every 75 years. The magma supply rate since that eruption amounts to 1.77 ± 0.1 cubic kilometers per kiloare (0.425 ± 0.024 mi^{3}/ka). More than 60 tephra layers were emplaced after the Okmok I eruption. Seismic swarms and increased seismicity occurred in 2001 and 2009.

=== Okmok I eruption ===
The Okmok I eruption 12,000 years ago is poorly documented, but some general features can be established. A lateral blast or a debris flow may have initiated the eruption. Pyroclastic flows descended the slopes of the volcano and crossed the sea to Unalaska Island. The mountain was probably snow- and ice-covered at the time, and pyroclastic flows melted the ice to form mudflows. Caldera collapse occurred only late in the sequence, and a debris avalanche formed on the northwestern flank. The eruption reached a VEI of 6. Its volume was probably twice as large as that of the Okmok II eruption, albeit with significant uncertainty. Before the caldera collapse, Okmok might have reached a height of 2,000–2,900 meters (6,500–9,500 ft).

This eruption was part of a wider surge of volcanic activity recorded in Greenland at the end of the last ice age. Conceivably, the retreat of the glacial icecaps would have generated stresses on Earth's crust that drove increased volcanic activity. The eruption would have devastated eastern Umnak, potentially wiping out most land-based life there. Ash attributed to the Okmok I eruption has been found in the Anangula Archeological District off the western coast of Umnak. The eruption may have led to the abandonment of the site, with inhabitants migrating west after the eruption, but more recent research indicates that climatic changes played a larger role, and there may not have been any substantial cultural change.

=== Holocene between Okmok I and II ===
Between the caldera-forming eruptions, the so-called "Clear Creek Basalt" lava flows, and various scoria deposits were emplaced on the volcano. A hydrothermal system may have been active in the caldera. At some point, Tulik collapsed and formed a debris avalanche that reached the sea. Several flank eruptions took place, the largest of which produced a 200 meters (660 ft) high cone at Cape Aslik.

More than three large explosive eruptions occurred during the Holocene, between the caldera-forming eruptions, one of which emplaced the so-called "Middle Scoria" shortly before the 43 BCE eruption. This layer consists of a thin volcanic ash layer overlaid by multiple lithic- and scoria-rich layers and base surge layers. The eruption column was about 10 kilometers (6.2 mi) high; frequently, water entered the column, giving rise to layered (layers during water interaction and separate layers when there was no water interaction) deposits. The Middle Scoria eruption resembled the historical 2008 eruption.

=== 43 BCE: Okmok II eruption ===
After a period of quiescence, an intense eruption took place at Okmok in 43 BCE. A rhyodacitic eruption column rose over the volcano from a vent in its northern part. Pumice lapilli fell out from the eruption column. The fallout was emplaced in three distinct units, with a brief break between the first two that lasted days to months. The fallout deposits are up to a meter thick, with the first unit being emplaced north and the second and third units southeast of Okmok. Then, a change in magma composition from dacite to andesite heralded a dramatic increase of activity. A 200–600 °C (392–1,112 °F) hot pyroclastic flow descended the slopes of Okmok, burning the vegetation buried by the preceding fallout, and traversed ridges and topography. The flow consisted of one dense basal portion and a less dense overriding cloud. The flow deposits are tens of meters thick and contain black scoria, lithics, crystals, and glass. Some flows crossed the 8 kilometers (5.0 mi) wide sea between Umnak and Unalaska to form deposits on the latter, probably on top of pumice rafts. The flows on Umnak form two facies, one stratified and one massive, depending on local topographic conditions. It is probably at this point that the collapse of the second caldera commenced. The eruption probably took place early in the year, but with the mountain largely snow-free, which may imply a long duration.

The total volume of material erupted by the Okmok II event was about 50 cubic kilometers (12 cu mi), covering about 1,000 square kilometers (390 sq mi) of Umnak. It is classified as a VEI 6 eruption, and tephra was carried as far as Greenland, where it has been recovered from ice cores. It has been used as a tephrochronologic marker on the Aleutians and for ice cores in Greenland. Humans abandoned a village on Carlisle Island west of Okmok as a consequence of the eruption, allowing seabirds to reoccupy certain areas. Impact on the other Islands of Four Mountains was probably less marked, but people may have left them after the eruption for some time.

The Okmok II eruption released about 15–16 teragrams of sulfur (but no chlorine or fluorine) into the stratosphere, causing a volcanic winter with 0.7–7.4 °C (1.3–13.3 °F) cooling across the Northern Hemisphere. The exact cooling depends on the location where temperatures are measured and the size of the sulfur release. For the Mediterranean, cooling reached about 1–4 °C (1.8–7.2 °F). (Note: A large eruption of Mount Etna took place at about the same time as Okmok II; reports of atmospheric phenomena in Mediterranean narratives at the time are more likely to reflect the Etna eruption, while climatic anomalies were caused by the Okmok event.) The effects of the eruption were compounded by another volcanic explosion one or two years before: 43 BCE and the following two years were among the coldest during the last 2,500 years, with the following decade the fourth-coldest, producing a "little ice age". This cold is recorded both in Chinese historical records and in climate proxies such as tree rings and cave deposits, and has been reproduced by computer models.

Cold waves and famines in China, and epidemics in Italy have been correlated to the event. In the Mediterranean, computer modeling and historical reports show that the eruption led to cold weather, snowfall, famines and a failure of the floods on the Nile, causing an economic and social crisis in Egypt. While a direct causal link to the Okmok eruption is not proven, and food production recovered in the following years, the longer-term effects on Egypt's food resources of both the famine and the increased interest of the Roman Republic (which was itself affected by a serious crisis), contributed to the final collapse of the Ptolemaic dynasty and the Roman Republic after the 31 BCE Battle of Actium, leading to the Roman Empire.

=== Intracaldera lake ===
After the Okmok II eruption, a crater lake filled the caldera within a decade, eventually reaching an elevation of 475 meters (1,558 ft) above sea level. At this level, it had a volume of 5.8 cubic kilometers (1.4 cu mi) and a depth of 150 meters (490 ft). Waves on the lake eroded the volcanic cones and deposited silt and sandstone, and lavas formed pillow lavas. Cone D was emplaced during two eruptive episodes within this lake. About 1,400–1,000 years ago, an intense eruption of Cone D produced large waves that overtopped the northeastern caldera margin. The lake broke out in one or several catastrophic floods, with discharge reaching 1,900,000 cubic meters per second (67,000,000 cu ft/s)-2,000,000 cubic meters per second (71,000,000 cu ft/s); this may be one of the largest floods of the Holocene, being only exceeded by the Altai and Missoula Floods and a flood on Nevado de Colima in Mexico. Another lake formed later, water levels reached an altitude of 340–350 meters (1,100–1,140 ft). Pre-caldera rock units crop out in the valley formed by the breach.

=== Historical activity ===
Okmok is one of the most active calderas in North America and the Aleutians. During the 19th century, Okmok reportedly erupted in 1805, 1817, 1824–1830, 1878 and 1899. About a dozen eruptions took place during the last century, averaging one eruption every 10–20 years. Historical activity has occurred at cinder cones within the caldera; they emplaced lava flows and volcanic ash fallout on the caldera floor. Sometimes, the Tulik vent is mistakenly assumed to be active. Eruptions reach VEI of 2–4; larger events can have impacts outside of the caldera. The 1878 eruption has been associated with a tsunami. The 1981 eruption may have caused sulfate deposition in Greenland. The entire volcano uplifts at a rate of a few centimeters per year, only to deflate shortly before and during the 1997 and 2008 eruptions.

==== 1817 CE and Cone A activity ====
The largest eruption in historical time took place in March 1817. During this eruption, lava flows dammed a 2,000,000 cubic meters (71,000,000 cu ft) lake in the caldera. The lava dam failed, causing a 2,000 cubic meters per second (71,000 cu ft/s) flood that destroyed an Aleut village at Cape Tanak. According to the geologist Constantin von Grewingk, the inhabitants had been away fishing while the eruption took place; when they returned, they abandoned the original site of the village in favour of a new one, presumably Nikolski. This eruption took place at a 4 kilometers (2.5 mi) long fissure at the northern caldera margin, forming Cone B and a maar. Apart from the flood, base surges and pyroclastic fall took place outside of the caldera.

Cone A began to grow after the 1817 eruption and became the site of subsequent, mostly effusive eruptions. The 1945, 1958 and 1997 eruptions emplaced large lava flows on the caldera floor, partly overriding each other. In 1945, a 6.5 kilometers (4.0 mi) long lava flow was produced which changed course when reaching a glacier. The 1958 lava flow reached a length of 8 kilometers (5.0 mi) and dammed a drainage, forming a lake.

==== 1997 CE ====
On the February 13, 1997, Cone A erupted, producing 9 kilometers (5.6 mi)-10 kilometers (6.2 mi) high columns of ash and steam. The eruption had a Hawaiian to Strombolian character and lasted two-five months. Lava flowed north-northeastward from Cone A to form three lobes; a first lobe to the northeast, a second to the north-northeast and a small flow to the west. At the end, lava covered about 8.9 square kilometers (3.4 sq mi) of the caldera floor with up to 50 meters (160 ft) thick aa lava. This eruption has been cited as an example of the usefulness of satellite imagery for detecting volcanic activity in the Aleutians, as (along with reports by pilots) satellites saw the thermal anomalies associated with precursory activity.

The lava flow reached a total volume of 0.15 cubic kilometers (0.036 cu mi). It was smaller than the 1958 one, was still hot in 2003, melting snow and producing steam. Surface deformation data imply that the eruption was fed from a reservoir not directly underneath cone A, moving towards the cone during the two-three years before the 1997 eruption. Over the following six years, about half of the magma erupted in 1997 was replaced.

==== 2008 CE ====
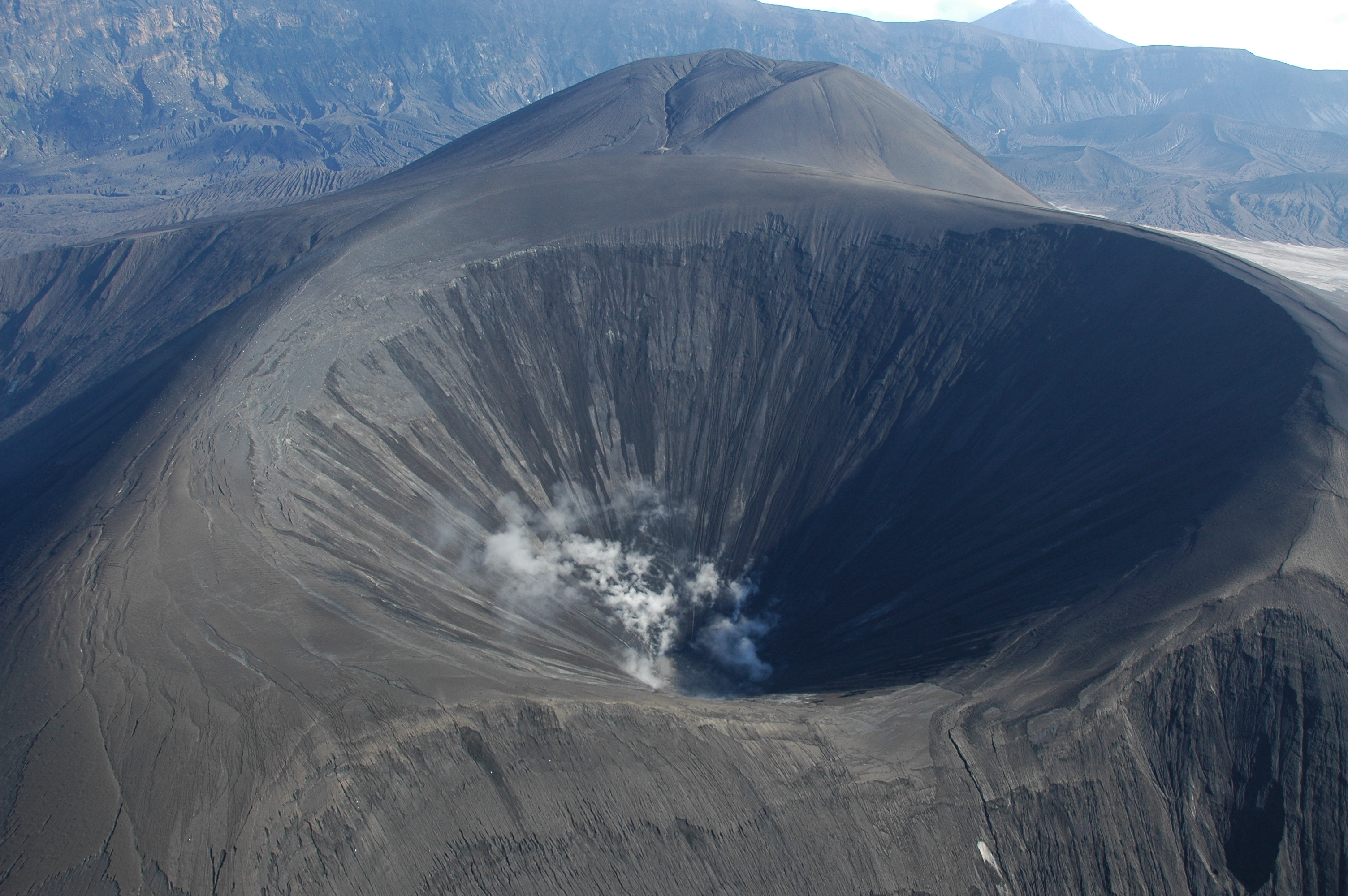
The New Cone at Okmok Volcano (Photo by C. Neal, Alaska Volcano Observatory)

An ash plume generated during Okmok's 2008 eruption.

The last eruption of Okmok was in 2008. On July 12 at 14:36 UTC, a first earthquake was recorded. Four hours later, seismic activity notably increased. At 19:43 UTC, seismic tremor indicated the beginning of the eruption and by 20:00 a volcanic ash cloud became visible in satellite images. The ash cloud grew during the following hours; three hours later, a white cloud rose from above the ash cloud, and the height of the clouds declined. The next day, two volcanic clouds were rising from Okmok, with a white (water-rich) cloud streaming east-southeast and a darker ash-rich one southeastward. The cloud height fluctuated between 2–13 kilometers (1.2–8.1 mi) and originated from multiple vents on the caldera floor before activity became limited to one crater west of Cone D by August. Eventually, ash emissions and then the seismic activity ceased in August. The tremor lasted for about 12 hours, the eruption itself continued for five weeks.

The eruption was notable for its lack of forewarning; precursory activity lasted a very short time and activity commenced by surprise. The Alaska Volcano Observatory (AVO) was alerted by the US Coast Guard after the latter received requests for assistance from a family living on the eastern side of Okmok. Alerted by noises, the population of Umnak fled, first by helicopter then by boat.

The 2008 eruption was unusual, being a rare phreatic-Plinian eruption considerably larger than previous eruptions. It was probably triggered by the entry of new basaltic magma into an older basaltic andesite magma body under Cone D left stranded there for the past 1,000–2,000 years. Interaction with water from the lake north of Cone D and groundwater made the eruption cloud water-rich, and thus difficult to detect by remote sensing techniques typically used to detect volcanic eruptions. Fine ash formed aggregates that fell out as an "ash rain" or "ash mist", reducing its long-distance spread. The cloud reached the stratosphere, leading to disturbances in air travel that were however dwarfed by the disruptions caused by the eruption of Kasatochi that same year. Ash fall into the Pacific Ocean drove a brief phytoplankton bloom, recognizable through increased chlorophyll concentrations. The eruption produced lightning, atmospheric gravity waves and infrasound, 5,000 kilometers (3,100 mi) away from Okmok. Whistlers (a type of electromagnetic emission) produced by lightning of the eruption were noted at Dunedin, New Zealand, on the other side of Earth. Pumice from Okmok was carried to Aiktak Island by the sea.

The eruption ranks as 4 on the VEI, and produced about 0.1 teragrams of sulfur, which were detected over Europe but did not affect climate. Several new craters formed west and north of Cone D, which was disrupted; some of the new craters filled with water after and during the eruption. When groundwater drained into the active vents, the waterlogged ground collapsed in some places, forming pit craters. The eruption covered parts of the caldera floor with metres-thick wet tephra and rearranged the waterbodies inside the caldera. Mudflows descended the drainages on the island, damaging bridges and forming deltas at their mouths in the ocean. The newly formed vents were rapidly degraded by erosion.

=== Fumarolic activity ===
Weak fumarolic activity occurs at the recently active vents, especially after rainfall. Their emissions consist mostly of carbon dioxide, hydrogen and nitrogen, while lacking sulfur. Prolonged fumarolic activity has emplaced fumarole minerals and weathered rock to clay. The composition of the gases indicates that they originate from a hydrothermal system that traps more acidic components like sulfur compounds.

Hot springs existed at the northern foot of Cone D, producing more than 3 cubic meters per second (110 cu ft/s) of 30 °C (86 °F) warm water. The 1958 eruption submerged them beneath a lake, during the 2008 eruption they were flooded completely although later some re-emerged. Additional hot springs were found in creeks entering the Cone D lake. A field of geysers and sinter deposits may be linked to Okmok, and the caldera has been evaluated as a site for the generation of geothermal power.

== Hazards and monitoring ==
Okmok has had large caldera-forming eruptions. Its eruptions constitute a threat to air travel, which despite the remoteness of the volcano is heavy in the region. Okmok is classified as a "high-threat volcano" (Note: "High threat" is the second-highest in a five-class scale, which considers both the threat posed by a volcano and the infrastructure/population/other human uses at risk) by the United States Geological Service. The AVO operates seismometers and equipment measuring deformation of the edifice, which relay their information to the AVO laboratories in Fairbanks and Anchorage. AVO publishes a volcano alert level for Okmok. The volcano is also the site of an array of infrasound detectors, which can also record activity at other Aleutian volcanoes.

The principal hazard from Okmok consists in volcanic ash clouds, which are transported mostly eastward by winds. Ash clouds can damage aircraft and their engines and ash fallout to the ground can cause breathing difficulties, low visibility, and damage to machinery. Pyroclastic flows and surges can scour the island, overtop ridges and topographic obstacles, and advance at speeds reaching 100 meters per second (330 ft/s). Rockfalls and slow-moving lava flows primarily occur inside the caldera. The latter can dam creeks, causing floods down Crater Creek. Ash or pyroclastic fall onto ice can produce mudflows and volcanic cones outside of the caldera may be a source of debris flows. Inside the caldera, dangerous volcanic gases occur next to fumaroles and odorless toxic gases can build up in geographic depressions. Large caldera-forming eruptions are unlikely in the near future.

== Scientific importance ==
The 1945 eruption threatened Fort Glenn, drawing attention to Okmok and Aleutian volcanoes in general. Interest in Okmok stagnated afterwards until the 1997 eruption renewed scientific attention, which made Okmok one of the best studied Aleutian volcanoes. An algorithm that processes satellite-derived thermal images of the ground to identify anomalous areas, was developed after the 1996 Pavlof eruption and renamed "Okmok Algorithm" after the 1997 eruption of Okmok, to which it was first applied.
