= Tana (volcano) =

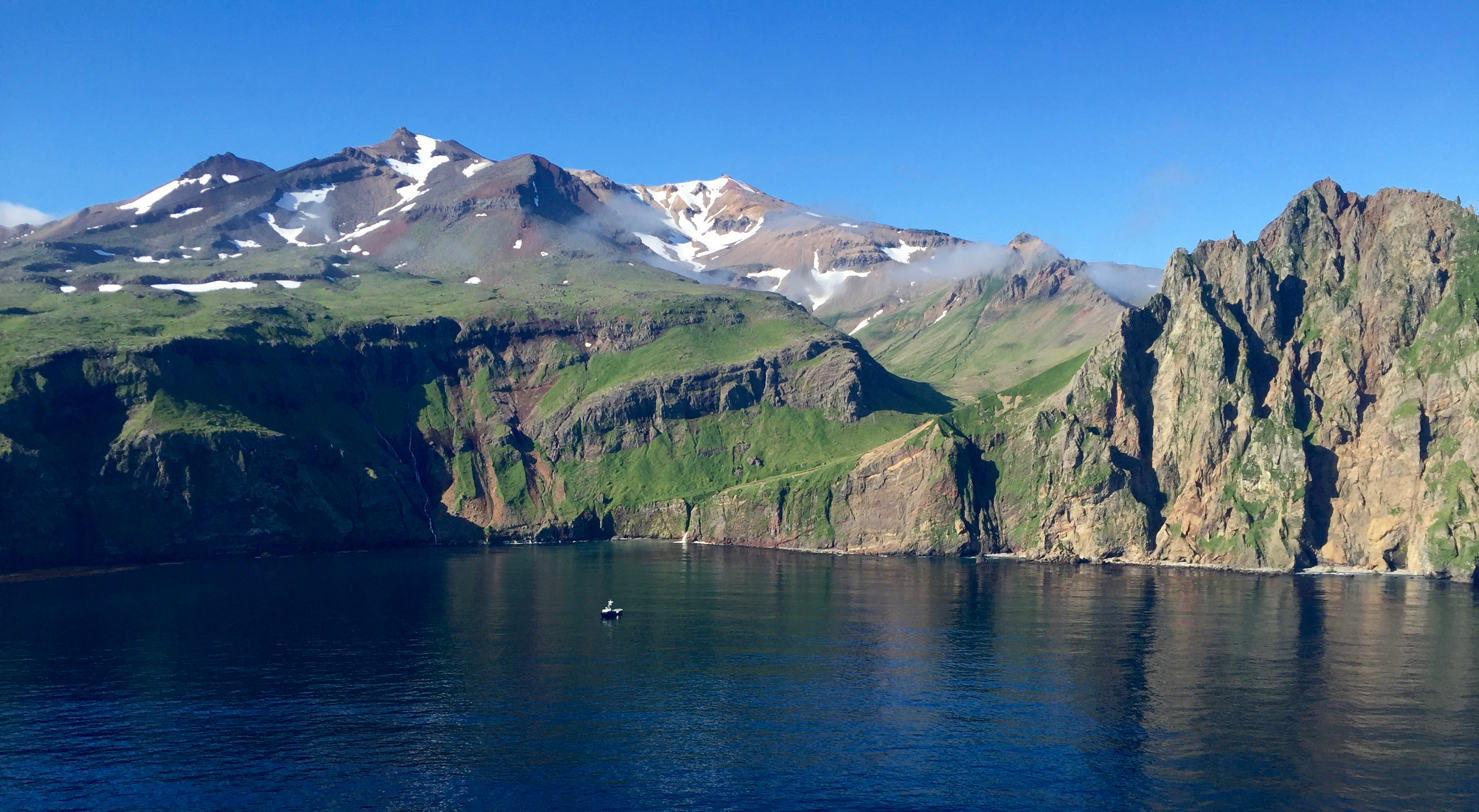

Highest point
- Elevation: 3,839 ft (1,170 m)
- Coordinates: 52°50′38″N 169°46′25″W

Geography
- Location: Chuginadak Island, Alaska, United States
- Parent range: Aleutian Range
- Topo map: USGS Samalga Island

Geology
- Mountain type: Stratovolcano cones
- Volcanic arc: Aleutian Arc
- Last eruption: mid-late Holocene

Tana is an eroded pair of east–west trending stratovolcanic cones east of the more known Cleveland volcano, and is located on the eastern end of the Chuginadak Island of the Islands of Four Mountains of the Aleutian Islands in Alaska.

== Geography ==
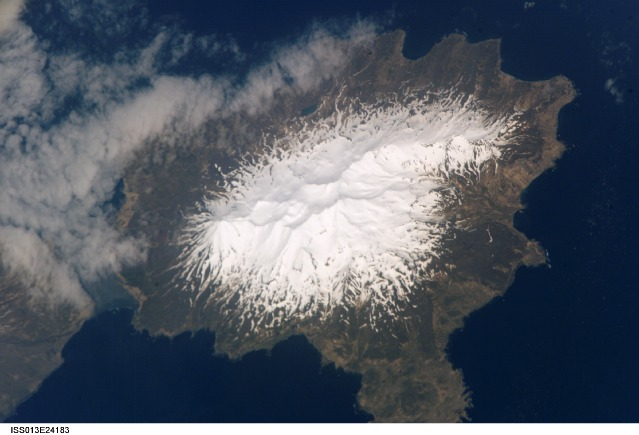
Tana viewed from satellite

Tana sits on the eastern end of Chuginadak Island, which is an island northeast of Herbert Island, south of Kagamil Island and southeast of Carlisle Island which are all a part of the Aleutian Islands.

The island consists of 2 main volcanoes, one of them being Tana, and several young cinder cones which make up the thin land strip between the volcano and Cleveland.

The nearest center of population is Nikolski, a town in Umnak Island, with a distance of 38 miles (61 km).

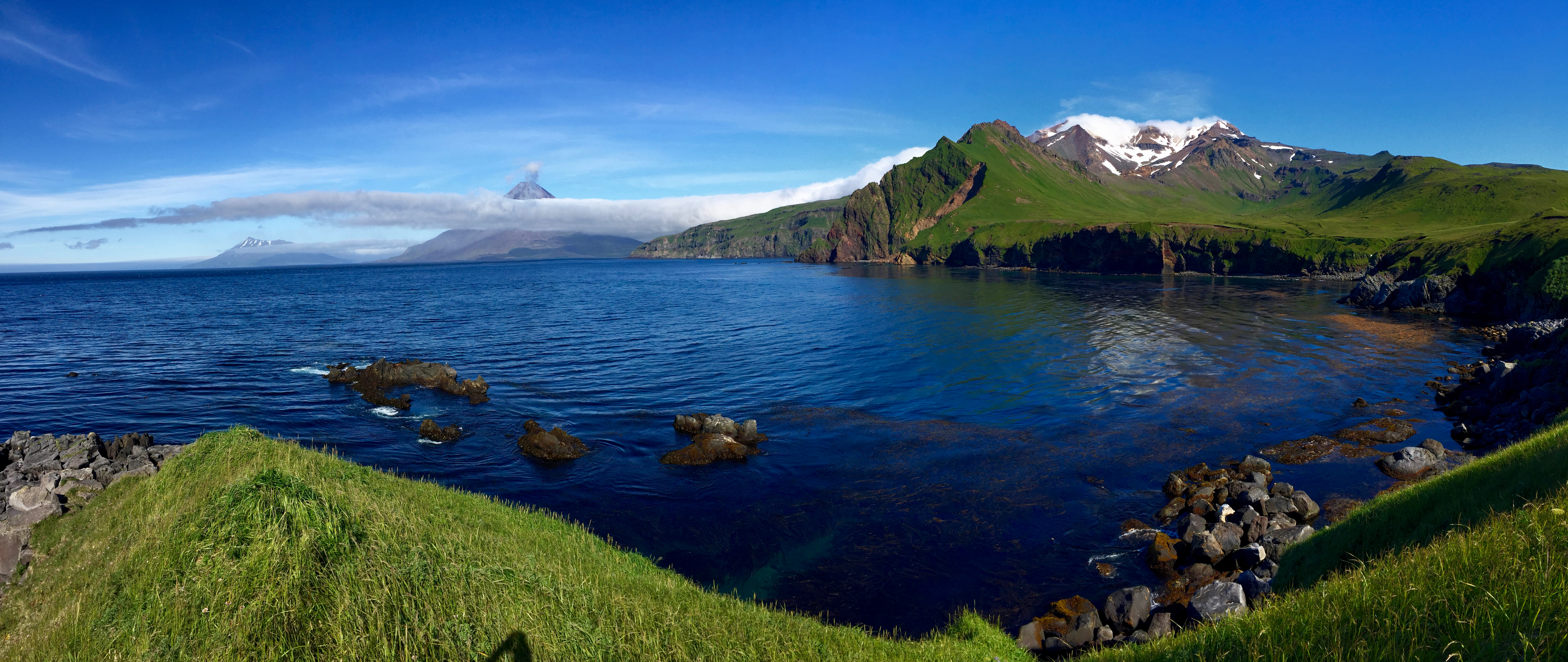
Tana viewed from Concord Point with Cleveland and Herbert in the background

== Geologic setting ==
Tana is the part of a volcanic arc known as Aleutian Arc, which spans across the Aleutian island chain and includes many volcanoes. South of the volcano is the Aleutian Trench, which is trench along the convergent plate boundary where the Pacific Plate subducts under North American Plate which forms the Aleutian Arc and all of its volcanoes.

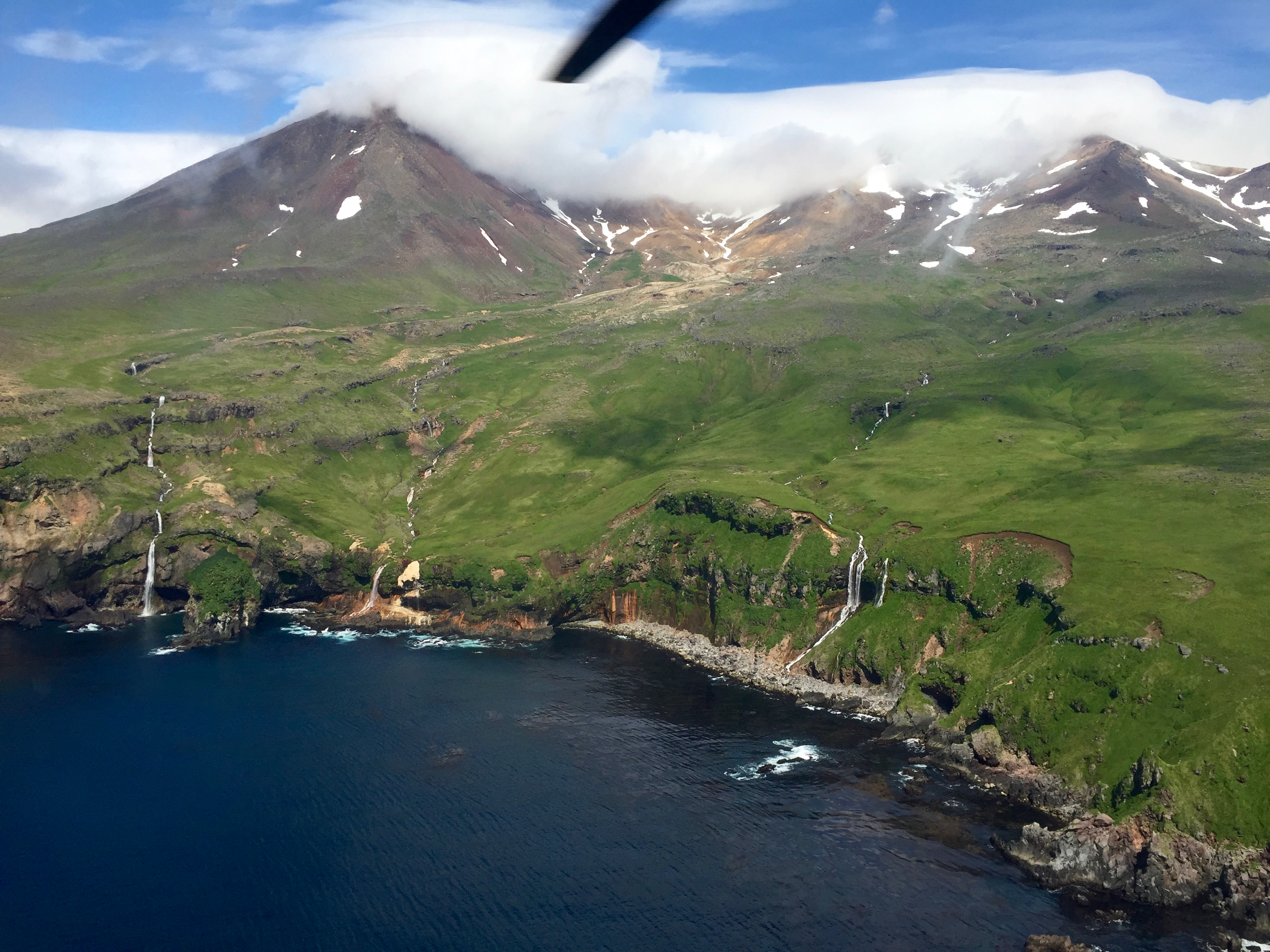
Waterfalls and other structures along the flank of Tana

== Activity ==
There is no record of any eruption at a specific date for Tana, however, there are registered active hot springs, fumaroles and mudpots within the north and northeastern flank of the volcano which proves that the volcano has shown activity in the Holocene age and is still active. At a study done in 2015, Tana's fumaroles and hot springs were inspected and as a result stable emissions and springs with temperatures of 95 °C (203 °F) were observed with acidic characteristics.

== See also ==
- List of volcanoes in the United States
- Aleutian Arc
- Islands of Four Mountains
