= Mount Recheshnoi =

Stratovolcano on Umnak Island, Alaska, U.S.

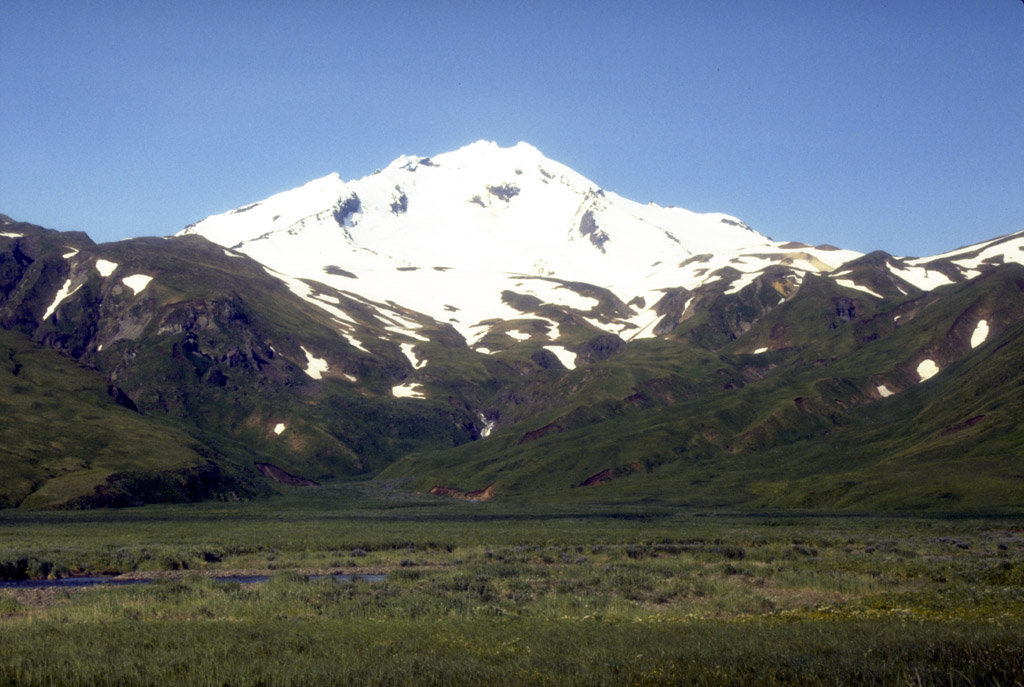
- View, looking west, at the head of the Russian Bay valley of Mount Recheshnoi.

Highest point
- Elevation: 6,509 ft (1,984 m)
- Coordinates: 53.157°N 168.539°W

Geography
- Location: Umnak, Alaska, U.S.
- Parent range: Aleutian Range
- Topo map: USGS Umnak A-2

Geology
- Formed by: Subduction zone volcanism
- Mountain type: Stratovolcano
- Volcanic arc: Aleutian Arc
- Last eruption: 3000 years ago

Mount Recheshnoi (also spelled Recheschnoi) is a heavily eroded stratovolcano located near the center of the SW lobe of Umnak Island in the Aleutian Islands of Alaska.

The northeast flank of Recheshnoi has one of the hottest and most extensive thermal areas in Alaska. The Geyser Bight geothermal area consists of six zones of thermal springs and two fumarolic areas along upper Geyser Creek and contains the only known geysers in the state. In three locations in 1988 here have been found 5 active geysers up to 2 m high and 9 natural fountains up to 0.7 m high. Other thermal areas occur at Hot Springs Cove and Partov Cove on the isthmus between Recheshnoi and Mount Okmok.

The most recent eruption of Mount Recheshnoi was on the flank of the volcano around 3,000 years ago.

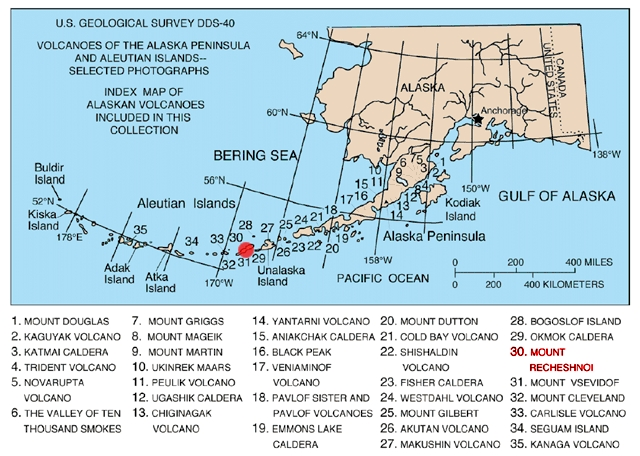
Map showing volcanoes of Alaska. The mark is set at the location of Mount Recheshnoi.

== External sources ==
- "Recheschnoi". Global Volcanism Program. Smithsonian Institution.
- Volcanoes of the Alaska Peninsula and Aleutian Islands-Selected Photographs
- U.S. Geological Survey Geographic Names Information System: Mount Recheshnoi
- Alaska Volcano Observatory
