= Uliaga Island =

Island in Alaska, United States

Coordinates: 53°03′58″N 169°46′00″W

Location in Alaska

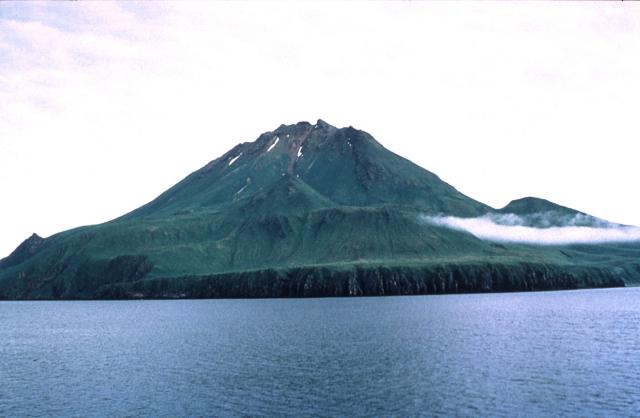
Uliaga Island from the west

Uliaga Island (also spelled Uliagan, Ouliaga, and Ouilliaghui; Russian: Уляга) is the northernmost member of the Islands of the Four Mountains group in the Aleutian Islands of southwestern Alaska. The island's name is probably derived from the Aleut place name ulaĝa, which is itself derived from ulaẍ - "bearberry." The triangular shaped island measures about 2.4 miles (3.9 km) across and consists of a single stratovolcano cone that reaches a height of 2,913 feet (888 m). The island has an area of 3.44 square miles (8.9 km^{2}). No eruptions have been recorded in historical times, though it is thought to have been active at some time during the Holocene Epoch.

== Name and etymology ==
The name Uliaga is probably derived from the Aleut place name ulaĝa. In the Aleut language, ulaĝa is itself thought to derive from ulaẍ, meaning "bearberry".

== Geography ==
Uliaga Island is the northernmost island in the Islands of the Four Mountains group in the central Aleutian Islands of southwestern Alaska. It lies at the northeastern end of the island group, just northwest of Kagamil Island. The island is roughly triangular in shape and measures about 3 kilometres (1.9 mi) across. It is formed by a single volcanic mountain that rises to 888 metres (2,913 ft) above sea level. The volcano is the smallest in the Islands of Four Mountains group. No eruptions have been recorded in historical times, although the volcano is thought to have been active during the Holocene. Today, the island is uninhabited.

== History ==
According to writings by Ivan Popov in the 19th century, the southeastern part of Uliaga was home to a small settlement of "thieving, quarrelsome people" in 1764. This settlement was destroyed by Stephen Golottof, a Russian settler who had made his home on Umnak Island, at the request of the natives of the latter island. Today, the island is uninhabited, though tourists to the Islands of Four Mountains group occasionally visit it by boat.

=== F/V Tae Woong shipwreck ===
On May 6, 1987, the Tae Woong #603, a 210-foot (64 m), 1,500-ton South Korean fishing boat, ran aground on the east side of the island. Although the crew of 49 was quickly rescued by the United States Coast Guard, the ship was too far grounded to be salvageable. Officials worried about the effect the 120,000 US gallons (450,000 L) of diesel fuel on the ship, which was leaking from a ruptured fuel tank at a rate of more than 1,300 US gallons (4,900 L) per hour, could have on the wildlife in the area (Uliaga and the entire Islands of Four Mountains group are protected as part of the Alaska Maritime National Wildlife Refuge). By the morning of May 8, the ship had leaked well over 16,000 US gallons (61,000 L) of oil and a slick spread more than 1.9 miles (3.1 km) around the vessel, which had acquired a 15-degree list to starboard. The shipwreck had occurred a few weeks before the horned puffin population had returned to the island for the summer, though the leaking fuel could potentially affect the 500,000 to 1 million migratory birds that resided on Chagulak Island, 40 mi (64 km) to the west, if not cleaned up quickly. On May 11, the US Office of Response and Restoration and the ship's South Korean owners declared the vessel a total loss and decided to eliminate the oil slick and the remaining fuel on board by blowing it up with high explosives. They concluded that the other option of transferring the remaining fuel on the ship to another vessel would be impossible due to the hazardous navigational conditions around the island and the time that would be required to implement the plan. The ship was detonated on May 13 and the slick and remaining fuel were successfully eliminated. The wreck was determined to be the result of navigational error.
