= Mount Amukta =

Volcano in Alaska, United States

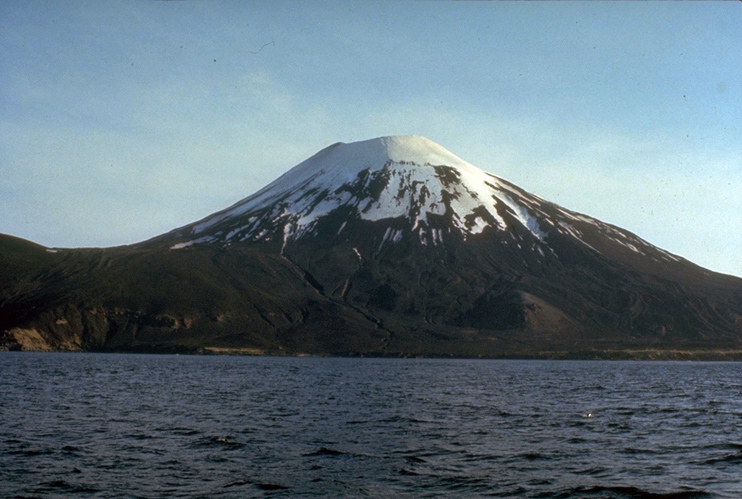
- Mt. Amukta, June 1972

Highest point
- Elevation: 3,497 ft (1,066 m)
- Coordinates: 52°30′N 171°15′W

Geography
- Location: Amukta Island, Alaska, U.S.
- Parent range: Aleutian Range
- Topo map: USGS Amukta C-4

Geology
- Formed by: Subduction zone volcanism
- Mountain type: Stratovolcano
- Volcanic arc: Aleutian Arc
- Last eruption: March 1997

The undissected (Note: An undissected volcano is one that is still relatively young, whether active or extinct, and still retains its shape and layering where its original deposited cone has not yet been dissected by any major erosion processes. In a dissected volcano, these deposition layers are cut through and exposed.) stratovolcano of Amukta volcano makes up most of nearly circular, 7.7-km-wide Amukta Island (Amuux̂tax̂ in Aleut). It is the westernmost of the Islands of Four Mountains chain. The nearest islands to it are Yunaska and Seguam Island; it is separated from Seguam Island by Amukta Pass. The cone, about 5.8 km in basal diameter and topped by a 0.4 km wide summit crater, appears on synthetic-aperture radar imagery to be built upon a 300+ meter high, east-west trending arcuate ridge.

Extensions of that ridge on the southwest and east sides of the island indicate an older caldera approximately 6 km in diameter and open to the sea on the south side. No hot springs or fumaroles have been reported from Amukta. Sekora (1973, p. 29) reports the presence of a cinder cone near the northeastern shore of the island.

== Volcanic activity ==
Well documented reports of historical Amukta volcanism are sparse; activity was noted from 1786 to 1791, and again in 1876 (Coats, 1950). Petroff lists activity at Amukhton in 1770, presumably the same volcano; conversely, Dall describes a cessation of activity at Amukta in 1770. On February 13, 1963 an eruption occurred involving the central crater and one or more parasitic vents; both ash and lava were produced (Anchorage Times, February 11, 1963; Decker, 1967). Persistent low clouds obscured the exact source of the lava, but the flow was seen to extend from the west side of the cone southwest into the sea at Traders Cove.

In late August and early September 1987, a commercial pilot observed a 10.5 km high eruption plume rising through cloud cover near Amukta Island. On September 4, another pilot observed a small dark ash plume issuing from the summit of Amukta. On Sept. 18, yet another pilot reported a 300m-high ash plume.

In early July 1996, a passing ship reported a 1-km high plume of "ash and smoke". On August 28 Mt. Cleveland, 100 km to the northeast, was also active and winds were blowing towards Amukta.

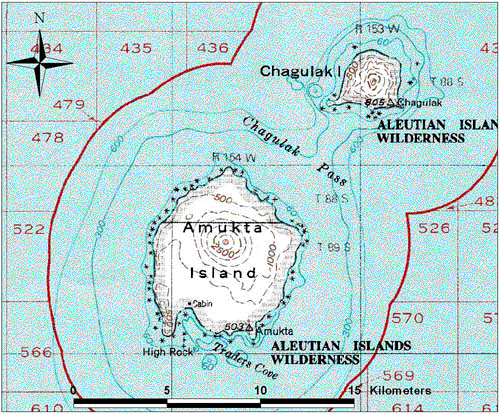
Map of Amutka Island.

== Composition ==
Igneous rocks produced by this volcano range from granite to monzonite, however the most common rock found in/around Mt. Amukta is basalt.

== See also ==
- List of volcanoes in the United States of America
