= Kagamil Island =

Island in Aleutians West Census Area, Alaska, United States

Coordinates: 52°59′35″N 169°42′43″W

Location in Alaska

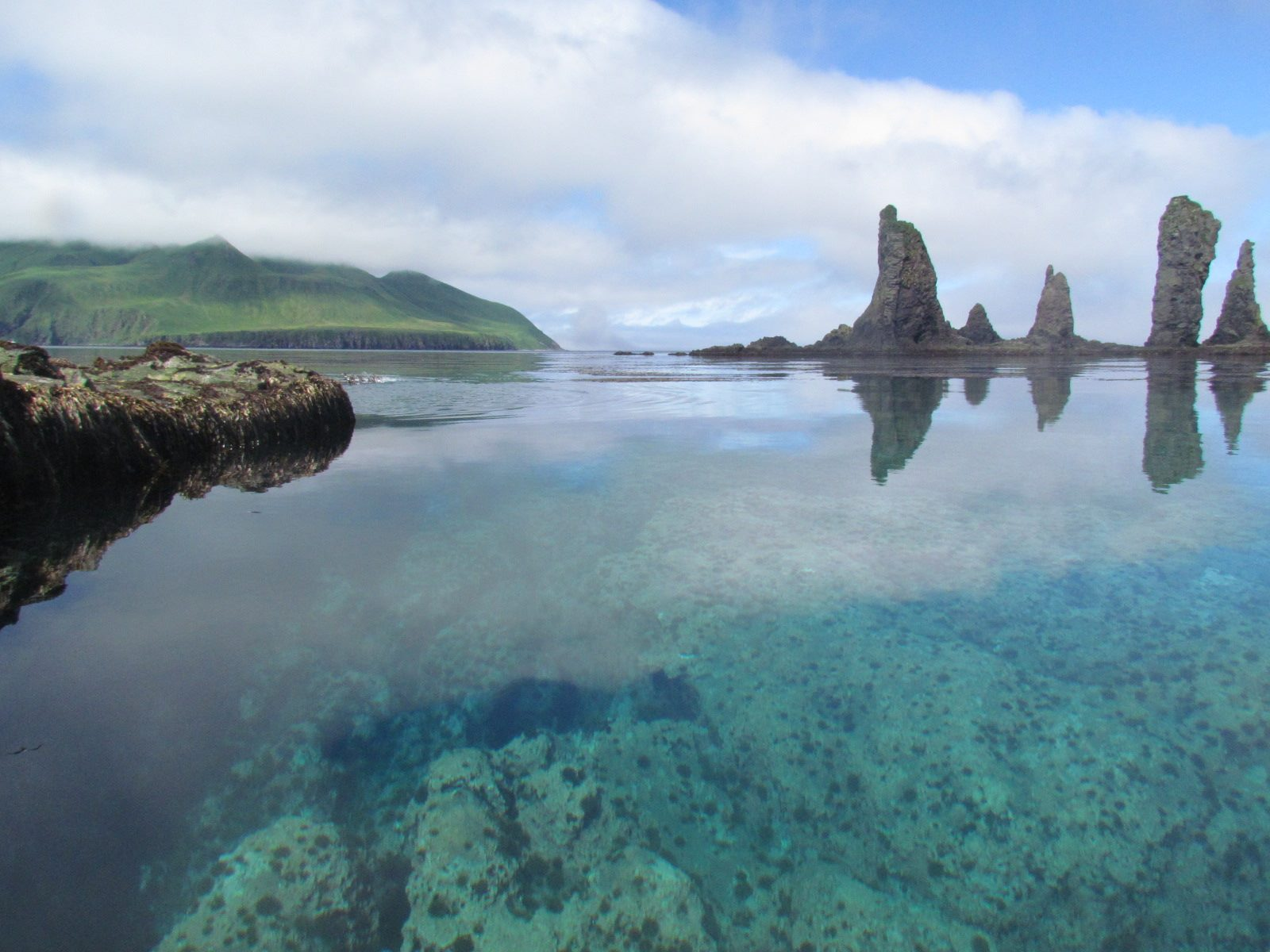
North Cove of the island

Kagamil Island (Aleut: Qagaamila; Russian: Кагамил), in the Islands of Four Mountains subgroup of the Aleutian archipelago, is 3.7 miles (6.0 km) north of Chuginadak Island and 1.2 miles (1.9 km) south of Uliaga Island. It is 6.2 miles (10.0 km) in length and up to 3.1 miles (5.0 km) in width. The southern half of the island is dominated by the Kagamil Volcano, which has two summits: one is 2,930 feet (890 m) above sea level, while the other is lower at 2,260 feet (690 m).

Henry Wood Elliott discovered a cave on the island containing 13 native mummies. Over 50 bodies were recovered by Aleš Hrdlička from 1936 to 1938.

== History and geography ==
Kagamil Island is one of the four mountains of the Aleutian Archipelago. It is located on the Western tip of Alaska, bordering the Bering Sea. This island was given the Unangam Tunuu name by Captain Tebenov in 1852 when he discovered the island. Kagamil had also received various names by other Russian explorers. Two major volcanoes are located toward the southern tip of this island. One crater is above sea level, while the other one is below sea level. As of 1929, the activity of these two volcanos is unknown, but during that year, some volcanic activity was detected underground these two natural structures. Surrounding these summits are multiple sites of hot springs. The average temperature of this region is approximately nine degrees celsius, and it is home to plenty of wildlife.

== Archaeological discoveries ==
Henry Wood Elliott discovered a cave on the island containing 13 native mummies. Over 50 bodies were recovered by Aleš Hrdlička from 1936 to 1938.

=== Early tool use ===
Recently, two skeletons have been discovered in these caves along with many tools. These skeletons were found among volcanic ash remains. Archaeologists have conducted radiocarbon dating of the specimens, and they found that these date back to approximately 3000 BC when the last volcanic eruption occurred in the area. Among these tools, they found that a great portion were made from bird bones. With these bones, it appears that they stitched together fragments to create blad-like structures, which suggests that these early people lived in a hunter-gatherer society. In addition to bone tools, this early society seemed to use stone tools as well. At the time when the volcanoes were active, the most abundant rock was obsidian. Archaeologists have found many obsidian flakes as well as obsidian cores. They used these obsidian flakes to build various tools. Although their tools suggest that they may have lived a hunter-gatherer life, archaeologists have also found remains of permanent dwellings among the volcanic ash. These dwellings appear to be purposed for permanent dwellings as there have been multiple living units discovered in the spaces. In fact, in some excavation sites, archaeologists have found up to 300 individual houses. Within these houses, works of pottery and netting were found. This raises the point that these people have developed the skill of fishing to provide for their community.

=== Feather samples among the mummies ===
Feather samples among the mummies have also been closely analyzed. Scientists and archaeologists working on the Kagamil island have cooperated to try and identify these species from which these feathers came from. Researchers used microscopic evidence to find the exact family, genus, and species of these bird species to obtain insight of the past environment of the Kagamil islands. They use microscopic details because these bird feathers have microscopic features such as barbs that help with this identification. In addition, these specimens from the excavation site reveal that pre-Aleutian society not only used the feathers, but they also used bird skin for many purposes.

=== Repatriation ===
Human remains removed from Kagamil Island during twentieth-century collecting and research expeditions have been the subject of repatriation efforts. In 1936, naturalist and wildlife biologist Olaus Murie removed human remains from a cave on the island. The remains were later donated by his family to Wyoming's Teton Science School.

According to the Teton Science School, partial remains from three individuals disappeared from the institution's collection in 1973 and were rediscovered in 2021, nearly fifty years later. The school subsequently began steps to repatriate the remains to the Unangan community of Nikolski under the Native American Graves Protection and Repatriation Act.

== Subpopulations of early Kagamil Island inhabitants ==
Researchers have used stable-isotope analysis of human remains from the Aleutian Islands to investigate population history and dietary change over time. One study identified differences between individuals associated with Paleo-Aleut and Neo-Aleut populations and suggested that the Paleo-Aleut population existed approximately 1,000 years ago and was later followed by the Neo-Aleut population.

The study also analyzed human remains from three archaeological sites and found differences in diet between the two populations. Bone chemistry indicated that individuals associated with the Neo-Aleut population consumed foods from higher trophic levels than those associated with the earlier Paleo-Aleut population.

Researchers also reported differences in cranial and post-cranial morphology between the two populations. The Paleo-Aleut population was described as having different post-cranial characteristics, while the Neo-Aleut population was described as having a rounder and wider cranium.
