= Mount Cleveland (Alaska) =

Nearly symmetrical stratovolcano on Chuginadak island

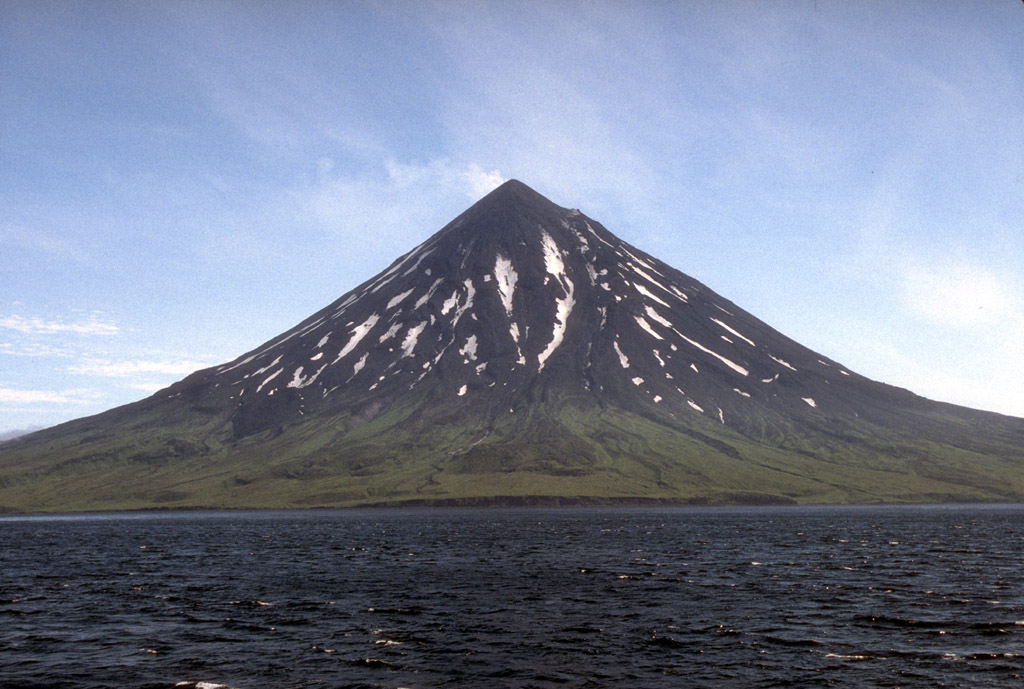
- The nearly symmetrical face of Mount Cleveland, 1994

Highest point
- Elevation: 5,675 ft (1,730 m)
- Prominence: 5,675 ft (1,730 m)
- Listing: US most prominent peaks 82nd
- Coordinates: 52°49′20″N 169°56′42″W

Geography
- Location within Alaska
- Location: Chuginadak Island, Alaska, United States
- Topo map: USGS Samalga Island

Geology
- Formed by: Subduction zone volcanism
- Rock age: Holocene
- Mountain type: Stratovolcano
- Volcanic arc: Central Aleutian Arc
- Last eruption: May 17, 2017

Mount Cleveland (also known as Cleveland Volcano) is a nearly symmetrical stratovolcano on the western end of Chuginadak Island, which is part of the Islands of Four Mountains just west of Umnak Island in the Fox Islands of the Aleutian Islands of Alaska. Mount Cleveland is 5,675 ft (1,730 m) high, and one of the most active of the 75 or more volcanoes in the larger Aleutian Arc. Aleutian natives named the island after their fire goddess, Chuginadak, who they believed inhabited the volcano. In 1894 a team from the United States Coast and Geodetic Survey visited the island and gave Mount Cleveland its current name, after then-president Grover Cleveland.

One of the most active volcanoes in the Aleutian Arc, Cleveland has erupted at least 22 times in the last 230 years. A VEI 3 eruption in 1944 produced the arc's only known volcanic fatality. Most recently Mount Cleveland has erupted three times in 2009, twice in 2010, once in 2011 and in 2016 and 2017. The volcano's remoteness limits opportunities for its study, and the Alaska Volcano Observatory relies heavily on satellites for monitoring. The volcano is primarily hazardous to aircraft; many of the flights over the north Pacific approach the vicinity of the volcano, and volcanic ash released from eruptions can damage sensitive electronic equipment and sensors.

== Geological setting ==
Mount Cleveland is located 490 km (304 mi) from the western end of the Aleutian Arc, a long volcanic chain extending off the coast of Alaska. Containing over 75 volcanoes, this volcanic arc occurs above the subduction zone where the Pacific Plate plunges under the North American Plate. As the plate moves deeper into the earth, the increasing pressure results in the loss of volatiles, certain elements and compounds with low boiling points, from various hydrous minerals. One of these compounds is water; its addition to the mantle wedge formed between the subducting and overriding plates lowers the melting point enough to allow magma to form. The melted material then rises to the surface and forms a volcano—in this case, the Aleutian Arc.

== Etymology ==
The native Aleut name for Mount Cleveland is Chuginadak (the name currently given to the island as a whole), referring to the Aleut fire goddess, thought to reside in the volcano. The volcano's name is a reference to its constant activity, and shows that it was likely highly active even in the distant past. Aleut oral tradition states that, at one time, the western and eastern halves of Chuginadak were separate islands, and that the isthmus joining them was created by volcanic activity sometime in prehistory. The "Islands of Four Mountains" name, the geographic group name for Cleveland and its neighbors, was given to the islands by Russian cartographers in the 19th century. Its current name, Mount Cleveland, was given to it by a United States Coast and Geodetic Survey expedition in 1894, when it was originally observed by the USS Concord. Like the other volcanoes in the Four Islands group, which were named after prominent American politicians at the time, Mount Cleveland was named after then-president Grover Cleveland.

== Geography and structure ==
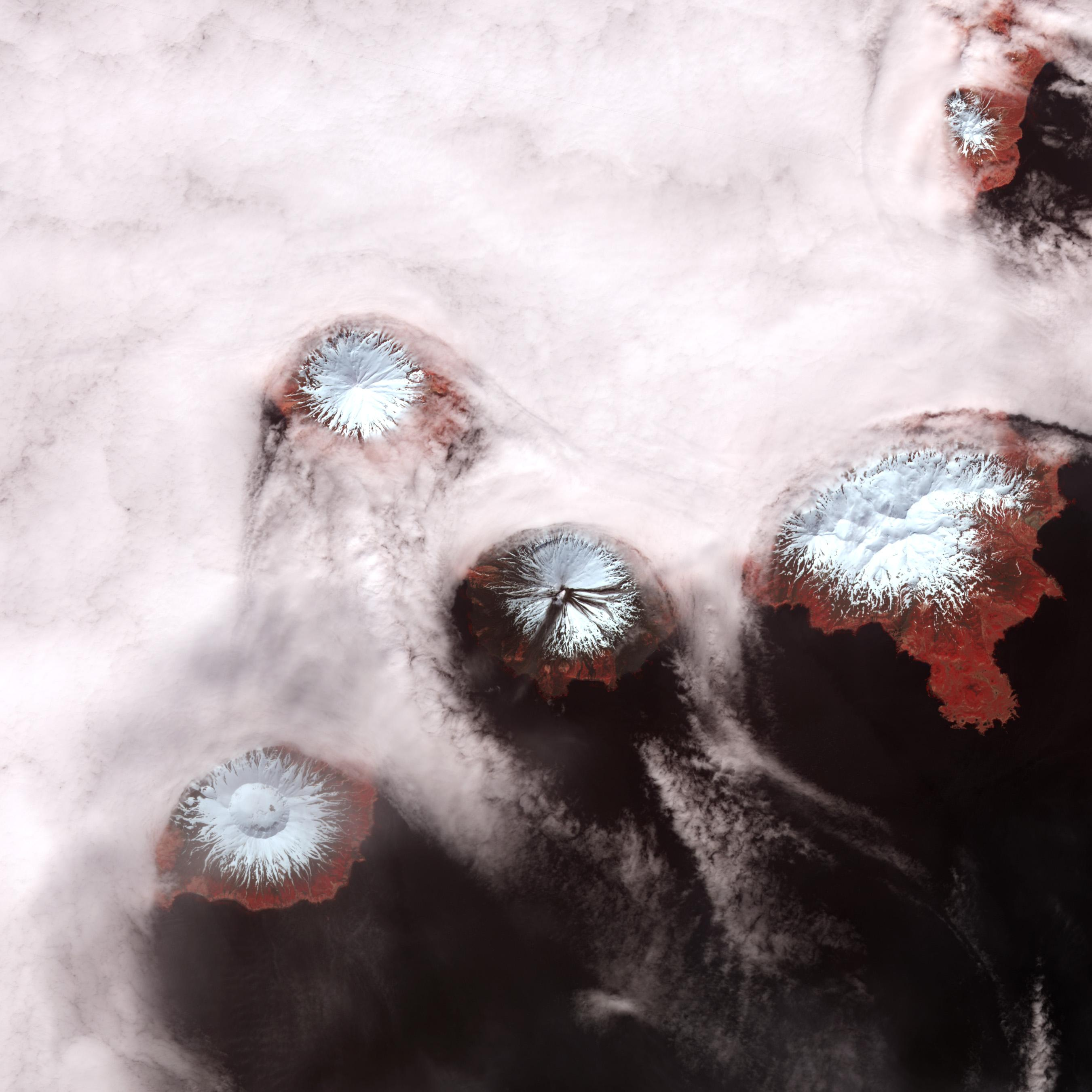
The Islands of Four Mountains, centered on Mount Cleveland. Dark lines are ash flows.

Mount Cleveland is an almost symmetrical andesite stratovolcano in the Islands of Four Mountains, a volcanic group in the Aleutian Arc. Like all stratovolcanoes, Mount Cleveland grew as explosive eruptions, effusive eruptions, and lahars built it layer by layer into a convex shape. It lies southeast of Mount Carlisle and northeast of Herbert Island. Mount Cleveland forms the western half of Chuginadak Island, a broad and uneven bell-shaped landmass, and is the highest of the four volcanic islands. The island is completely uninhabited; the nearest settlement is Nikolski on Umnak Island, about 75 km (47 mi) eastward.

Mount Cleveland is 8–8.5 km (5.0–5.3 mi) wide at its base and roughly 29 km^{3} (7 cu mi) in volume. The volcano's slope increases markedly with height, from 19° at its lower flanks to 35° near its summit. Like many other Aleutian volcanoes, Cleveland's flanks are especially rough up to 300 m (984 ft), covered by multiple overlapping lava flows and debris fans that form an apron around the mountain. Lava flows are always built on top of debris flows as a result of the snow melt caused by the emission of heat just before an eruption. The flows are generally short, under 1 km (0.6 mi), and thin, less than 10 m (33 ft) thick, and are somewhat vegetated. Although Mount Cleveland is the tallest mountain in the group, it is rarely completely snowed in because of its constant activity disrupts snowfall. A lack of extant erosion shows that Mount Cleveland is likely a Holocene volcano, forming within the last 10,000 years. All known events have occurred at Mount Cleveland's summit vent, but there are at least five small andesite to dacite volcanic domes on the lower flanks. At times Cleveland has had a summit lava dome. The volcano has no caldera.

The eastern half of Chuginadak, to which Mount Cleveland is connected by a narrow isthmus, consists of several low-lying volcanic cones and two prominent peaks that have been heavily eroded, partly by glaciers. Known as the Tana volcanic complex, the two features measure 1,170 m (3,839 ft) and 1,093 m (3,586 ft) in elevation. A sample of rhyolite has been recovered from Concord Point, the easternmost point on the island.

== Eruptive history ==
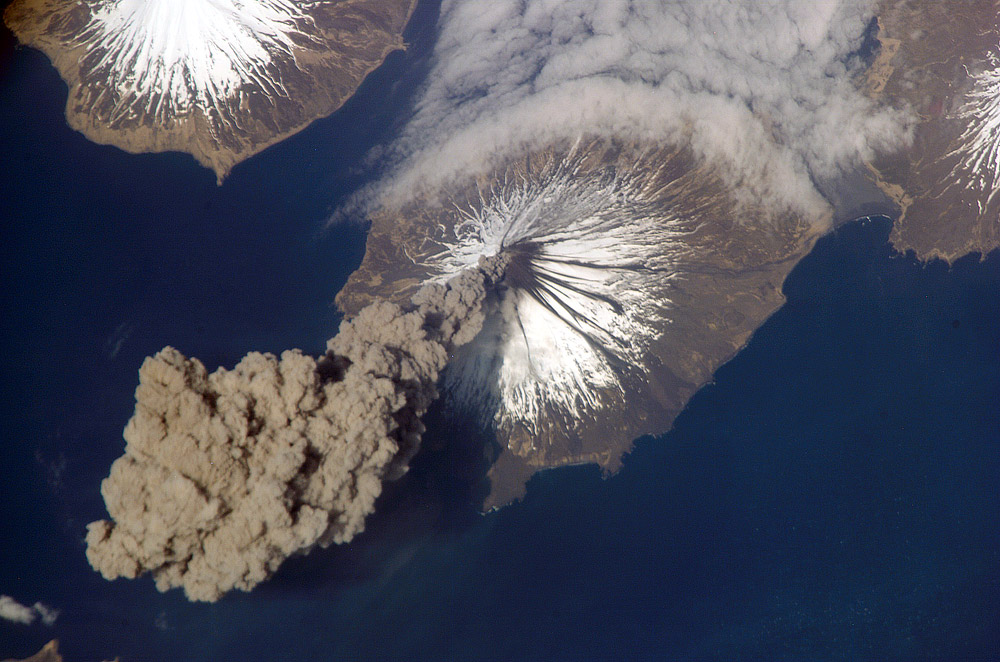
Ash plume arising from Mount Cleveland on May 23, 2006, as seen from the International Space Station. Astronauts were the first to observe the eruption, and alerted the Alaska Volcano Observatory.

Eruptions from Mount Cleveland are generally vulcanian and strombolian in nature, characterized by short explosive ash clouds sometimes accompanied by a'a flows, lava fountains, pyroclastic flows, ash and steam emissions, lava dome growth, and the ejection of breadcrust bombs. Hot springs were reportedly found on the volcano in the 1800s, and persistent fumarolic activity was observed in the 1980s and 1990s. Mount Cleveland is a site of persistent steam emissions and thermal anomalies that represent constant background activity. During 2011, a summit lava dome formed, by continuous intrusion of magma at the summit. Late in 2011, nearly 6 explosions demolished the dome. In June 2012, another small dome was observed.

Little is known about Cleveland's early eruptive history as its remoteness makes it a difficult area to investigate, and discrepancies in names have caused confusion between events there and those on nearby Carlisle. Even today, not all possible events are confirmed as eruptions by the Alaska Volcano Observatory, and many are listed as "possible." In observed history, Mount Cleveland may have first erupted in 1744; the first confirmed eruption occurred in 1828. The volcano erupted again in 1836 (possibly), 1893, 1897 (possibly), 1929 (possibly), 1932, and 1938 (possibly).

The first notable eruption from Mount Cleveland was a Volcanic Explosivity Index (VEI) 3 Vulcanian eruption that occurred between June 10 and June 13, 1944. Lava flows extended 5 km (3 mi) from the summit, and an ash plume 6,000 m (19,685 ft) high was produced. Large boulders were reportedly ejected and carried out to sea by eruptive force. The eruption had the distinction of being the only confirmed direct volcanic fatality in Alaska; a small detachment from the Eleventh Air Force was stationed on the volcano at the time, and one Sergeant Fred W. Purchase left his post early in the eruption to take a walk and never returned, probably killed by mudslides. At approximately 10:20, a boat sent to search for Purchase witnessed the end of the eruption. The island was abandoned for the remainder of the war.

Mount Cleveland erupted more recently in 1951, 1953, 1954 (possibly), 1975 (possibly), 1984 through 1987, 1989, 1994, and 1997. The volcano has received more focused attention in recent times due to its increased activity: it erupted in 2001, 2005, three times in 2006, 2007, three times in 2009, and twice in 2010. Of these, the most significant eruption was the 2001 eruption, which produced a 12 km (7 mi) high ash plume. This plume dispersed 120 to 150 km (75 to 93 mi) across Alaska, an unusual distance that allowed detailed satellite observations to be made. Nikolski and the surrounding region was the site of several hours of ashfall, represented in satellite imagery as areas of discolored snow. This eruption significantly disrupted air traffic in the area.

On June 19, 2012, a pilot reported an ash-producing explosion on Mount Cleveland. Due to continuing seismic activity, the volcano was placed on the USGS Volcano Watch List in the orange or "watch" category the following day. AVO continues to keep Cleveland on the watch because of a persistent anomaly at the summit. AVO suspects it could be dome growth. Other minor ash producing explosions occurred on June 26, July 12, and August 19.

On May 4, 2013, the volcano began a low-level eruption, with a plume of ash observed at 15,000 feet (4,600 m).

The volcano erupted several times in 2014 and 2015, and a single explosion was detected by the AVO on April 16, 2016.

In total the volcano has erupted at least 22 times in the last 230 years.

== Monitoring ==
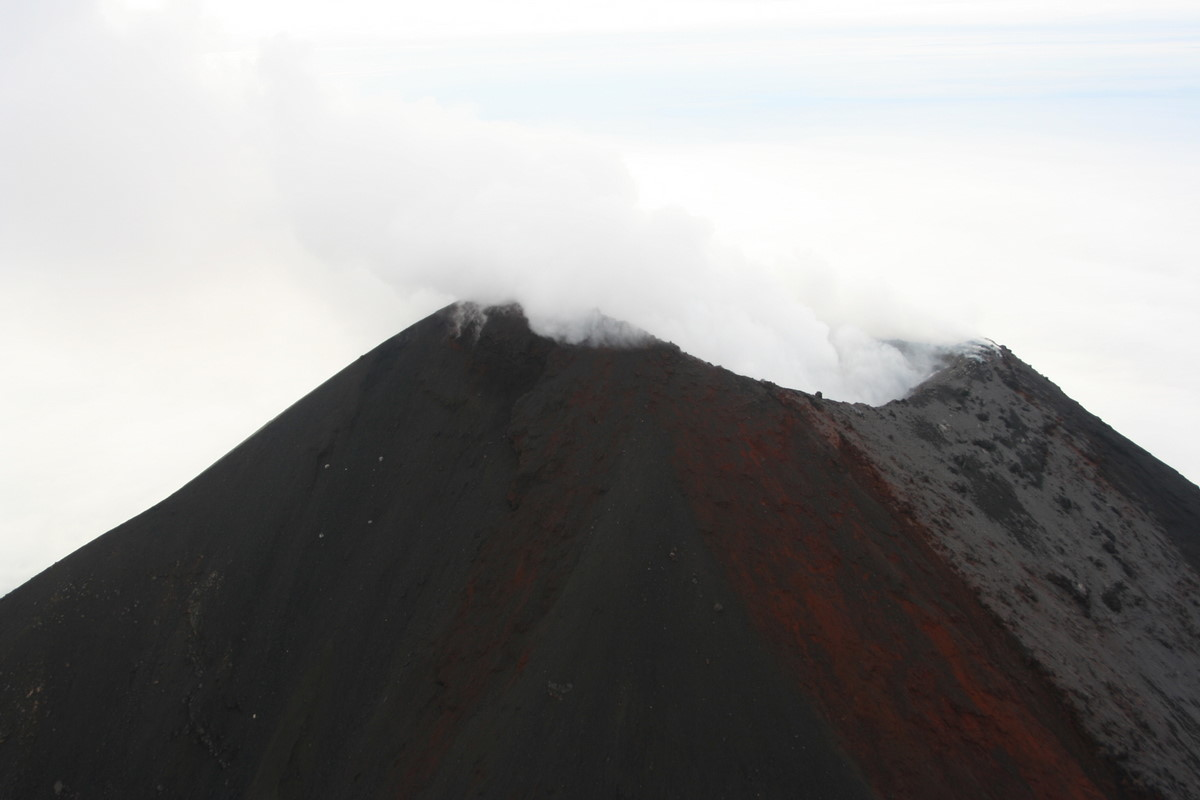
Steam emissions from the summit of Mount Cleveland, 15 August 2008

Today, the Alaska Volcano Observatory monitors activity at Mount Cleveland using satellite imagery. Cloud cover often obscures the volcano, which makes many events difficult to follow. In addition, the low resolution of the satellite imagery allows minor events, which do not make an impression on the satellite picture, to pass unnoticed. There are no seismic or geophysical instruments on the mountain (the nearest are in Nikolski), and some eruptions are first observed by pilots flying over the volcano. A field study was conducted in late 2001, and an automatic system based on thermal anomalies was implemented following eruptive events in 2005. In recent years the Alaska Volcano Observatory has made an effort to expand volcanic coverage westward along the Aleutian Arc.

The biggest threat posed by an eruption from Mount Cleveland is its ash plume, which can damage sensitive electronic equipment on overflying planes. Many aircraft traveling over the North Pacific and over the Arctic come within the vicinity of such a plume; the only way to avoid damage is to reroute the flight, which delays arrival time and adds $5,500 to $6,000 in extra fuel costs. Cleveland has therefore been assessed by the United States Geological Survey as "a volcano with a high aviation threat score and no real-time ground based monitoring at the present time".

== See also ==
- List of mountain peaks of Alaska
- List of volcanoes in the United States
