= Chagulak Island =

Volcanic island in Alaska, United States

Coordinates: 52°34′20″N 171°08′29″W

Location in Alaska, U.S.

Chagulak Island (also spelled Chugul, Chugula, Chegoula, or Tchougoulok; Russian: Чагулак) is a small, uninhabited volcanic island in the Islands of Four Mountains group in the Aleutian Islands of southwestern Alaska, United States. The 1.9 mi (3.1 km)-wide island consists of a single cone that reaches an elevation of 3,747 ft (1,142 m). Chagulak is a stratovolcano and is separated from the nearby Amukta Island by a channel about 4.3 miles (6.9 km) wide; though the two islands are joined underwater. No eruptions have been recorded and very little is known about the volcano, as the only study done on Chagulak so far is a single chemical analysis of a "low-potassium, high-alumina basaltic andesite" from the north shore.

== Gallery ==
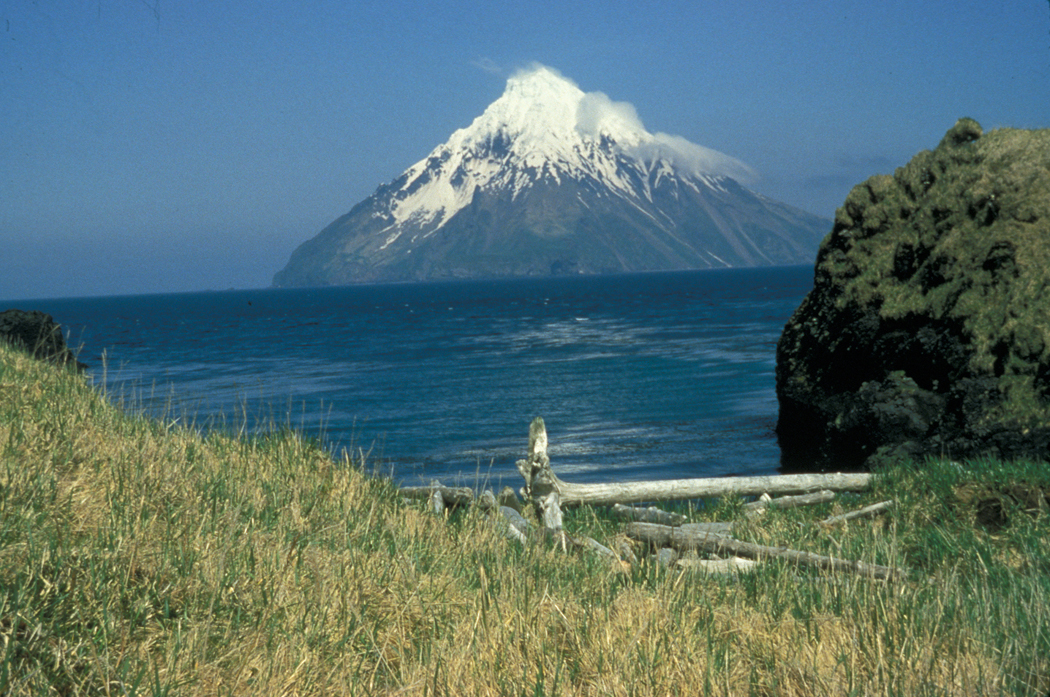
Chagulak Island, seen from Amukta Island

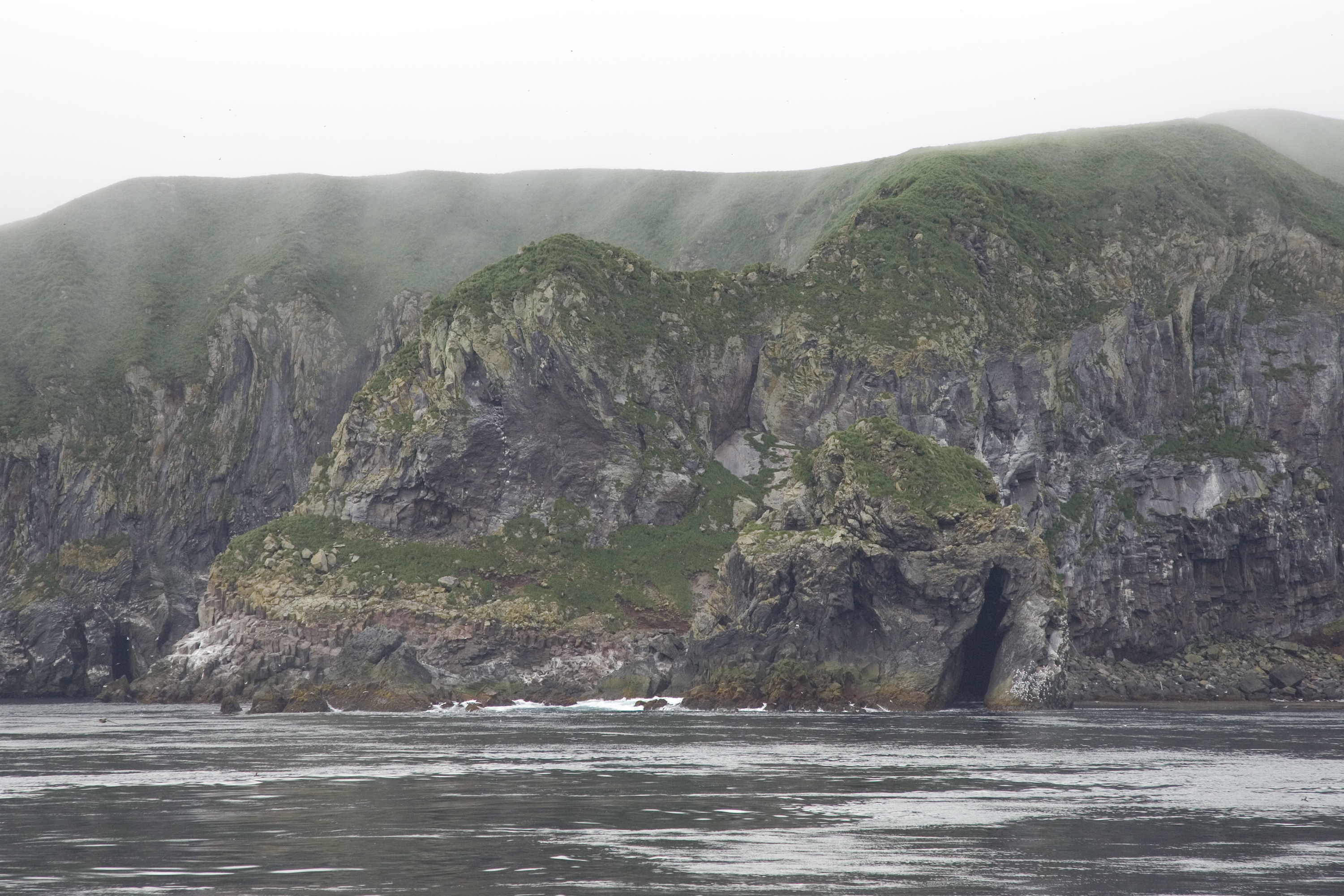
Closeup of Chagulak Island

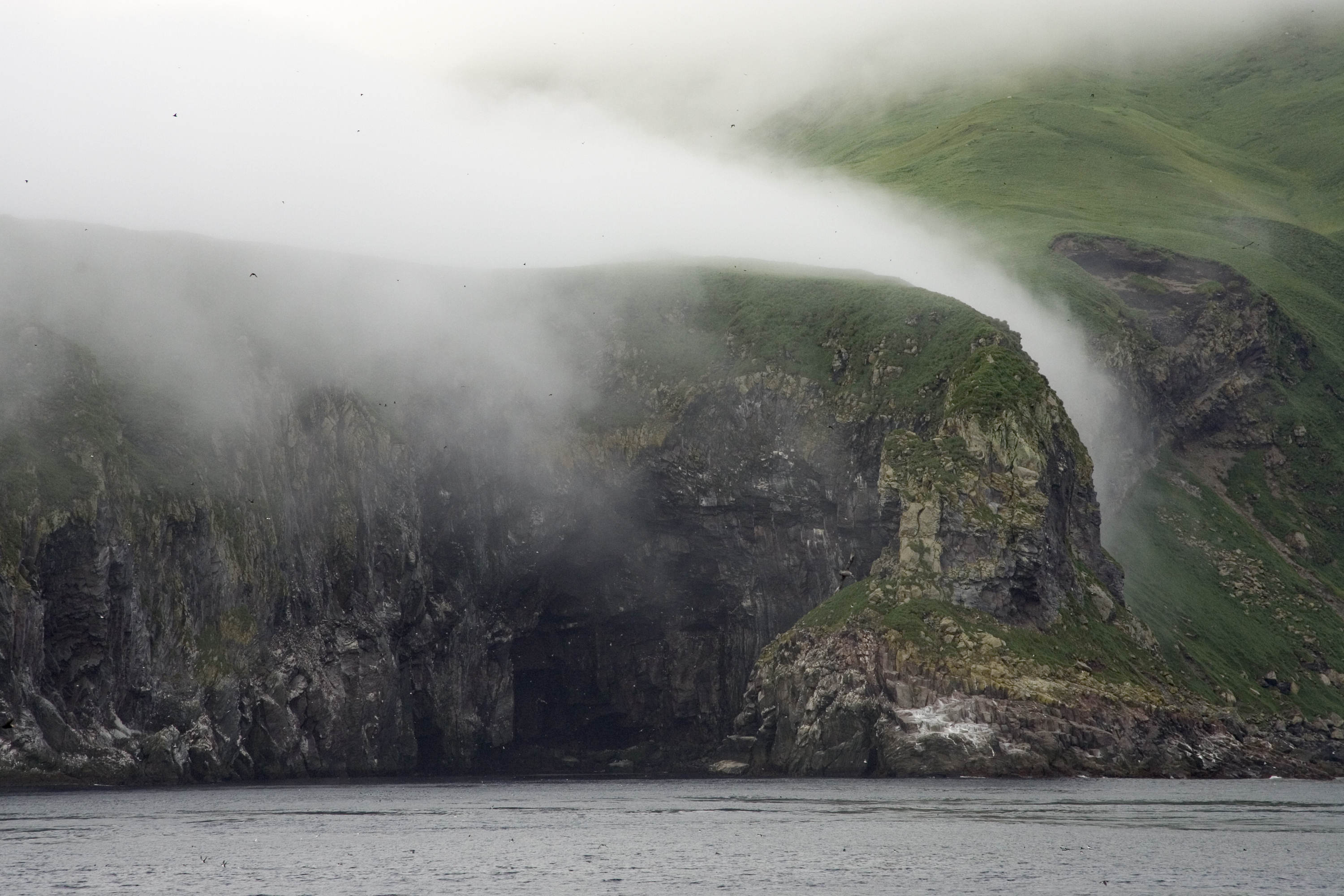
Coastal view with fog

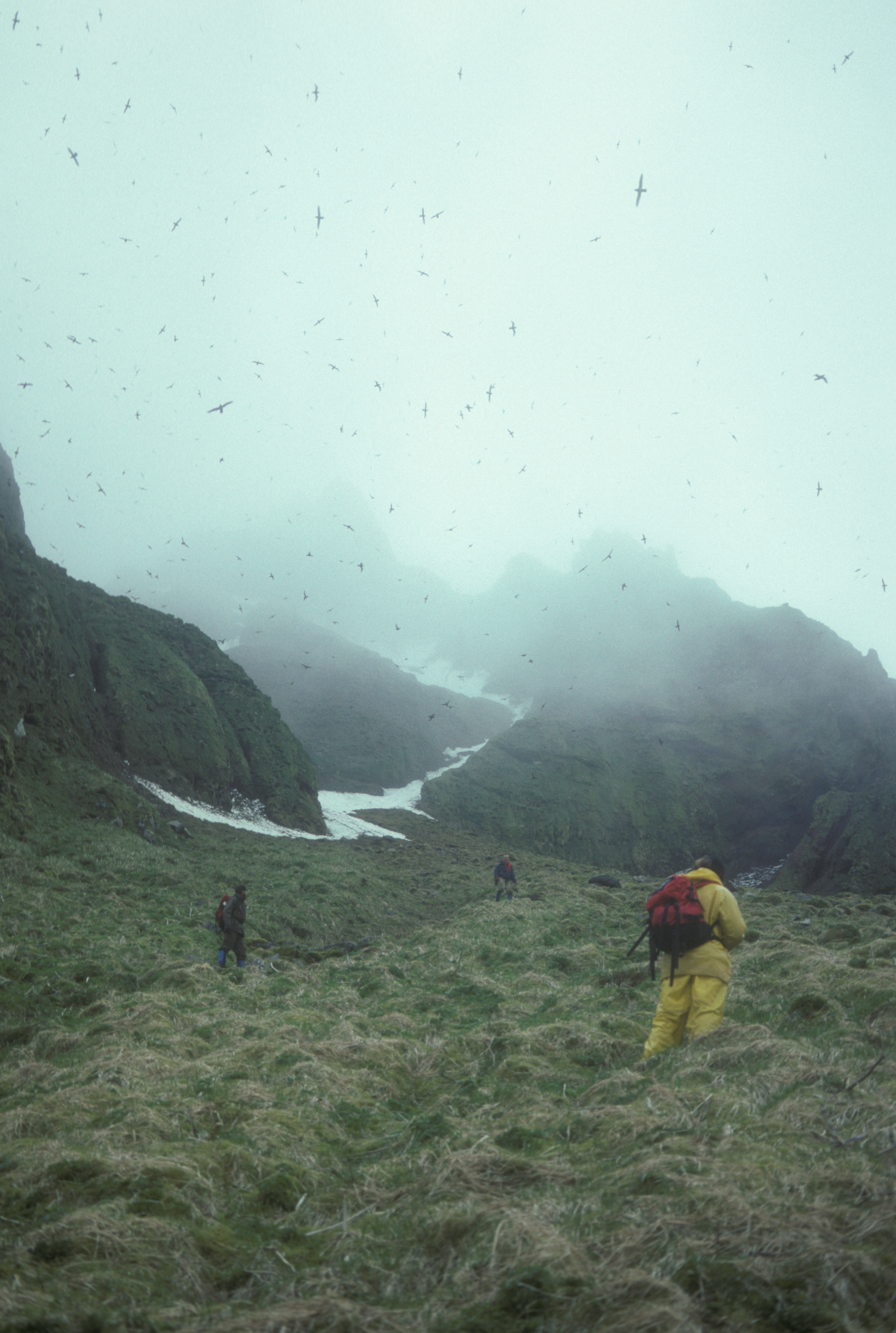
View of Chagulak Island field crew (1990)
