= Mount Carlisle =

Volcano in Alaska, United States

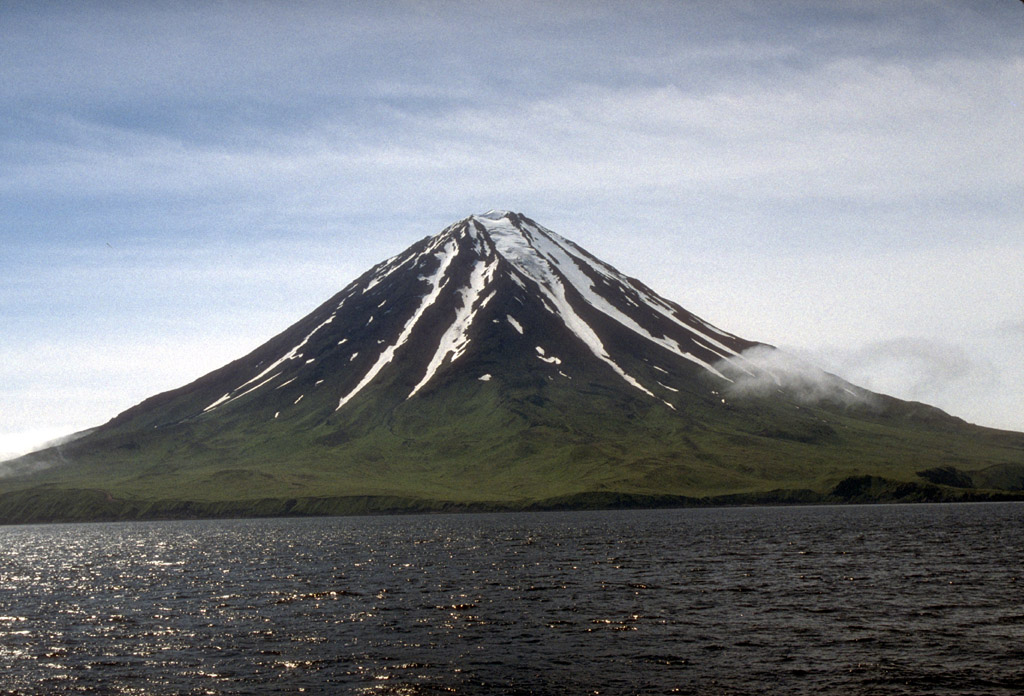
- View of steep-sided, symmetrical Carlisle volcano on Carlisle Island

Highest point
- Elevation: 5,283 ft (1,610 m)
- Prominence: 5,283 ft (1,610 m)
- Listing: US most prominent peaks 105th
- Coordinates: 52°53′38″N 170°03′15″W

Geography
- Location within Alaska
- Location: Carlisle Island, Alaska, U.S.
- Parent range: Aleutian Range

Geology
- Formed by: Subduction zone volcanism
- Mountain type: Stratovolcano
- Volcanic arc: Aleutian Arc
- Last eruption: 1828

Mount Carlisle is a stratovolcano in Alaska which forms part of the 5 mile (8 km) wide Carlisle Island, one of the Islands of Four Mountains which, in turn, form part of the central Aleutian Islands.

Despite its modest summit elevation, a small glacier exists high on the western slopes just below the rim of the summit crater.

A few historical eruptions of Carlisle have been recorded, but its proximity to several other neighboring volcanoes means that there has been some confusion in the older records as to which of the volcanoes was erupting. As the area is extremely remote, distant observations of volcanic plumes cannot be verified for certain.

It is 1.9 miles (3.1 km) across the Carlisle Pass from Chuginadak Island and is 5.6 miles (9.0 km) northeast of Herbert Island. Carlisle Island has as diameter of 4.3 miles (6.9 km).

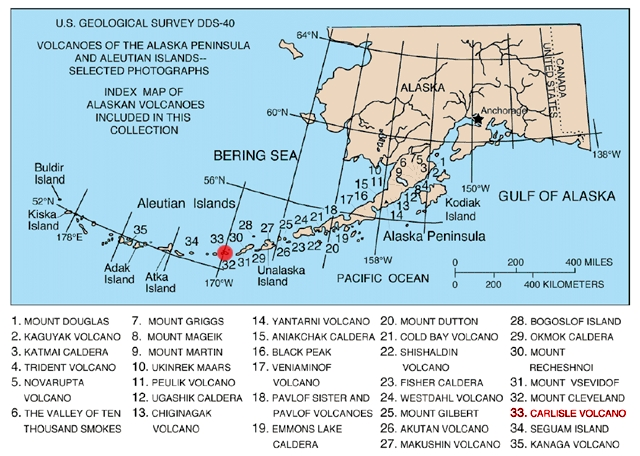
Map showing volcanoes of Alaska. The mark is set at the location of Mount Carlisle.

== See also ==
- List of mountain peaks of North America
  - List of mountain peaks of the United States
    - List of mountain peaks of Alaska
- List of Ultras of the United States
- List of volcanoes in the United States
