= Islands of Four Mountains =

Group of Aleutian Islands in Alaska, United States

Coordinates: 52°52′33″N 169°47′42″W

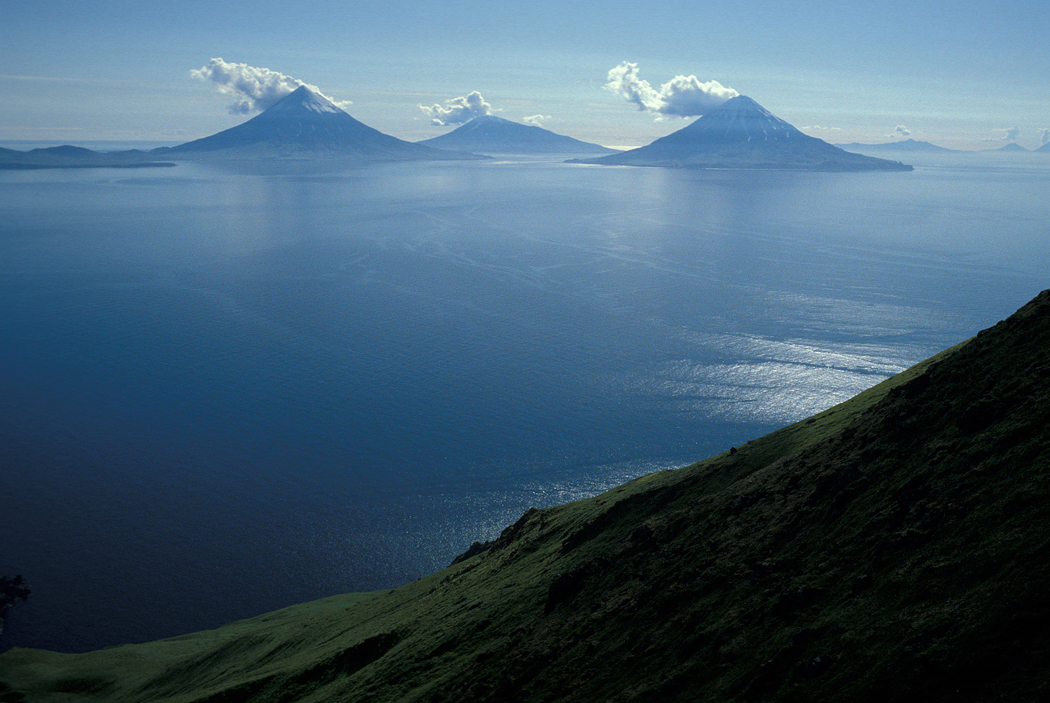
Islands of Four Mountains

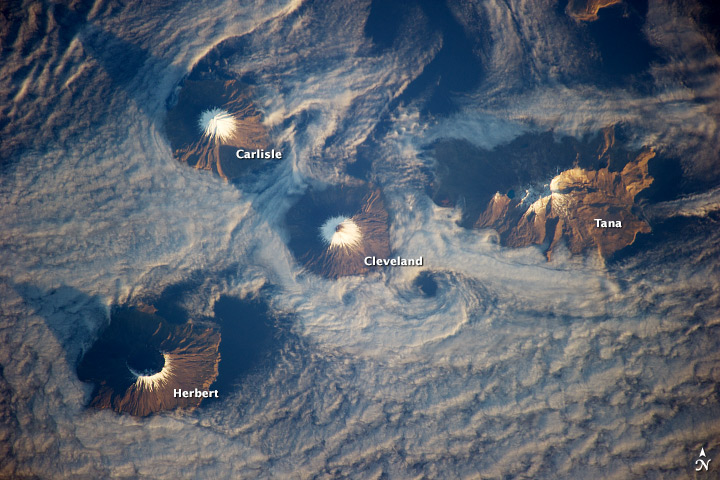
Islands of the Four Mountains, from ISS

The Islands of Four Mountains (Russian: Четырёхсопочные острова) is an island grouping of the Aleutian Islands in Alaska, United States. The chain includes, from west to east, Amukta, Chagulak, Yunaska, Herbert, Carlisle, Chuginadak, Uliaga, and Kagamil islands. This island chain is located between Amukta Pass and the Andreanof Islands to the west, and Samalga Pass and the Fox Islands to the east. These islands have a total land area of 210.656 sq mi (545.596 km^{2}) and have no permanent population. The two largest islands are Yunaska and Chuginadak. Chuginadak is mainly made up of the active volcano Mount Cleveland.

The name is translated from Russian Четырехсопочные Острова (Ostrova Chetyre Soposhnye) meaning "Islands of Four Volcanoes" (Sarichev, 1826, map 3). The early Russian explorers named the islands by this term because of four prominent volcanoes, each located on a separate island. The Aleut name Unigun (Uniiĝun in the modern Aleut orthography) was reported in 1940 by Father Veniaminov. There appears to be confusion regarding the names of these islands, possibly because only four of the five are on most early maps and charts. The present names were gathered in 1894 by a field party from USS Concord and published in 1895 by the U.S. Navy Hydrography Office (Chart 8). This is the first island in the Aleutian time zone, 1 hour behind Alaska with daylight saving time as of 2010.
