= Herbert Island =

Alaskan island in the Bering Sea

Coordinates: 52°45′11″N 170°07′10″W

Location in Alaska

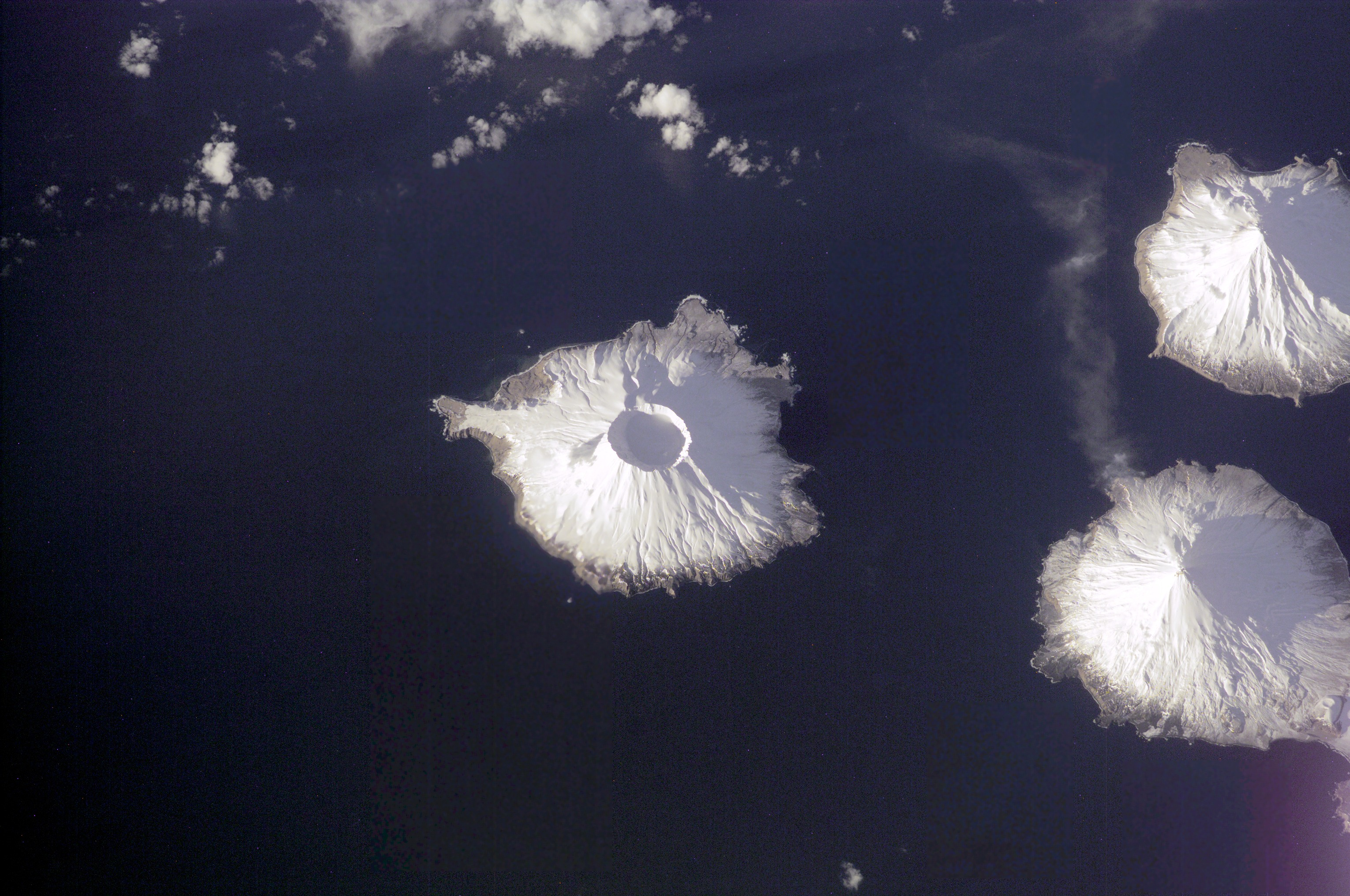
Herbert Island from Space

Herbert Island (Aleut: Chiĝulax̂; Russian: Херберт) is an island in the Islands of Four Mountains subgroup of the Aleutian archipelago. It is 3.1 miles (5.0 km) from Chuginadak Island, separated by the Chuginadak Pass. Yunaska Island is 16 miles (26 km) west southwest of Herbert Island. Measuring 6.2 miles (10.0 km) across, Herbert Island is somewhat circular in shape and is covered by the 4,200-foot (1,300 m) Herbert Volcano, whose 2-kilometre (1.2 mi) wide caldera is one of the largest in the Aleutian Islands. The Herbert Volcano is most likely a stratovolcano. There have been no recorded eruptions here.

The island is 8.95 km (5.56 mi) long and 9.14 km (5.68 mi) wide.
