= Chuginadak Island =

Island in the Aleutian Islands of Alaska, USA

Chuginadak
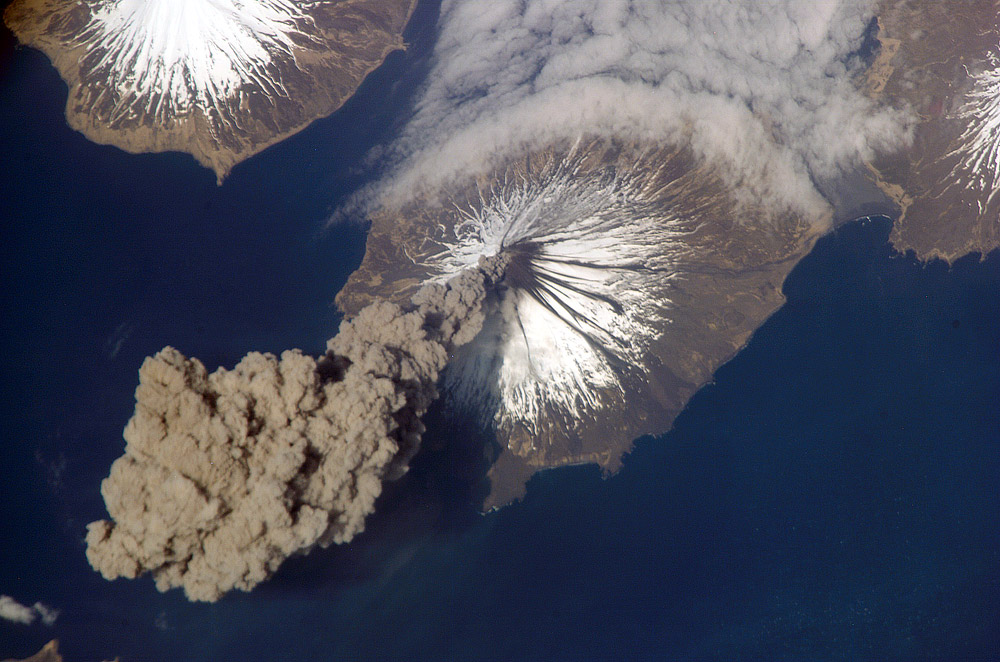
- Mount Cleveland erupts in 2006. Taken from the International Space Station
- Interactive map of Chuginadak

Geography
- Location: Aleutian Islands, Alaska, United States
- Coordinates: 52°50′41″N 169°49′05″W
- Archipelago: Islands of Four Mountains
- Area: 64 sq mi (170 km^{2})
- Highest elevation: 5,676 ft (1730 m)
- Highest point: Mount Cleveland

Administration
- United States

Demographics
- Population: 0

Chuginadak Island (Aleut: Tanax̂ Angunax̂; Russian: Чугинадак) is the largest island in the Islands of Four Mountains subgroup of the Aleutian archipelago. Chuginadak is an Aleutian name published by Captain Tebenkov in an 1852 map. According to Knut Bergsland's Aleut Dictionary, the Aleutian word "chugida-lix" means "to fry, to make sizzle." The Western half of the island is called Chuginadax in Aleut, meaning 'simmering'.

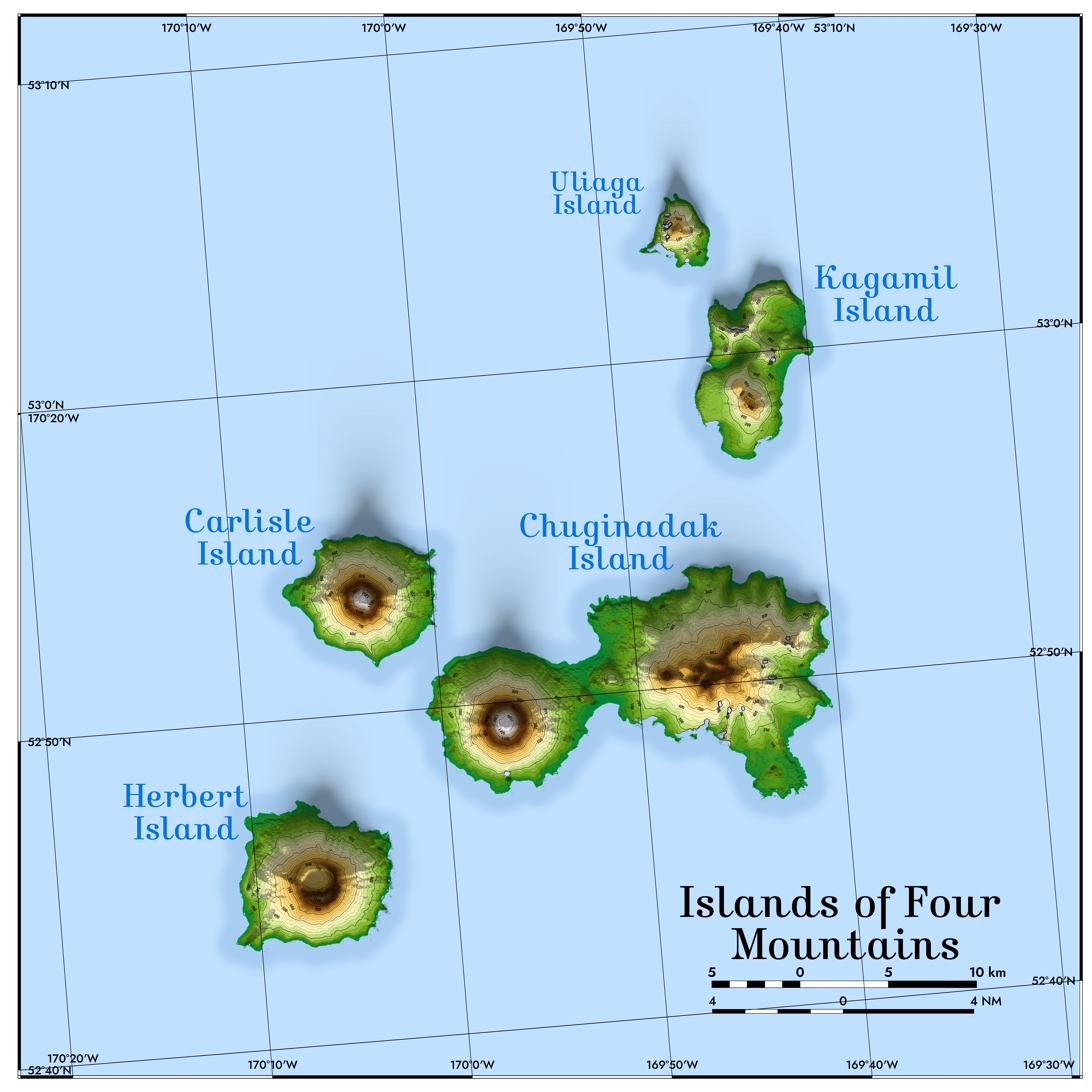
topographic map of the Islands of Four Mountains

The island is approximately 14 by 6 miles (22.5 by 9.7 km) long and the currently active Mount Cleveland stratovolcano forms the entire western half of the land mass and the eastern half of the island is the heavily eroded and less famous stratovolcano Tana. These halves of landmasses are connected with a small strip of land.

The only major geographical place is Applegate Cove (2.5 miles across) (Chuguuĝix̂) on the Northern coast. The cove was named for Samuel Applegate, USC&GS, who commanded the schooner Nellie Juan during a survey of this area in the 1880s.

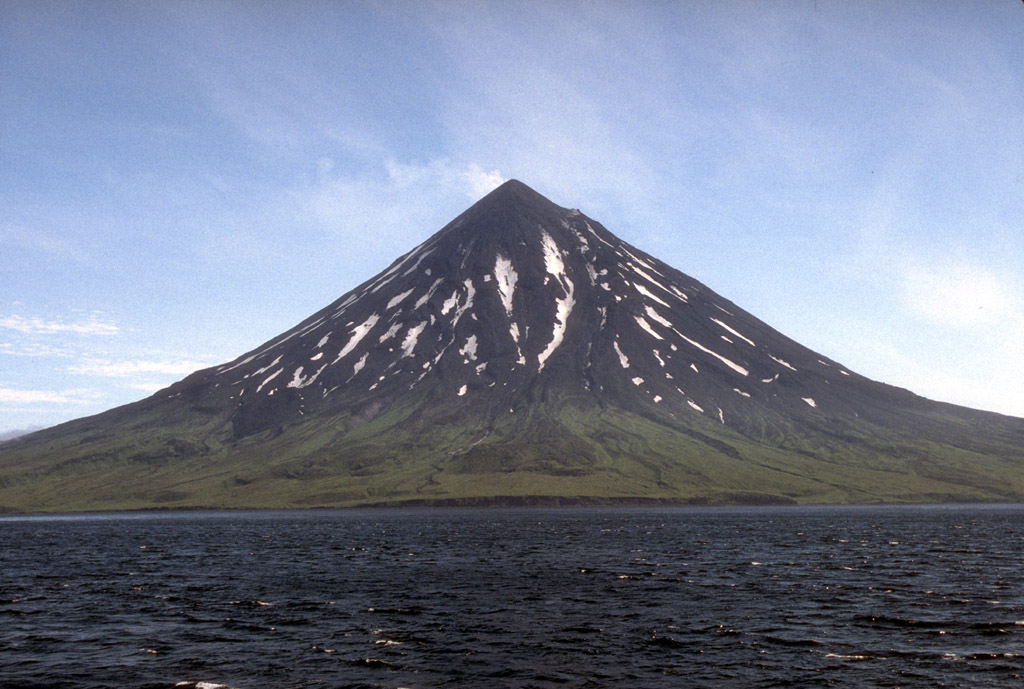
Mount Cleveland, 1994. Mount Cleveland covers approximately half the island.
