= Yunaska Island =

Alaskan island in the Bering Sea

Native name: Yunaska Island
- Interactive map of Yunaska Island

Geography
- Coordinates: 52.629°N 170.700°W

Administration
- United States
- State: Alaska

Demographics
- Population: 0

Location in Alaska

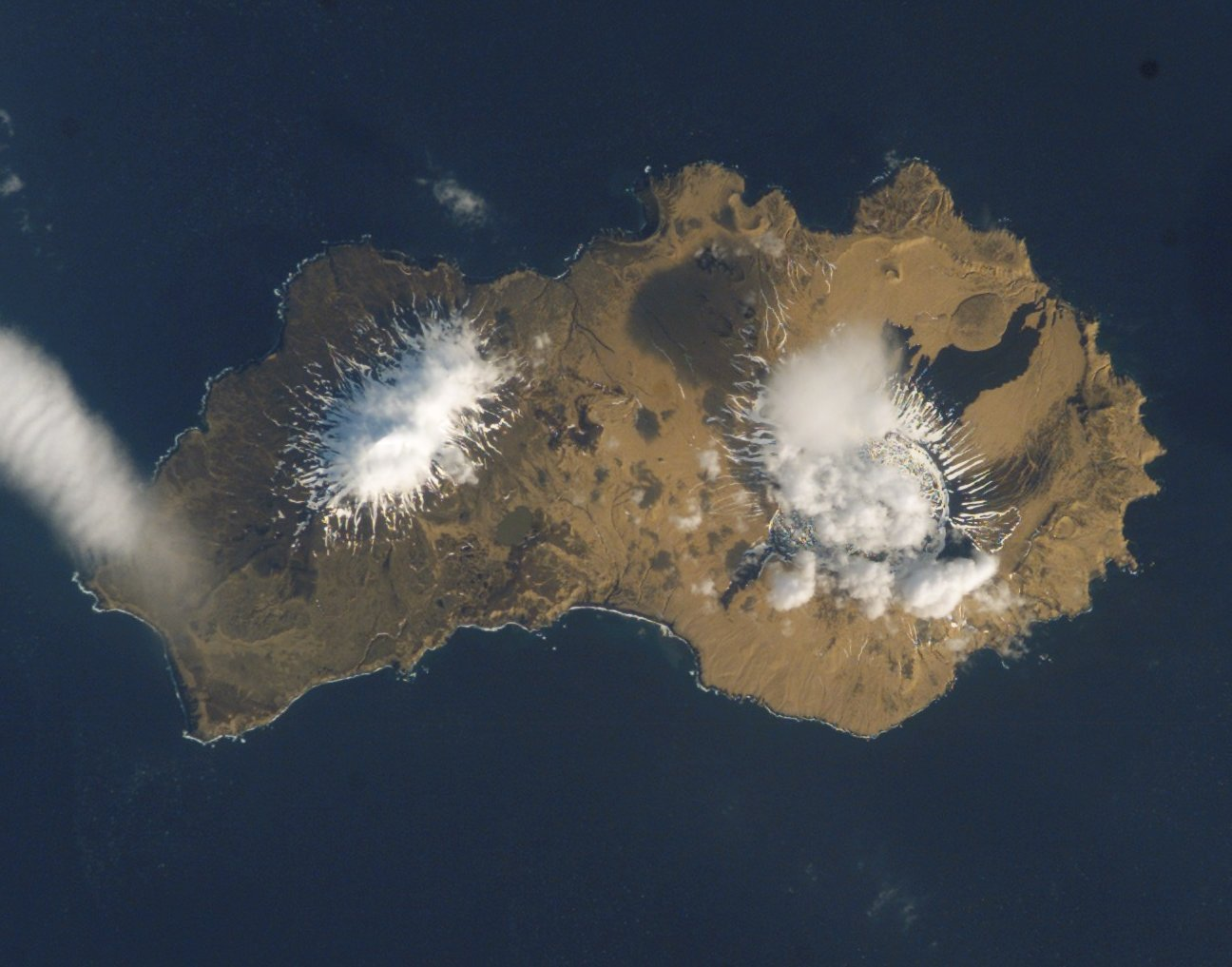
Yunaska Island

Yunaska (Aleut: Yunax̂sxa; Russian: Юнаска) is an uninhabited island which is the largest of the Islands of Four Mountains group in the Aleutian Islands of southwestern Alaska, United States. It has a land area of 66.834 square miles (173.099 square kilometres) according to the 2000 census.

The island comprises two volcanic mountains, with a valley between. The western mountain is composed of four overlapping and eroded stratovolcanoes, with a cinder cone field at the western end. It has not been historically active. The eastern mountain is a large shield volcano with two overlapping summit calderas, which last erupted in 1937.
