= List of the highest islands of North America =

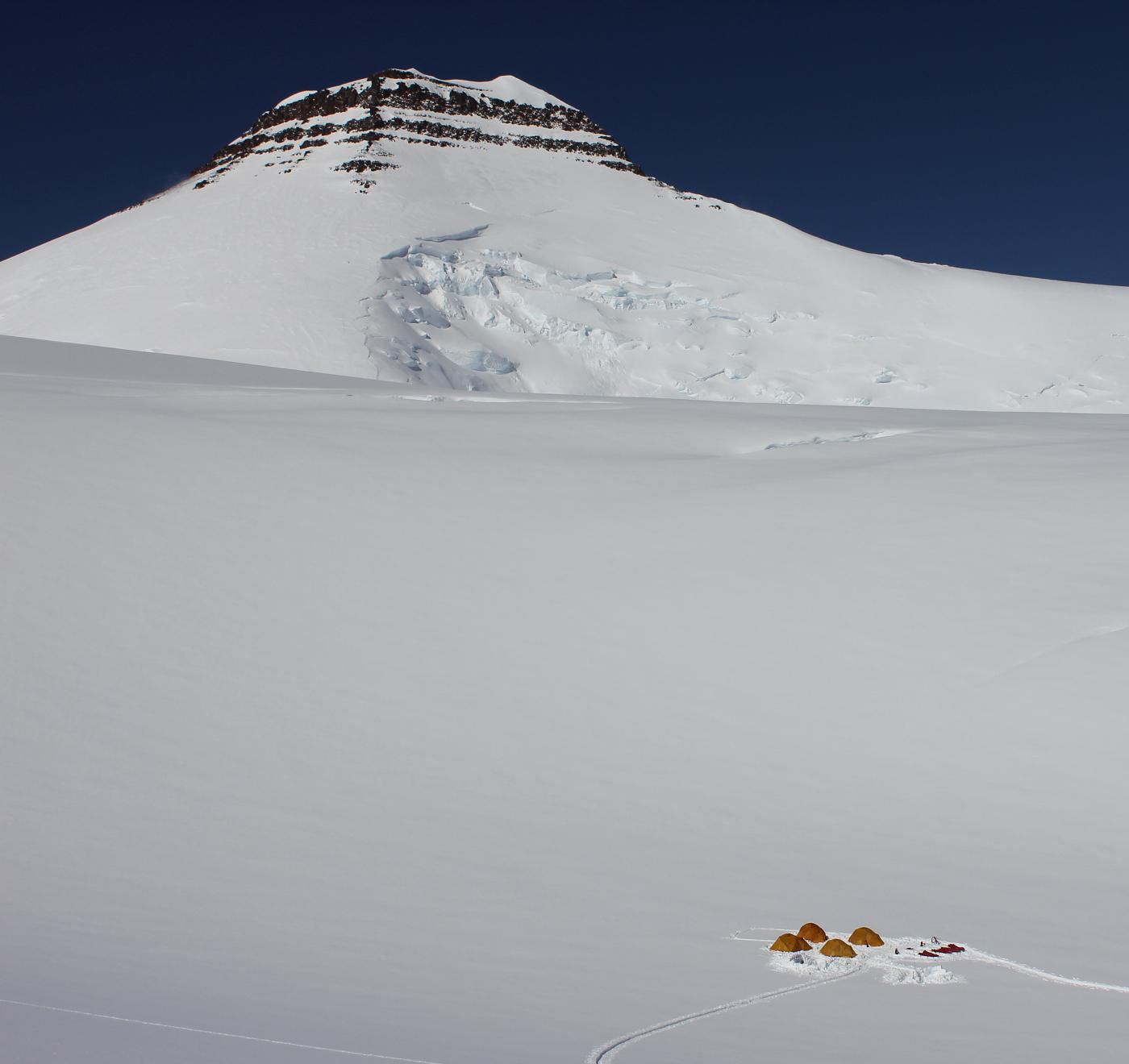
The summit of Gunnbjørn Fjeld is the highest point of the Island of Greenland, Kalaallit Nunaat, the Kingdom of Denmark, and the entire Arctic.

The following sortable table comprises the 76 highest ocean islands of greater North America. Each of these islands rises at least 1000 meters (3281 feet) above the sea.

This article defines the ocean islands of greater North America to include the coastal islands of North America, the islands of the Caribbean Sea, the Lucayan Archipelago, the islands of Greenland (Kalaallit Nunaat), the islands of Canada, and the islands of Alaska. The Hawaiian Islands are not included because they are considered part of Oceania.

== Highest islands ==
Greenland and Hispaniola rise above 3000 meters (9843 feet). Eleven islands rise above 2000 meters (6562 feet), and the following 76 islands rise above 1000 meters (3281 feet).

The 76 highest ocean islands of greater North America
Rank	Island	Region	Summit	Elevation	Location
1	Island of Greenland	Greenland	Gunnbjørn Fjeld (Note: The summit of Gunnbjørn Fjeld is the highest point of the Island of Greenland, Kalaallit Nunaat, the Kingdom of Denmark, and the entire Arctic.) (Note: Gunnbjørn Fjeld is the easternmost summit of its elevation in greater North America.)	3694 m 12,119 ft	68.9184°N 29.8991°W
2	Island of Hispaniola	Dominican Republic; Haiti	Pico Duarte (Note: The summit of Pico Duarte is the highest point of the Dominican Republic, the Island of Hispaniola, and all islands of the Caribbean Sea.)	3098 m 10,164 ft	19.0231°N 70.9977°W
3	Unimak Island	Alaska	Shishaldin Volcano (Note: The summit of Shishaldin Volcano is the highest point of Unimak Island and the Aleutian Islands.) (Note: Shishaldin Volcano is the westernmost summit of its elevation in Alaska, the United States, and greater North America.)	2869 m 9,414 ft	54.7554°N 163.9709°W
4	Ellesmere Island	Nunavut	Barbeau Peak (Note: The summit of Barbeau Peak is the highest point of Ellesmere Island and Nunavut of Canada.) (Note: Barbeau Peak is the northernmost ultra-prominent summit of Canada and greater North America.)	2616 m 8,583 ft	81.9148°N 75.0093°W
5	Island of Jamaica	Jamaica	Blue Mountain Peak (Note: The summit of Blue Mountain Peak is the highest point of the island and the nation of Jamaica.) (Note: Blue Mountain Peak is the southernmost and westernmost 2000-meter (6562-foot) summit and ultra-prominent summit of the Caribbean.)	2256 m 7,402 ft	18.0465°N 76.5788°W
6	Axel Heiberg Island	Nunavut	Outlook Peak (Note: The summit of Outlook Peak is the highest point of Axel Heiberg Island.)	2210 m 7,251 ft	79.7397°N 91.4061°W
7	Vancouver Island	British Columbia	Golden Hinde (Note: The summit of Golden Hinde is the highest point of Vancouver Island.)	2197 m 7,208 ft	49.6627°N 125.7470°W
8	Umnak Island	Alaska	Mount Vsevidof (Note: The summit of Mount Vsevidof is the highest point of Umnak Island and the Fox Islands.) (Note: Mount Vsevidof is the westernmost 2000-meter (6562-foot) summit of Alaska, the United States, and greater North America.)	2149 m 7,051 ft	53.1256°N 168.6938°W
9	Baffin Island	Nunavut	Mount Odin (Note: The summit of Mount Odin is the highest point of Baffin Island.) (Note: Mount Odin is the easternmost summit of its elevation in Canada.)	2143 m 7,031 ft	66.5468°N 65.4289°W
10	Upernivik	Greenland	Palup Qaqa	2105 m 6,906 ft	71.3333°N 52.8167°W
11	Island of Milne Land	Greenland	Milne Land high point	2050 m 6,726 ft	70.8194°N 26.5956°W
12	Island of Cuba	Cuba	Pico Turquino (Note: The summit of Pico Turquino is the highest point of the island and Republic of Cuba.) (Note: Pico Turquino is the northernmost and westernmost ultra-prominent summit of the Caribbean.)	1974 m 6,476 ft	19.9898°N 76.8360°W
13	Bylot Island	Nunavut	Angilaaq Mountain (Note: The summit of Angilaaq Mountain is the highest point of Bylot Island.)	1944 m 6,378 ft	73.2298°N 78.6230°W
14	Devon Island	Nunavut	Devon Ice Cap high point (Note: The summit of Devon Ice Cap high point is the highest point of Devon Island.)	1920 m 6,300 ft	75.3429°N 82.6186°W
15	Disko Island	Greenland	Pyramiden (Note: The summit of Pyramiden is the highest point of Disko Island.) (Note: Pyramiden is the westernmost summit of its elevation in the Greenland.)	1904 m 6,247 ft	70.1195°N 53.3890°W
16	Ymer Island	Greenland	Angelin Bjerg (Note: The summit of Angelin Bjerg is the highest point of Ymer Island.)	1900 m 6,234 ft	73.1667°N 24.3167°W
17	Traill Island	Greenland	Traill Island high point	1884 m 6,181 ft	72.7167°N 24.0667°W
18	Tanaga Island	Alaska	Tanaga Volcano (Note: The summit of Tanaga Volcano is the highest point of Tanaga Island and the Andreanof Islands.) (Note: Tanaga Volcano is the westernmost summit of its elevation in Alaska, the United States, and greater North America.)	1806 m 5,925 ft	51.8838°N 178.1429°W
19	Unalaska Island	Alaska	Makushin Volcano (Note: The summit of Makushin Volcano is the highest point of Unalaska Island.)	1800 m 5,905 ft	53.8782°N 166.9299°W
20	Island of Storo	Greenland	Storo high point	1770 m 5,807 ft	70.8333°N 27.4833°W
21	Qeqertaq Island	Greenland	Snehaetten (Note: The summit of Snehaetten is the highest point of the Qeqertaq Island.)	1765 m 5,791 ft	71.6542°N 53.1641°W
22	Great Sitkin Island	Alaska	Great Sitkin Volcano (Note: The summit of Great Sitkin Volcano is the highest point of Great Sitkin Island.)	1740 m 5,710 ft	52.0763°N 176.1108°W
23	Island of Skjoldungen	Greenland	Azimuthbjerg (Note: The summit of Azimuthbjerg is the highest point of the island of Skjoldungen.)	1738 m 5,702 ft	63.4552°N 41.8508°W
24	Geographical Society Island	Greenland	Svedenborg Bjerg (Note: The summit of Svedenborg Bjerg is the highest point of Geographical Society Island.)	1730 m 5,676 ft	72.9436°N 24.3412°W
25	Chuginadak Island	Alaska	Mount Cleveland (Note: The summit of Mount Cleveland is the highest point of Chuginadak Island.)	1730 m 5,675 ft	52.8230°N 169.9465°W
26	Agpat Island	Greenland	Appaalik (Note: The summit of Appaalik is the highest point of Agpat Island.)	1711 m 5,614 ft	70.9474°N 51.9918°W
27	King Island	British Columbia	Farquhar Peak (Note: The summit of Farquhar Peak is the highest point of King Island.)	1679 m 5,509 ft	52.3216°N 127.3065°W
28	Sillem Island	Nunavut	Sillem Peak (Note: The summit of Sillem Peak is the highest point of Sillem Island.)	1660 m 5,446 ft	71.0018°N 71.8531°W
29	Baranof Island	Alaska	Veniaminof Peak (Note: The summit of Veniaminof Peak is the highest point of Baranof Island.)	1643 m 5,390 ft	57.0151°N 134.9882°W
30	Carlisle Island	Alaska	Carlisle Volcano (Note: The summit of Carlisle Volcano is the highest point of Carlisle Island.)	1610 m 5,283 ft	52.8913°N 170.0580°W
31	Salliaruseq Island	Greenland	Salliaruseq high point	1610 m 5,282 ft	64.3913°N 51.1134°W
32	Clavering Island	Greenland	Clavering Island high point	1604 m 5,262 ft	74.3667°N 21.1833°W
33	East Redonda Island	British Columbia	Mount Addenbroke (Note: The summit of Mount Addenbroke is the highest point of East Redonda Island and the Inside Passage Islands.)	1591 m 5,220 ft	50.2316°N 124.6861°W
34	Gareloi Island	Alaska	Gareloi Volcano (Note: The summit of Gareloi Volcano is the highest point of Gareloi Island.) (Note: Gareloi Volcano is the westernmost ultra-prominent summit of Alaska, the United States, and greater North America.)	1573 m 5,160 ft	51.7880°N 178.7940°W
35	Island of Sangmissoq	Greenland	Sangmissoq high point (Note: Sangmissoq high point is the southernmost 1000-meter (3281-foot) summit of Greenland.)	1549 m 5,082 ft	60.0502°N 43.9164°W
36	Atka Island	Alaska	Korovin Volcano (Note: The summit of Korovin Volcano is the highest point of Atka Island.)	1533 m 5,030 ft	52.3816°N 174.1653°W
37	Admiralty Island	Alaska	Kootznoowoo Peak (Note: The summit of Kootznoowoo Peak is the highest point of Admiralty Island.)	1478 m 4,850 ft	57.7891°N 134.4546°W
38	île de Basse-Terre	Guadeloupe	La Grande Soufrière (Note: The summit of La Grande Soufrière is the highest point of île de Basse-Terre and the French Région Guadeloupe.) (Note: La Grande Soufrière is the southernmost and easternmost summit of its elevation in the Caribbean.)	1467 m 4,813 ft	16.0449°N 61.6638°W
39	Island of Dominica	Dominica	Morne Diablotins (Note: The summit of Morne Diablotins is the highest point of the island and Commonwealth of Dominica.) (Note: Morne Diablotins is the southernmost summit of its elevation in the Caribbean.)	1447 m 4,747 ft	15.5040°N 61.3981°W
40	Revillagigedo Island	Alaska	Mount Reid (Note: The summit of Mount Reid is the highest point of Revillagigedo Island.)	1400 m 4,592 ft	55.7065°N 131.2472°W
41	Island of Martinique	Martinique	Montagne Pelée (Note: The summit of Montagne Pelée is the highest point of the island and French insular region of Martinique.) (Note: Montagne Pelée is the southernmost and easternmost summit of its elevation in the Caribbean.)	1395 m 4,577 ft	14.8092°N 61.1654°W
42	Kodiak Island	Alaska	Koniag Peak (Note: The summit of Koniag Peak is the highest point of Kodiak Island.)	1378 m 4,520 ft	57.3548°N 153.3235°W
43	Island of Puerto Rico	Puerto Rico	Cerro de Punta (Note: The summit of Cerro de Punta is the highest point of the island and Commonwealth of Puerto Rico.)	1337.8 m 4,389 ft	18.1722°N 66.5917°W
44	Ammassalik Island	Greenland	Ammassalik Island high point	1335 m 4,380 ft	65.8343°N 37.6118°W
45	Herbert Island	Alaska	Herbert Volcan (Note: The summit of Herbert Volcan is the highest point of Herbert Island.)	1311 m 4,300 ft	52.7405°N 170.1142°W
46	Isla Guadalupe	Baja California	Isla Guadalupe high point (Note: The summit of Isla Guadalupe is the westernmost 1000-meter (3281-foot) summit of México.)	1310 m 4,298 ft	29.1016°N 118.3132°W
47	Kanaga Island	Alaska	Mount Kanaga (Note: The summit of Mount Kanaga is the highest point of Kanaga Island.)	1307 m 4,287 ft	51.9238°N 177.1623°W
48	Akutan Island	Alaska	Mount Akutan (Note: The summit of Mount Akutan is the highest point of Akutan Island.)	1296 m 4,251 ft	54.1330°N 165.9854°W
49	Island of Saint Vincent	Saint Vincent and the Grenadines	La Soufrière (Note: The summit of La Soufrière is the highest point of the island of Saint Vincent and the nation of Saint Vincent and the Grenadines.) (Note: La Soufrière is the southernmost 1000-meter (3281-foot) summit of the Caribbean.)	1234 m 4,049 ft	13.3477°N 61.1761°W
50	Augustine Island	Alaska	Augustine Volcano (Note: The summit of Augustine Volcano is the highest point of Augustine Island.)	1227 m 4,025 ft	59.3622°N 153.4330°W
51	Semisopochnoi Island	Alaska	Anvil Peak (Note: The summit of Anvil Peak is the highest point of Semisopochnoi Island and the Rat Islands.) (Note: Anvil Peak is the westernmost summit of its elevation in Alaska, the United States, and greater North America.)	1221 m 4,007 ft	51.9859°N 179.6021°E
52	Kiska Island	Alaska	Kiska Volcano (Note: The summit of Kiska Volcano is the highest point of Kiska Island.) (Note: Kiska Volcano is the westernmost 1000-meter (3281-foot) summit of Alaska, the United States, and greater North America.)	1220 m 4,004 ft	52.1027°N 177.6030°E
53	Prince of Wales Island	Alaska	Prince of Wales Island high point	1218 m 3,996 ft	55.5373°N 132.8773°W
54	Etolin Island	Alaska	Etolin Island high point	1207 m 3,960 ft	56.1196°N 132.3253°W
55	Kupreanof Island	Alaska	Sherman Peak (Note: The summit of Sherman Peak is the highest point of Kupreanof Island.)	1204 m 3,950 ft	56.8969°N 133.0476°W
56	Isla Cedros	Baja California	Isla Cedros high point	1200 m 3,937 ft	28.1301°N 115.2206°W
57	Adak Island	Alaska	Mount Moffett (Note: The summit of Mount Moffett is the highest point of Adak Island.)	1196 m 3,924 ft	51.9363°N 176.7409°W
58	Chichagof Island	Alaska	Chichagof Island high point	1191 m 3,909 ft	57.8149°N 135.1801°W
59	Moresby Island	British Columbia	Mount Moresby (Note: The summit of Mount Moresby is the highest point of Moresby Island.)	1164 m 3,819 ft	53.0191°N 132.0856°W
60	Segula Island	Alaska	Segula Peak (Note: The summit of Segula Peak is the highest point of Segula Island.)	1163 m 3,817 ft	52.0147°N 178.1356°E
61	Saint Christopher Island (Island of Saint Kitts)	Saint Kitts and Nevis	Mount Liamuiga (Note: The summit of Mount Liamuiga is the highest point of the island of Saint Kitts and the Federation of Saint Kitts and Nevis.) (Mount Misery)	1156 m 3,793 ft	17.3685°N 62.8029°W
62	Chagulak Island	Alaska	Chagulak Volcano (Note: The summit of Chagulak Volcano is the highest point of Chagulak Island.)	1143 m 3,750 ft	52.5711°N 171.1388°W
63	Graham Island	British Columbia	Mount La Pérouse (Note: The summit of Mount La Pérouse is the highest point of Graham Island.)	1127 m 3,698 ft	53.2240°N 132.5110°W
64	Princess Royal Island	British Columbia	Canoona Peak (Note: The summit of Canoona Peak is the highest point of Princess Royal Island.)	1104 m 3,622 ft	53.0048°N 128.5904°W
65	Pitt Island	British Columbia	Heavenor Peak (Note: The summit of Heavenor Peak is the highest point of Pitt Island.)	1099 m 3,606 ft	53.7167°N 129.9000°W
66	Annette Island	Alaska	Tamgas Mountain (Note: The summit of Tamgas Mountain is the highest point of Annette Island.)	1095 m 3,591 ft	55.0660°N 131.4077°W
67	Louise Island	British Columbia	Mount Kermode (Note: The summit of Mount Kermode is the highest point of Louise Island.)	1091 m 3,579 ft	52.9569°N 131.8577°W
68	Isla Ángel de la Guarda	Baja California	Isla Ángel de la Guarda high point	1090 m 3,576 ft	29.4571°N 113.5163°W
69	Kuiu Island	Alaska	Kuiu Island high point	1080 m 3,542 ft	56.8031°N 134.3800°W
70	Gribbell Island	British Columbia	Gribbel Peak (Note: The summit of Gribbel Peak is the highest point of Gribbell Island.)	1077 m 3,533 ft	53.3833°N 128.9667°W
71	Seguam Island	Alaska	Pyre Peak (Note: The summit of Pyre Peak is the highest point of Seguam Island.)	1054 m 3,458 ft	52.3159°N 172.5106°W
71	Douglas Island	Alaska	Mount Meek (Note: The summit of Mount Meek is the highest point of Douglas Island.)	1054 m 3,458 ft	58.2823°N 134.6043°W
73	Isla Socorro	Colima	Volcán Everman (Note: The summit of Volcán Everman is the highest point of Isla Socorro.)	1050 m 3,445 ft	18.8000°N 110.9833°W
74	West Redonda Island	British Columbia	Mount Perritt (Note: The summit of Mount Perritt is the highest point of West Redonda Island.)	1048 m 3,438 ft	50.2667°N 124.8833°W
75	Calvert Island	British Columbia	Mount Buxton (Note: The summit of Mount Buxton is the highest point of Calvert Island.)	1017 m 3,337 ft	51.6000°N 127.9833°W
76	Mitkof Island	Alaska	Crystal Mountain (Note: The summit of Crystal Mountain is the highest point of Mitkof Island.)	1011 m 3,317 ft	56.5844°N 132.8672°W

== Gallery ==
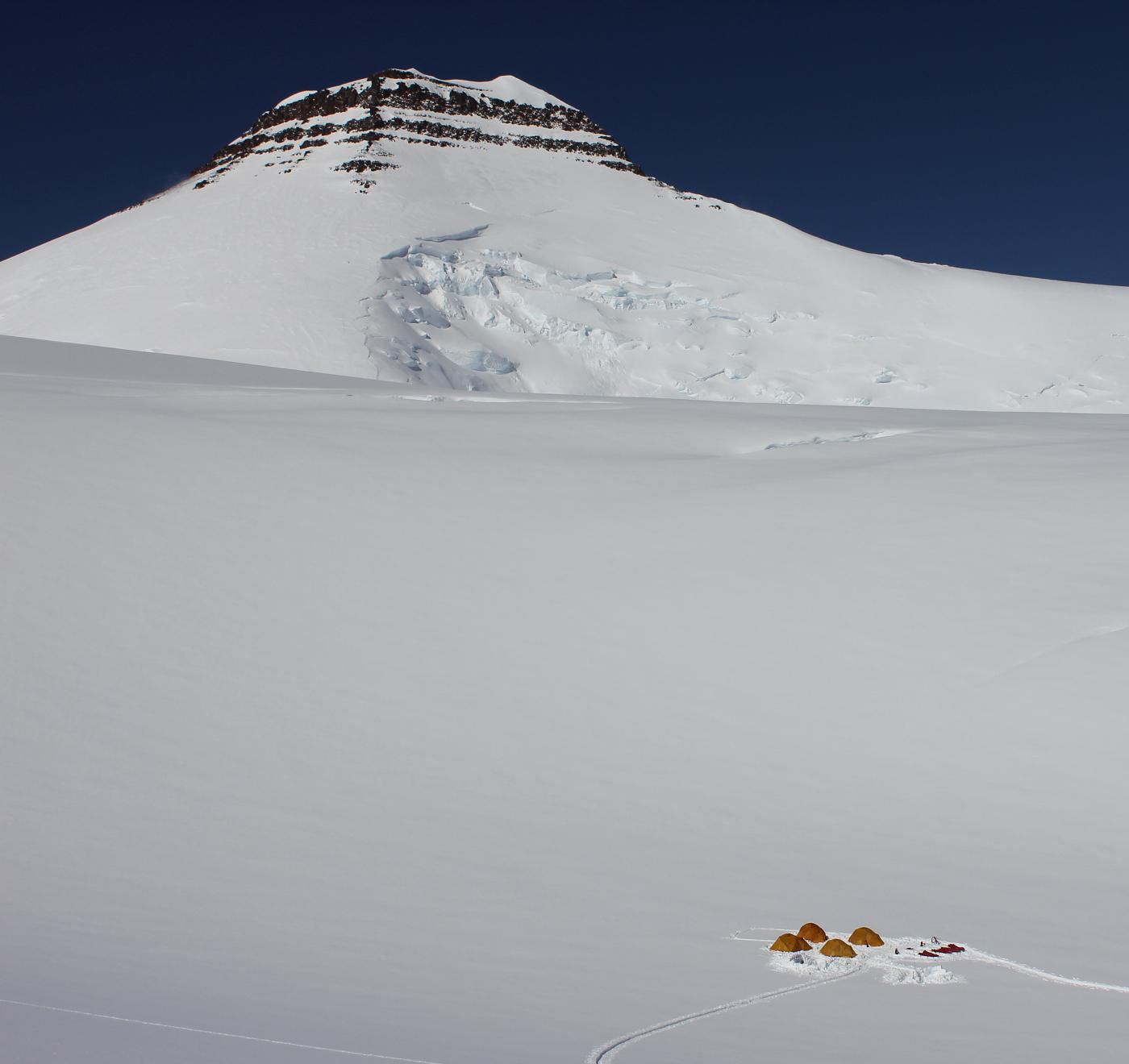
1. Gunnbjørn Fjeld is the highest summit of the Island of Greenland, Kalaallit Nunaat, the Kingdom of Denmark, and the entire Arctic.

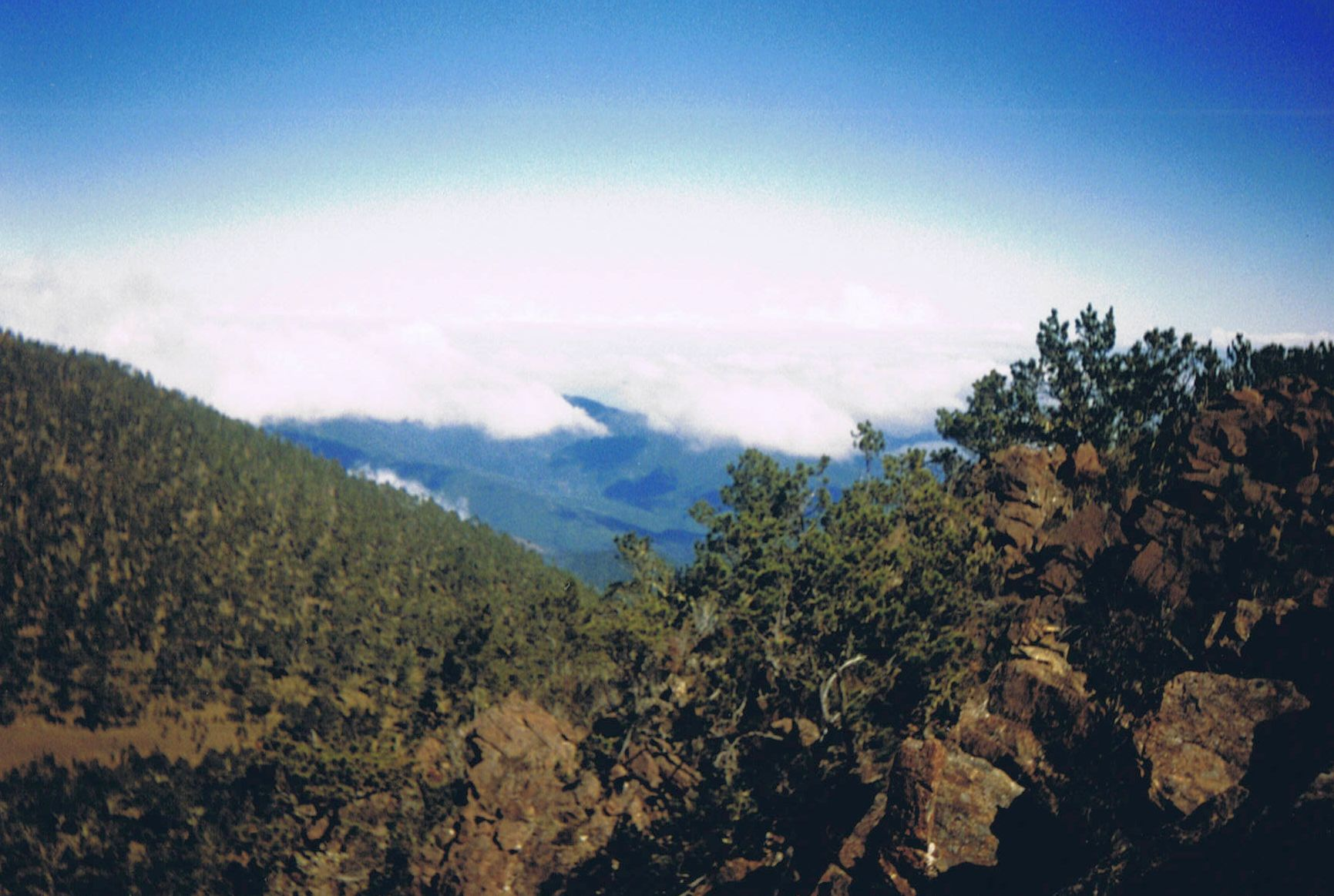
2. Pico Duarte is the highest summit in the Dominican Republic, the Island of Hispaniola, and the entire Caribbean.

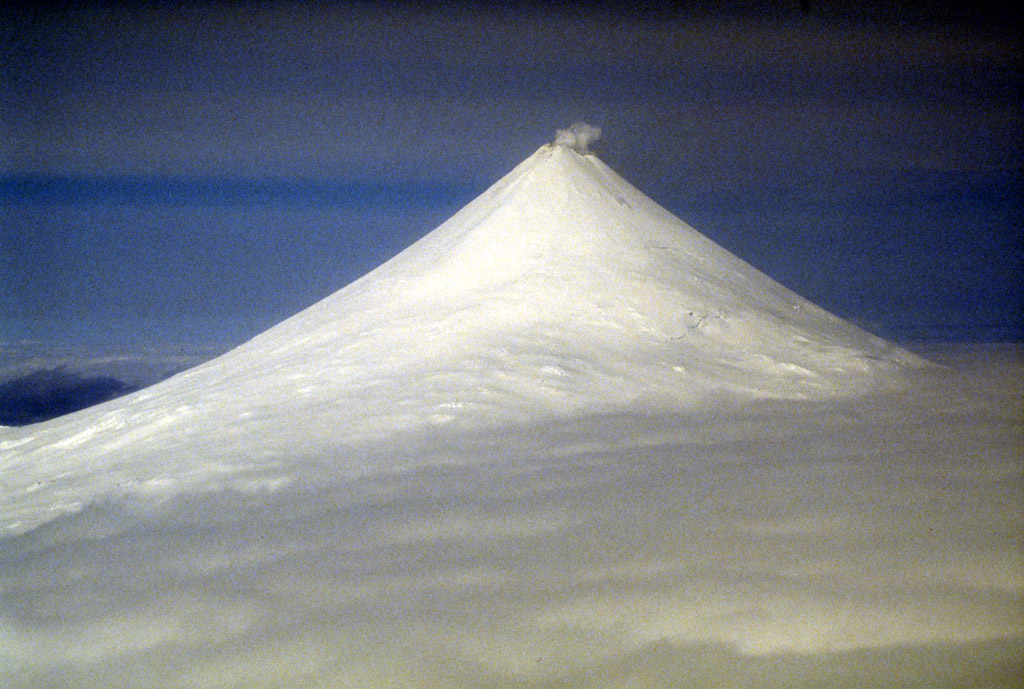
3. Shishaldin Volcano is the highest summit of Unimak Island and the Aleutian Islands of Alaska.

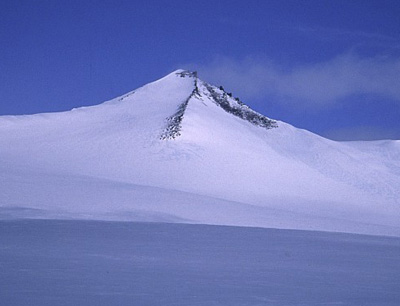
4. Barbeau Peak is the highest summit of Ellesmere Island and Nunavut.

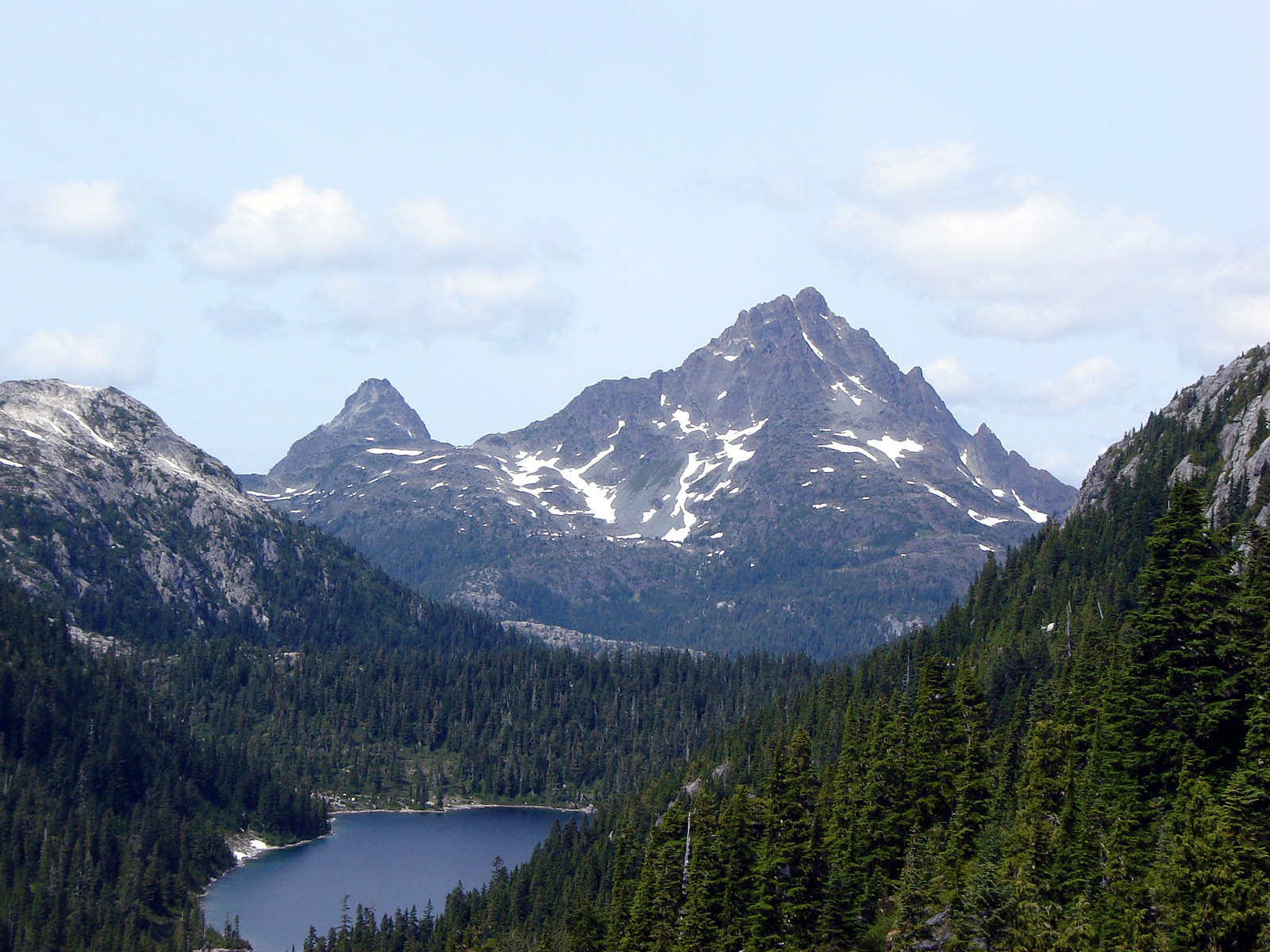
7. The Golden Hinde is the highest summit of Vancouver Island in British Columbia.

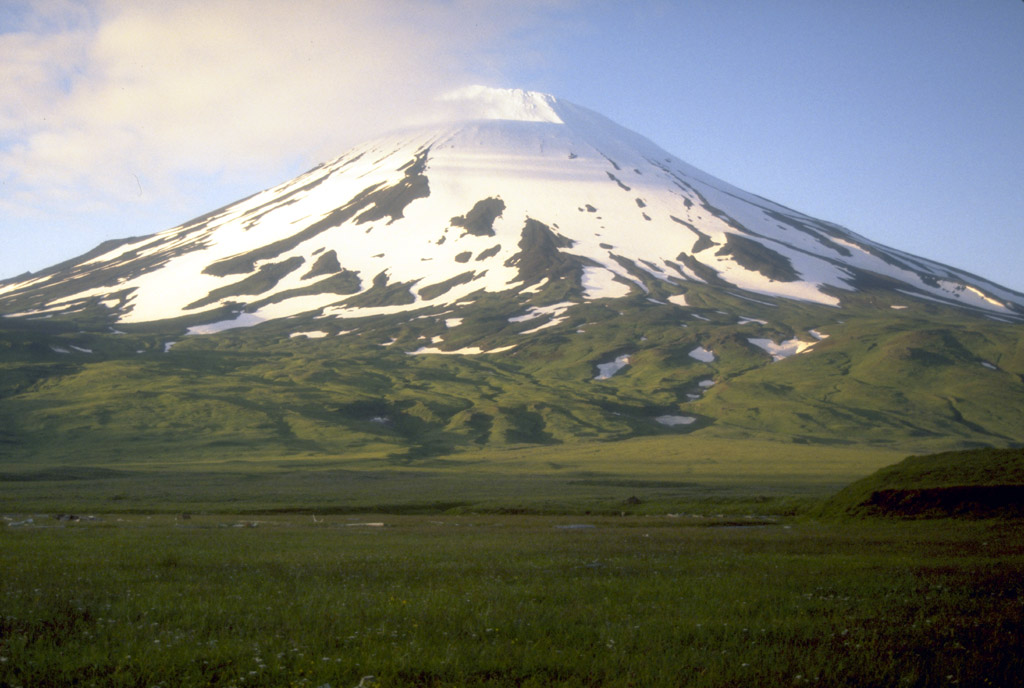
8. Mount Vsevidof is the highest summit of Umnak Island and the Fox Islands in the Aleutian Islands of Alaska.

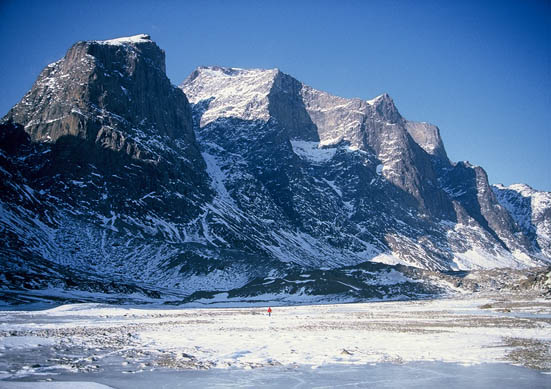
9. Mount Odin is the highest summit of Baffin Island in Nunavut.

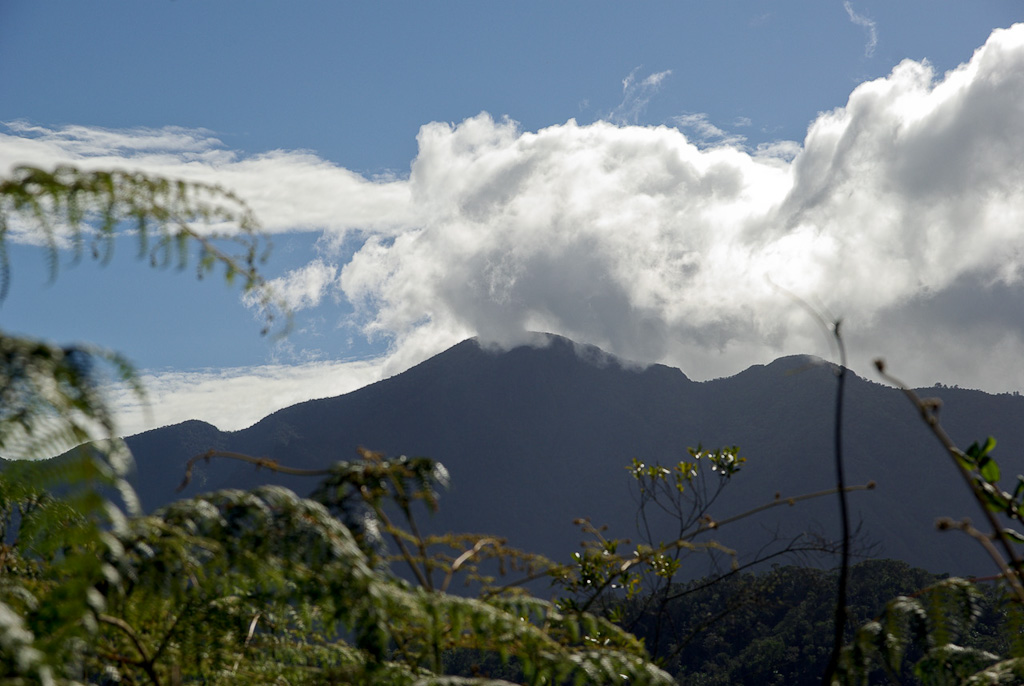
12. Pico Turquino is the highest summit of the island and Republic of Cuba.

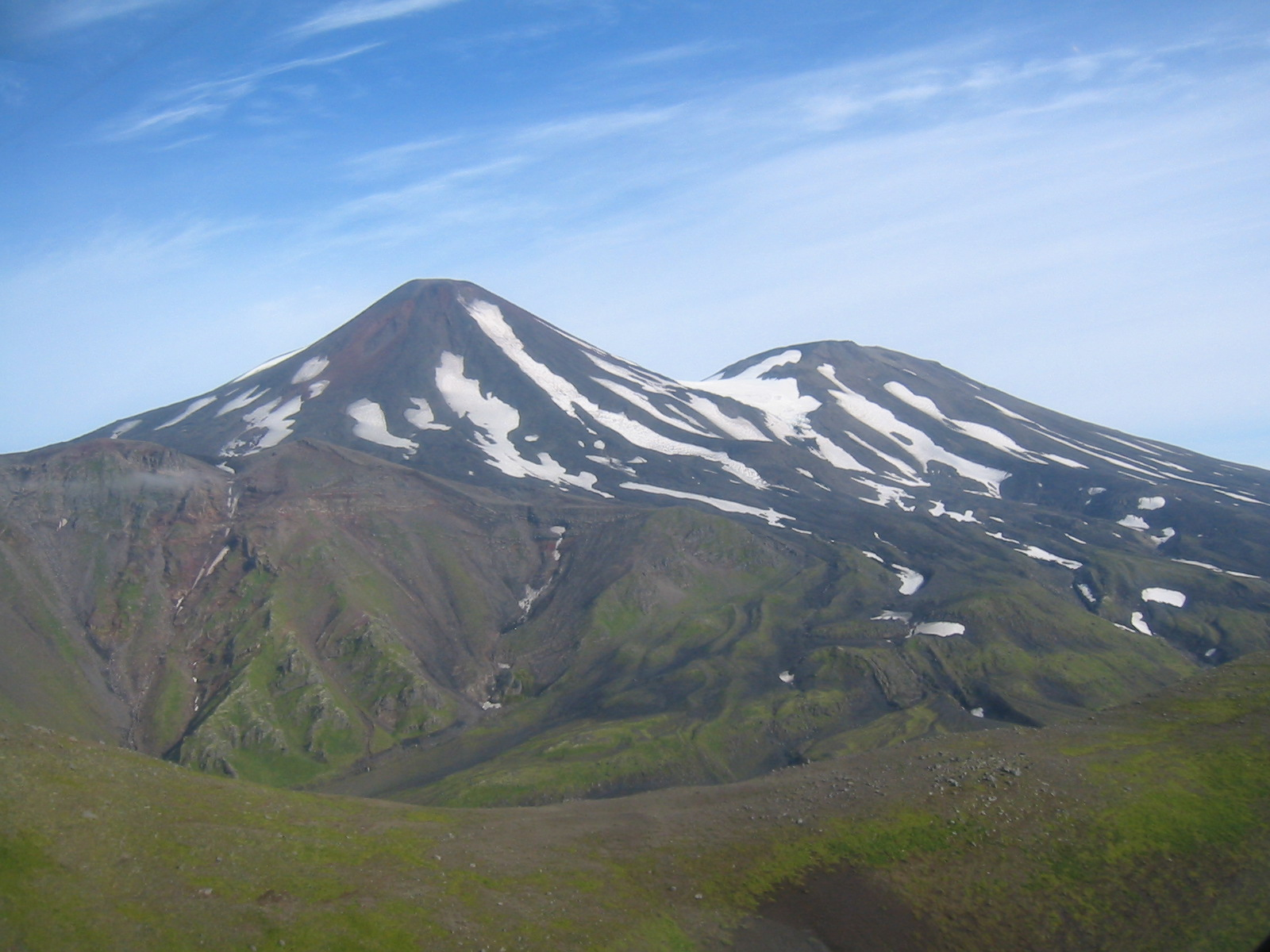
18. Tanaga Volcano is the highest summit of Tanaga Island and the Andreanof Islands in the Aleutian Islands of Alaska.

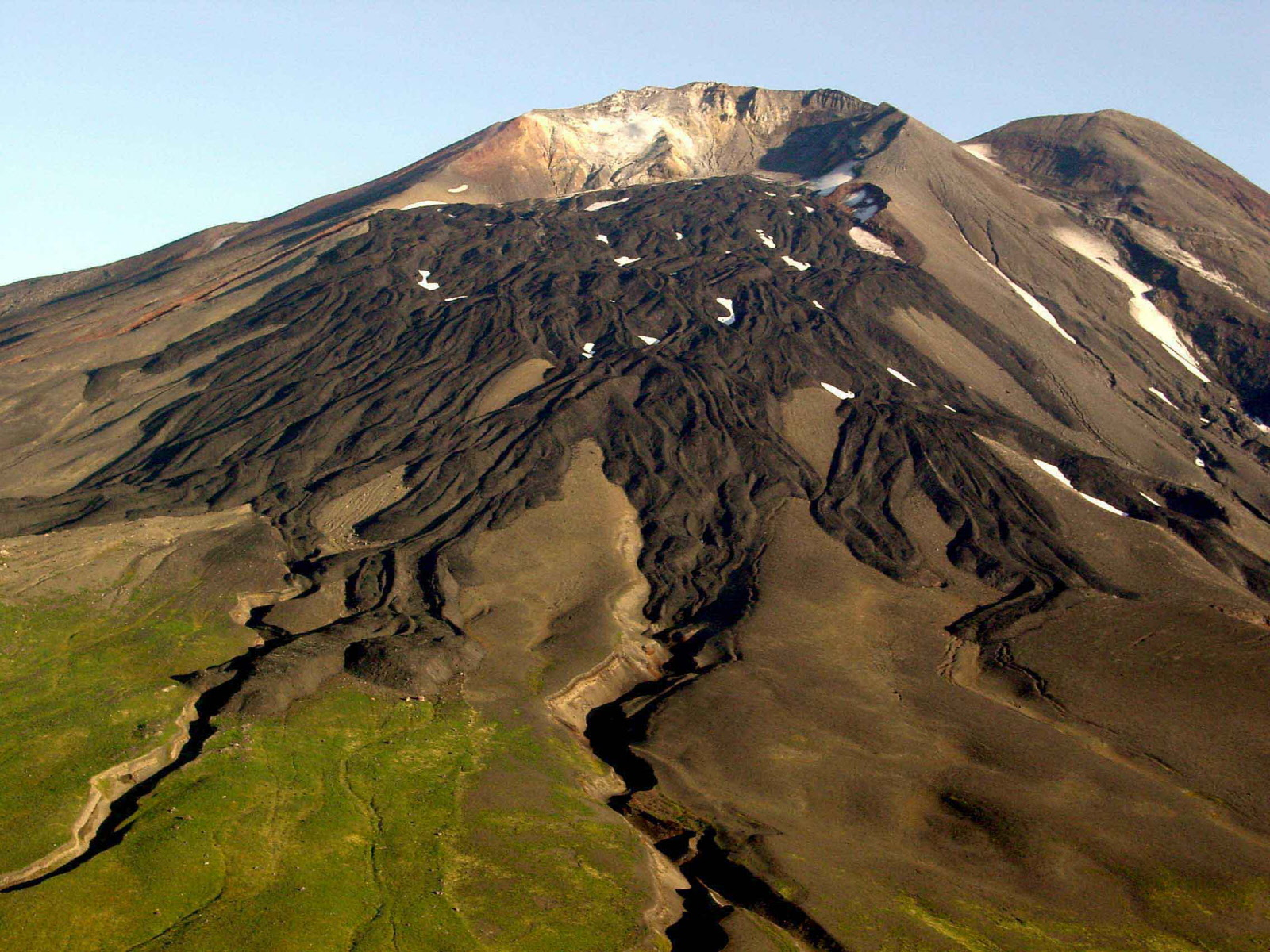
34. Gareloi Volcano is the apex of Gareloi Island in the Aleutian Islands of Alaska.

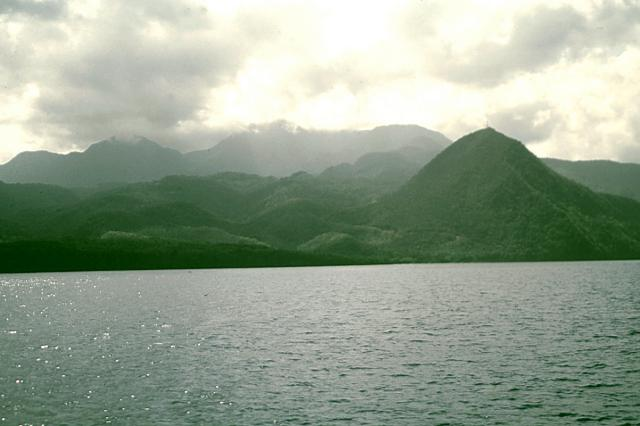
39. The active volcano Morne Diablotins is the highest summit of the island and Commonwealth of Dominica.

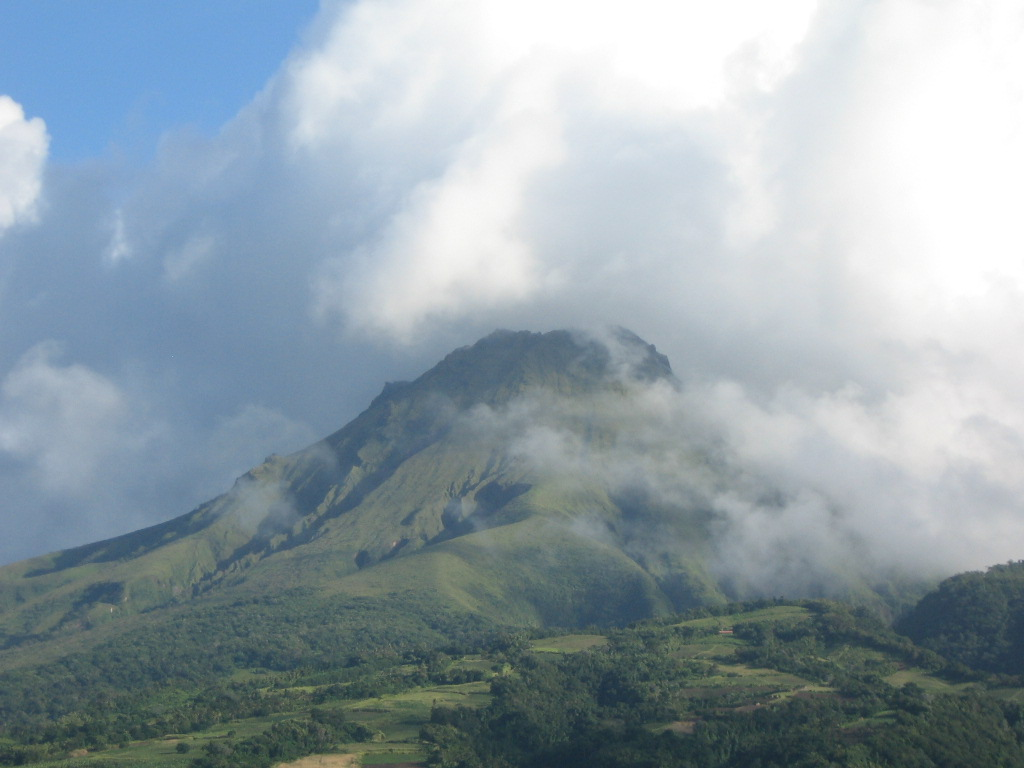
41. Montagne Pelée is the highest summit on the Island of Martinique and the French Région Martinique.

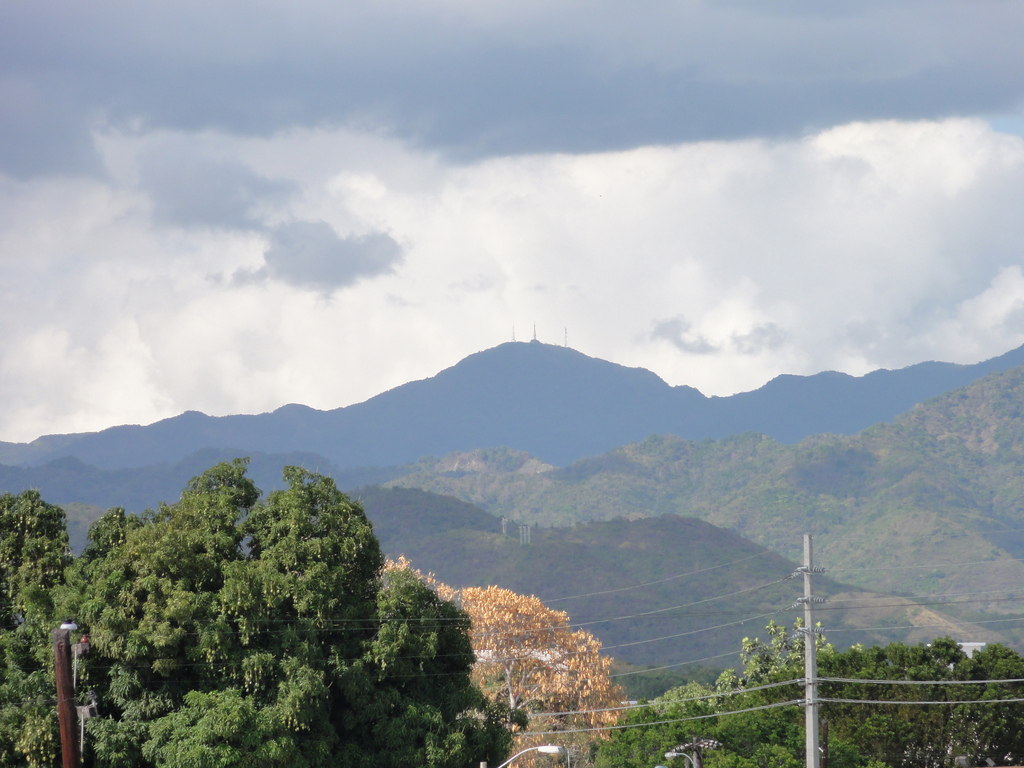
43. Cerro de Punta is the highest summit of the island and Commonwealth of Puerto Rico.

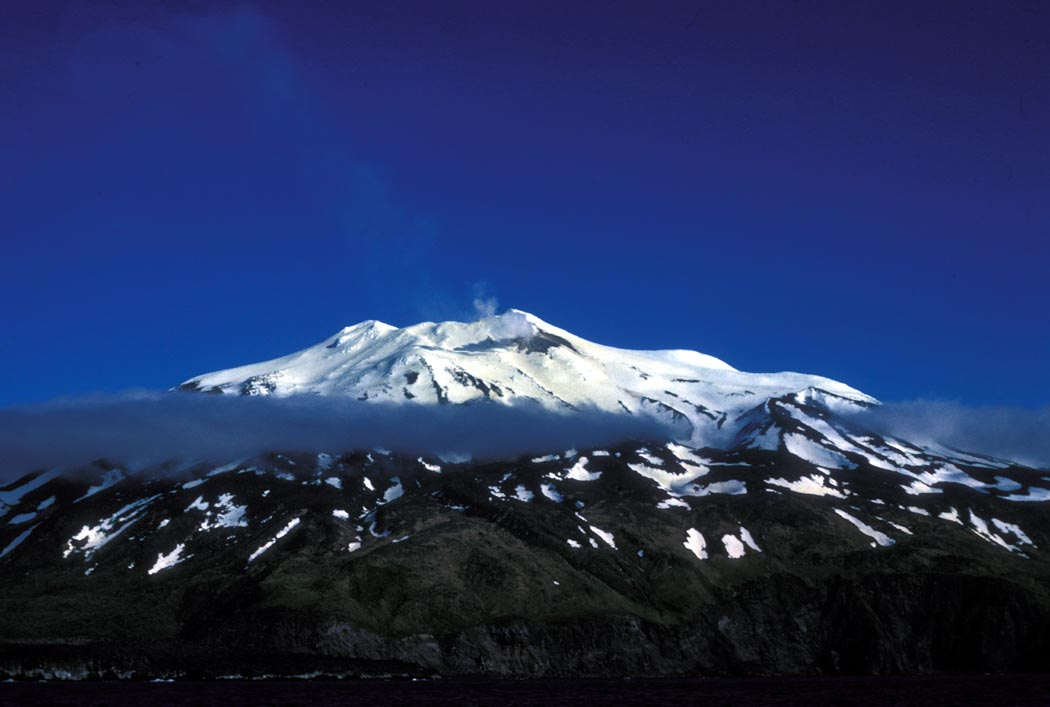
52. Kiska Volcano is the apex of Kiska Island in the Aleutian Islands of Alaska.

== See also ==
- North America
  - Geography of North America
    - List of islands of North America
      - List of the highest islands of North America
- Islands
- Mountains
- Volcanoes
