= Beatty Anchorage =

- Logging camp
- Location within British Columbia
- Coordinates: 53°1′49.5″N 131°54′10.6″W
- Country: Canada
- Province: British Columbia
- Islands: Haida Gwaii
- Island: Louise Island

Beatty Anchorage is a logging camp located on Louise Island, one of the Queen Charlotte Islands, now known as Haida Gwaii, in British Columbia, Canada.

== Background ==
It is one of three large logging camps remaining on the islands since the heyday of Sitka spruce logging during World War II, the other two being Moresby Camp and Aero Camp.
