= New Clew, British Columbia =

New Clew
- Location of New Clew in British Columbia
- Coordinates: 53°01′30″N 131°46′30″W
- Country: Canada
- Province: British Columbia
- Area codes: 250, 778

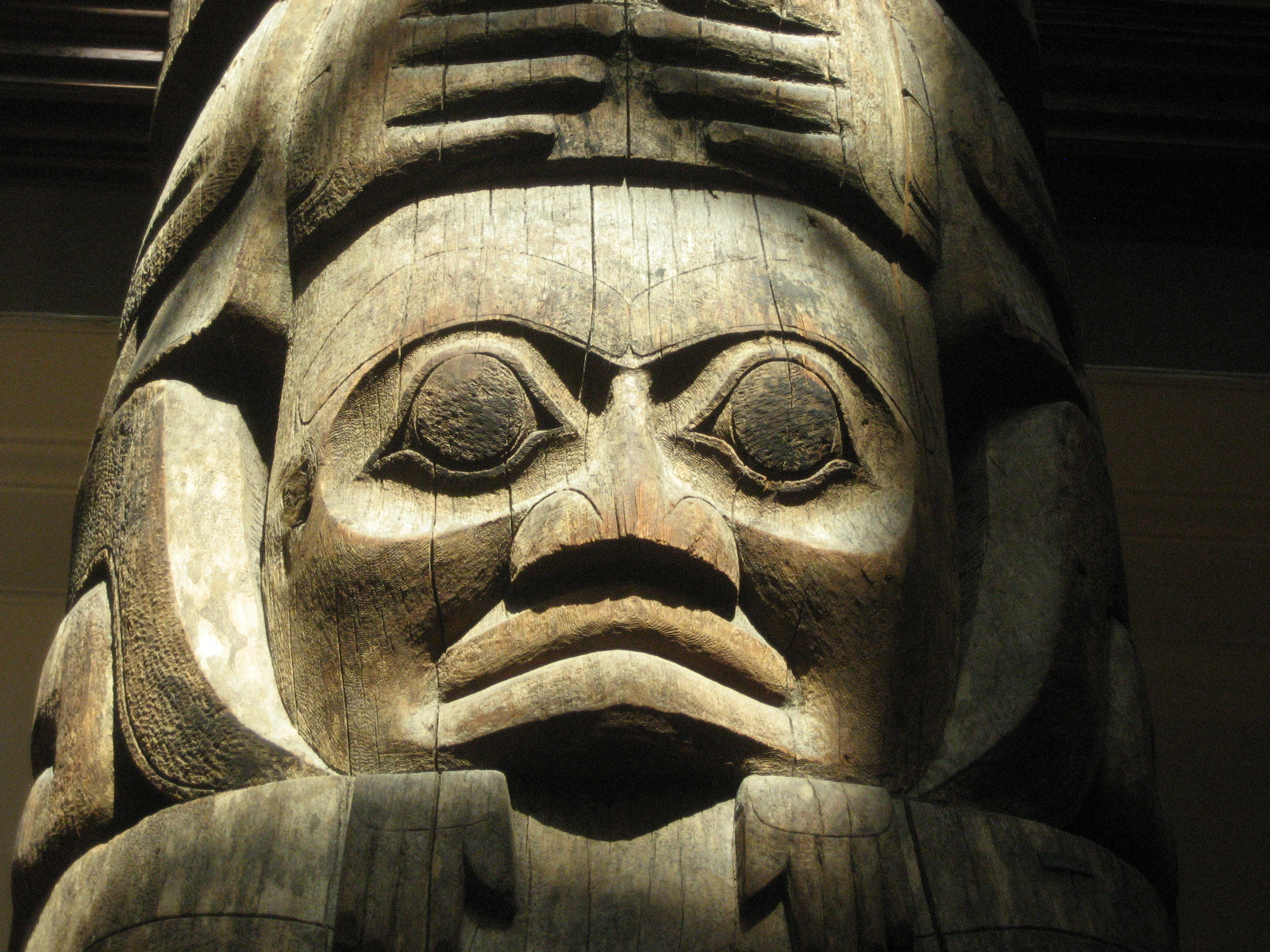
Detail of Haida totem pole from Tanu, Haida Gwaii (Museum of Archaeology and Anthropology, University of Cambridge)

New Clew, also Clue, Kloo, Kliew, Klue, Clew Indian Reserve, is a locality and First Nations reserve of the Haida people, located on the north shore of Louise Island, which is located in Cumshewa Inlet on Haida Gwaii, formerly known as the Queen Charlotte Islands, of the North Coast of British Columbia, Canada.

New Clew is believed to be the site of the historically important Haida village of Tanu or Tlanú, a National Historic Site of Canada which has been cited by anthropologist Wilson Duff as being "of historical importance". "Kloo" is the word in the Skidegate dialect of the Haida language for "canoe".

Across the inlet from New Clew is Cumshewa, which is near the site of another historical village, Djí-gua.

"...Kloo (Tlanú)... would seem to be a very modern town. In recent times the people of this town moved to a place where the so-called "Kloo Oil Works" were built, not far from the old site of Djí-gua, but after living there a few years, passed on the Skidegate." (Stanton, J.R., The Haida; Jesup Expedition, vol 5, pt 1, 1905, pp.96-97)

== See also ==
- Cumshewa, British Columbia
- List of Haida villages
