= Mount Takawangha =

Stratovolcano on Tanaga Island, Alaska

Takawangha
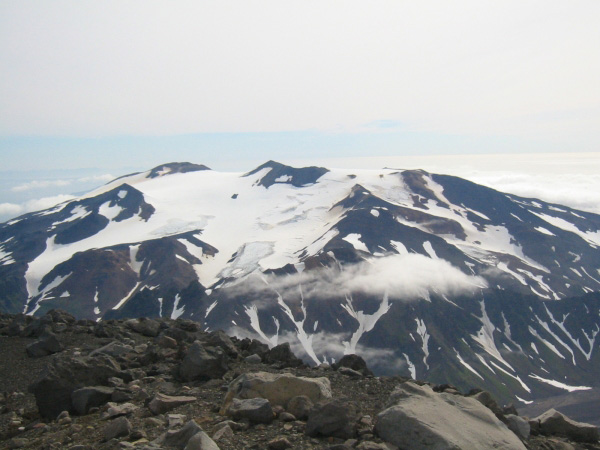
- Takawangha as seen from East Tanaga

Highest point
- Elevation: 4,754 ft (1,449 m)
- Coordinates: 51°52′09″N 178°00′51″W

Geography
- Location within Alaska
- Location: Alaska, United States

Geology
- Mountain type: Stratovolcano
- Volcanic arc: Aleutian Archipelago
- Last eruption: 1550?

Mount Takawangha is a stratovolcano located in Tanaga Island, Alaska. It sits in close proximity with another volcano known as Mount Tanaga, which shares the same name as the island itself. Older and more eroded volcanoes can also be found east of Takawangha. Its elevation is 4,754 ft (1,449 m), making it the second-highest peak on the island.

== Geology ==
Takawangha is a stratovolcano that may have last erupted in 1550CE. There are tephra cones in its crater and on its flanks. Takawangha's summit is mostly covered in ice, with the exception of four younger craters that have erupted in the past few thousand years.

There is a possibility that recent eruptions attributed to Mount Tanaga may have instead came from Takawangha.

== See also ==
- Tanaga (volcano)
- Tanaga Island
- Volcanoes in Alaska
