= Kanaga Island =

Coordinates: 51°44′21″N 177°26′38″W

Location in Alaska

Kanaga Island (Aleut: Kanaga; Russian: Остров Канага) is a part of the Andreanof Islands group of the Aleutian Islands in Alaska. The island measures 30 miles (48 km) long and between 4–8 miles (6.4–12.9 km) wide with an area of 142 sq mi (368 km^{2}), making it the 42nd largest island in the United States. The island's most notable feature is Mount Kanaga, a 4,288-foot-high (1,307 m) volcano which last erupted in 1995.

== Gallery ==
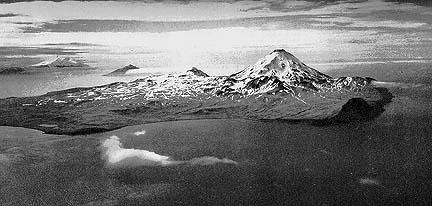
Kanaga Island. The volcanic Mount Kanaga is visible to the right.
