= Augustine Volcano =

Stratovolcano in Alaska

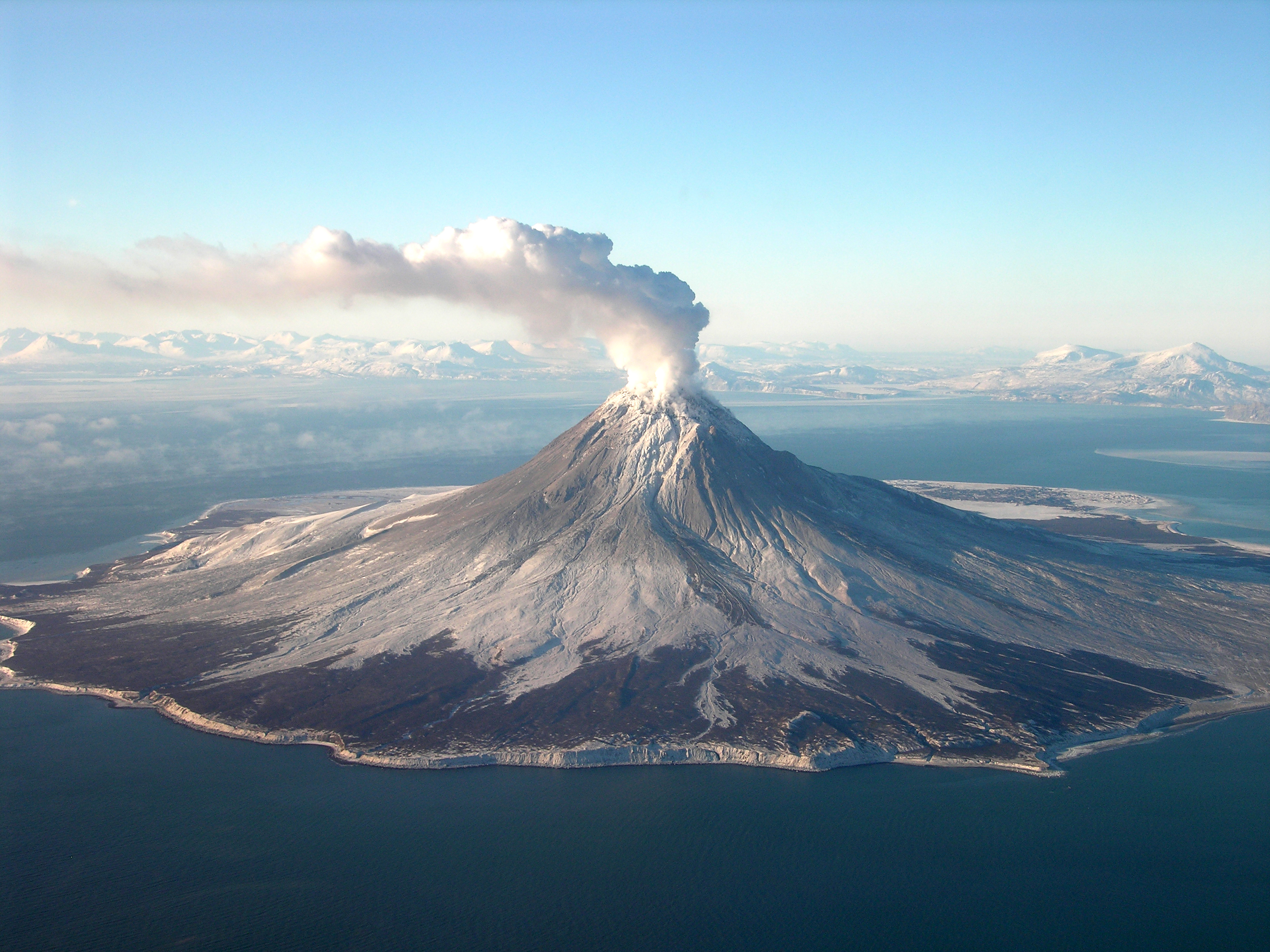
- A gas plume arising during its eruptive phase 2006

Highest point
- Elevation: 4,134 ft (1,260 m)
- Prominence: 4,130 ft (1,260 m)
- Listing: List of volcanoes in the United States
- Coordinates: 59°21′48″N 153°26′00″W

Naming
- Native name: Utakineq (Alutiiq); Chu Nula (Denaʼina)

Geography
- Location within Alaska
- Interactive map of Augustine Volcano
- Location: Cook Inlet, Alaska, U.S.
- Topo map: USGS Iliamna B-2

Geology
- Formed by: Subduction zone volcanism
- Rock age: more than 40,000 years
- Mountain type: Stratovolcano with lava domes
- Volcanic arc: Aleutian Arc
- Last eruption: 2006

Augustine Volcano (Sugpiaq: Utakineq; Dena'ina: Chu Nula) is a stratovolcano in Alaska consisting of a central complex of summit lava domes and flows surrounded by an apron of pyroclastic, lahar, avalanche, and ash deposits. The volcano forms Augustine Island, colloquially called Mount St. Augustine, in southwestern Cook Inlet in the Kenai Peninsula Borough of southcentral coastal Alaska, about 70 miles (113 km) west of Homer and about 175 miles (282 km) southwest of Anchorage.

The volcano is frequently active, with major eruptions recorded in 1883, 1935, 1963–64, 1976, 1986, and 2006. Minor eruptive events were reported in 1812, 1885, 1908, 1944, and 1971. The large eruptions are characterized by an explosive onset followed by the quieter effusion of lava. Augustine Island has a land area of 32.4 square miles (83.9 km^{2}), while West Island, just off Augustine's western shores, has 2 sq mi (5.2 km^{2}). The irregular coastline of Augustine Island is due to the repeated catastrophic collapse of the summit dome, forming debris avalanches down the flanks and into Cook Inlet.

The island is mainly made up of past eruption deposits. Scientists have been able to discern that past dome collapse has resulted in large avalanches.

Augustine Island has been explored for geothermal power development, and the state of Alaska awarded leases in 2025.

== Description and geologic history ==
The nearly circular uninhabited island formed by Augustine Volcano is 12 km (7.5 mi) wide east–west, 10 km (6.2 mi) north-south; a nearly symmetrical central summit peaks at altitude 4,134 feet (1,260 m).

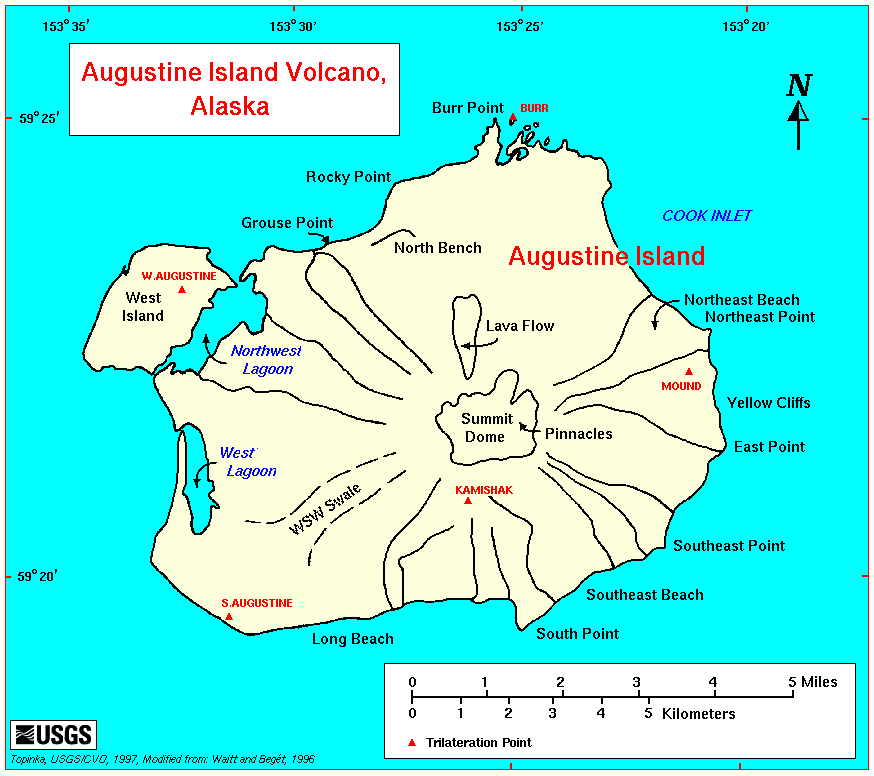
USGS map of Augustine Volcano island

Augustine's summit consists of several overlapping lava dome complexes formed during many historic and prehistoric eruptions. Most of the fragmental debris exposed along its slopes comprises angular blocks of dome-rock andesite, typically of cobble to boulder size but carrying clasts as large as 4 to 8 meters (13 to 26 ft), rarely as large as 30 meters (98 feet). The surface of such deposits is hummocky, a field of steep conical mounds and intervening depressions with many meters of local relief. En route to Katmai in 1913, Robert F. Griggs had briefly inferred landslide (debris avalanche) as the origin of Augustine's hummocky coastal topography about Burr Point, by geomorphic analogy with the hummocky and blocky deposit of a 1912 landslide near Katmai.

The hummocky deposits on Augustine's lower flanks resemble both topographically and lithologically those of the great landslide or debris avalanche that initiated the spectacular May 18, 1980, eruption of Mount St. Helens. The deposit of that landslide revealed the origin of coarse diamicts with hummocky topography at other strato volcanic cones. Since 1980 many hummocky coarsely fragmental deposits on Augustine's lower flanks have come to be interpreted as deposits of numerous great landslides and debris avalanches.

== Eruptive activity ==
January 22, 1976, and March 27, 1986, eruptions deposited ash over Anchorage and disrupted air traffic in southcentral Alaska.

On January 11, 1994, Augustine erupted at 13:44 and 14:13 UTC.

=== 2005–2006 ===
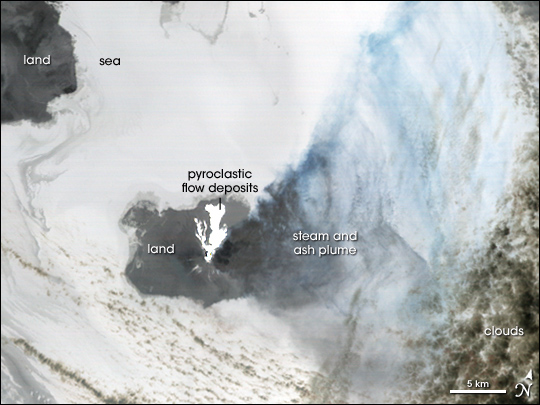
Thermal image after the January 2006 eruptions. White parts of the image are warmer than dark areas.

The eruption consisted of four phases, starting in April 2005 and continuing through March 2006. The precursory phase began as a slow, steady increase in microearthquake (Note: Microearthquakes are tiny earthquakes that suggest a volcanic eruption could possibly occur.) activity beneath the volcano on April 30, 2005. An earlier swarm in October 2004 developed seismicity rates that exceeded any observed since the 1986 eruption; however, the six-month-long period of quiescence between this swarm and April 30, 2005, makes any connection to the 2006 eruption uncertain. The number of located VT earthquakes slowly increased from an average of one to two per day in May 2005 to five to six per day in October 2005 to 15 per day in mid-December 2005. December 2 revealed the onset of a series of small phreatic explosions that were clearly recorded on the Augustine seismic network. The largest of these explosions occurred on December 10, 12, and 15. An observational overflight on December 12 revealed vigorous steaming from the summit area, a new vigorous fumarole on the summit's southern side at roughly 3,600 ft (1,100 m) elevation, and a light dusting of ash on the volcano's southern flanks. A strong plume of steam and gas extended to the southeast. The ash was sampled on December 20 and was found to be a mix of weathered and glassy particles; the latter appear to be remobilized 1986 tephra. Between December 12, 2005, and January 10, 2006, seismicity rates were strongly elevated, with more than 420 earthquakes located by the AVO. Much of this activity occurred in spasmodic bursts similar to those observed before the 1986 eruption.

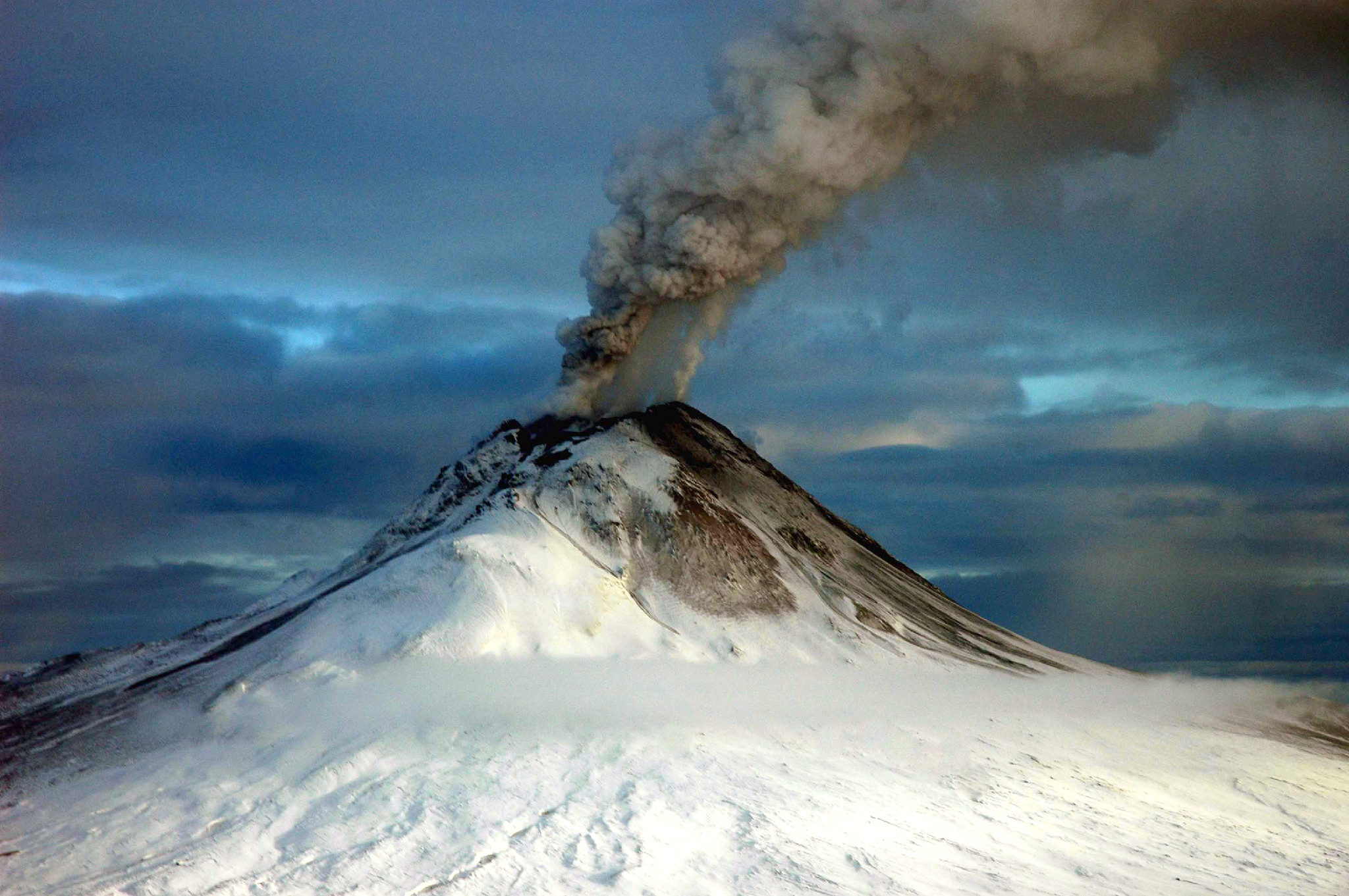
2006 eruption

The volcano erupted on January 11, 2006, entering a second stage, which would continue until January 28. Tectonic earthquakes began early in January, resulting in an explosive Volcanic Explosivity Index 3 eruption later in that day. Several ash columns were generated, each 9 km (6 mi) above sea level; these plumes were steadily influenced to the north and northeast of the volcano. Samples of the tephra were dense, insinuating that the lava released was mature.

Six explosions were recorded by seismic instruments between January 13, the first of these consuming a seismograph and a CPGS located on the northwestern flank. Ash columns now reached 14 km (9 mi) and Kenai Peninsula residents reported ash deposits. On January 16, a new lava dome was observed on the summit; and the next day another explosive eruption sent ash 13 km (8 mi) into the atmosphere. This explosion created a 20–30 meter wide crater in the new lava dome.

On September 22, 2007, the Alaska Volcano Observatory reported that shallow earthquake activity had increased over the week of September 22. However, the activity was less than its level during the months leading up to the 2005–2006 eruption.

== Sensor networks ==
The Plate Boundary Observatory has a network of 10 high-precision GPS instruments on the flanks of Augustine. Subsequent volcanic activity claimed two of those sites. The Alaska Volcano Observatory also operates a number of seismometers and tiltmeters all around the volcano, including four webcams.

== See also ==
- List of volcanoes in the United States
