= Mount Kermode =

Mountain in British Columbia, Canada

Coordinates: 52°57′25″N 131°51′29″W

Mount Kermode, originally Kermode Mountain, 1091 m (3579 feet), is a mountain located on the west side of Louise Island in the Haida Gwaii archipelago of British Columbia, Canada. It is the highest mountain on Louise Island, the other named summit being Mount Carl.

== Name origin ==
As per the official naming policy at BC Names, the name Kermode Mountain was changed to Mount Kermode, as the latter format indicates a summit named for a person. Here the name is not directly in reference to the Kermode bear, but to the then-curator of the Provincial Museum, Francis Kermode, who was appointed to that position in 1904, serving until 1940, and for whom the Kermode bear was named.
