= Tanaga (volcano) =

Mountain in Alaska, United States

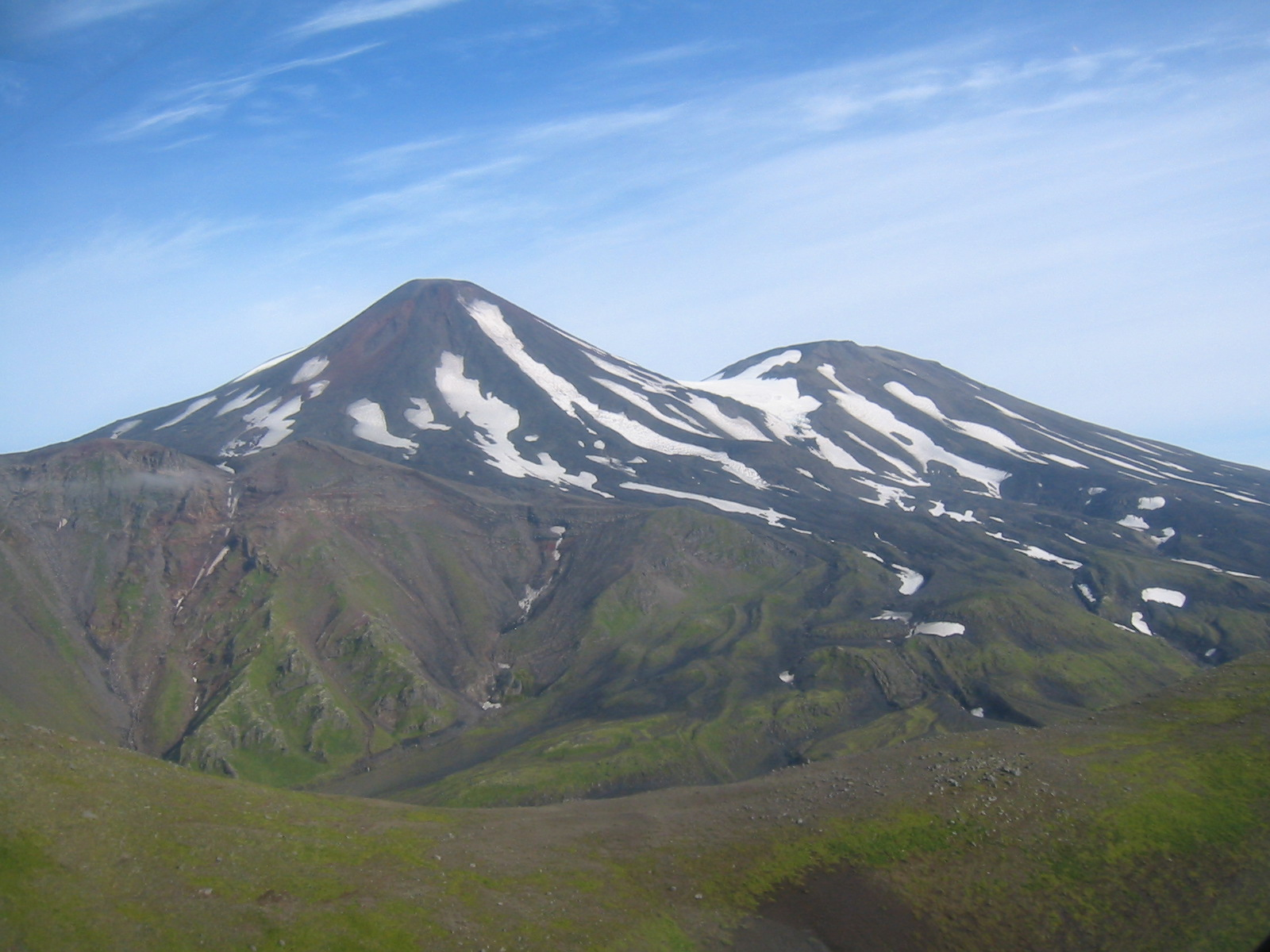
- Tanaga

Highest point
- Elevation: 5,925 ft (1,806 m)
- Prominence: 5,925 ft (1,806 m)
- Listing: North America isolated peak 18th; US most prominent peaks 68th
- Coordinates: 51°53′02″N 178°08′29″W

Geography
- Location within Alaska
- Location: Tanaga Island, Alaska, U.S.
- Parent range: Aleutian Range

Geology
- Formed by: Subduction zone volcanism
- Mountain type: Stratovolcano
- Volcanic arc: Aleutian Arc
- Last eruption: 1914

Tanaga (Aleut: Kusuuginax̂) is a 5,924-foot (1,806 m) stratovolcano in the Aleutian Range of the U.S. state of Alaska. There have been three known eruptions since 1763. The most recent was in 1914 and produced lava flows. It sits west of another stratovolcano known as Mount Takawangha, which last erupted in 1550.

== See also ==
- List of mountain peaks of North America
  - List of mountain peaks of the United States
    - List of mountain peaks of Alaska
- List of Ultras of the United States
- List of volcanoes in the United States
