= Calvert Island =

Island in Kenora District, Ontario, Canada

- Location of Calvert Island in Ontario.

Geography
- Coordinates: 49°17′27″N 94°04′55″W
- Length: 930 m (3050 ft)
- Width: 520 m (1710 ft)
- Highest elevation: 335 m (1099 ft)

Administration
- Canada
- Province: Ontario
- District: Kenora

Calvert Island is an island in Whitefish Bay, Lake of the Woods in Kenora District, Ontario, Canada. It is about 13 kilometres (8 mi) south of the community of Sioux Narrows and 4 kilometres (2.5 mi) west of Ontario Highway 71.

Calvert Island is 930 metres (3,051 ft) long and 520 metres (1,706 ft) wide. The western edge is lined with smooth rocks that are tilted at a 45-55 degree angle and go straight into the water. Calvert Island is mostly undeveloped, except for Whitefish Bay Camp, which is on the southern tip.

The island has two bays: one named Clipper Bay and one unnamed. Clipper Bay is the larger of the two, and is on the southeastern edge of the island, with a depth of between 3 metres (10 ft) and 4.5 metres (15 ft). The unnamed smaller bay is very shallow, and is usually a breeding ground for frogs and Northern Pike. Most of the cabins of Whitefish Bay Camp overlook this small, shallow bay.

Patsy Island, which is uninhabited, lies immediately to the east of Calvert Island, and there are numerous unnamed surrounding islands.
