= Kanaga Volcano =

Volcano in Alaska, United States

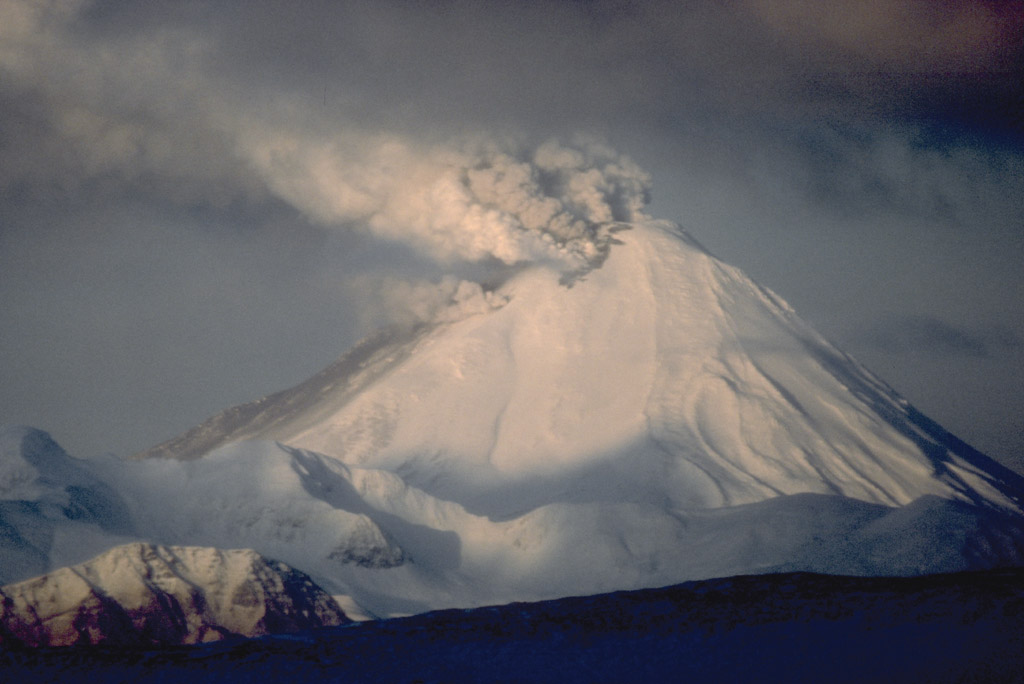
- View, looking west to Kanaga Volcano in 1994 eruption

Highest point
- Elevation: 4,288 ft (1,307 m)
- Prominence: 1,307 m (4,288 ft)
- Coordinates: 51°55′24″N 177°10′05″W

Geography
- Location: Kanaga Island, Alaska, U.S.
- Parent range: Aleutian Range
- Topo map: USGS Adak C-4

Geology
- Formed by: Subduction zone volcanism
- Mountain type: Stratovolcano
- Volcanic arc: Aleutian Arc
- Last eruption: December 18, 2023

Kanaga Volcano, or Mount Kanaga, is a stratovolcano at the northern tip of Kanaga Island in the Aleutian Islands, Alaska. It is situated within a caldera, which forms the arcuate Kanaton Ridge south and east of Kanaga. A crater lake occupies part of the SE caldera floor. The summit of Kanaga has a crater with fumarolic activity.

It is located about 25 km (16 mi) west of the U.S. Navy installation and port on Adak Island. The volcano erupted intermittently through much of 1994, dusting the community of Adak at least once with fine ash.

A steam-driven explosion took place at Kanaga on December 18, 2023, after months of elevated seismic activity on the island throughout the year. The current volcanic unrest at Kanaga continues to present day and is being monitored by the Alaska Volcano Observatory. Its previous eruption was in February 2012.

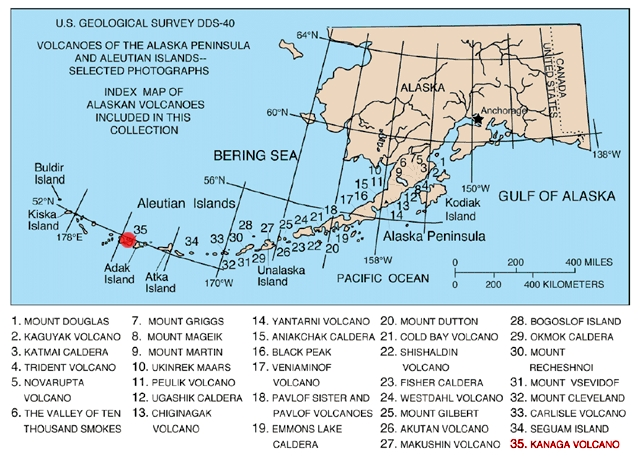
Map showing volcanoes of Alaska. The mark is set at the location of Kanaga Volcano.

== Gallery ==
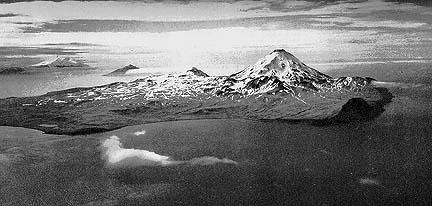
Aerial photograph of Kanaga Island produced in 1952 by the United States Navy

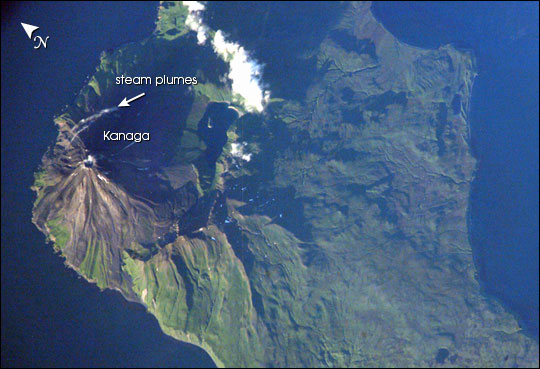
Kanaga Island with Kanaga Volcano seen from space

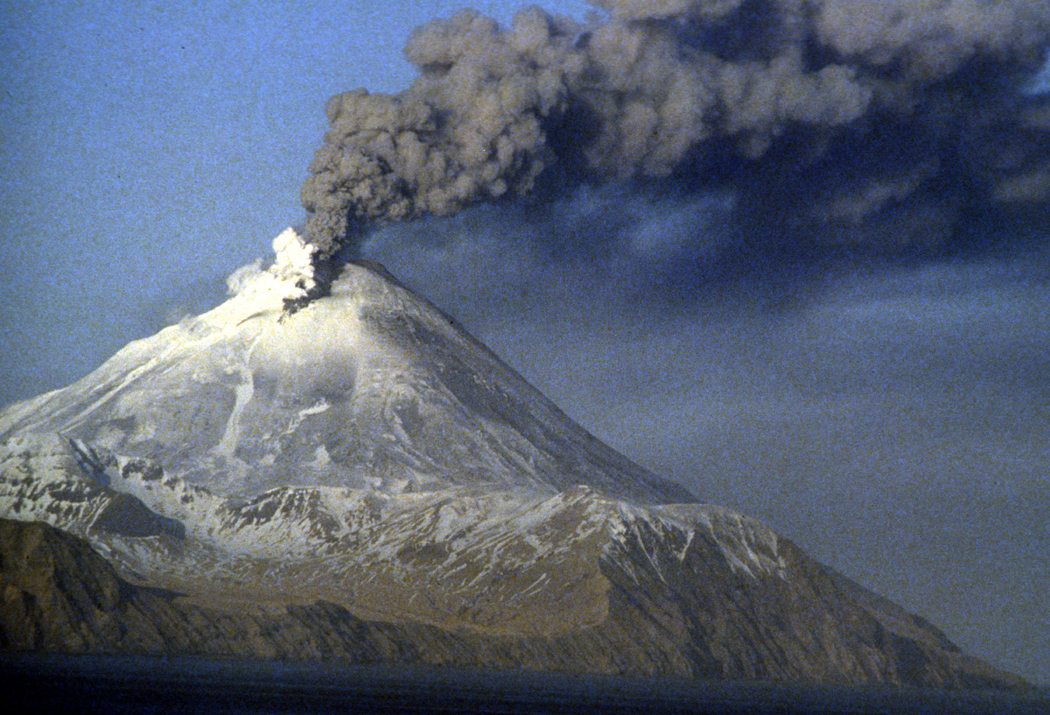
Kanaga Volcano, Kanaga Island, Aleutians

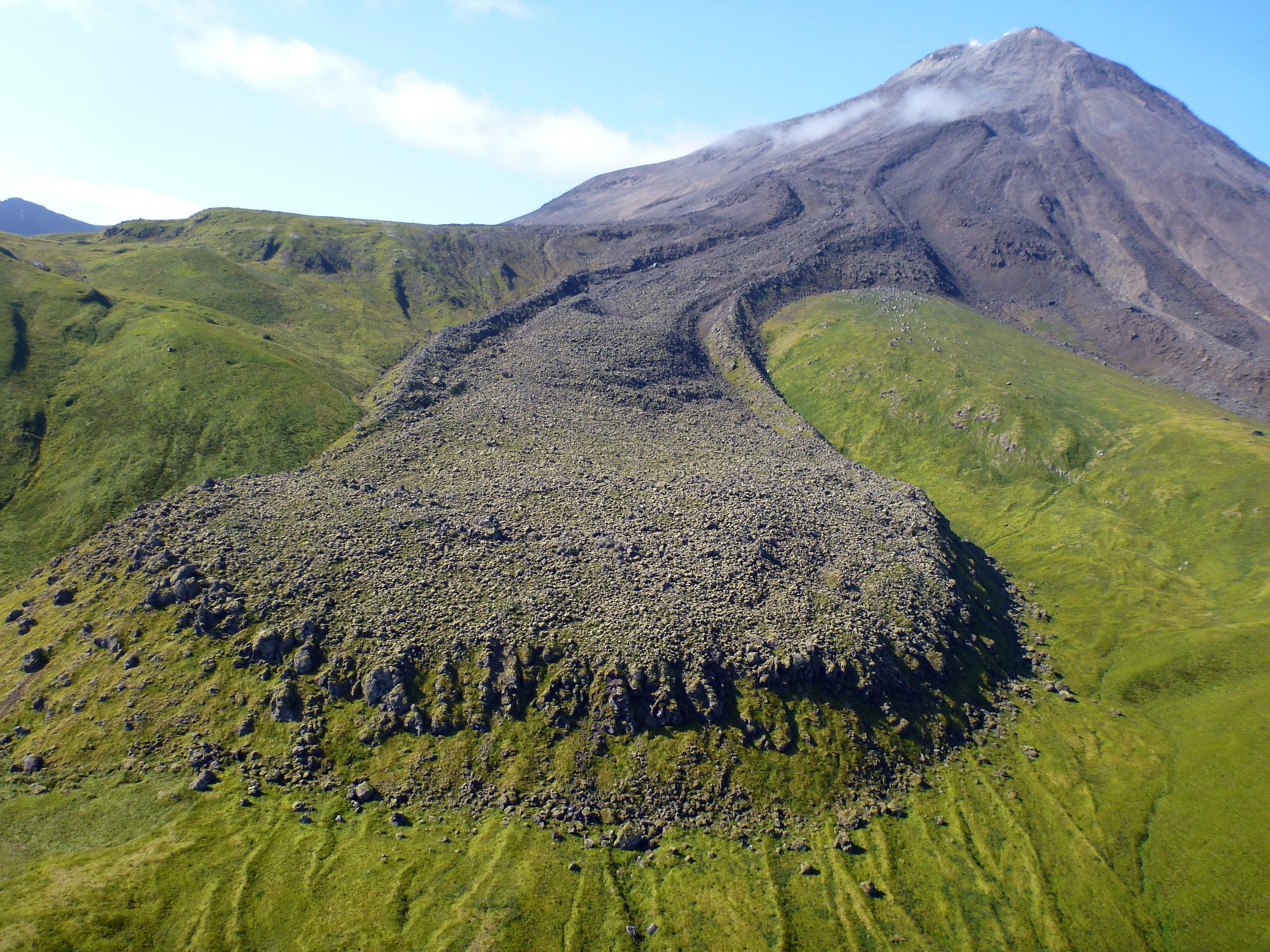
Lava flow formed by 1906 eruption of Kanaga Volcano

== See also ==
- List of volcanoes in the United States
- Alaska Volcano Observatory
