= Farquhar Peak (British Columbia) =

Mountain in British Columbia, Canada

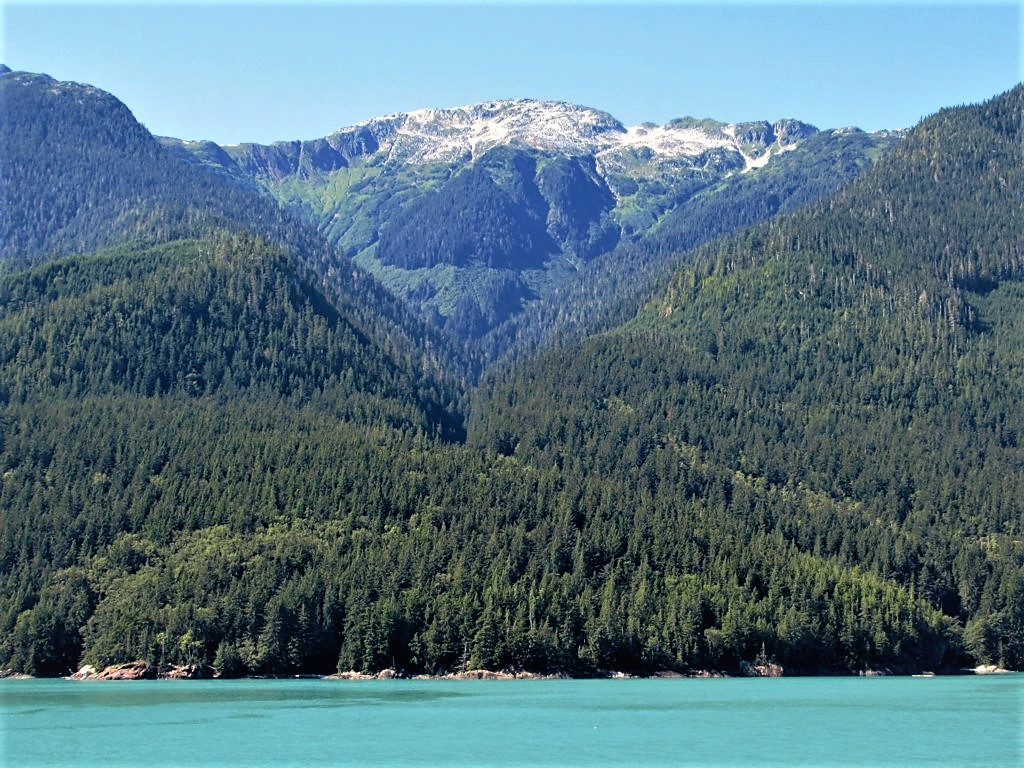
- South aspect

Highest point
- Elevation: 1,679 m (5,509 ft)
- Prominence: 1,679 m (5,509 ft)
- Parent peak: Bensins Peak (2229 m)
- Isolation: 14.5 km (9.0 mi)
- Listing: Mountains of British Columbia
- Coordinates: 52°19′18″N 127°18′24″W

Geography
- Location within British Columbia Location within Canada
- Interactive map of Farguhar Peak
- Country: Canada
- Province: British Columbia
- District: Range 3 Coast Land District
- Parent range: Coast Mountains
- Topo map: NTS 93D6 Labouchere Channel

Farquhar Peak is a mountain on King Island, British Columbia and is the island's highest point. The peak is unofficially named after the Farquhar River. (Note: The name has not been officially recognized by the Geographical Names Board of Canada.)

== Climate ==
Based on the Köppen climate classification, Farquhar Peak is located in the marine west coast climate zone of western North America. Most weather fronts originate in the Pacific Ocean, and travel east toward the Coast Mountains where they are forced upward by the range (Orographic lift), causing them to drop their moisture in the form of rain or snowfall. As a result, the Coast Mountains experience high precipitation, especially during the winter months in the form of snowfall.
