= Aero, British Columbia =

Aero
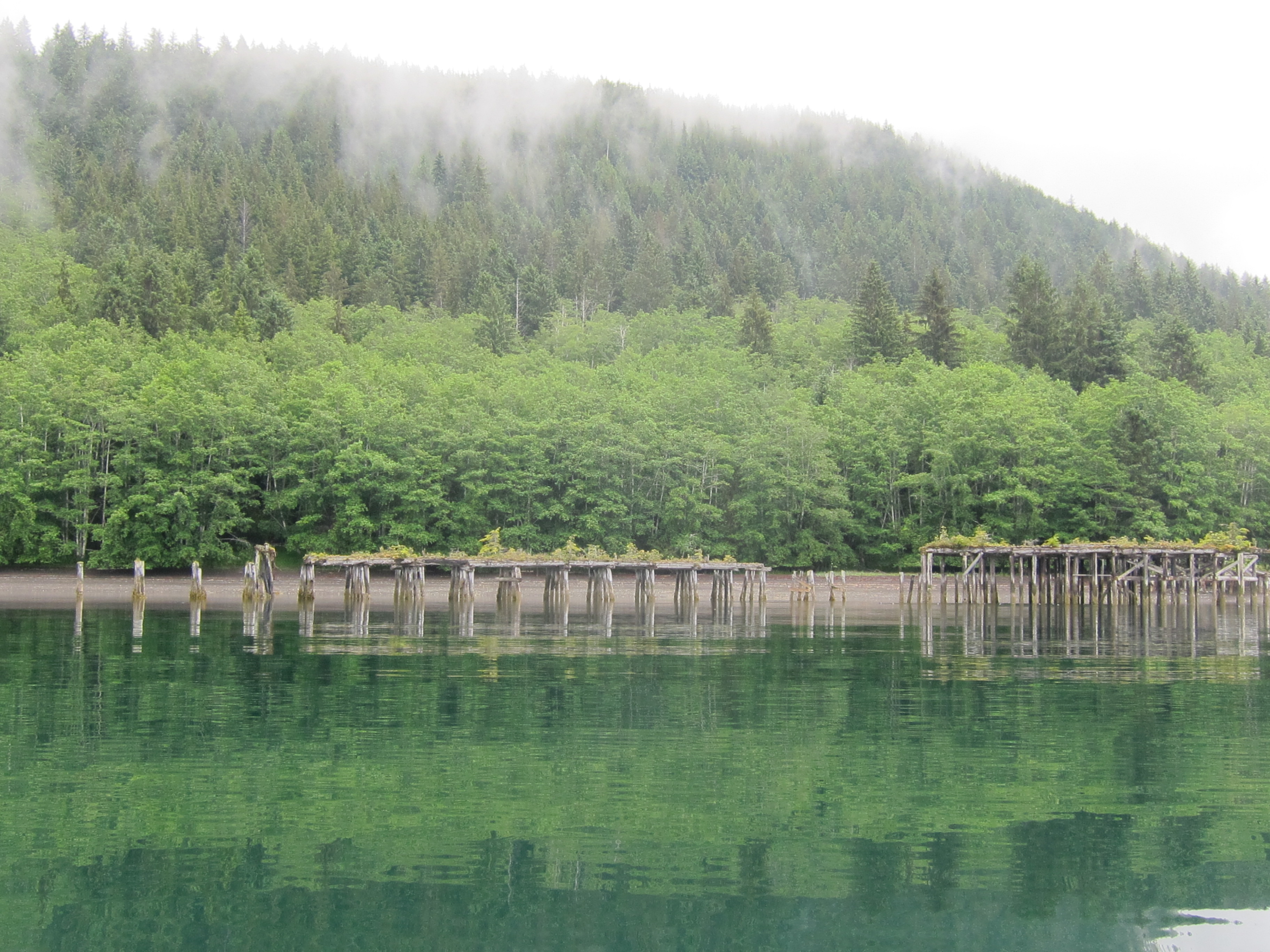
- Pilings from railway landing at Aero

- Location of Aero in British Columbia
- Coordinates: 53°03′05″N 131°57′35″W
- Country: Canada
- Province: British Columbia

Aero or Aero Camp was a logging camp and associated post office on Moresby Island in Haida Gwaii off the North Coast of British Columbia, Canada. It was founded in 1933 by the A. P. Allison Logging Company, and originally known as Allison Camp.

== Early history ==
In 1936, a logging railroad was constructed to give the beach-based camp access to inland timber. At the start of World War II, Aero Camp became a source of high quality Sitka spruce used to build aircraft, including the famous mosquito bomber. In 1942, at the height of the war, the camp was taken over by Aero Timber Products Ltd. At this point the camp's name was changed to Aero Camp.

== Aero Post Office ==
The Aero post office was designated on October 7, 1948, and opened on October 23 of that year, and closed on January 15, 1958. Aero was listed as a steamboat landing and appeared on the regular scheduled services of the Union Steamship Company of British Columbia in 1954, 1955 and 1957. From 1959 to 1964 the landing was served by Northland Navigation Company steamers. Logging had ceased by 1965 but a watchman remained on site and the wharf remained in use by fishing vessels.
