= Great Sitkin Island =

Volcanic island in the U.S. state of Alaska

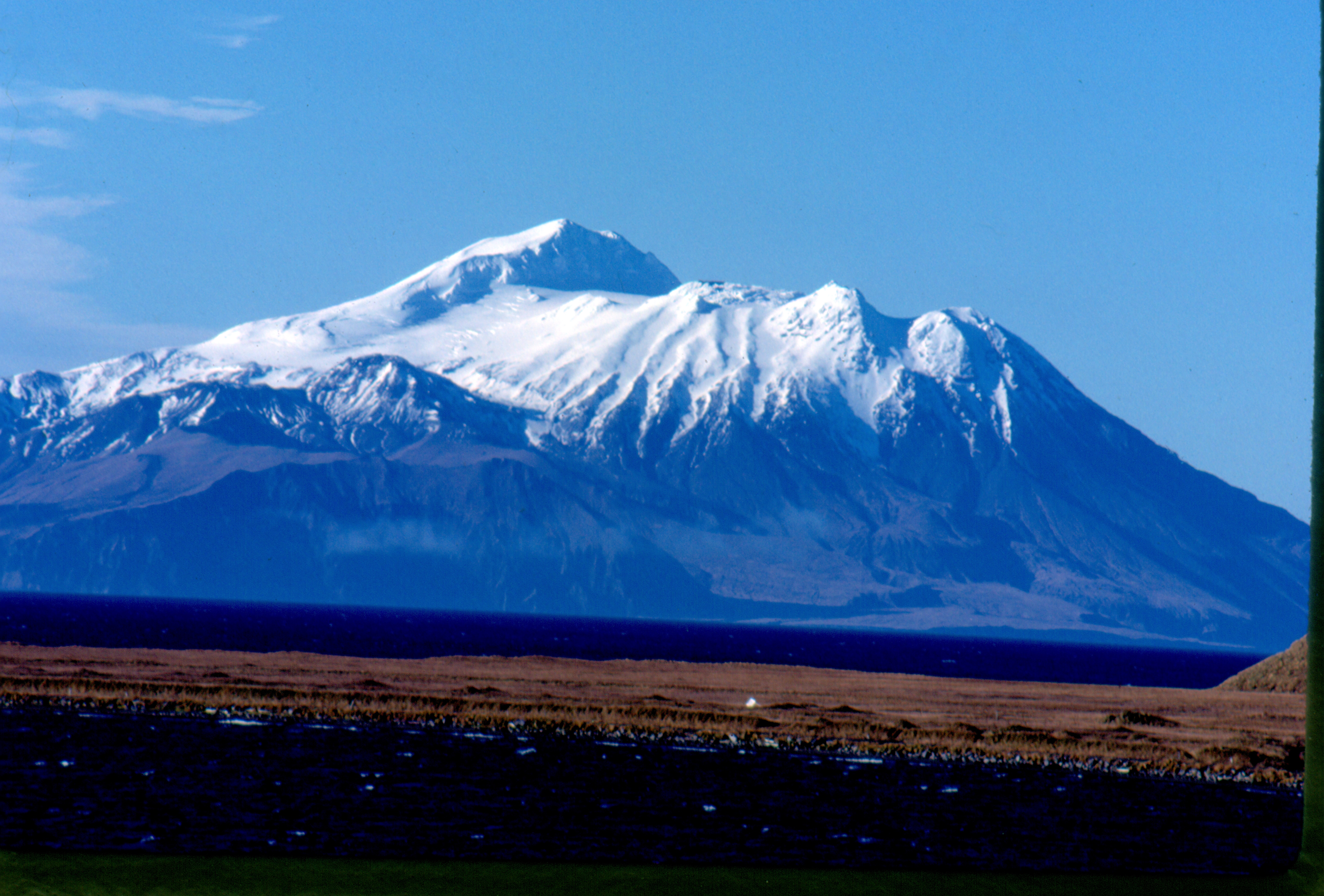
- View of Great Sitkin Volcano from the shore of Adak Island

- Location within Alaska

Geography
- Location: Aleutian islands
- Coordinates: 52.0765°N 176.1109°W
- Type: Volcanic
- Area: 60 sq mi (160 km^{2})
- Highest elevation: 5,710 ft (1740 m)
- Highest point: Great Sitkin Volcano

Demographics
- Population: Uninhabited

Additional information
- Time zone: UTC-10:00

Great Sitkin Island (Aleut: Sitх̑naх̑; Russian: Большой Ситкин) is an uninhabited volcanic island in the Andreanof Islands of the Aleutian Islands of Alaska. The island covers a total area of 60 square miles (160 km^{2}) and lies slightly north of a group of islands which are located between Adak Island and Atka Island.

The island is 18 kilometres (11 mi) long and 16.94 kilometres (10.53 mi) wide, with its northern section dominated by the Great Sitkin Volcano.

== History ==
Great Sitkin was the site of a fuel depot during World War II, Sand Bay Naval Station, construction finished on May 15, 1943, and included accommodations for up to 680 men and consisted of 26 fuel oil tanks, three 6,000 barrel tanks, 22 10,000 barrel tanks and one 15,000 barrel tank and were surrounded by berms in case of attack or spills. The Naval Station had only around 10 people supporting it by 1949, but was in operation until 1963 and the remains of the oil tanks are still on the island and are an environmental hazard. Starting in 2021, cleanup feasibility was investigated for the leftover contaminants from the base. On September 24, 1959, a Douglas DC-4 carrying 5 crew and 11 passengers crashed due to pilot error with no survivors. On October 26, 1965, Liberty Ship Ekaterini G. (formerly Josiah G. Holland) ran aground after losing her propeller in heavy seas. All crewmen were rescued, though 2 were injured and one, Sotiris Mendrinos, later died of his injuries. The ship was declared a constructive total loss and remains aground on the western side of the island. On December 11, 1973, a Douglas DC-6 crashed on the island, killing all 10 people on board.

== Geology ==
The Great Sitkin Volcano makes up the majority of the northern parts of the Island, it is a complex stratovolcano and resides on an eroded caldera structure that formed prior to it, rising to a height of 5,710 feet (1,740 m), it is the highest point of the island, it produces eruptions ranging from effusive lava flows to explosions.

The most recent eruption of Great Sitkin Volcano started on 26 May 2021 (UTC time), with an explosive eruption that lasted for about two minutes. The effusive lava flow didn't start until late July 2021. As of September 2026, the lava eruption was ongoing, as the eruption continued, lava have mostly filled the summit crater and advanced into the valleys below.

With the eruption that started on 26 May 2021, studies have documented the spatiotemporal migration of earthquake activities before and after the eruption. The study, with seismic imaging of the velocity structure, reveals two magma reservoirs at different depths and locations relative to the volcano edifice. The spatial and temporal migration of seismicity back and forth between the northwestern and southeastern island may be explained by the alternating eruptive activity of the two imaged reservoirs.

== See also ==
- List of mountain peaks of North America
  - List of mountain peaks of the United States
    - List of mountain peaks of Alaska
- List of Ultras of the United States
- List of volcanoes in the United States
