= Tanaga Island =

Island in Aleutians West Census Area, Alaska, United States

Coordinates: 51°47′34″N 177°55′43″W

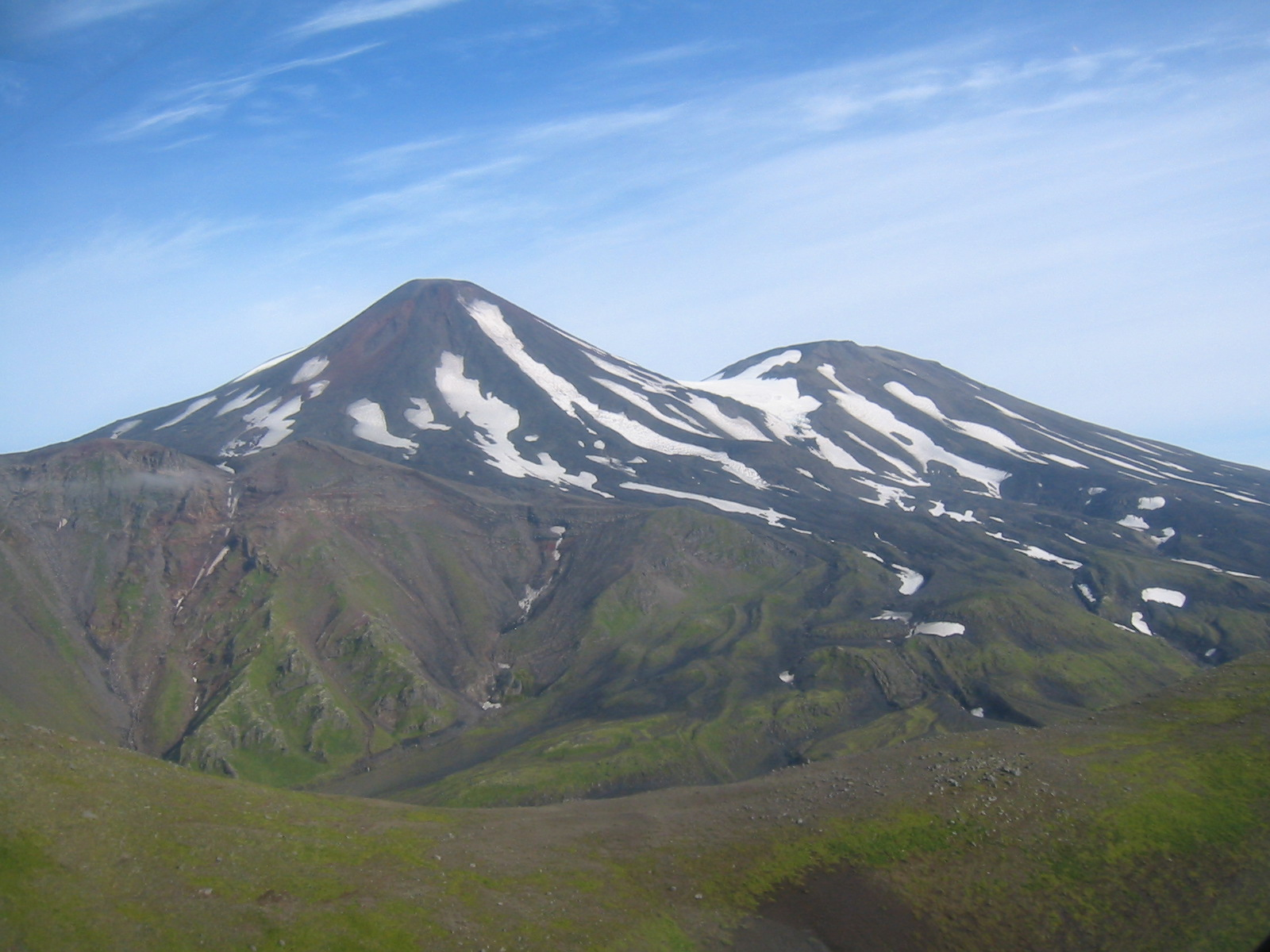
Tanaga and East Tanaga Volcanoes on Tanaga Island

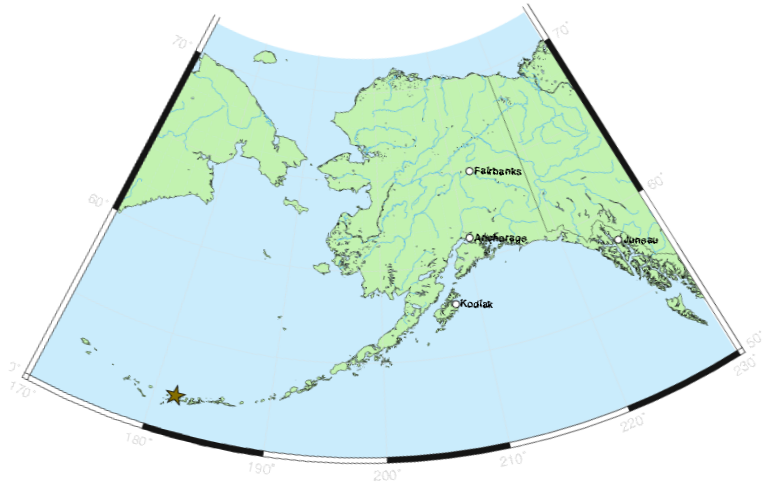
Location of Tanaga Island

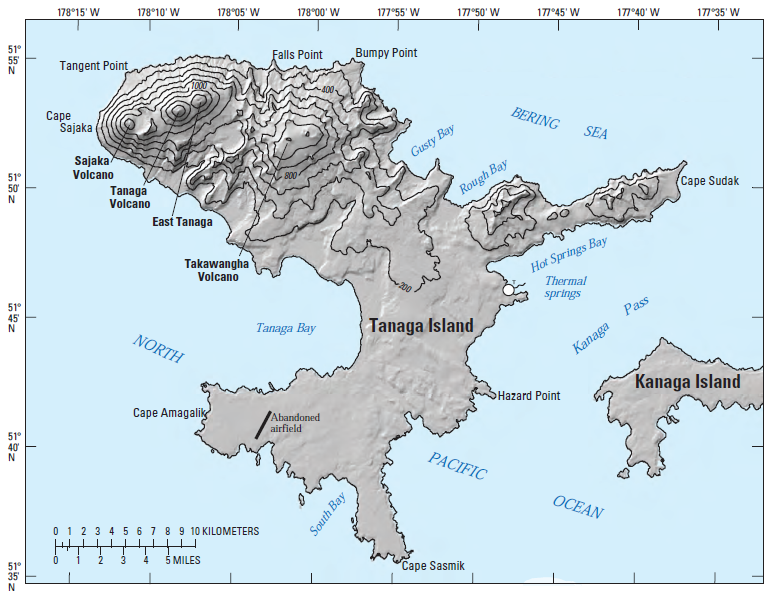
Tanaga Island

Tanaga Island (Aleut: Tanax̂ax; Russian: остров Танага) is an island in the western Andreanof Islands, in the southwest part of the Aleutian Islands, Alaska. The island has a land area of 204 square miles (528 square kilometers), making it the 33rd largest oceanic island in the United States. Its highest point is volcano Mount Tanaga (Aleut: Kusuuginax̂) at 5,925 feet (1,806 meters).

Tanaga Island measures 43 kilometers (27 miles) long and 38 kilometers (24 miles) wide.

Tanaga Island is about 62 miles (100 kilometers) west of Adak Island, the nearest inhabited island. There are several large waterfalls on Tanaga Island. Tanaga Island is uninhabited, but several cabins are shown on the NOAA nautical chart, as well as some Aleut villages on the east side of the island.

There are no native land mammals on Tanaga Island.

Tanaga Island was established as a Navy emergency landing field in July 1943 as an adjunct to the Adak Naval Operation Base. Seabees of Naval Construction Battalion 45 built a runway, small-craft pier, mooring area, office and storage buildings, radio building, galley and mess facilities, dispensary, and 4 miles (6 kilometers) of gravel road in 1943, near Lash Bay in the southwest of the island. The site was abandoned in 1945. The control tower is still shown on nautical charts.

== Volcano ==
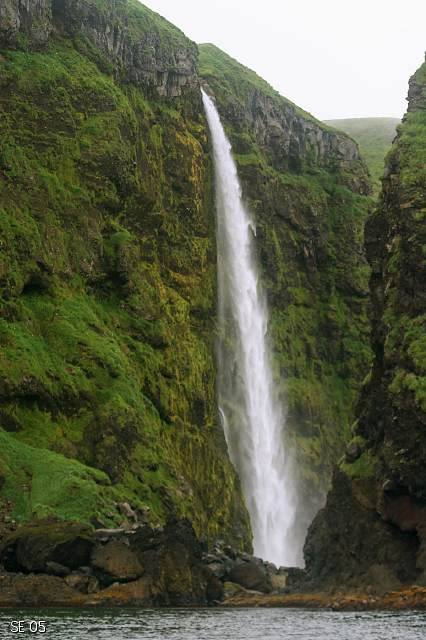
Waterfall on Tanaga Island

The last known eruption of Tanaga volcano occurred in 1914. Earlier eruptions were reported in 1763-1770, 1791, and 1829. Reports of these eruptions are vague, but deposits on the flanks of the volcano show that typical eruptions produce blocky lava flows and occasional ash clouds.

Eruptions have occurred both from the summit vent and a 5,197-foot-high (1,584-meter) satellite vent on the volcano's northeast flank. Immediately west of Tanaga volcano lies Sajaka, a 4,443-foot-high (1,354-meter) compound edifice.

Takawangha's 4,754-foot-high (1,449-meter) summit is mostly ice-covered, except for four young craters that have erupted ash and lava flows in the last few thousand years. Parts of Takawangha's edifice are hydrothermally altered and may be unstable, and could produce localized debris avalanches. No historical eruptions are known from Sajaka or Takawangha; however, field work shows that recent eruptions have occurred and it is possible that historic eruptions attributed only to Tanaga may instead have come from these other vents.

=== 2017 ===
A swarm of earthquakes was reported in January 2017 about 6 kilometers from Takawangha, causing the Alaska Volcano Observatory to raise the alert level to YELLOW/ADVISORY
