= Louise Island =

Island in British Columbia, Canada

Native name: Ḵ'uuna Gwaay
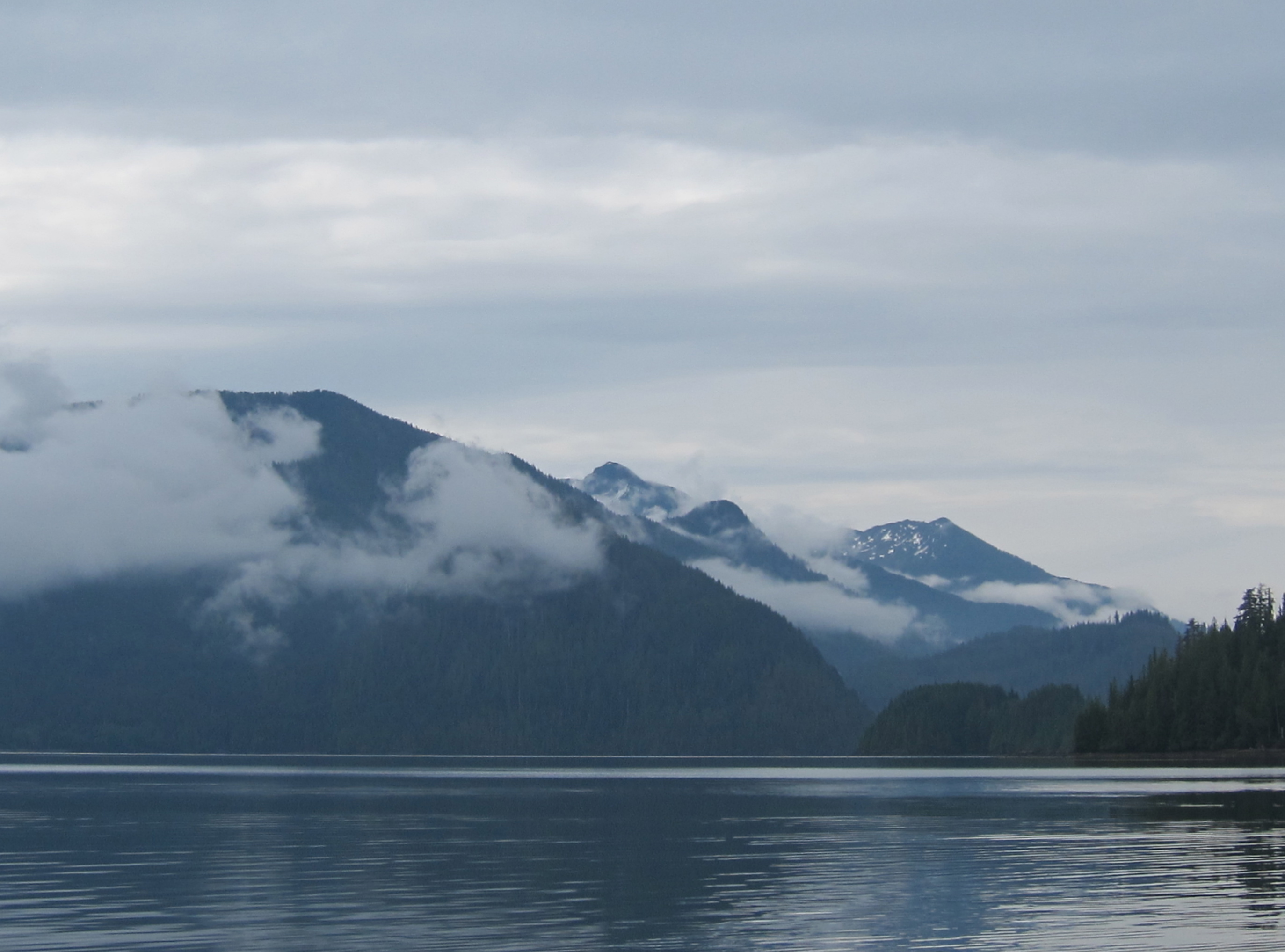
- Interactive map of Louise Island

Geography
- Location: Pacific Ocean
- Coordinates: 52°57′18″N 131°46′26″W
- Archipelago: Haida Gwaii
- Area: 275 km^{2} (106 sq mi)

Administration
- Canada

Demographics
- Ethnic groups: Haida

Louise Island is a 275-square-kilometre (106 sq mi) island in Haida Gwaii, in British Columbia, Canada, off the east coast of Moresby Island and just north of Laskeek Bay. It was named for Princess Louise, Duchess of Argyll, fourth daughter of Queen Victoria. Louise Island is located east of Moresby Island and Carmichael Passage, and south of Cumshewa Inlet.

The island is home to the ancient Haida village of Skedans. Beatty Anchorage, a logging camp, is also on the island.

Two officially named mountains on the island are Mount Kermode and Mount Carl.

== See also ==
- List of islands of British Columbia
