= Dog Salmon River =

- Location of the mouth of the Dog Salmon River in Alaska

Location
- Country: United States
- State: Alaska
- Borough: Lake and Peninsula

Physical characteristics
- Source: Mount Kialagvik
  - location: Alaska Peninsula
  - coordinates: 57°09′31″N 156°44′50″W
  - elevation: 981 ft (299 m)
- Mouth: Ugashik River
  - location: 4 miles (6.4 km) southwest of Ugashik
  - coordinates: 57°28′51″N 157°29′02″W
  - elevation: 0 ft (0 m)
- Length: 70 mi (110 km)

The Dog Salmon River is a 70-mile (110 km) tributary of the Ugashik River in the U.S. state of Alaska. Beginning on the flanks of Mount Kialagvik, it flows northwest through the Alaska Peninsula National Wildlife Refuge to meet the larger river 4 miles (6 km) southwest of Ugashik, at the head of Ugashik Bay, an arm of Bristol Bay.

It descends to the upper reaches of the bay from an elevation of 981 feet (299 m) in a valley of the Aleutian Range between Mount Chiginagak and Mount Kialagvik. Among its feeder streams are Figure Eight, Goblet, and Wandering creeks.

It is shallow with many oxbow turns and is not navigable. The streambed is a mix of gravel and mud, with its milky glacier headwaters growing increasingly muddy as it progresses.

There are many rivers in Alaska bearing the name Dog Salmon River and this river should not be confused with those located on the Yukon-Kuskokwim Delta or eastern Norton Sound.

As its name suggests, the river primarily hosts large numbers of Chum Salmon along with smaller numbers of Pink Salmon and Dolly Varden char.

== See also ==
- List of rivers of Alaska
