= Icy Peak (Alaska) =

Summit in Alaska, United States

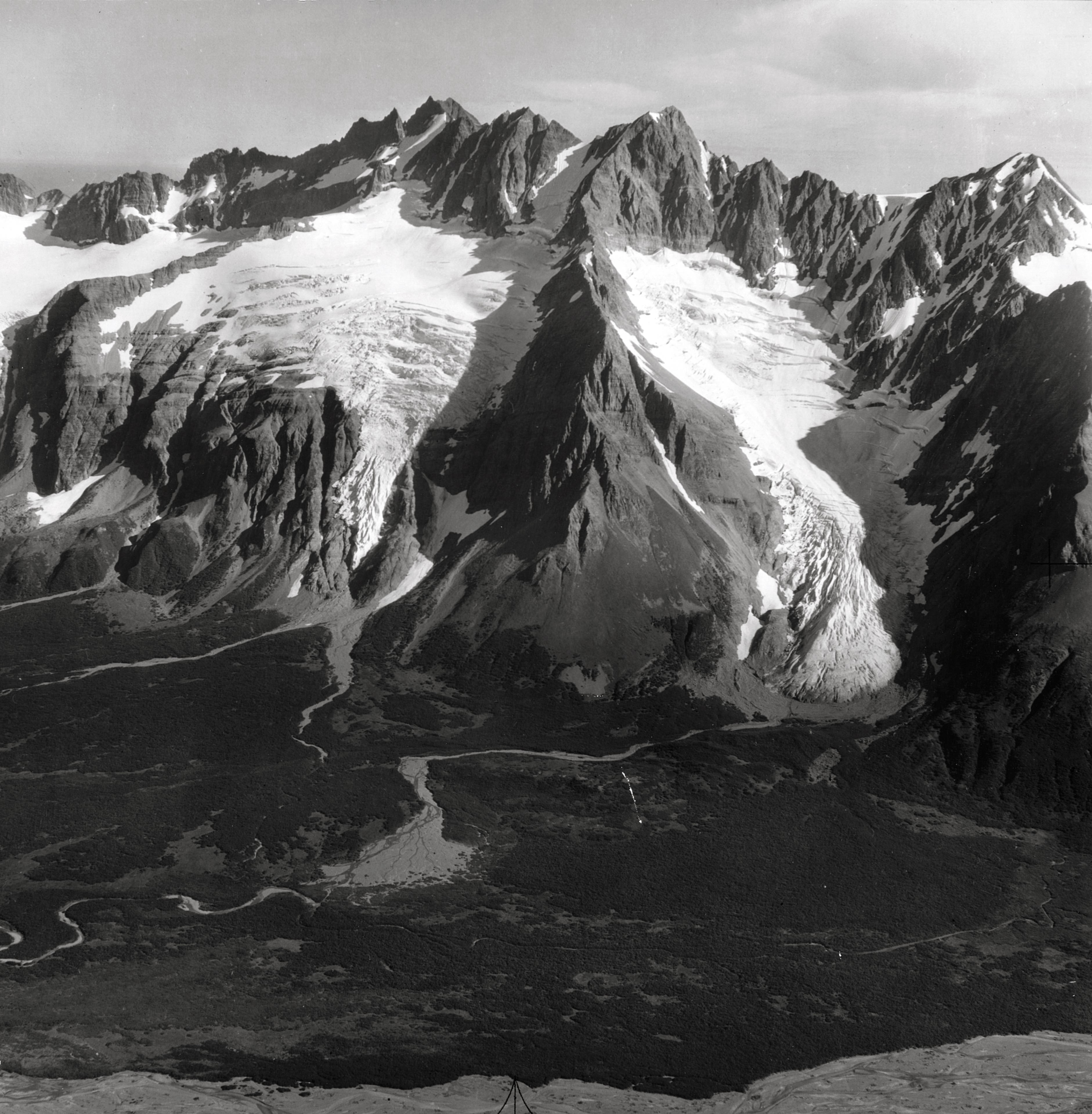
- Northwest aspect, in 1960

Highest point
- Elevation: 4,550 ft (1,390 m)
- Prominence: 1,300 ft (396 m)
- Parent peak: Mount Kialagvik
- Isolation: 8.52 mi (13.71 km)
- Coordinates: 57°15′01″N 156°32′09″W

Geography
- Location within Alaska
- Interactive map of Icy Peak
- Country: United States
- State: Alaska
- Borough: Kodiak Island Borough
- Protected area: Alaska Peninsula National Wildlife Refuge
- Parent range: Aleutian Range
- Topo map: USGS Ugashik B-2

Icy Peak is a 4,550-foot-elevation (1,390-meter) mountain summit in Alaska, United States.

== Description ==
Part of the Aleutian Range, Icy Peak is set 9.5 miles (15.3 km) southwest of Cape Kayakliut on the south coast of the Alaska Peninsula and within the Alaska Peninsula National Wildlife Refuge. Precipitation runoff and glacial meltwater from the mountain drains north into Kialagvik Creek, and south into Glacier Creek and Agripina River. Topographic relief is significant as the summit rises over 4,500 feet (1,372 meters) above tidewater of Wide Bay in approximately two miles (3.2 km). The mountain's local descriptive name was published by the United States Coast and Geodetic Survey in the early 1880s and the toponym has been officially adopted by the United States Board on Geographic Names.

== Climate ==
According to the Köppen climate classification system, Icy Peak is located in a subpolar oceanic climate zone with cold, snowy winters, and cool summers. Weather systems coming off the North Pacific are forced upwards by the mountains (orographic lift), causing heavy precipitation in the form of rainfall and snowfall. Winter temperatures can drop to 0 °F with wind chill factors below −10 °F. This climate supports 2.5 square miles (6.5 km^{2}) of unnamed glaciers and ice on the slopes surrounding the peak.

== Gallery ==
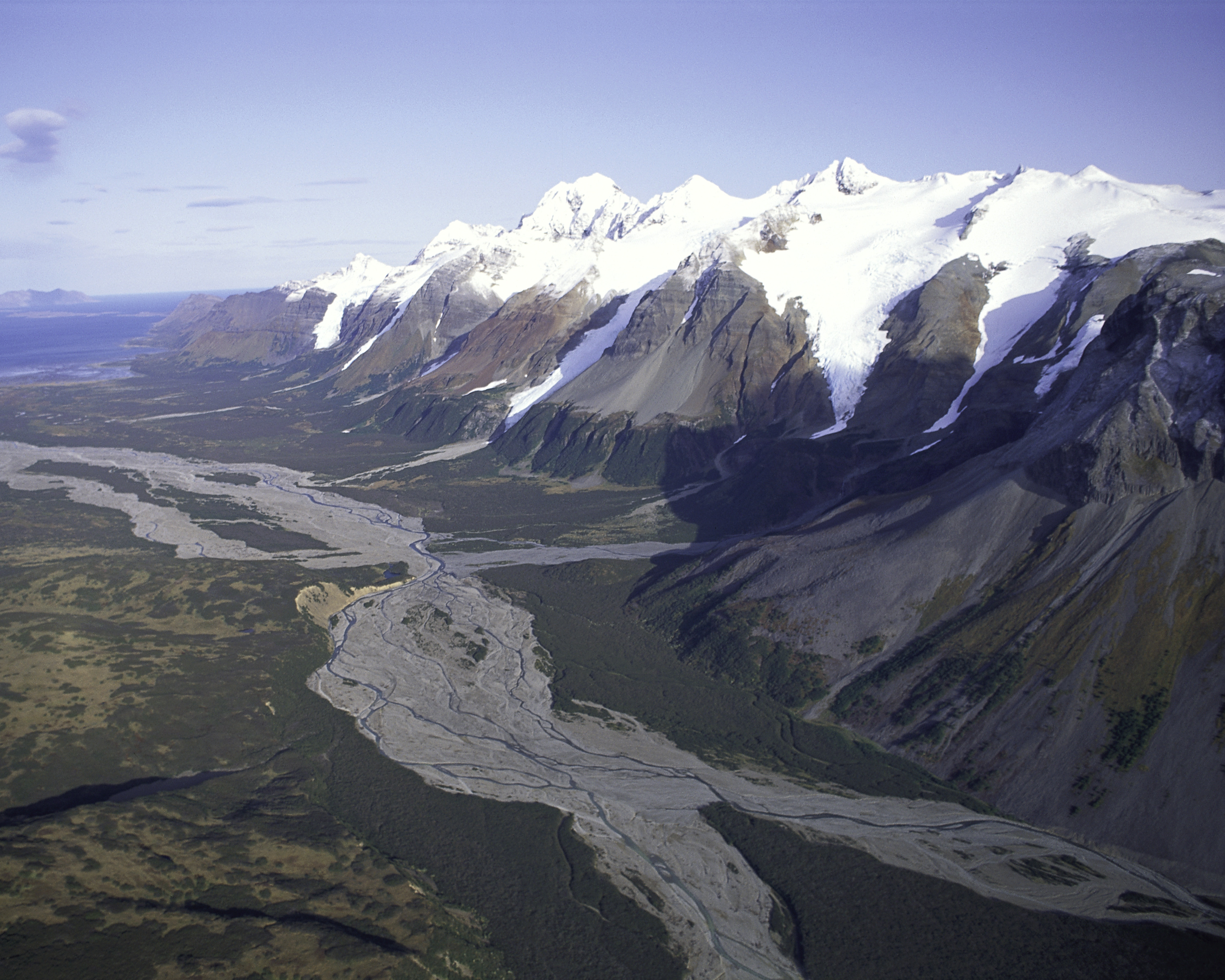
West aspect of Icy Peak above Kialagvik Creek

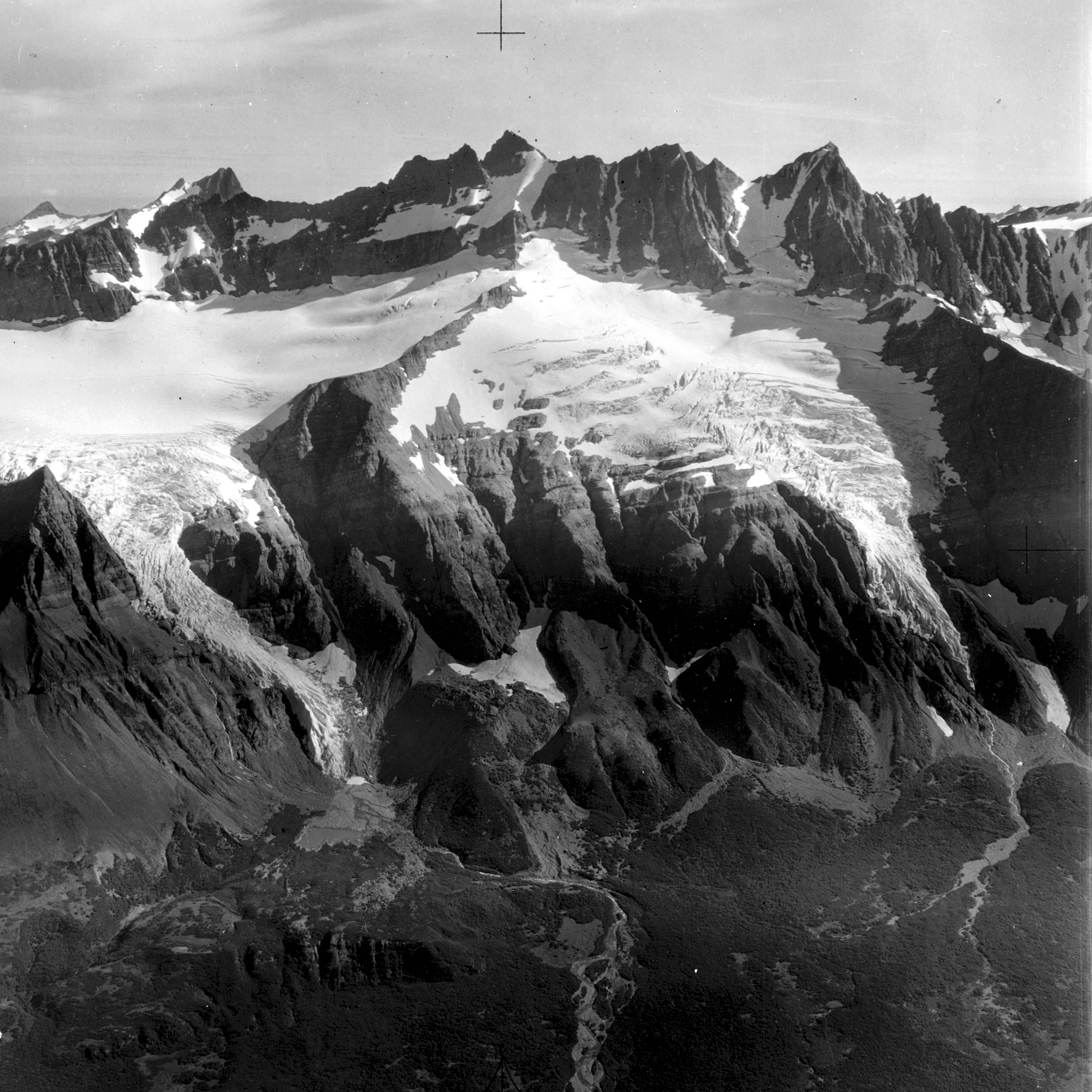
North aspect in 1960

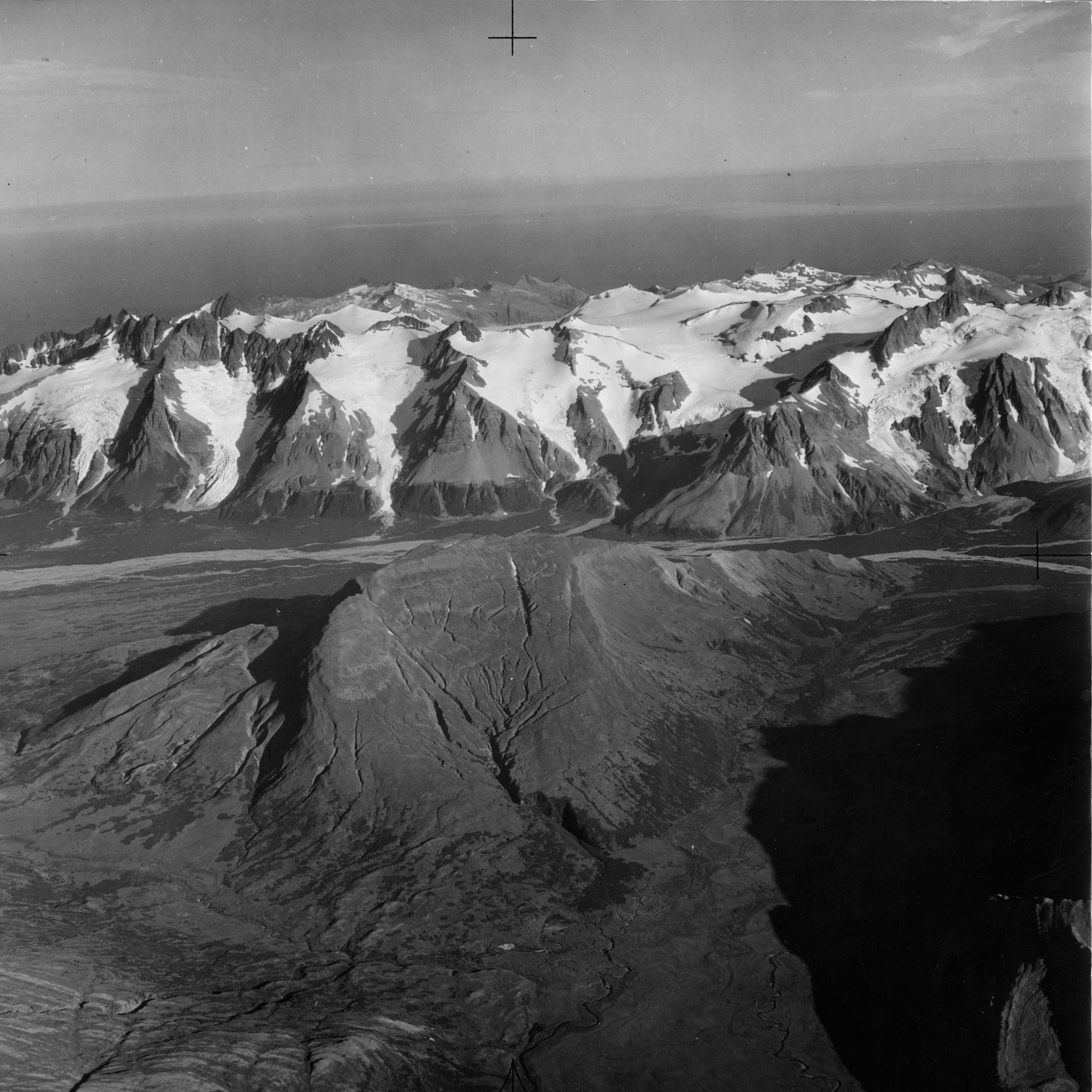
Wider angle view with Icy Peak to the left

== See also ==
- List of mountain peaks of Alaska
- Geography of Alaska
