= Ugashik =

Ugashik may refer to:

- Ugashik, Alaska
- Ugashik Bay
