= Mount Stepo =

Mountain in Alaska, United States

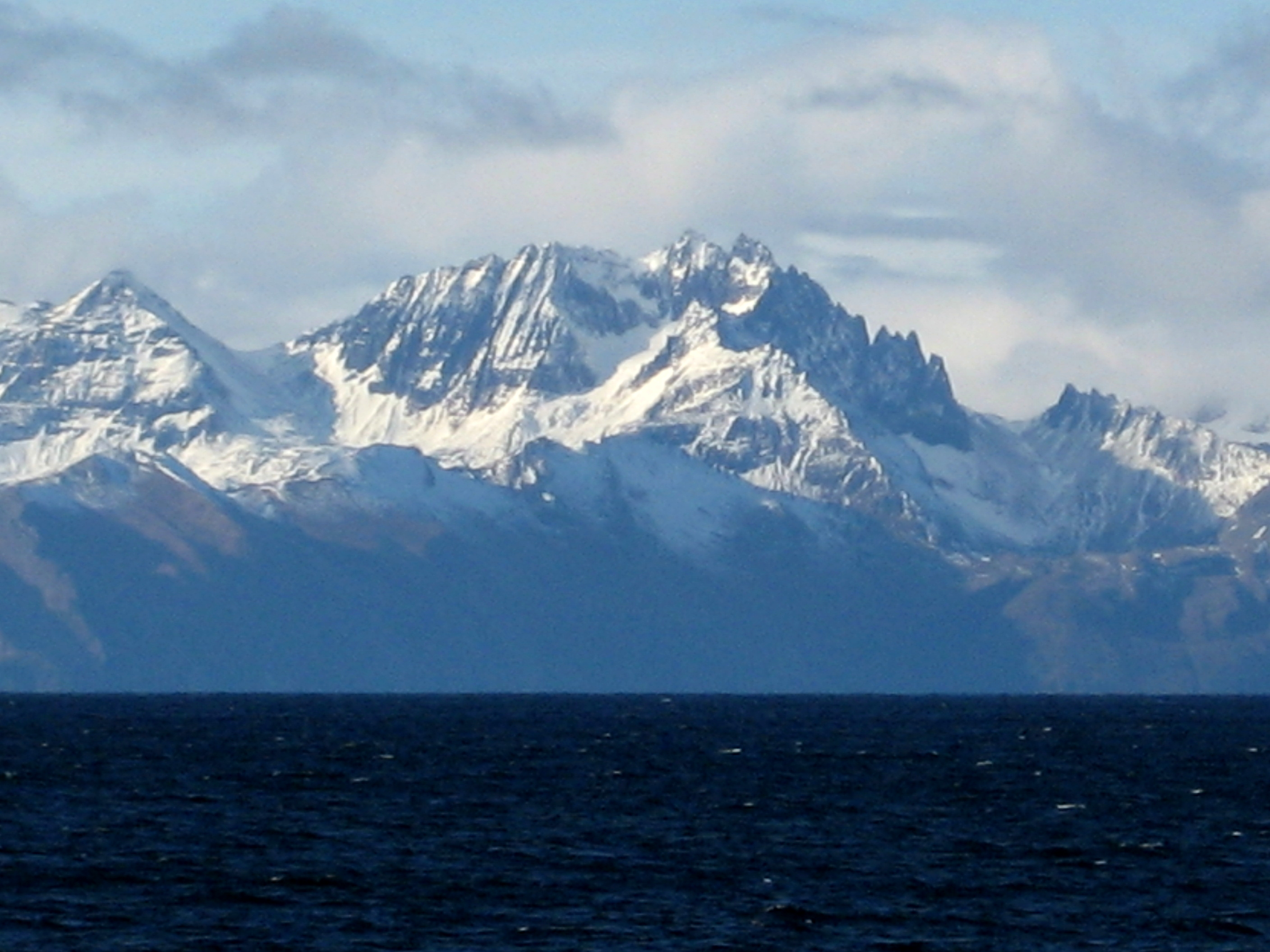
- Southeast aspect, from Stepovak Bay

Highest point
- Elevation: 3,828 ft (1,167 m)
- Prominence: 1,678 ft (511 m)
- Isolation: 5.35 mi (8.61 km)
- Coordinates: 55°42′59″N 160°10′48″W

Geography
- Location within Alaska
- Interactive map of Mount Stepo
- Country: United States
- State: Alaska
- Borough: Aleutians East Borough
- Protected area: Alaska Peninsula National Wildlife Refuge
- Parent range: Aleutian Range
- Topo map: USGS Port Moller C-1

Mount Stepo is a 3,828-foot-elevation (1,167-meter) mountain summit in Alaska.

== Description ==
Part of the Aleutian Range, Mount Stepo is located 30 miles (48 km) north-northeast of Sand Point near the southwest end of the Alaska Peninsula. It is set on the west shore of Stepovak Bay and within the Alaska Peninsula National Wildlife Refuge. The south peak is the higher peak of the twin summits composed of a row of spire-like shafts of rock on a spectacular saw-toothed ridge. Precipitation runoff and glacial meltwater from the mountain drains into American Bay and Stepovak Bay. Topographic relief is significant as the summit rises over 3,800 feet (1,158 meters) above tidewater at American Bay in 1.5 miles (2.4 km). The mountain's name was shown on a 1953 U.S. Geological Survey map and the toponym has been officially adopted by the United States Board on Geographic Names. The mountain is named in association with Stepovak Bay which was named Stepovakho Bay or Stepof's Bay by the United States Coast and Geodetic Survey in 1888, possibly for a Russian-American Company captain who cruised in the nearby Shumagin Islands prior to 1835.

== Climate ==
According to the Köppen climate classification system, Mount Stepo is located in a subpolar oceanic climate zone with cold, snowy winters, and cool summers. Weather systems coming off the North Pacific are forced upwards by the mountains (orographic lift), causing heavy precipitation in the form of rainfall and snowfall. Winter temperatures can drop to 0 °F with wind chill factors below −10 °F. This climate supports a small unnamed glacier on the west slope of the peak.

== See also ==
- List of mountain peaks of Alaska
- Geography of Alaska
