= King Salmon River (Ugashik River tributary) =

- Location of the mouth of the King Salmon River in Alaska

Location
- Country: United States
- State: Alaska
- Borough: Lake and Peninsula

Physical characteristics
- Source: Mother Goose Lake
  - location: Alaska Peninsula National Wildlife Refuge
  - coordinates: 57°13′02″N 157°22′59″W
  - elevation: 76 ft (23 m)
- Mouth: Ugashik River
  - location: 7 miles (11 km) south of Bristol Bay and 8 miles (13 km) southwest of Ugashik, Alaska Peninsula
  - coordinates: 57°29′50″N 157°38′30″W
  - elevation: 0 ft (0 m)
- Length: 35 mi (56 km)

The King Salmon River is a 35-mile (56 km) tributary of the Ugashik River in the U.S. state of Alaska. Beginning at Mother Goose Lake in the Aleutian Range, it flows northwest to meet the larger river near the upper reaches of Ugashik Bay. The lake and the upper course of the King Salmon lie within the Alaska Peninsula National Wildlife Refuge. The river's gravel bottom and braided channels are ideal for the many king salmon that spawn in its waters, but they limit navigation to small skiff.

There are many rivers in Alaska bearing the name King Salmon River, including tributaries to the Egegik River and Nushagak River systems in southwest Alaska, alone. The name is also occasionally confused with a nickname given the Kenai River, a popular fishing stream located in the Cook Inlet drainage of southcentral Alaska.

Besides the large numbers of king salmon, the river also hosts large numbers of sea-run Dolly Varden, Chum Salmon and a small run of Pink Salmon.

== See also ==
- List of rivers of Alaska
