= King Salmon Creek =

Watercourse in British Columbia, Canada

Coordinates: 58°47′39″N 133°17′47″W

King Salmon Creek is a creek in the Atlin District of British Columbia, Canada. The creek begins at King Salmon Lake and flows generally eastward to join the Taku River. Southeast of that confluence is King Salmon Mountain.

== See also ==
- King Salmon River (disambiguation) (four rivers in Alaska)
- King Salmon (disambiguation)
