= Ugashik River =

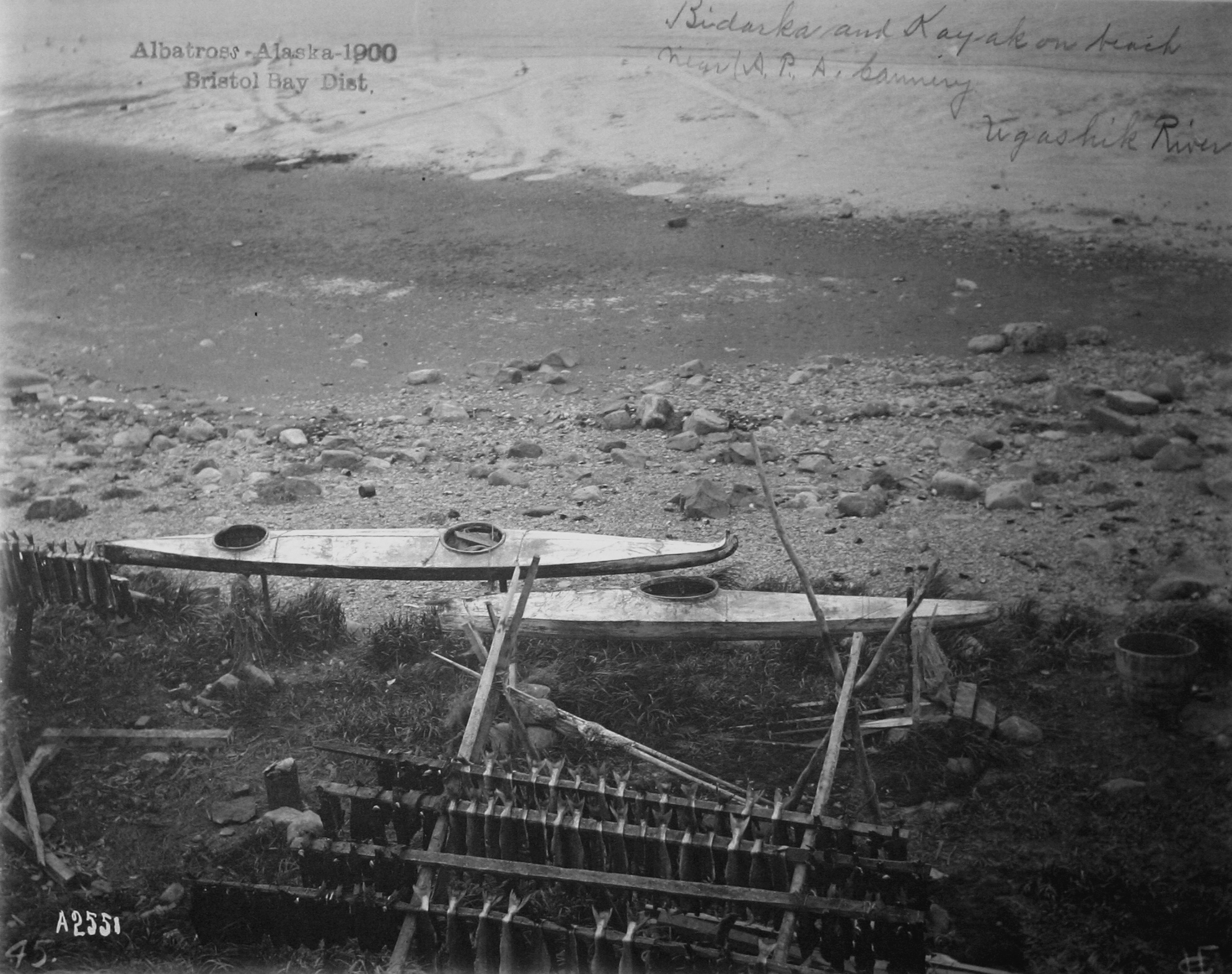
- Baidarka kayak near APA cannery, Ugashik River, 1900

- Location of the mouth of Ugashik River in Alaska

Location
- Country: United States
- State: Alaska
- Borough: Lake and Peninsula

Physical characteristics
- Source: Ugashik Lakes
  - coordinates: 57°33′49″N 156°59′49″W
  - elevation: 21 ft (6.4 m)
- Mouth: Ugashik Bay
  - location: 9 miles (14 km) southwest of Ugashik, Alaska Peninsula
  - coordinates: 57°29′44″N 157°36′07″W
  - elevation: 0 ft (0 m)
- Length: 43 mi (69 km)

The Ugashik River is a stream, 43 miles (69 km) long, on the Alaska Peninsula of the U.S. state of Alaska. It flows from headwaters near Lower Ugashik Lake and empties into Ugashik Bay, an estuary of the Bering Sea's Bristol Bay.

The origin of the name Ugashik is somewhat obscure, although early spelling variants such as Oogashik and Ougashick suggest the name pertains to the source of the river: two waters (lakes) and its muddy character.

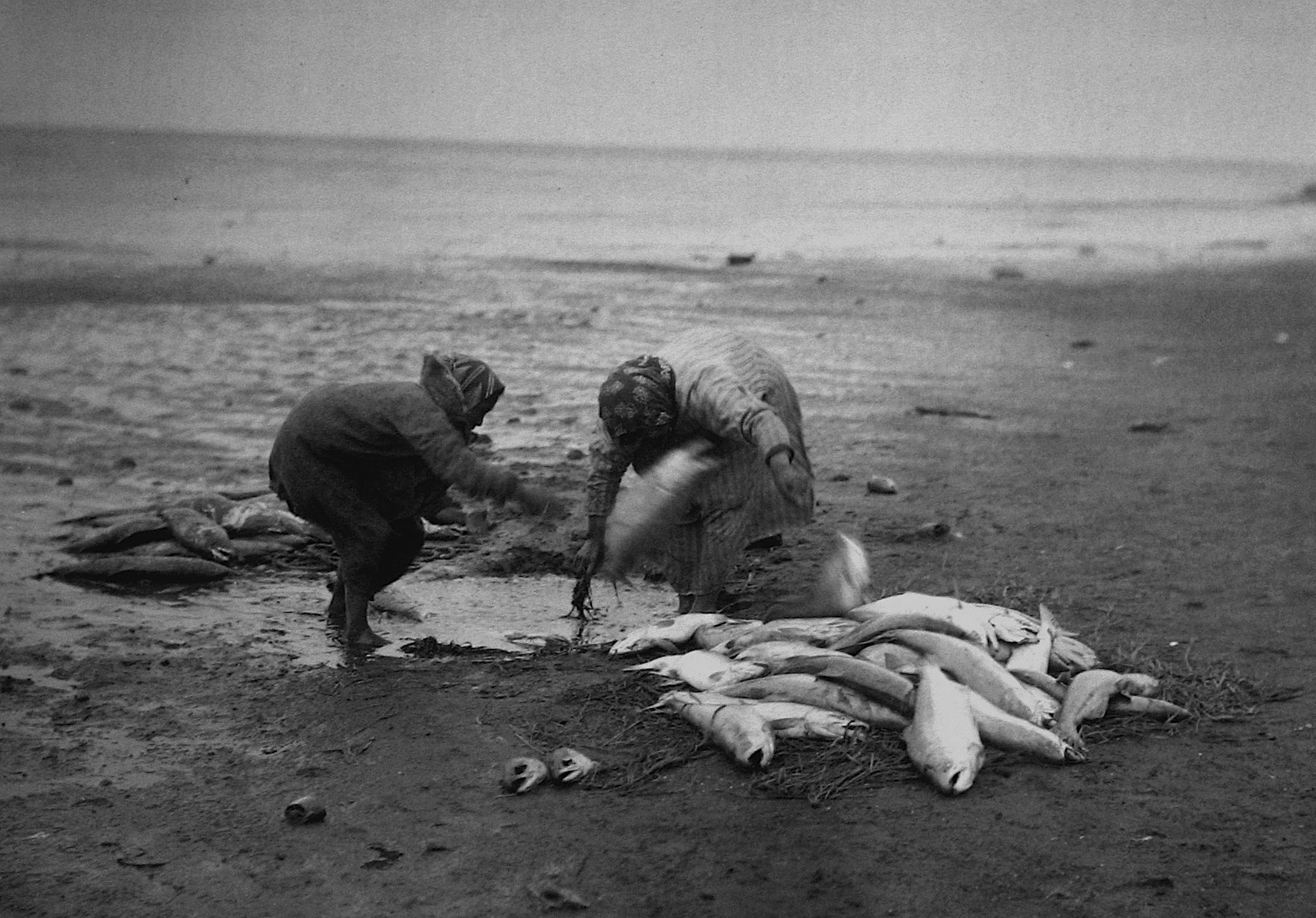
Eskimo women cleaning salmon on beach near the APA cannery at Ugashik River, 1900

The river has two major tributaries and one minor: the King Salmon River and the Dog Salmon River both have confluences near the river mouth at Ugashik Bay, while the smaller Dago Creek joins just four miles (6 km) from Smoky Point, where Ugashik Bay and Bristol Bay meet.

The river is navigable to a small lagoon located just outside the outlet from Lower Ugashik Lake. A small rapids between the lake and the lagoon serves as the location of a seasonally staffed salmon-counting weir operated by the Alaska Department of Fish and Game.

The river hosts several seasonal salmon runs including, during the peak summer season, part of the largest sockeye salmon migration in the world.

== See also ==
- List of rivers of Alaska
