= King Salmon =

King Salmon may refer to:

- Chinook salmon, fish
- King Salmon (video game), a 1992 video game for the Sega Genesis/Mega Drive

== Places ==
- King Salmon, Alaska
  - King Salmon Airport, a state owned, public use airport southeast of King Salmon, Alaska
- King Salmon, California
- King Salmon Creek, in British Columbia, Canada, a tributary of the Taku River
- King Salmon Mountain, British Columbia, Canada
- King Salmon Lake, British Columbia, Canada

== See also ==
- King Salmon River (disambiguation)
- King-of-the-salmon, another species of fish
