= Pilot Point =

Pilot Point may refer to:

- Pilot Point, Alaska
- Pilot Point, Texas
