= Mount Veniaminof =

Stratovolcano in Alaska, United States

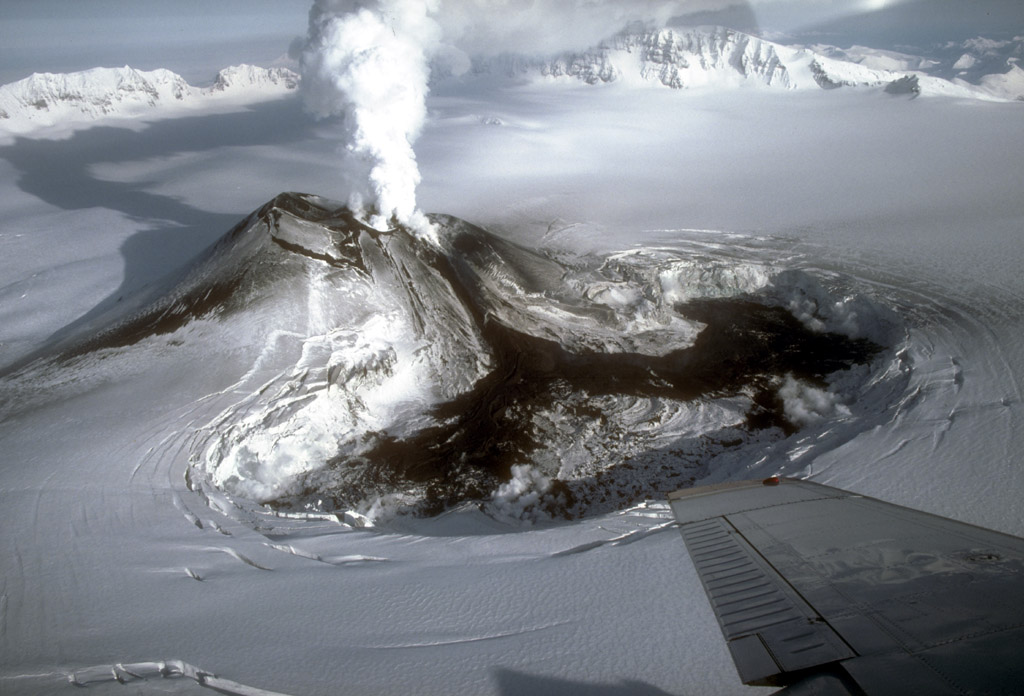
- Steam rising from the intracaldera cinder cone at Veniaminof volcano in the waning stages of the 1983 to 1984 eruption.

Highest point
- Elevation: 8,225 ft (2,507 m)
- Prominence: 8,199 ft (2,499 m)
- Listing: North America prominent 36th; North America isolated peak 60th
- Coordinates: 56°11′53″N 159°23′27″W

Geography
- Location within Alaska
- Location: Alaska Peninsula National Wildlife Refuge, Alaska, U.S.
- Parent range: Aleutian Range
- Topo map: USGS Chignik A-5

Geology
- Formed by: Subduction zone volcanism
- Mountain type: Stratovolcano with a summit caldera
- Volcanic arc: Aleutian Arc
- Last eruption: 2021

U.S. National Natural Landmark
- Designated: 1967

Mount Veniaminof (Russian: Вулкан Вениаминова) is an active stratovolcano on the Alaska Peninsula. The mountain was named after Ioann (Ivan Popov) Veniaminov.

The volcano was the site of a colossal (VEI 6) eruption around 1750 BCE. This eruption left a large caldera. In modern times the volcano has had numerous small eruptions (over ten of them since 1930), all at a cinder cone in the middle of the caldera.

Veniaminof is one of the highest of Alaskan volcanoes. Partly for this reason, it is covered by a glacier that fills most of the caldera. Because of the glacier and the caldera walls, there is the possibility of a major flood from a future glacier run.

The volcano recently began erupting on September 3, 2018, as magma broke through the summit and flowed down its slopes as a lava flow. Despite starting off as an effusive eruption, by November 20, the eruption became more intense and ash was reaching 20,000 feet, prompting the AVO to give a warning for aviation because of the ash posing a threat to aviation. Even an ashfall warning was issued for the nearby town of Perryville.

In 1967, Mount Veniaminof was designated as a National Natural Landmark by the National Park Service.

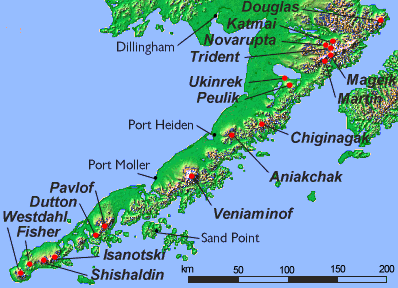
Map showing volcanoes of Alaska Peninsula.

== See also ==
- List of mountain peaks of Alaska
- List of Ultras of the United States
- List of volcanoes in the United States
