= Cape Greig =

Headlands of Alaska, US

Coordinates: 57°43′44″N 157°41′48″W

Cape Greig is a geographical feature of the Alaska Peninsula in the U.S. state of Alaska, where a 290-foot (88 meter) ridge juts into the Bering Sea. It is located on the Bristol Bay coast eight miles north of Smoky Point (Ugashik Bay) and 32 miles south of Goose Point (Egegik Bay).

The bay was named after the Russian admiral Alexey Greig. The highest point of the cape features a navigational lighthouse operated by the United States Coast Guard.

A marker placed on the upper seaward edge of the cape indicates the northernmost reach of the legal commercial fishing area called the Ugashik District by the Alaska Department of Fish and Game; the southernmost marker of which is located 20 miles south on the nearby Cape Menshikof.
