= St. Nicholas Church (Pilot Point, Alaska) =

Historic church in Alaska, United States

- U.S. National Register of Historic Places
- Alaska Heritage Resources Survey
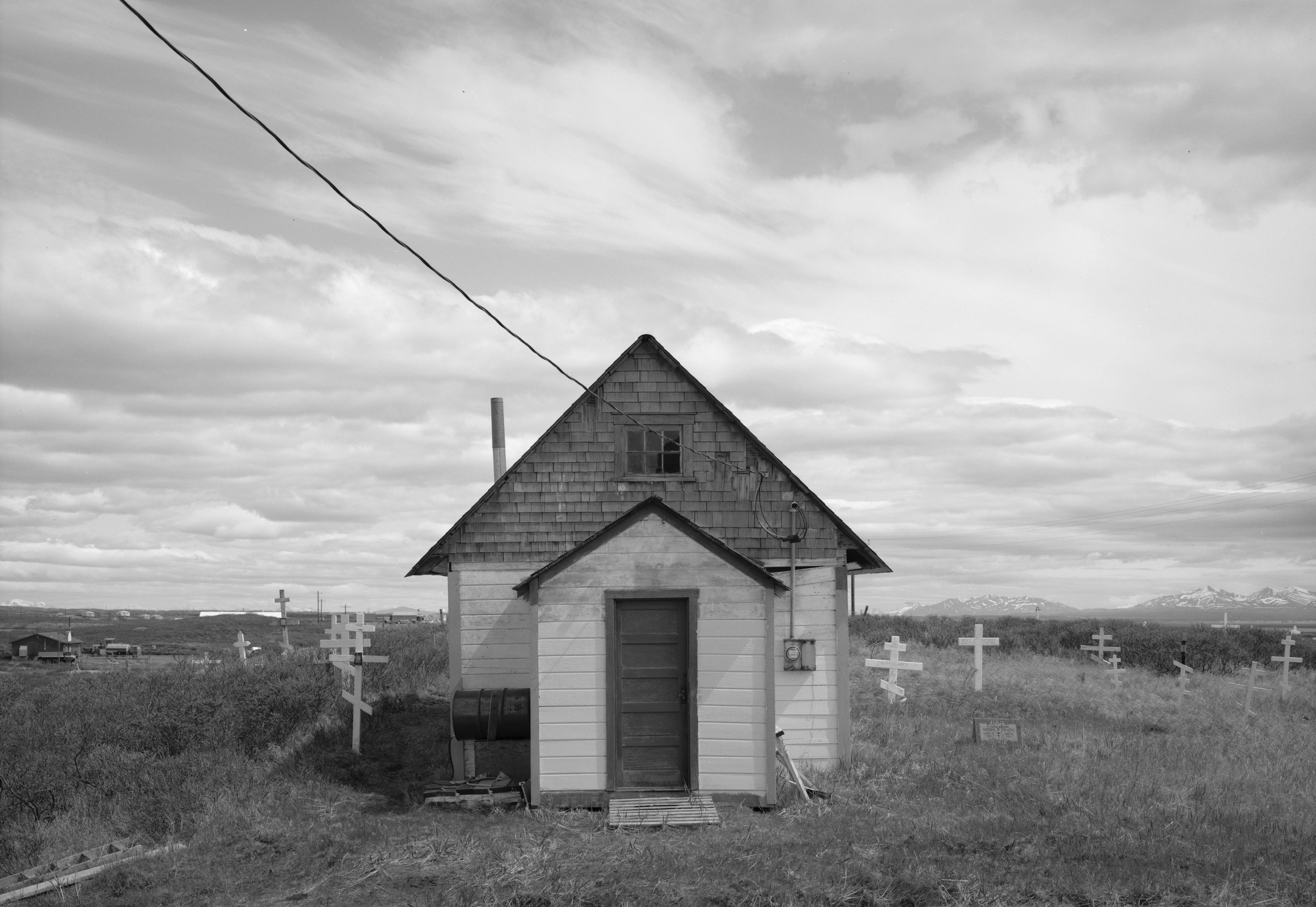

- Location within Alaska
- Location: Church Road, Pilot Point, Alaska
- Coordinates: 57°33′49″N 157°34′48″W
- Area: less than one acre
- MPS: Russian Orthodox Church Buildings and Sites TR
- NRHP reference No.: 80000754
- AHRS No.: UGA-033

Significant dates
- Added to NRHP: June 6, 1980
- Designated AHRS: May 18, 1973

The St. Nicholas Church in Pilot Point, Alaska, in Lake and Peninsula Borough, is a Russian Orthodox church whose historic building was listed on the U.S. National Register of Historic Places in 1980. It is now under the Diocese of Alaska of the Orthodox Church in America.

The listing included one contributing building (the church) and one contributing object (a bell). The church, according to one source, was built in 1886; according to another it was built in 1912. It is "a modest rectangular building", 48.5 by 15.5 feet (14.8 m × 4.7 m) in dimension.

It was listed on the National Register of Historic Places in 1980.
