= King Salmon River =

King Salmon River may refer to:

- King Salmon River (Nushagak River tributary)
- King Salmon River (Ugashik River tributary)
- King Salmon River (Egegik River tributary)
- King Salmon River (Admiralty Island)

== See also ==
- King Salmon (disambiguation)
- King Salmon Creek, in British Columbia, Canada
