= Ugashik Lakes =

Lake in the state of Alaska, United States

Upper Ugashik Lake
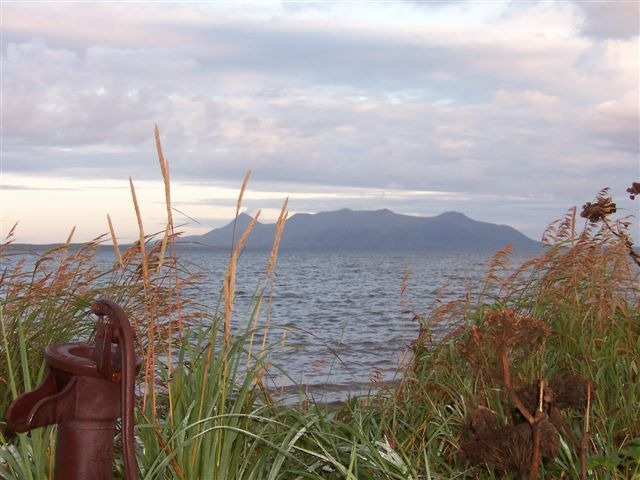
- Upper Ugashik Lake, with Blue Mountain visible in background

- Location within Alaska
- Location: Lake and Peninsula Borough, Alaska, United States
- Coordinates: 57°36′N 156°48′W
- Primary outflows: Ugashik River
- Basin countries: United States
- Max. length: 17 mi (27 km)

The Ugashik Lakes are two adjacent lakes along the Ugashik River on the Alaska Peninsula in the U.S. state of Alaska.

The lakes are world-renowned for trophy Arctic grayling fishing. The lakes also support large concentrations of lake trout, provide key feeding habitat for large numbers of sockeye and coho salmon.

- Upper Ugashik Lake is 17 miles (27 km) long and located at the head of the river, south of Becharof Lake and 22 miles (35 km) northeast of Ugashik, at 57°40′22″N 156°41′20″W.
- Lower Ugashik Lake is 11 miles (18 km) long and located south of Upper Ugashik Lake, 14 miles (23 km) east of Ugashik, at 57°31′09″N 156°53′55″W.
