= Dago Creek =

- Location of the mouth of Dago Creek in Alaska
- Etymology: possibly 'extended or narrow river'
- Native name: Kuigaa'aq (Alutiiq)

Location
- Country: United States
- State: Alaska
- Borough: Lake and Peninsula

Physical characteristics
- Source: small lake
  - location: 16 miles (26 km) southeast of Egegik
- Mouth: Ugashik Bay
  - location: 3 miles (5 km) southeast of Smoky Point, Alaska Peninsula
  - coordinates: 57°36′40″N 157°36′15″W
  - elevation: 0 ft (0 m)
- Length: 50 mi (80 km)

Dago Creek (Alutiiq: Kuigaa'aq [kuixaːäq]) is a stream, 50 miles (80 km) long, on the Alaska Peninsula in the U.S. state of Alaska. Beginning in a small lake 16 miles (26 km) southeast of Egegik, it meanders southwest across the flats to enter Ugashik Bay 3 miles (5 km) southeast of Smoky Point.

The name derives from the numerous Sicilian fishermen who would anchor in the protected waters during closed fishing periods and collectively celebrate their heritage with plenty of food and wine. At first used in a pejorative way, the Sicilians embraced the terminology and the name stuck, becoming official when the area was first definitively mapped in 1943. The area is still used as a small boat harbor for the nearby village of Pilot Point, especially with the completion of a bulkhead-style dock and boat launch in 1990.

Although a few fish swim up, and reportedly spawn in, its waters, the stream is primarily a drain for the multitude of small lakes, marshland and tundra of the coastal zone north of Ugashik Bay. The creek generally flows from north to south, beginning with the drainage from Dago Lake, a large but shallow freshwater lake located approximately 25 miles (40 km) north of the creek's mouth. It then begins a slow and meandering path towards the sea, with several oxbow lakes and false channels along the way. Though relatively narrow, the entire length of the stream has been navigated by vessels from the Bristol Bay fishing fleet.

The creek also serves to break the contiguous land mass of the north/east shore of Ugashik Bay, separating the village of Pilot Point from the neighboring community of Smoky Point. It also serves as a point of subsistence salmon fishing, although its waters are officially closed to commercial fishing activity. Local Alaska Natives also catch abundant supplies of small, oily, herring-like fish called smelt which helps supplement the local diet.

== See also ==
- List of rivers of Alaska
