= Pilot Point, Alaska =

City in Alaska, United States

Pilot Point, Alaska Agisaq
- City
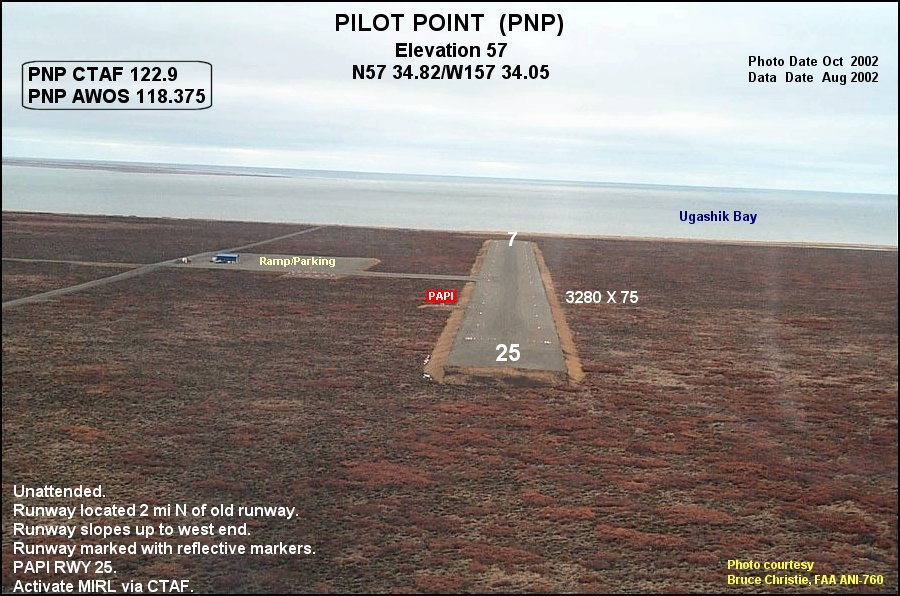
- Pilot Point Airport

- Location in Alaska
- Coordinates: 57°33′37″N 157°34′56″W
- Country: United States
- State: Alaska
- Borough: Lake and Peninsula
- Incorporated: 1992

Government
  - Mayor: Steven Kramer
  - State senator: Lyman Hoffman (D)
  - State rep.: Bryce Edgmon (I)

Area
  - Total: 154.80 sq mi (400.92 km^{2})
  - Land: 24.55 sq mi (63.58 km^{2})
  - Water: 130.25 sq mi (337.34 km^{2})
- Elevation: 82 ft (25 m)

Population (2020)
  - Total: 70
  - Density: 2.8/sq mi (1.1/km^{2})
- Time zone: UTC-9 (Alaska (AKST))
  - Summer (DST): UTC-8 (AKDT)
- ZIP code: 99649
- Area code: 907
- FIPS code: 02-60640
- GNIS feature ID: 1407992

Pilot Point (Alutiiq: Agisaq) is a city in Lake and Peninsula Borough, Alaska, United States, on the Alaska Peninsula. As of the 2020 census, the population of the city was 70, up from 68 in 2010.

== Geography ==
Pilot Point is located at 57°33′37″N 157°34′56″W (57.560226, -157.582267). Most of the community (village) is located on a high, ancient glacial moraine which abuts the eastern shore of Ugashik Bay six nautical miles upstream from Smoky Point and eighteen nautical miles (33 km) downstream from the village of Ugashik.

According to the United States Census Bureau, the city has a total area of 140.5 square miles (364 km^{2}), of which, 25.4 square miles (66 km^{2}) of it is land and 115.1 square miles (298 km^{2}) of it (81.93%) is water.

== Demographics ==
Historical population
Census	Pop.	Note	%±
1940	114		—
1950	67		−41.2%
1960	61		−9.0%
1970	68		11.5%
1980	66		−2.9%
1990	53		−19.7%
2000	100		88.7%
2010	68		−32.0%
2020	70		2.9%
U.S. Decennial Census

Pilot Point first appeared on the 1940 U.S. Census as an unincorporated village. In 1980, it was made a census-designated place (CDP). In 1992, it formally incorporated.

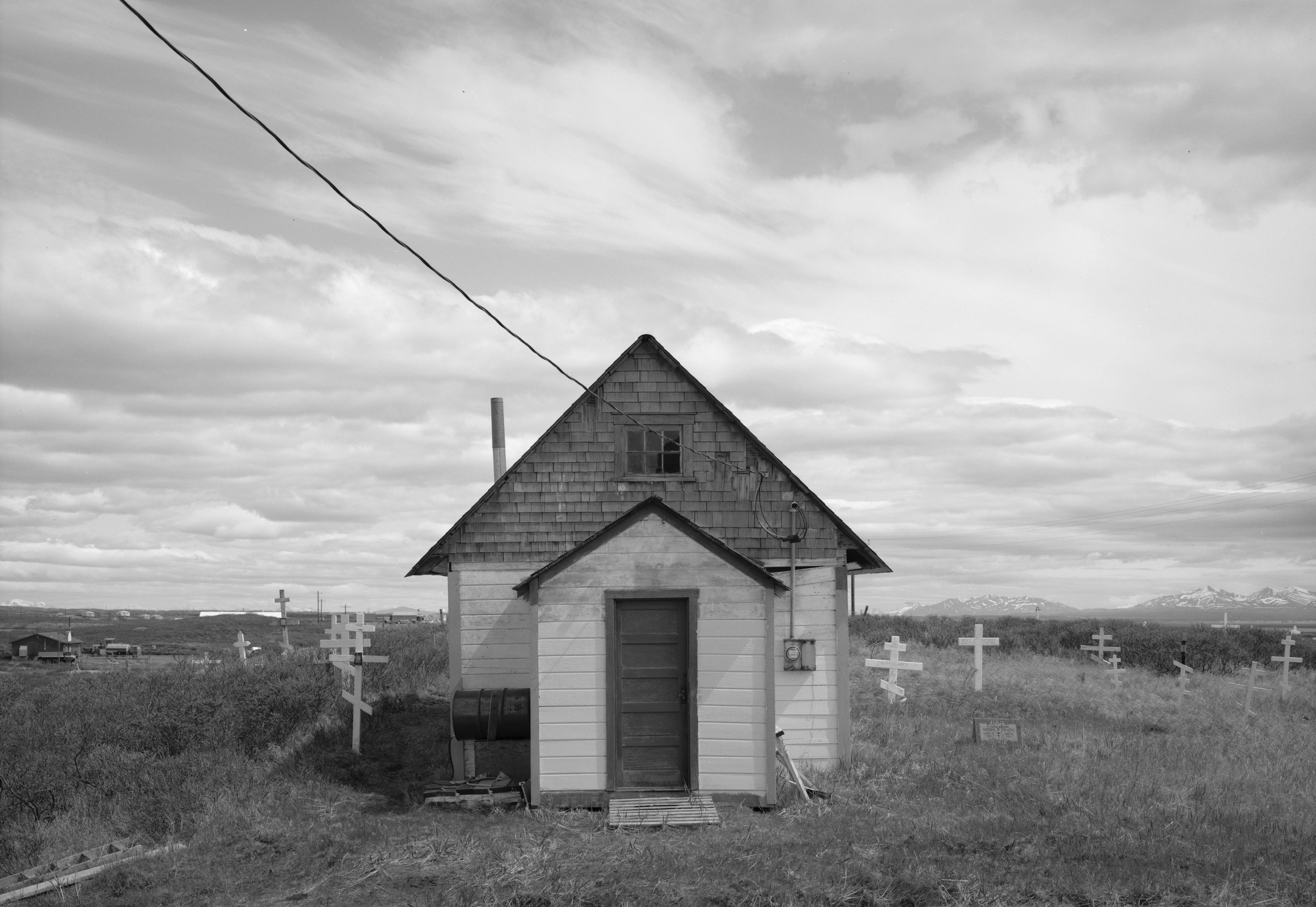
St. Nicholas Russian Orthodox Church

=== 2020 census ===
As of the 2020 census, Pilot Point had a population of 70. The median age was 36.0 years. 27.1% of residents were under the age of 18 and 15.7% of residents were 65 years of age or older. For every 100 females there were 150.0 males, and for every 100 females age 18 and over there were 155.0 males age 18 and over.

0.0% of residents lived in urban areas, while 100.0% lived in rural areas.

There were 21 households in Pilot Point, of which 4.8% had children under the age of 18 living in them. Of all households, 19.0% were married-couple households, 57.1% were households with a male householder and no spouse or partner present, and 9.5% were households with a female householder and no spouse or partner present. About 47.6% of all households were made up of individuals and 23.8% had someone living alone who was 65 years of age or older.

There were 69 housing units, of which 69.6% were vacant. The homeowner vacancy rate was 20.0% and the rental vacancy rate was 28.6%.

Racial composition as of the 2020 census
Race	Number	Percent
White	10	14.3%
Black or African American	0	0.0%
American Indian and Alaska Native	50	71.4%
Asian	0	0.0%
Native Hawaiian and Other Pacific Islander	0	0.0%
Some other race	0	0.0%
Two or more races	10	14.3%
Hispanic or Latino (of any race)	1	1.4%

=== 2000 census ===
As of the 2000 census, there were 100 people, 29 households, and 22 families residing in the city. The population density was 3.9 inhabitants per square mile (1.5/km^{2}). There were 69 housing units at an average density of 2.7 units per square mile (1.0 units/km^{2}). The racial makeup of the city was 14.00% White and 86.00% Native American.

There were 29 households, out of which 58.6% had children under the age of 18 living with them, 51.7% were married couples living together, 3.4% had a female householder with no husband present, and 24.1% were non-families. 17.2% of all households were made up of individuals, and 0.0% consisted of a sole occupant 65 years of age or older. The average household size was 3.45 and the average family size was 3.91.

In the city, the age distribution of the population shows 43.0% under the age of 18, 2.0% from 18 to 24, 32.0% from 25 to 44, 19.0% from 45 to 64, and 4.0% who were 65 years of age or older. The median age was 29 years. For every 100 females, there were 78.6 males. For every 100 females age 18 and over, there were 128.0 males.

== Economics ==
Both in historic and economic terms, Pilot Point has depended for its existence on the substantial seasonal returns of anadromous Pacific salmon, especially sockeye (Oncorhynchus nerka) which is the mainstay economic force of the entire region. Over half of the residents depend directly on the salmon fishery for their livelihood, with a small remainder depending on tourism, sports fishing and hunting, and a few government jobs.

The median income for a household in the city was $41,250, and the median income for a family was $36,250. Males had a median income of $23,750 versus $43,750 for females. The per capita income for the city was $12,627. There were 18.2% of families and 20.8% of the population living below the poverty line, including 18.9% of under eighteens and none of those over 64.
