= Smoky Point =

Smoky Point is a point of land in the U.S. state of Alaska, located at 57°36′44″N 157°41′24″W, where Ugashik Bay joins the much larger Bristol Bay. The most easily distinguishable landmark is the United States Coast Guard lighthouse which is visible to mariners on the eastern shore of Bristol Bay and all of Ugashik Bay. Located 10 to 12 miles from Cape Grey, the bluff at Smoky Point has long been considered the northern entrance point to Ugashik River.

The long beaches, shoals, and sandbars of lower Ugashik Bay and the eastern shore of Bristol Bay make navigation through the area particularly troublesome. Shipwrecks, even of smaller vessels, are not unusual. Deaths arising from vessels in distress and from drowning are also commonplace. The combination of extremely rough sea conditions—surf arising in Bristol Bay is commonly 1–5 m (3–16 ft) high—and cold water make survival rates extremely low.

On a single day in July 2006, to illustrate, two vessels of the Bristol Bay fishing fleet were lost on the shoals of Smoky Point. The crew of the fishing vessels Kaos and Silver Tide were rescued by heroic efforts of the M/V Farwest Leader in extreme weather conditions in the dark.

== Demographics ==
Besides the lighthouse, the area also hosts several homes and beach cabins belonging to the salmon gillnet families who fish the nearby waters, dotting the coastline from Dago Creek, approximately 4 miles (6.4 km) east of the lighthouse to Cape Greig, approximately 8 miles (13 km) to the north.

The area population typically exceeds 30 in summer, dropping to just a single resident in winter.

== Flora and fauna ==
The terrain consists of a series of long ridges which once comprised the ancient coastline of the Bering Sea punctuated by numerous long, narrow lakes and marshland which provide food and shelter for any number of nesting seabirds and annual migrations of the emperor goose, lesser Canada goose, Arctic tern, cormorant, mallard duck, fish duck, and others. The land is also host to the American bald eagle, sandhill crane, willow ptarmigan, barrenground caribou, brown bear, foxes, porcupines, ground squirrels, and wolves, to name but a few.

Although treeless, some stands of willow and alder grow in the more protected valleys between the ridges; the region is mostly covered with low shrubbery, mosses, and lichen, which comprise the tundra of the plain. The area is frequently buffeted by strong winds off the Bering Sea which keep the growing season short and cool, and undermines vegetation growing on the unstable sand dune ridges.
