= Mother Goose Lake =

Lake in the state of Alaska, United States

- Location within Alaska
- Location: Lake and Peninsula Borough, Alaska, United States
- Coordinates: 57°12′16″N 157°19′33″W
- Basin countries: United States
- Max. length: 6.4 mi (10.3 km)

Mother Goose Lake is a 6.4 mile long lake located at head of King Salmon River, on the Alaska Peninsula, 21 miles south of Ugashik, Aleutian Range. It was named in 1923 by R. H. Sargent, USGS, as "suggested by its goose-like shape." According to Sargent, the local name was King gautham giri Lake. The lake lies entirely within the Alaska Peninsula National Wildlife Refuge.

The watersheds of Indecision and Volcano creeks originating on Mount Chiginagak provide the majority of water input for Mother Goose Lake. The Mother Goose Lake watershed supports populations of Chinook Oncorhynchus tshawytscha, chum O. keta, coho O kisutch, pink O. gorbuscha, and sockeye O. nerka salmon as well as resident fish species such as Dolly Varden Salvelinus malma, and Arctic grayling Thymallus arcticus (USFWS 1994). Fish stocks originating from the Mother Gosse Lake drainage contribute to the subsistence, sport and commercial fisheries of the area. The contribution of Mother Goose Lake stocks to the subsistence and commercial fisheries is minor compared to other systems in the area (e.g. Ugashik lakes). Painter Creek, a tributary to the King Salmon River provides the majority of sport fishing opportunity in the Mother Goose Lake drainage.

Between August 2004 and August 2005 geothermal activity within the Mount Chiginagak volcano melted a portion of the summit glacier resulting in the formation of a lake in the summit crater. In summer of 2005 (exact timing of the event is unknown) the glacier damming the lake was breached allowing a significant portion of the lake to drain. The draining event, known as a lahar (flowing mixture of rock debris and water) deposited a large volume of what was assumed to be acidic water into the Mother Goose Lake drainage. The water within the Mount Chiginagak summit lake has not been sampled to determine the pH however; the Alaska Volcano Observatory (AVO) reports pH levels from similar volcanic summit lakes to be in the range of 0 to 3. In August of 2005 AVO members conducted an onsite investigated of the area. The AVO crew discovered a vegetation kill along Indecision Creek leading into Mother Goose Lake and along an unnamed drainage on the Chiginagak Bay side of the mountain. Additionally, AVO tested the water in Indecision Creek, Mother Goose Lake, and in the King Salmon River at the outlet of Mother Goose Lake (Figure 1) and reported pH values in the 2-3 range. Optimal pH range for fish is in the 6-8 range (EPA 1976), Hill (1974) reports that pH in the range of 2 -4 is toxic to most forms of aquatic life.

In late July 2005 the Alaska Department of Fish and Game (ADFG) received reports of dead Chinook salmon in the King Salmon River. ADFG staff went to Mother Goose Lake in early August 2005 to collect genetic samples from sockeye salmon and were unable to find any salmon present in the lake; additionally, subsequent aerial surveys did not locate any adult salmon in Mother Goose Lake (P. Salomone, ADFG personal communication). Given the lack of observed adult salmon in the lake and reports from a local lodge owner of no adult salmon in Painter Creek, we believe any adult salmon present in lake at the time of the lahar were killed and returning salmon detected the abnormally low levels and avoided the system.
