= Mount Kialagvik =

Mountain in Alaska, United States

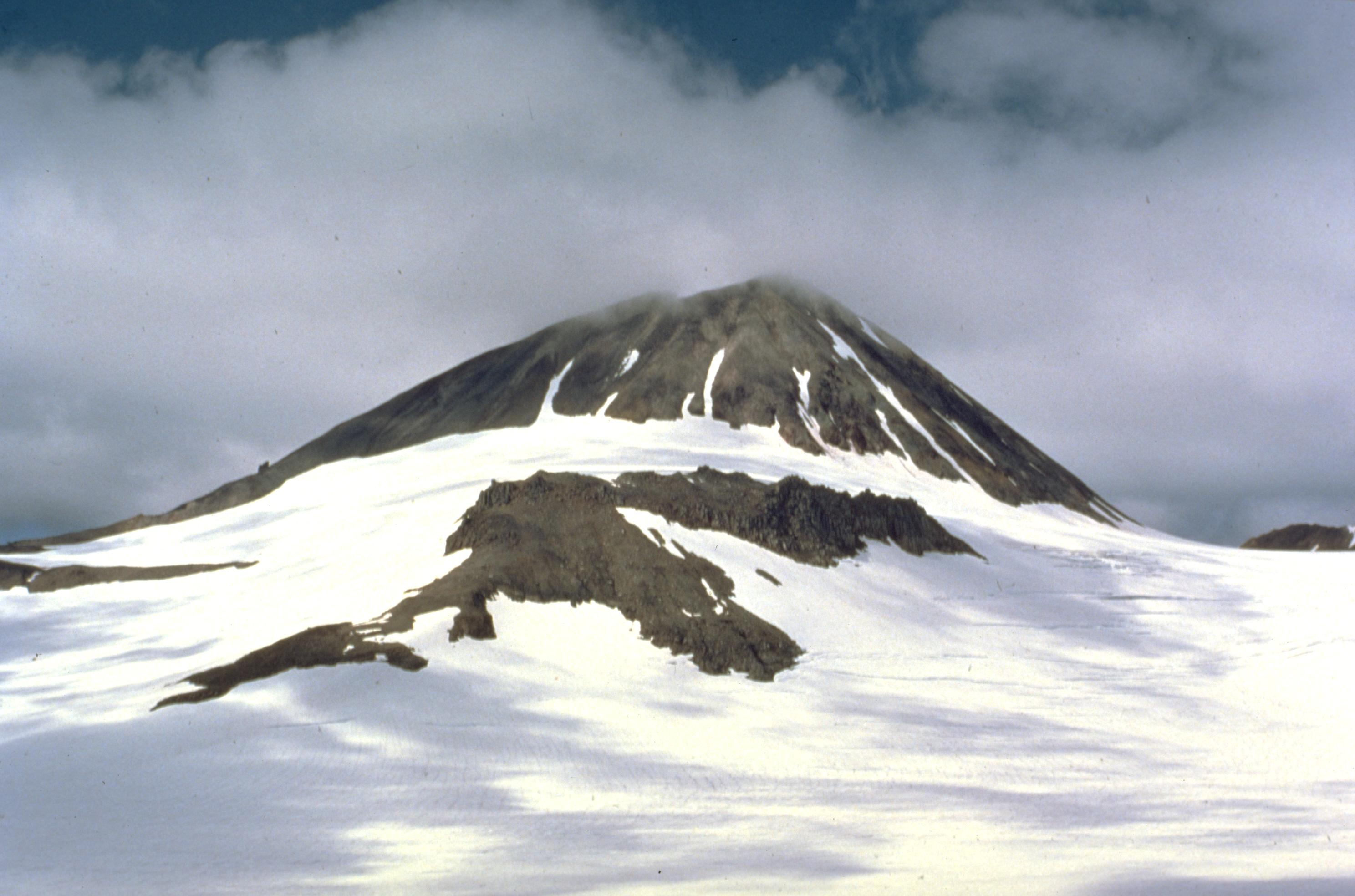
- A photo of Mount Kialagvik, taken by T.P. Miller of the United States Geological Survey in July 1979.

Highest point
- Elevation: 5,167 ft (1,575 m)
- Prominence: 3,445 ft (1,050 m)
- Listing: List of volcanoes in the United States of America
- Coordinates: 57.203°N 156.745°W

Geography
- Location within Alaska
- Location: Alaska Peninsula, Alaska, USA
- Parent range: Aleutian Range
- Topo map: USGS Ugashik A-3

Geology
- Formed by: Subduction zone volcanism
- Rock age: Holocene
- Mountain type: Stratovolcano
- Volcanic arc: Aleutian Arc
- Last eruption: Unknown

Mount Kialagvik is a small, poorly known stratovolcano on the Alaska Peninsula of Alaska, United States, located in the Aleutian Range about 10 miles (16 km) northeast of Mount Chiginagak. It is informally named after the Iñupiaq word for nearby Wide Bay. Kialagvik has not erupted in historic time.

== See also ==
- List of mountains in Alaska
- List of volcanoes in the United States
