= Mount Chiginagak =

Active volcano in Alaska, United States

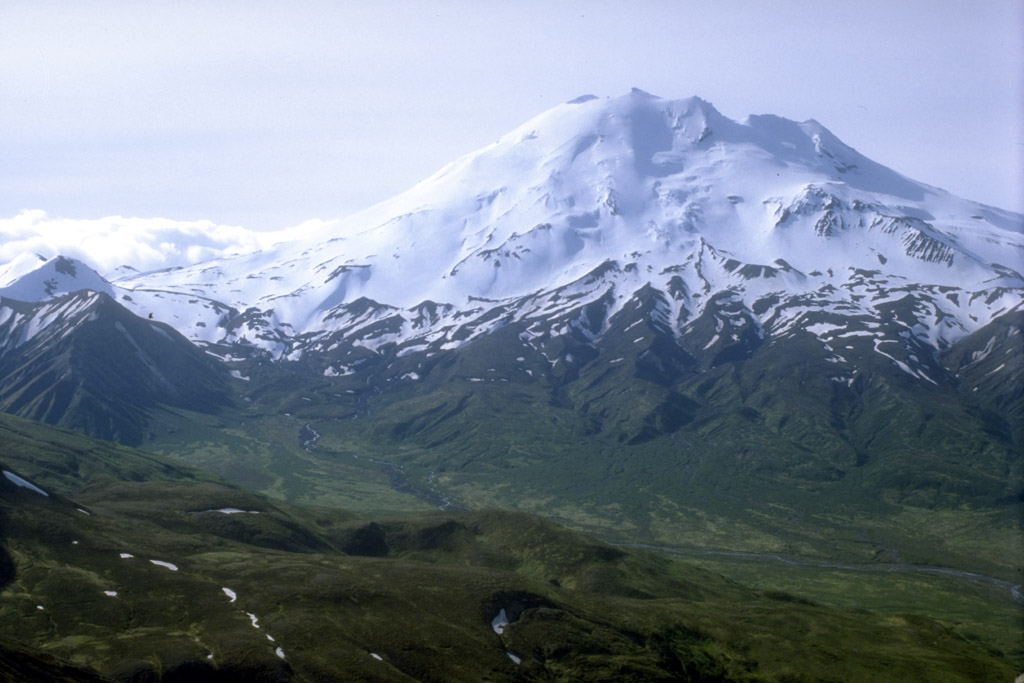
- View, looking southeast, of Chiginagak volcano

Highest point
- Elevation: 7,287 ft (2,221 m)
- Prominence: 6,675 ft (2,035 m)
- Listing: North America prominent 96th
- Coordinates: 57°08′01″N 156°59′29″W

Geography
- Location within Alaska
- Interactive map of Mount Chiginagak
- Location: Alaska Peninsula National Wildlife Refuge, Lake and Peninsula Borough, Alaska
- Parent range: Aleutian Range
- Topo map: USGS Ugashik A-3

Geology
- Formed by: Subduction zone volcanism
- Mountain type: Stratovolcano
- Volcanic arc: Aleutian Arc
- Last eruption: August 1998

Mount Chiginagak is a stratovolcano on the Alaska Peninsula, located about 15 km northwest of Chiginagak Bay.

== Eruptive history ==
An unglaciated lava flow and an overlying pyroclastic-flow deposit extending east from the summit are the most recent products of Chiginagak. They most likely originated from a lava dome at 1687m on the SE flank, 1 km from the summit of the volcano. Brief ash eruptions were reported in July 1971 and August 1998. Fumarolic activity occurs at 1600m elevation on the NE flank of the volcano, and two areas of hot-spring travertine deposition are located at the NW base of the volcano near Volcano Creek.

A 400 m (1,300 ft) wide and 105 m (344 ft) deep acidified summit crater lake at Chiginagak formed after November 2004 and before May 2005. In early May 2005, a catastrophic release of acidic water from the lake, with an accompanying acidic aerosol component, drained and flooded Indecision and Volcano Creeks with acidic water, traveled 27 km downstream and flowed into the Mother Goose Lake, headwaters of the King Salmon River. Extensive vegetation damage occurred along the flood route and Mother Goose Lake was acidified (pH of 2.9-3.1), killing all aquatic life and preventing the annual salmon run. The lake now drains from the summit through an outlet cave into Indecision Creek. Indecision Creek now usually has a strong sulphur odor, yellow color and a pH of 1.3.

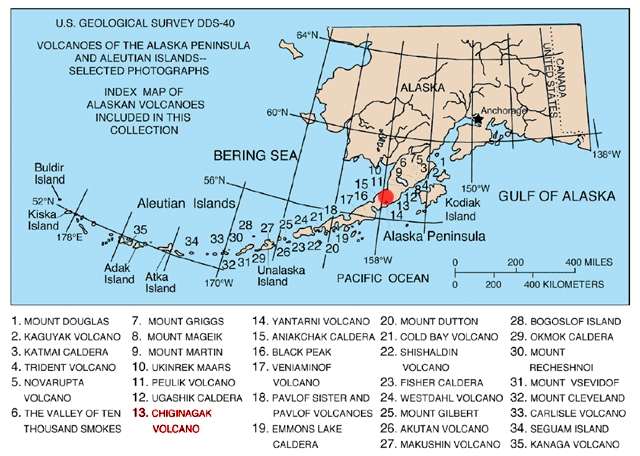
Map showing volcanoes of Alaska. The mark is set at the location of Chiginagak.

== See also ==
- List of Ultras in the United States
- List of volcanoes in the United States
