= Ugashik, Alaska =

Ugashik, Alaska Ugaasaq
- Census-designated place
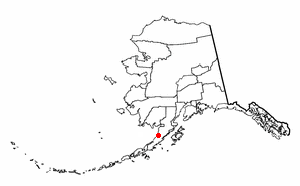
- Location of Ugashik, Alaska
- Coordinates: 57°32′3″N 157°16′8″W
- Country: United States
- State: Alaska
- Borough: Lake and Peninsula

Government
  - Borough mayor: Glen Alsworth, Sr.
  - State senator: Lyman Hoffman (D)
  - State rep.: Bryce Edgmon (I)

Area
  - Total: 267.69 sq mi (693.31 km^{2})
  - Land: 253.62 sq mi (656.87 km^{2})
  - Water: 14.07 sq mi (36.44 km^{2})
- Elevation: 30 ft (9 m)

Population (2020)
  - Total: 4
  - Density: 0.026/sq mi (0.01/km^{2})
- Time zone: UTC-9 (Alaska (AKST))
  - Summer (DST): UTC-8 (AKDT)
- ZIP code: 99649
- Area code: 907
- FIPS code: 02-80100
- GNIS feature ID: 1411486

Ugashik (Ugaasaq in Sugpiaq) is a census-designated place (CDP) in Lake and Peninsula Borough, Alaska, United States. The population was 4 at the 2020 census, down from 12 in 2010.

== Geography ==
Ugashik is located on the Alaska Peninsula at 57°32′3″N 157°16′8″W (57.534143, -157.268870). The community sits on the east bank of the Ugashik River, 10 miles (16 km) upriver (east) from its mouth in Ugashik Bay, an arm of Bristol Bay of the Bering Sea, and 25 miles (40 km) downriver (west) from the mouth of Lower Ugashik Lake. The CDP extends east as far as the west shores of Lower and Upper Ugashik Lakes.

According to the United States Census Bureau, the CDP has a total area of 266.6 square miles (690.4 km^{2}), of which 247.5 square miles (641.1 km^{2}) are land and 19.0 square miles (49.3 km^{2}), or 7.15%, are water.

The village of Ugashik is located some 6 miles (10 km) by air and 20 miles (32 km) by river east of the village of Pilot Point. The proximity to the salmon-rich waters of Ugashik Bay and available fresh water supply made it suitable as a location for a salmon cannery, Alaska Packers which operated until 1957. A family-owned company, Briggs Way Cannery, opened in 1962, and runs to this day. It is currently known as Ugashik Wild Salmon Co. and is continued on by the second generation of family and fishermen.

== Demographics ==
Historical population
Census	Pop.	Note	%±
1880	177		—
1890	154		−13.0%
1900	348		126.0%
1930	84		—
1940	55		−34.5%
1950	48		−12.7%
1960	36		−25.0%
1980	13		—
1990	7		−46.2%
2000	11		57.1%
2010	12		9.1%
2020	4		−66.7%
U.S. Decennial Census

Ugashik first appeared on the 1880 U.S. Census as the unincorporated Aleut village of "Oogashik." Of 177 residents, 176 were Aleut and 1 was Creole (Mixed Russian and Native). It returned in 1890 under the present spelling of Ugashik and also included 2 native settlements and Bering Sea Packing Company. Of 154 residents, 123 were Natives, 20 were White and 11 were Asian. It returned again in 1900 with 348 residents, though the racial breakdown was not ascertained. This was its highest ever population and was the 20th largest community in Alaska. It did not report again until 1930. It continued to report in every successive census except 1970. It was designated an Alaskan Native Village Statistical Area (ANVSA) in 1980. In 2000, it was made a census-designated place (CDP).

As of the census of 2008, there were 12 people, 7 households, and 2 families residing in the CDP. The population density was 0.0 inhabitants per square mile (0/km^{2}). There were 35 housing units at an average density of 0.1 per square mile (0.039/km^{2}). The racial makeup of the CDP was 18.18% White, 0% Native American, and 79.8 from two or more races, Alaska Native being one of them.

There were 7 households, out of which none had children under the age of 18 living with them, 28.5% were married couples living together, and 71.4% were non-families. 42.9% of all households were made up of individuals, and one had someone living alone who was 65 years of age or older. The average household size was 1.57 and the average family size was 2.00.

In the CDP, the population was spread out, with 0% from 18 to 24, 18.2% from 25 to 44, 72.7% from 45 to 72, . The median age was 50 years. For every 100 females, there were 120.0 males. For every 100 females age 18 and over, there were 120.0 males.

The median income for a household in the CDP was $28,750, and the median income for a family was $35,417. Males had a median income of $0 versus $0 for females. The per capita income for the CDP was $12,530. There were no families and 10.0% of the population living below the poverty line, including no under eighteens and none of those over 64.
