= Alaska Peninsula National Wildlife Refuge =

United States National Wildlife Refuge in southwestern Alaska

- IUCN category IV (habitat/species management area)
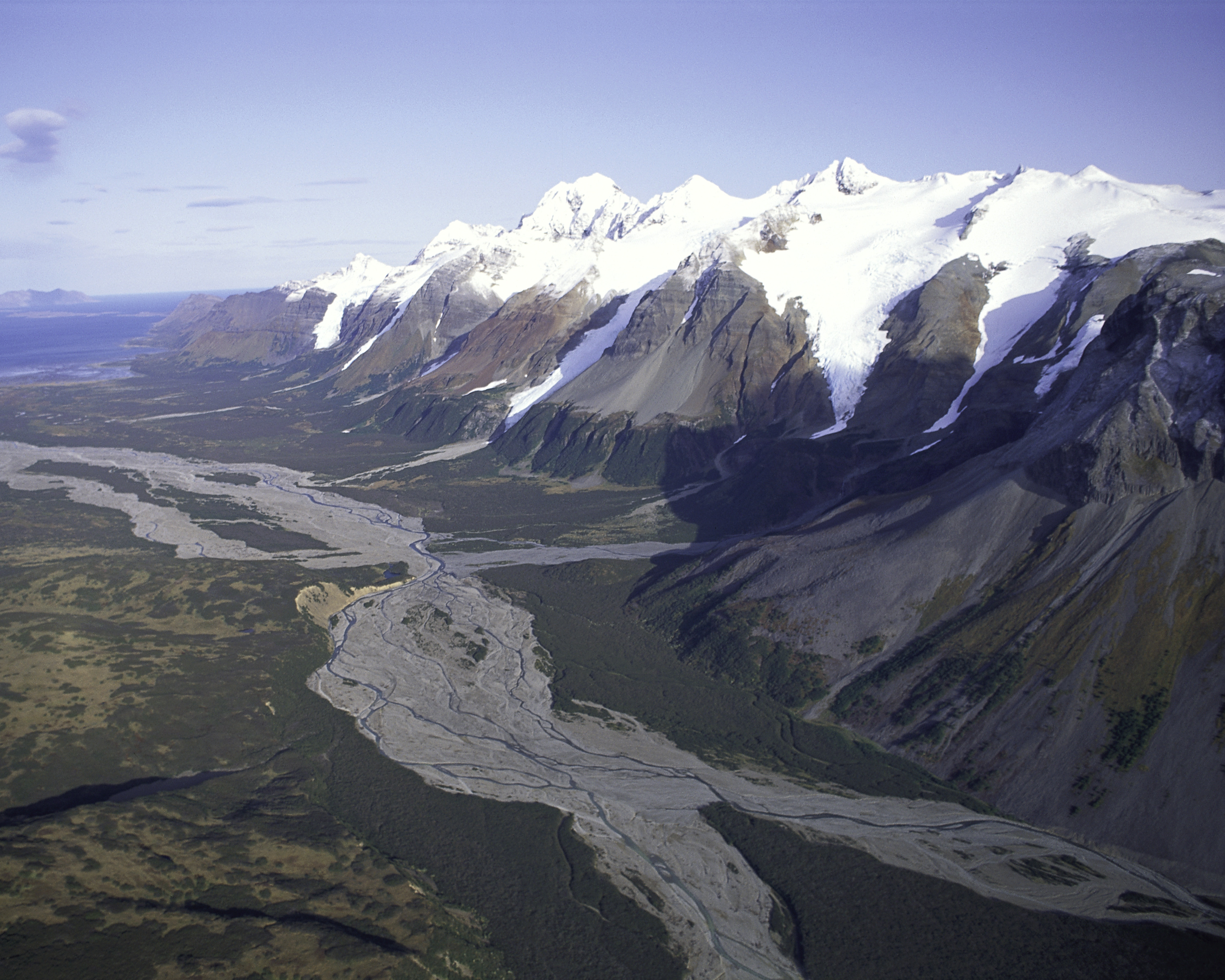
- Mountain Range Alaska Peninsula NWR

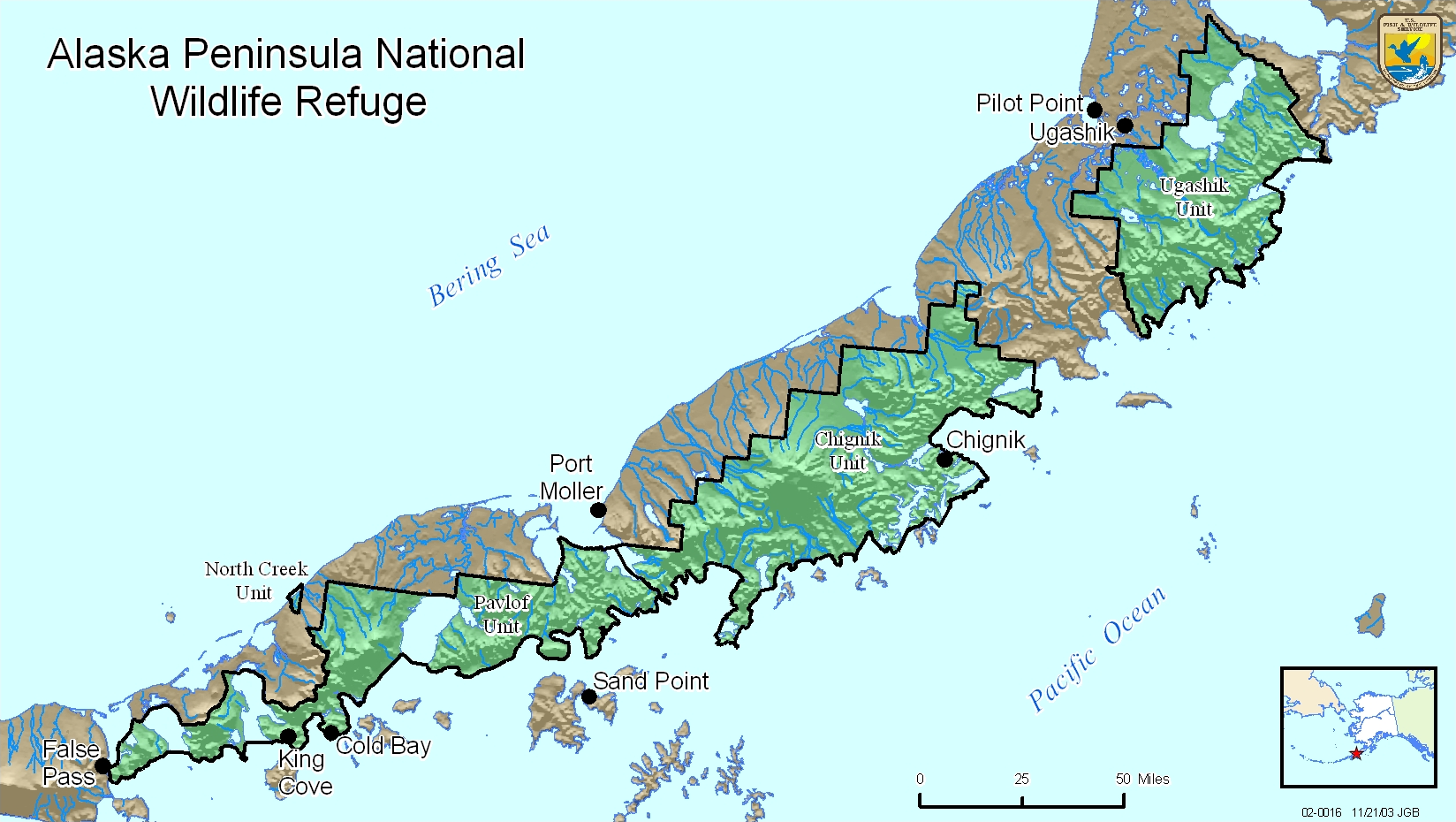
- Map of the refuge
- Location: Alaska, United States
- Nearest city: Cold Bay, Alaska
- Coordinates: 56°N 159°W
- Area: 14,421 km^{2} (5,568 sq mi)
- Established: 1980
- Governing body: U.S. Fish and Wildlife Service
- Website: Alaska Peninsula National NWR

The Alaska Peninsula National Wildlife Refuge is a United States National Wildlife Refuge in southwestern Alaska whose use is regulated as an ecological-protection measure. It stretches along the southern coast of the Alaska Peninsula, between the Becharof National Wildlife Refuge on its east and the end of the peninsula at False Pass in the west. In between, however, it is broken into sections by lands of the Aniakchak National Monument and Izembek National Wildlife Refuge. The refuge is administered from offices in King Salmon, Alaska and was established to conserve Alaska Peninsula brown bears, caribou, moose, marine mammals, shorebirds, other migratory birds and fish, and to comply with treaty obligations.

== History ==
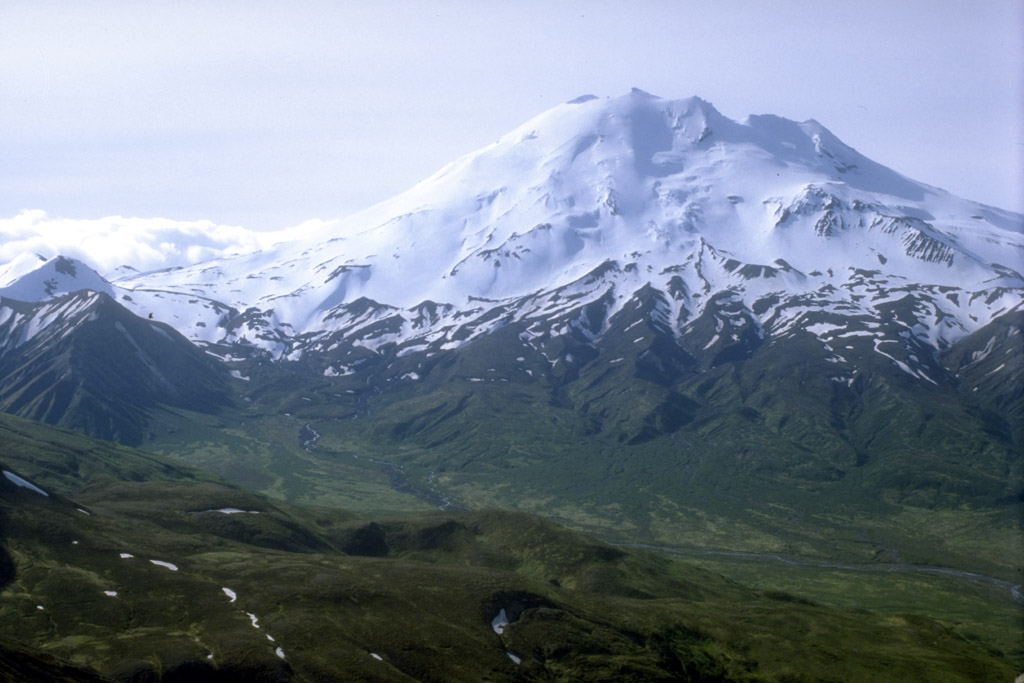
View of the Mount Chiginagak

The refuge was established on December 2, 1980, by the Alaska National Interest Land Conservation Act (ANILCA) following designation as a national wildlife monument in 1978 by the then President Jimmy Carter. U.S. Fish and Wildlife Service. In 1983, the Fish and Wildlife Service undertook the responsibility to manage the Becharof Refuge, along with the Ugashik and Chignik units of the Becharof National Wildlife Refuge.

In 1989 the park area was affected by the Exxon Valdez Oil Spill which devastated the Alaska Peninsula.

In an effort to determine species presence, distribution, habitat use, and migratory patterns, extensive studies have been conducted in the refuge. Biologists have studied extensively in the biologically rich Naknek River basin which provides an important habitat for thousands of ducks, geese and swans. From mid-March through mid-May, refuge biologists monitor waterfowl from established points from Naknek Lake to Kvichak Bay in Naknek. Biologists have been working in the area since 1992 to count waterfowl by species approximately four times a week.

Species common to the refuge include common merganser, common goldeneye, tundra swan, greater white-fronted goose, mallard, northern pintail, American and Eurasian wigeon, American green-winged teal, Canada goose, greater scaup, northern shoveler, red-breasted merganser, black scoter, and long-tailed duck. Working with Boreal Partners in Flight, the Institute for Bird Populations (IBP), and Earthwatch, the U.S. Fish and Wildlife Service undertook comprehensive landbird studies at Mother Goose Lake from 1994 through to 2001.

Between 1994 and 1999 over 110 Earthwatch volunteers used the scheme to educate themselves in bird biology. In conjunction with the National Audubon Society, the park has also hosted an annual Christmas Bird Count between December 14 and January 5 annually since 1986 to register birds in the corridor from the Kvichak Bay beach at Naknek to Lake Camp at the mouth of Naknek Lake. The refuge has sponsored a North American Migration Count on the second Saturday in May since 1998.

== Geography ==
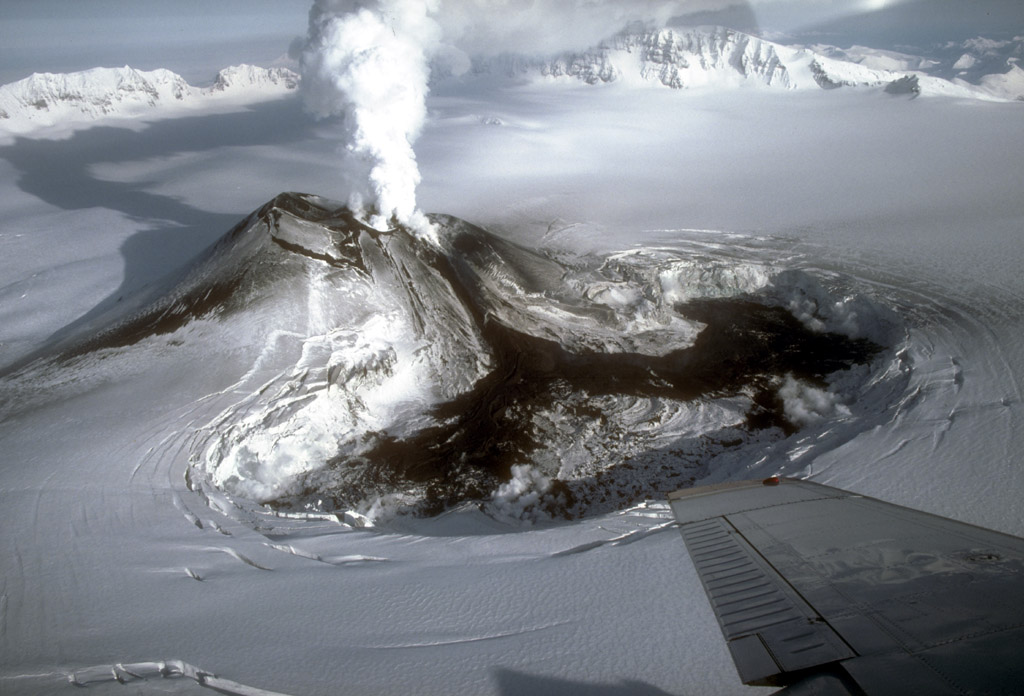
Mount Veniaminof.

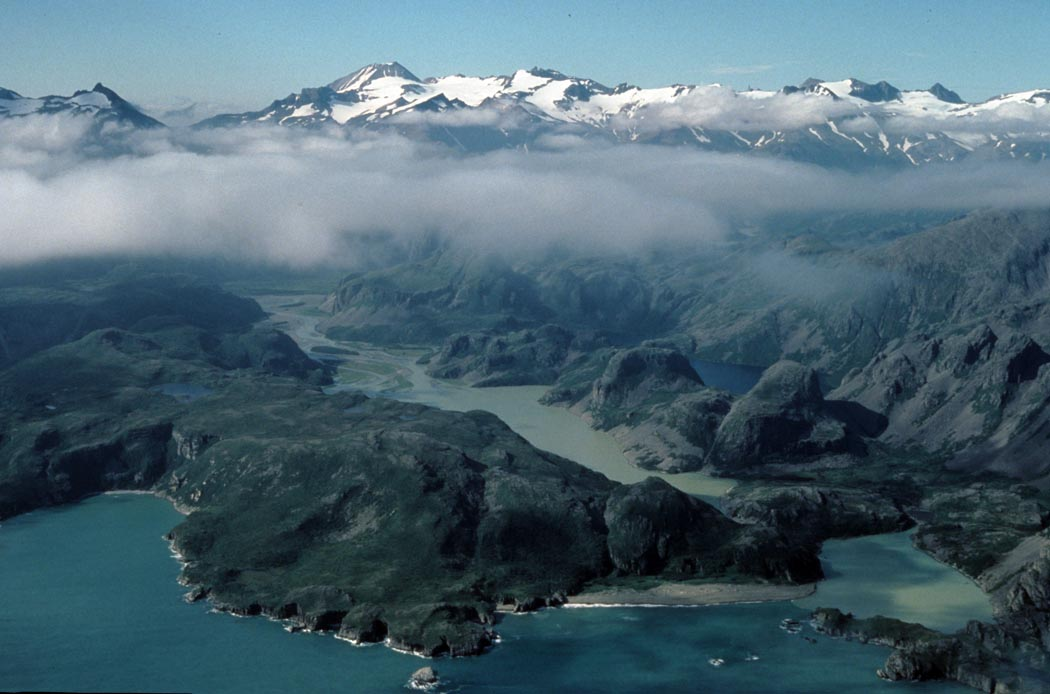
Port Wrangell

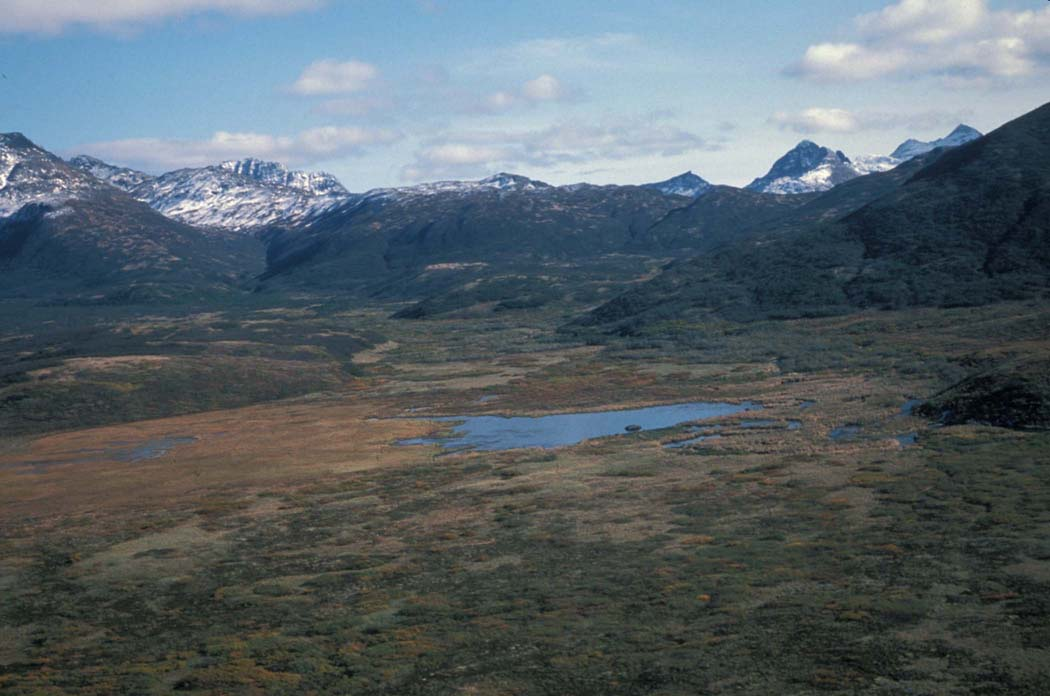
Landscape

The refuge covers an area of 5,568 square miles (14,421 km^{2}) and lies in the Alaska Peninsula. It spans Aleutians East Borough, Kodiak Island and Lake and Peninsula Borough. The Alaska Peninsula Refuge contains a number of geologic and scenic features, with a mixture of volcanic activity juxtaposed alongside glacial valleys and coasts under erosion.

The refuge contains the Chiginagak and Veniaminof volcanoes, the latter of which is one of Alaska's active volcanoes, and last erupted in 1995. The crater which is approximately 5.2 miles (8.4 km) in diameter contains a 25-square-mile (65 km^{2}) ice field, making it the most extensive crater glacier in North America. In 1967, Mount Veniaminof was designated as a National Natural Landmark. The Upper Sandy River has its source at Mount Veniaminof and flows down to form a delta above Sandy Lake.

In contrast to the volcanic landscape of the refuge, the Pacific coast of the protected area is characterised by rugged cliffs, bays, fjords, and streams. In particular the Castle Cape Fjords in the Chignik area is an extremely pronounced feature, with a strong erosion by the sea, with rocks shaded in contrasting dark and light tones. Notable streams drain into Agripina Bay and Port Wrangell from the glaciers and through the valleys of the refuge.

== Wildlife ==
The refuge supports a diversity of fish and wildlife and is an important nesting site for seabirds such as puffins, cormorants, kittiwakes, and guillemots, emperor geese, harlequin ducks, Steller's eider, and notably the bald eagle. All five species of Pacific salmon spawn including the commercially productive sockeye salmon run into the Chignik system. Sea lions, gray whales, harbor seals and sea otters can all be found along the coast. Alaskan brown bears are a common sight in the coastal meadows in spring and summer when they come to feed on the spawning salmon. Often as many as 500 bears may inhabit the Black Lake-Chignik Lake Area during August, making it one of the most dense seasonal concentrations of grizzly bears in North America. Caribou and moose are also under protection in the park. The moose in particular inhabit the Mother Goose Lake and the lines of the King Salmon River, also supporting populations of wolf packs, beaver, wolverine, river otter, two species of fox, snowshoe hare and Canadian lynx.
