= Ugashik Bay =

Coordinates: 57°33′47″N 157°38′32″W

Ugashik Bay is a bay of the Bering Sea in the U.S. state of Alaska. It is an elongated, comma-shaped estuary formed where the Ugashik River empties into Bristol Bay, on the western coast of the Alaska Peninsula.

Its waters are characteristically turbid and turbulent, the result of muddy feeder streams, frequent winds, and very high tides. Some Bristol Bay tides are thought to rank eighth highest in the world, and Ugashik Bay is greatly influenced by this tidal action.

The bay is bordered on the north by a sand beach stretching from Smoky Point on the west to the wide mouth of Dago Creek, on the east by a mud-and-sand shoreline running nearly true north–south past the village of Pilot Point to Muddy Point. The southern shore is a shifting series of mud-and-sand ridges, the northernmost and most prominent of which is called South Spit.

The bay influences a marine zone ranging from Cape Greig, 8 miles (13 km) north, to Cape Menshikof, 12 miles (19 km) to the south.

Ugashik Bay's weather is quite variable, especially during winter when storm systems frequently change climatological influences on the area. Storms blowing winds up from the North Pacific can make winter conditions relatively mild, even balmy; whereas winds from the Alaska Interior can bring clear and bitter cold conditions. Westerly winds blowing off the Bering Sea bring high humidity and biting cold, combined with coastal low clouds and fog, even in summer. This is so commonplace that Smoky Point was named from the frequent inclement weather.
