= List of islands of Alaska =

This is a list of islands of the U.S. state of Alaska. Approximately 2,670 named islands help to make Alaska the largest state in the United States.

== A ==
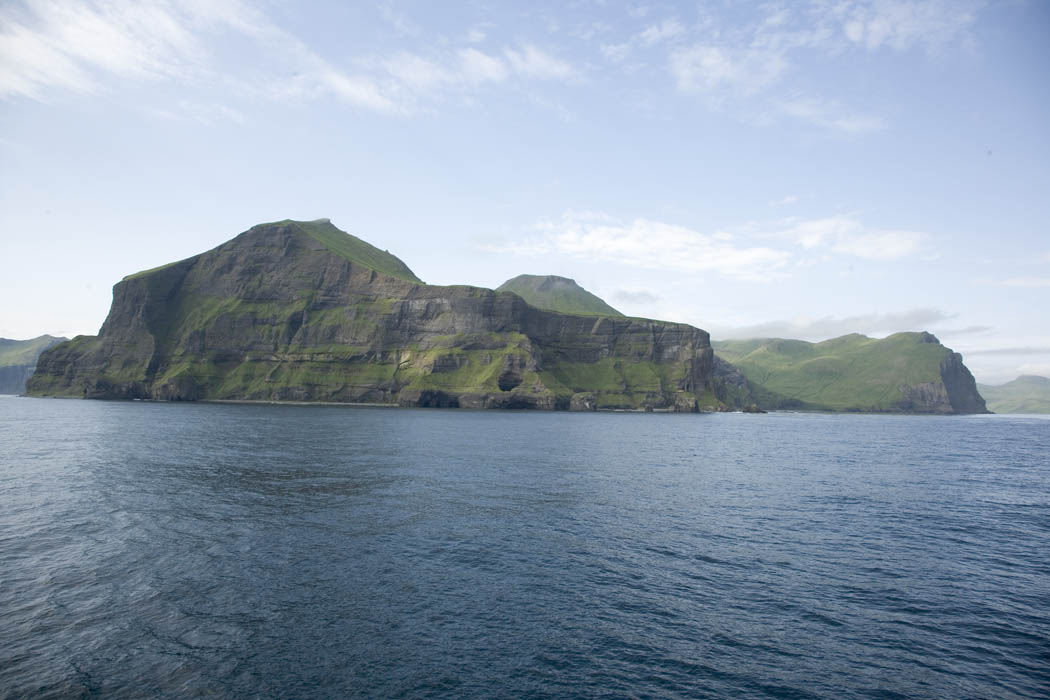
Akutan Island

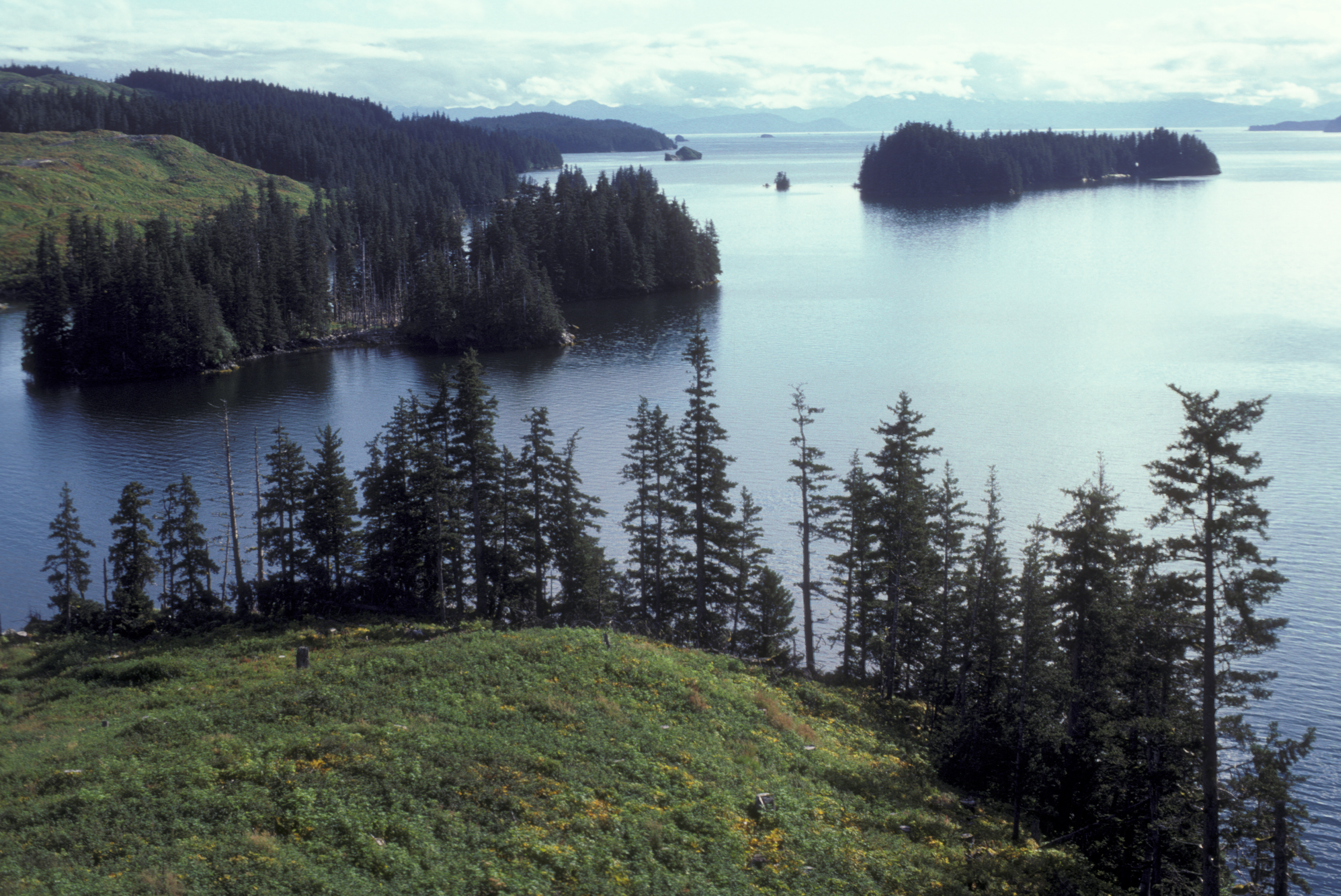
Afognak Island coastline at Kazakof Bay

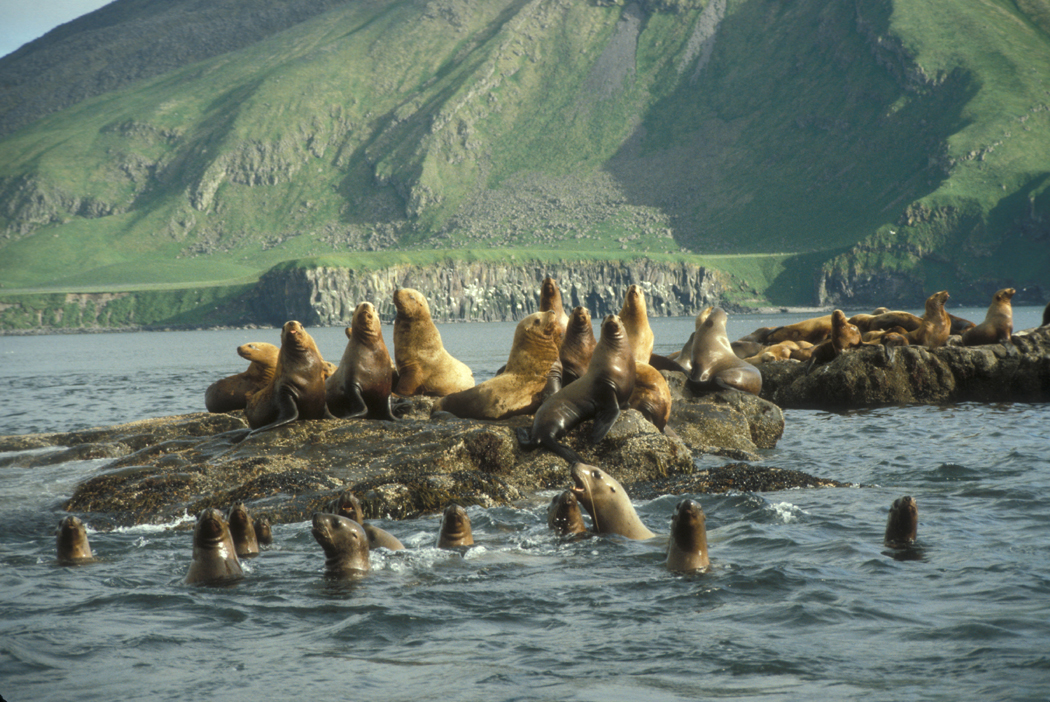
Amak Island, Steller sea lion haul out

- Aagumchiidalix
- Aalikam Tangii
- Aalus
- Aaron Island
- Abalone Island
- Abbess Island
- Abraham Islands
- Abraham Islet
- Abrejo Rocks
- Acorn Rock
- Adak Island
- Adams Island
- Admiralty Island
- Adugak Island
- Afognak Island
- Agaiak Island
- Agatax
- Agattu Island
- Aghik Island
- Aghiyuk Island
- Agligadak Island
- Aguchik Island
- Aguliak Island
- Aguligik Island
- Agusux
- Agux
- Ahnowiksat Rocks
- Aiaktalik Island
- Aikens Rock
- Aiktak Island
- Akhiok Island
- Akuchin Rocks
- Akun Island
- Akusha Island
- Akutan Island
- Alaid Island
- Alargate Rocks
- Alaska Island
- Alax Hatam-tanasuu
- Alberto Islands
- Aleks Rock
- Aleutian Islands
- Aleutika Island
- Aleutski Island
- Alexander Archipelago
- Alexander Island
- Alf Island
- Alice Island
- Aliksemit Island
- Alim-tanakix
- Alixtax
- Alligator Island
- Alma Island
- Almguist Rock
- Althorp Rock
- Amagat Island
- Amak Island
- Amaknak Island
- Amatignak Island
- Amchitka Island
- Amee Island
- Amelius Island
- Amgasis
- Amik Island
- Amlia Island
- Ammunition Island
- Amook Island
- Amtagis Islands
- Amugam-tangingin
- Amukta Island
- Anachlik Island
- Anagaksik Island
- Anamxix
- Anangula Island
- Ananiuliak Island
- Anchor Island
- Andersen Island
- Anderson
- Andreanof Islands
- Andrew Island
- Andronica Island
- Anglamax
- Anguilla Island
- Anguk Island
- Angusxus
- Anguvik Island
- Angyam-tanasuu
- Aniktun Island
- Animas Island
- Annette Island
- Anowik Island
- Ansley Island
- Anthony Island
- Antones Island
- Anyaka Island
- Apple Islands
- Applegate Island
- Applegate Rock
- Arboles Island
- Arbor Island
- Arcada Rock
- Arch Rock
- Arctic Island
- Ardiguen
- Arey Island
- Argo Island
- Argonne Island
- Arguello Island
- Ariadne Island
- Arnkil Island
- Arrecife Islands
- Arthur Island
- Arwirnuk Rock
- Ashiiak Island
- Aston Island
- Asuksak Island
- Asuzudam Tanasuu
- Asxanung Hachan-tanangis
- Ataku Island
- Atangax
- Atka Island
- Atkins Island
- Atkulik Island
- Atniliak Island
- Atsakirak Mound
- Attu Island
- Augustine Island
- Avatanak Island
- Avogon Island
- Avon Island
- Axel Lind Island
- Ayakulik Island
- Ayugasxis
- Ayuxas
- Aziak Island

== B ==
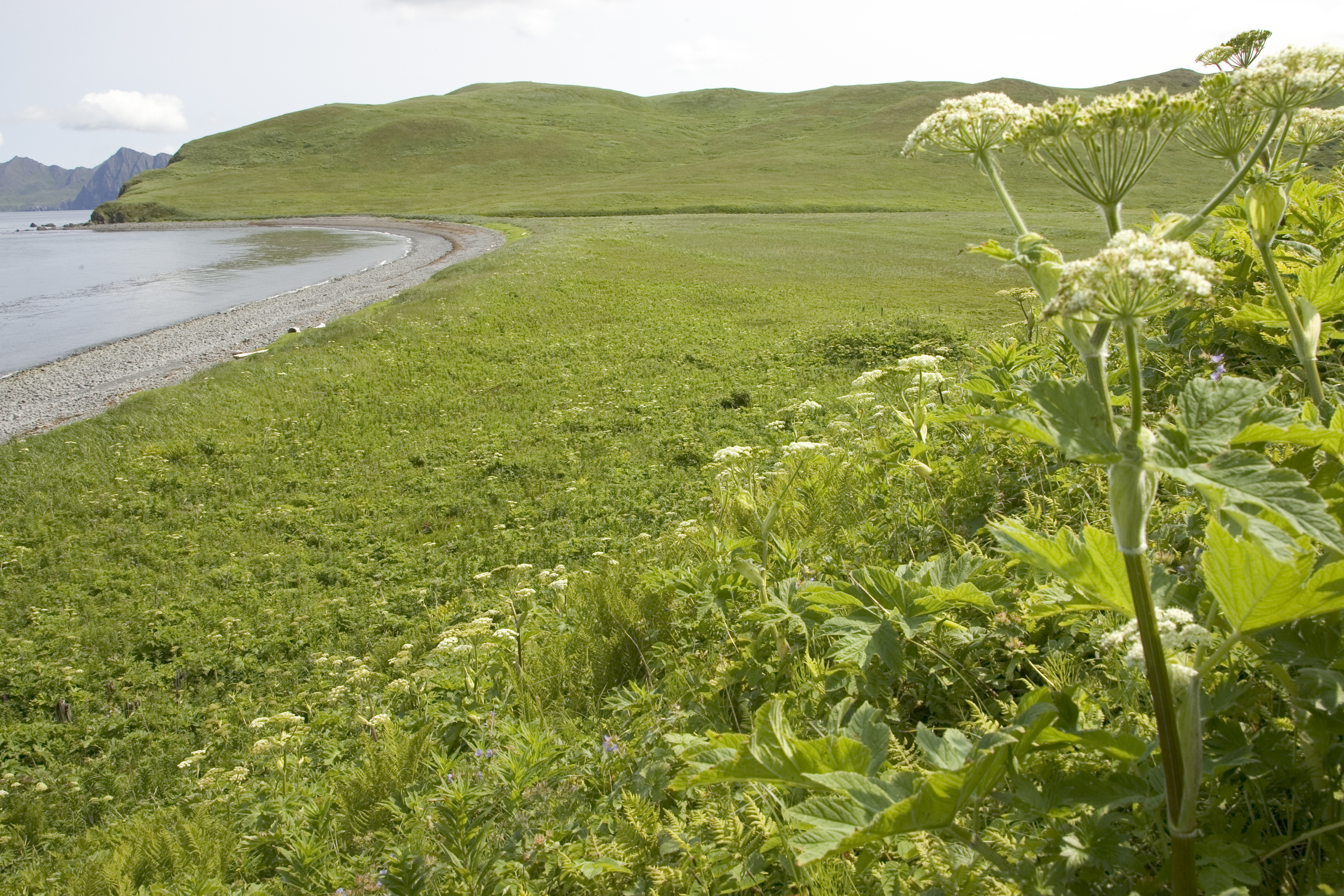
Bendel Island coastline

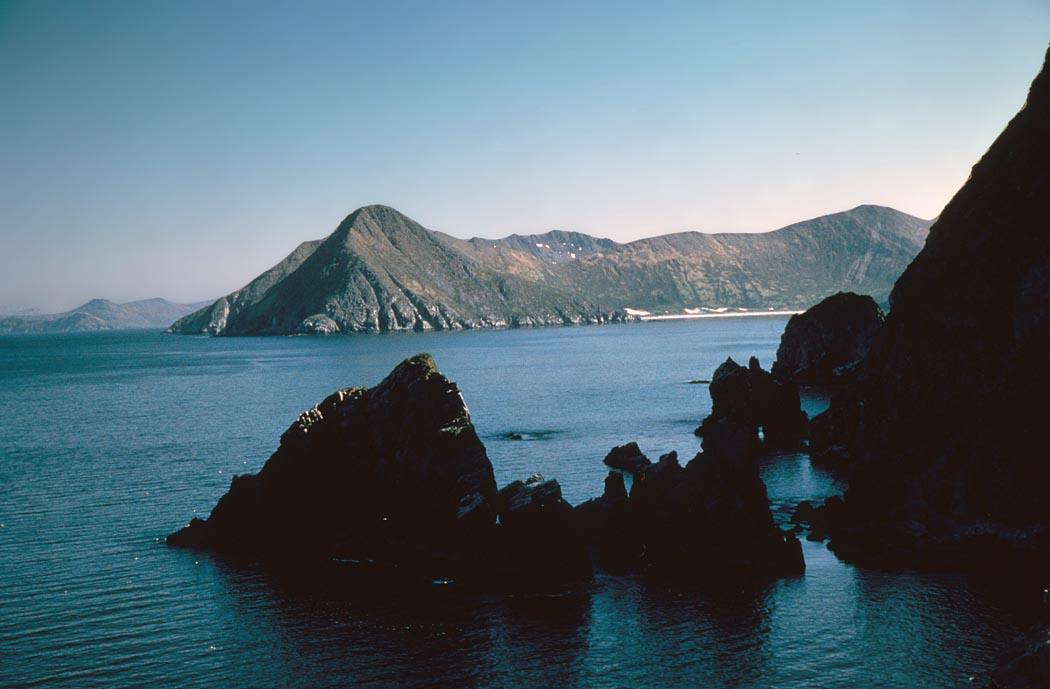
Big Koniuji Island

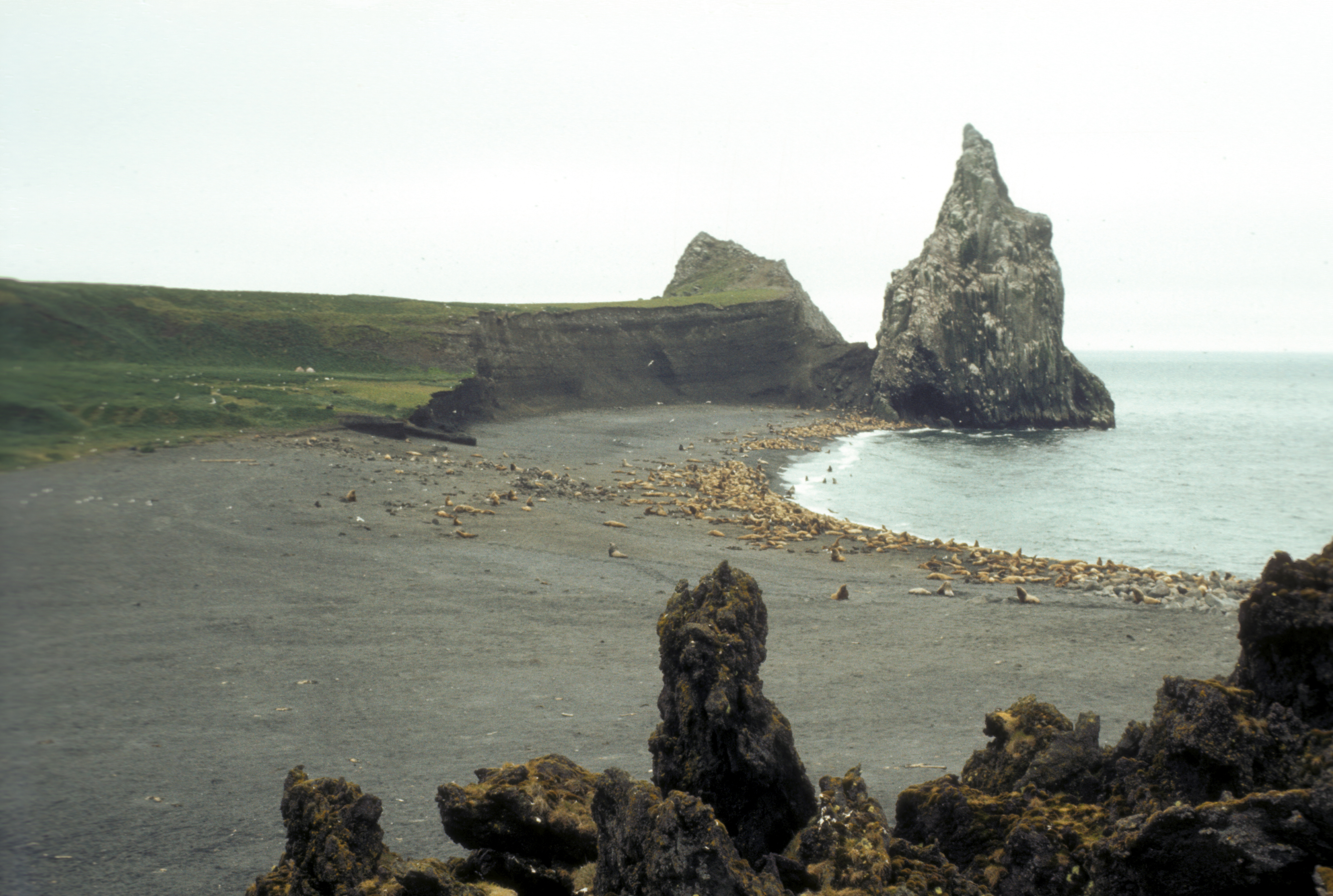
Bogoslof Island

- Babe Islands
- Baby Islands
- Back Island
- Bainbridge Island
- Baird Island
- Baker Island
- Balandra Island
- Bald Head Chris Island
- Ball Islets
- Ballast Island
- Ballena Islands
- Bamdoroshni Island
- Ban Island
- Barabara Island
- Baranof Archipelago
- Baranof Island
- Barbara Rock
- Bare Island
- Bare Islet
- Bare Rock
- Barlow Island
- Barlow Islands
- Barrel Island
- Barren Island
- Barren Islands
- Barren Rock
- Barrie Island
- Barrier Island
- Barrier Islands
- Bart Island
- Barter Island
- Bartlett Island
- Barwell Island
- Basalt Rock
- Basco Island
- Base Island
- Bashmakoff Rocks
- Basset Island
- Bat Island
- Battery Island
- Battery Islets
- Battleship Island
- Bay Island
- Bay Islands
- Bay Islet
- Beacon Island
- Bean Island
- Bear Bay Island
- Bear Island
- Bear Rock
- Beardslee Islands
- Beartrack Island
- Beauchamp Island
- Beauclerc Island
- Beautiful Isle
- Beavertail Island
- Beck Island
- Beck Rock
- Beehive Island
- Belknap Islands
- Bell Island
- Belvedere Island
- Bendel Island
- Benjamin Island
- Bennett Island
- Bentley Island
- Bentwood Island
- Beq'e Tach'itqeyi
- Beq'estsiq' Tuyu'uh
- Berger Island
- Beric Island
- Beringia Novaya
- Berry Island
- Bertoncini Island
- Besboro Island
- Bettles Island
- Betton Island
- Betty Island
- Beulah Island
- Biali Rock
- Bibora Island
- Bieli Rocks
- Big Bowlder
- Big Branch Rock
- Big Castle Island
- Big Eightmile Island
- Big Fort Island
- Big Gavanski Island
- Big Hazy Islet
- Big Island
- Big Koniuji Island
- Big Level Island
- Big Rock
- Big Rose Island
- Big Saltery Island
- Big Whitefish Island
- Biorka Island
- Birch Island
- Bird Island
- Bird Rock
- Birdsall Island
- Bishop Rock Island
- Black Island
- Black Rock
- Blackbird Island
- Blackburn Island
- Blacksand Island
- Blade Island
- Blake Island
- Blank Islands
- Blanket Island
- Blanquizal Islands
- Blashke Islands
- Bligh Island
- Blind Island
- Block Island
- Blodgett Island
- Blowdown Island
- Blue Jay Rock
- Bluefish Island
- Bluff Island
- Boat Island
- Boat Rock
- Bobrof Island
- Bocharov Island
- Bodfish Island
- Bogoslof Island
- Boidarkin Island
- Bold Island
- Bolshoi Island
- Bolshoi Islands
- Bonasila Island
- Border Rocks
- Borlase Rock
- Boswell Rock
- Botinski Island
- Boulder Island
- Bourbon Mist Island
- Box Island
- Boy Scout Island
- Brady Island
- Brant Island
- Breadloaf Island
- Breaker Number Two
- Breast Island
- Broad Island
- Brockman Island
- Bronaugh Islands
- Brother Islands
- Brown Bear Head Island
- Brown Rock
- Brownson Island
- Buck Island
- Bug Island
- Buldir Island
- Bull Island
- Bullfrog Island
- Bun Rock
- Burns Island
- Burnt Island
- Busby Island
- Bush Islets
- Bush Rock
- Bush Top Island
- Bushtop Island
- Bushy Island
- Bushy Islands
- Butler Rock
- Butterworth Island
- Button Island
- Buyan Islands
- Buzzard Rock
- Byers Island

== C ==
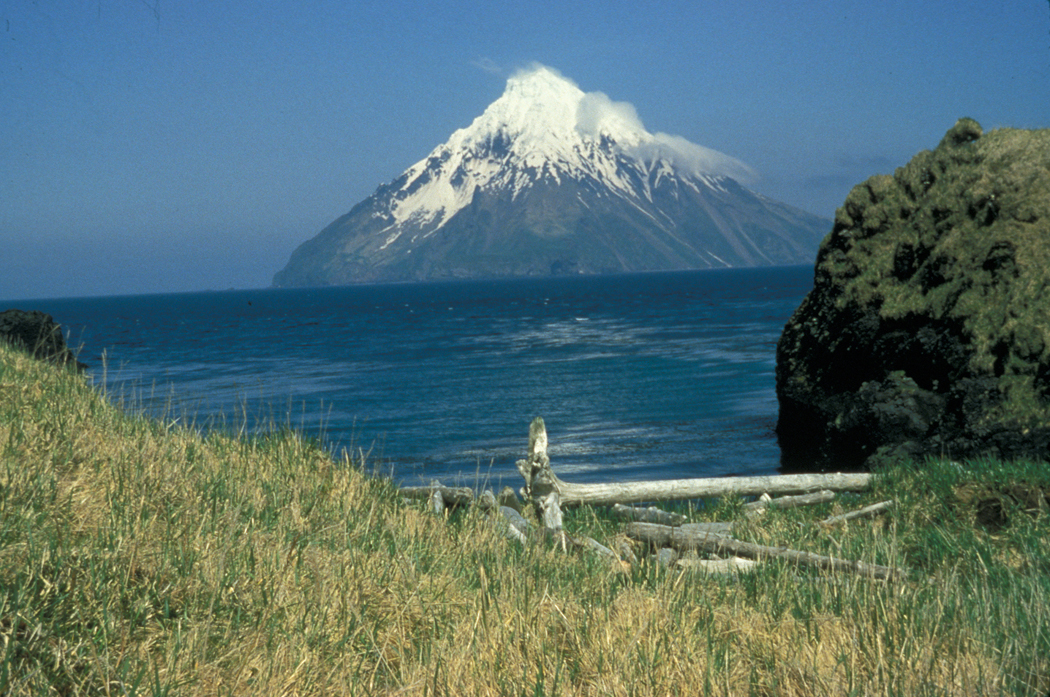
Chagulak Island, seen from Amukta Island

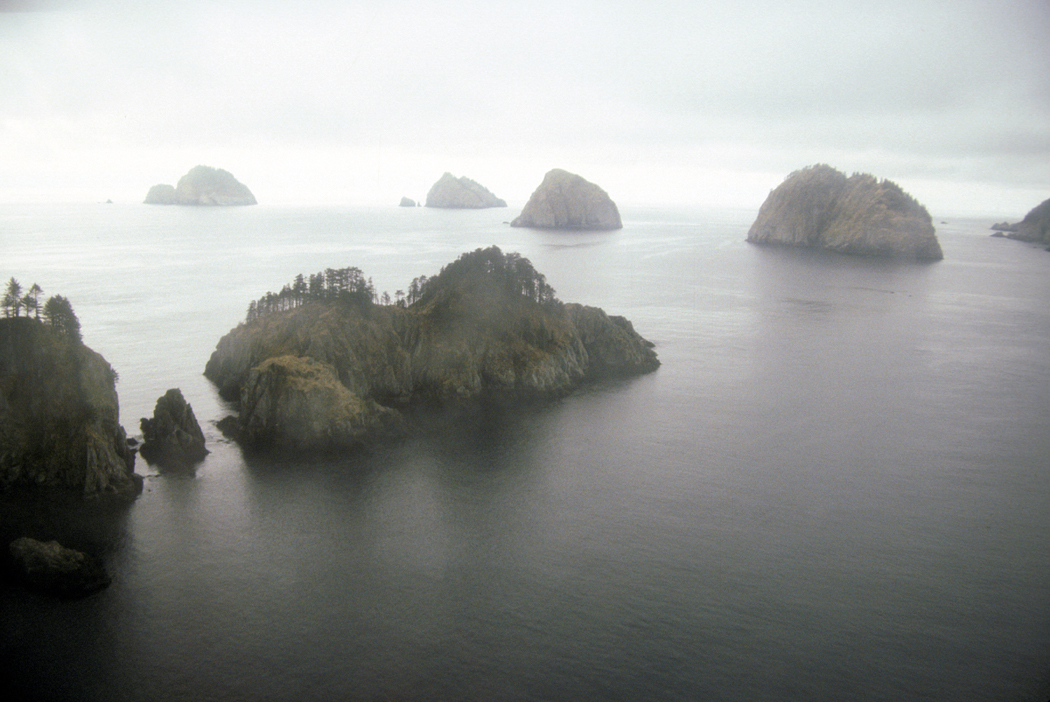
Chiswell Islands

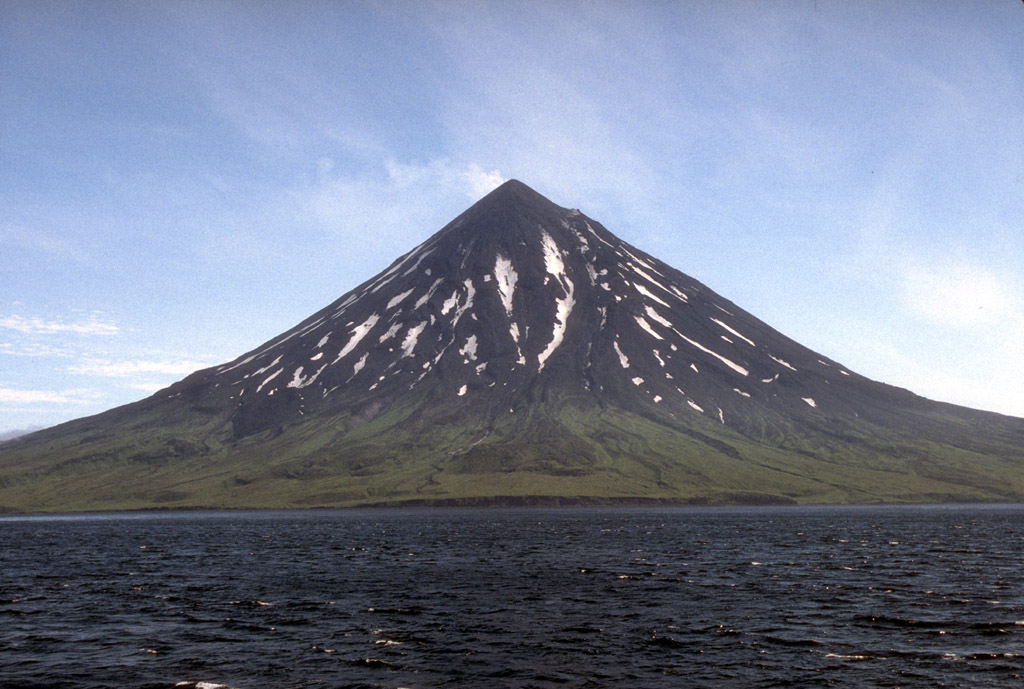
Mount Cleveland on Chuginadak Island

- Cabras Islands
- Cache Island
- Cairn Island
- Calligan Island
- Calming Island
- Cam Island
- Camel Islet
- Camel Rock
- Camp Island
- Canas Island
- Candle Island
- Cannon Island
- Canoe Island
- Canyon Island
- Cap Island
- Caracol Island
- Caribou Island
- Caribou Islands
- Carlisle Island
- Carlo Island
- Carlton Island
- Carolyn Island
- Carp Island
- Carroll Island
- Cascade Island
- Cascade Rock
- Castle Island
- Castle Islands
- Castle Rock
- Cat Island
- Catalina Island
- Cathedral Island
- Cathedral Rocks
- Catherine Island
- Caton Island
- Caution Island
- Cave Rock
- Cedar Island
- Cenotaph Island
- Center Island
- Center Islets
- Central Island
- Chagnagix
- Chagulak Island
- Chaichei Islands
- Chaika Rock
- Challenge Island
- Chaloo'ga Rocks
- Chamisso Island
- Change Island
- Chankliut Island
- Channel Island
- Channel Islands
- Channel Rock
- Channel Rocks
- Chapel Island
- Chapin Island
- Chapman Island
- Charcoal Island
- Chase Island
- Chasina Island
- Chat Island
- Chatham Island
- Chenega Island
- Chernabura Island
- Cherni Island
- Chetlechak Island
- Cheval Island
- Chiachi Island
- Chiachi Islands
- Chichagof Island
- Chicken Island
- Chignik Island
- Chiidam Udagan Hachan Tanangis
- Chilkat Islands
- Chimney Rock
- Chiniak Island
- Chips Island
- Chirikof Island
- Chisak Island
- Chisik Island
- Chistiakof Island
- Chiswell Islands
- Chock Island
- Chokoyik Island
- Chowiet Island
- Christmas Island
- Chuckskin Rocks
- Chugach Islands
- Chugachik Island
- Chuginadak Island
- Chugul Island
- Chunixsam Hachan Tanaa
- Chyaguulax
- Circle Island
- Clam Island
- Clam Islands
- Clare Island
- Clark Island
- Clay Island
- Cleft Island
- Cliff Island
- Clifford Island
- Clover Island
- Clover Rock
- Cloverleaf Island
- Clubbing Rocks
- Clump Island
- Cob Island
- Cobb Island
- Coffman Island
- Coghlan Island
- Cohen Island
- Cole Island
- Colt Island
- Column Rocks
- Comma Island
- Composite Island
- Conclusion Island
- Cone Island
- Coney Island
- Cook Island
- Coon Island
- Cooper Island
- Cooper Islands
- Coposo Island
- Cora Island
- Corlies Islands
- Cormorant Island
- Coronados Islands
- Coronation Island
- Corwin Rock
- Cottle Island
- Cottonwood Island
- Cottonwood Islands
- Couverden Island
- Couverden Rock
- Cove Island
- Cow Island
- Cowanesque Rock
- Crab Island
- Crafton Island
- Craig Island
- Crescent Island
- Crescent Moon Island
- Cristina Island
- Crone Island
- Cronin Island
- Crooked Island
- Cross Island
- Crosswise Islands
- Crow Island
- Crowley Rock
- Cruz Islands
- Cub Island
- Culebra Islands
- Culebrina Island
- Culross Island
- Cupcake Island
- Cygnet Island
- Cynthia Island

== D ==
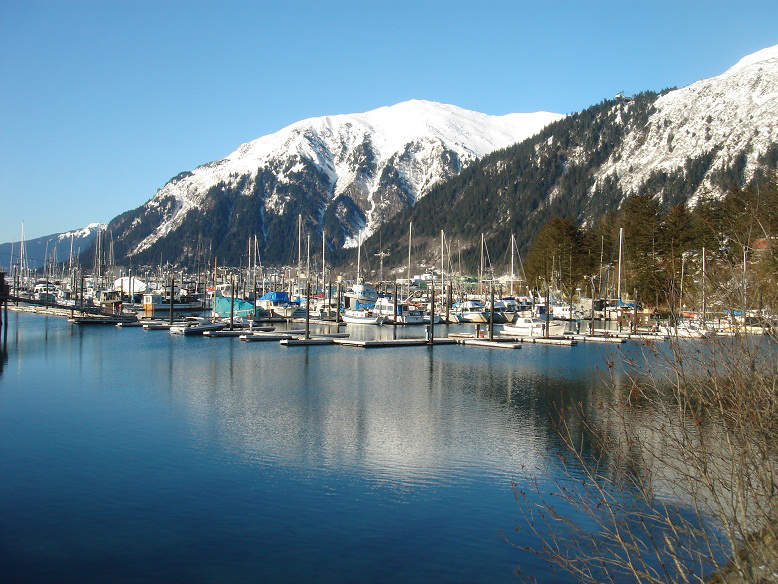
Douglas Harbor, Douglas Island

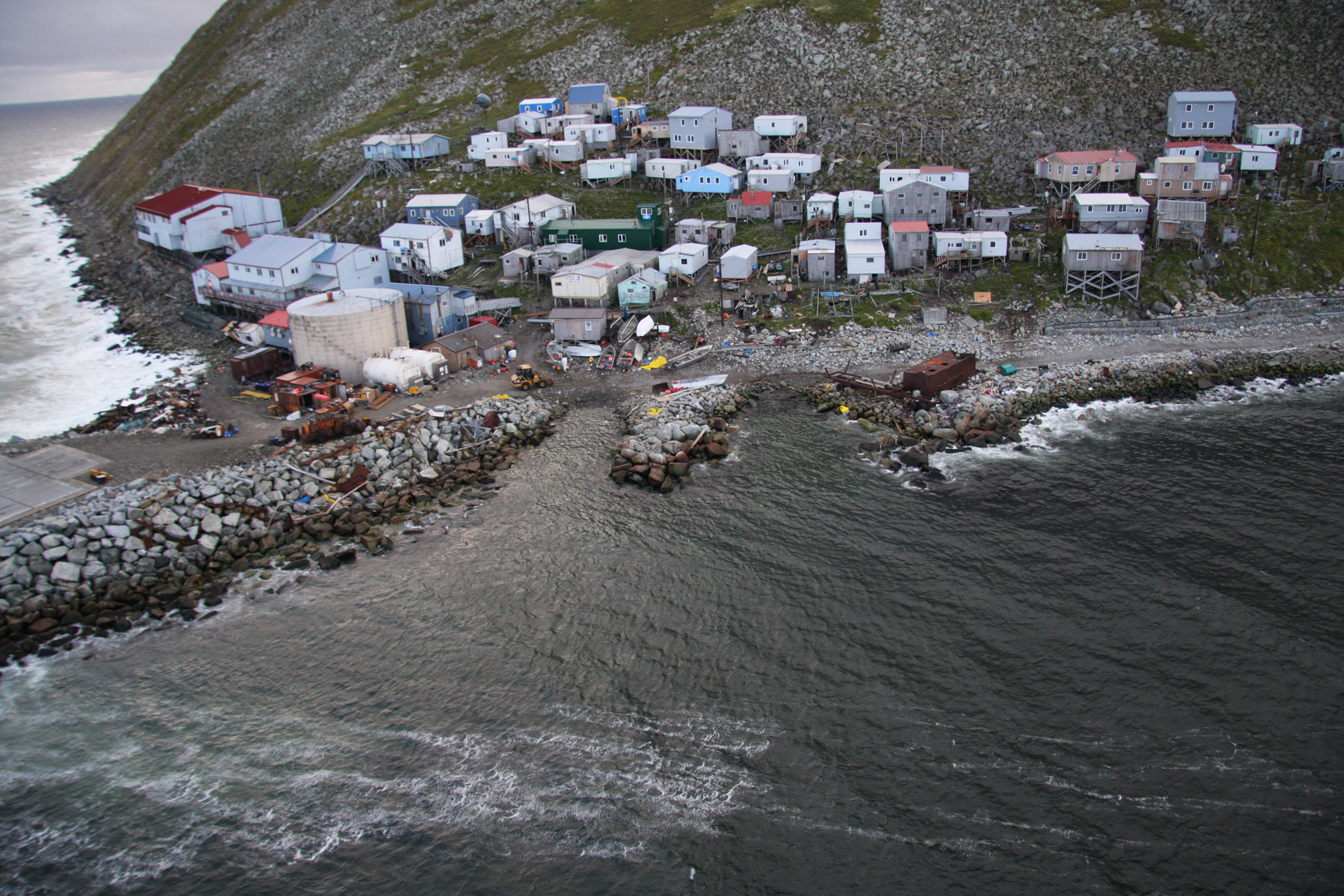
A village on Little Diomede Island

- Dainty Island
- Daisy Island
- Dalasuga Island
- Dall Island
- Danger Island
- Dark Island
- Darvin Island
- Dasani Islands
- Dasha Island
- Datzkoo Islands
- David Island
- Davidof Island
- Daviidam
- Davis Rock
- Daykoo Islands
- De Long Islands
- Deacons Rock
- Dead Island
- Dead Pine Island
- Dead Tree Island
- Deadman Island
- Deadmans Island
- Deception Island
- Deer Island (Panhandle)
- Deer Island (Aleutian)
- Deer Rocks
- Dehgega Inejaht
- Dehi Beq'e De'uhi
- Deichman Island
- Deichman Rock
- Delarof Islands
- Delenia Island
- Dell Island
- Delphin Island
- Delta Island
- Delta Islands
- Deranof Island
- Derbin Island
- Derickson Island
- Deuce Island
- Devil Island
- Devils Finger
- Dewey Rocks
- Diamond Island
- Dinkum Rocks
- Dinkum Sands
- Diomede Islands
- Dippy Island
- Discoverer Island
- Disk Island
- Ditto Islands
- Diver Islands
- Diver Rocks
- Divide Island
- Division Island
- Doctor Island
- Dog Island
- Dogfish Island
- Doggie Island
- Dolgoi Island
- Dome Islets
- Dome Rock
- Dora Island
- Dorn Island
- Dot Island
- Double Island
- Double Islands
- Douglas Island
- Douglass Island
- Dove Island
- Doyle Island
- Drag Island
- Drake Island
- Drug Island
- Dry Island
- Dry Rock
- Dry Spruce Island
- Duchess Island
- Duck Island
- Duck Islands
- Duke Island
- Dusdikda
- Dushkot Island
- Dusk Islands
- Dutch Group

== E ==
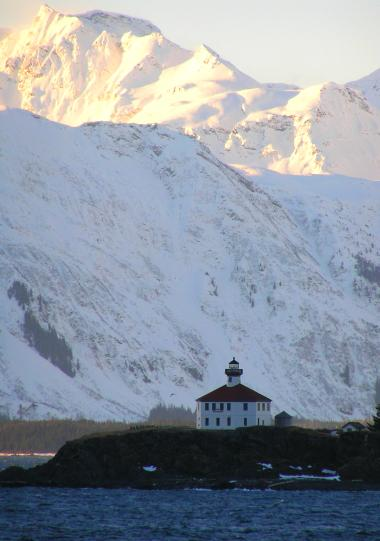
Lighthouse on Eldred Rock

- Eagle Bay Island
- Eagle Island
- Eagle Rock
- Eaglek Island
- Eaglet Rocks
- East Amatuli Island
- East Brother Island
- East Channel Island
- East Chugach Island
- East Clump
- East Flank Island
- East Francis Rock
- East Island
- East Redcliff Island
- East Rock
- East San Lorenzo Island
- East Sentinel Island
- Easterly Island
- Echo Island
- Eddy Island
- Edith Island
- Edward Islands
- Edwards Island
- Eek Island
- Egg Island
- Egg Islands
- Egil Island
- Eider Duck Island
- Eider Island
- Eider Rock
- Eightmile Island
- El Capitan Island
- El Lobo
- Eldred Rock
- Eleanor Island
- Elephant Rock
- Elf Island
- Elghi Island
- Elizabeth Island
- Elkhorn Island
- Elkugu Island
- Elliott Island
- Elma Island
- Elovoi Island
- Elrington Island
- Elsie Island
- Emerald Island
- Emgeten Island
- Emily Island
- Emmet Island
- Emmons Island
- Emperor Island
- Entrance Island
- Entrance Islet
- Epsilon Rock
- Ermine Island
- Error Island
- Escurial Island
- Eskimo Islands
- Esquibel Island
- Esther Island
- Esther Rock
- Etolin Island
- Eva Island
- Eva Islands
- Evans Island
- Ewan Island
- Exchange Island
- Expedition Island
- Explorer Island

== F ==
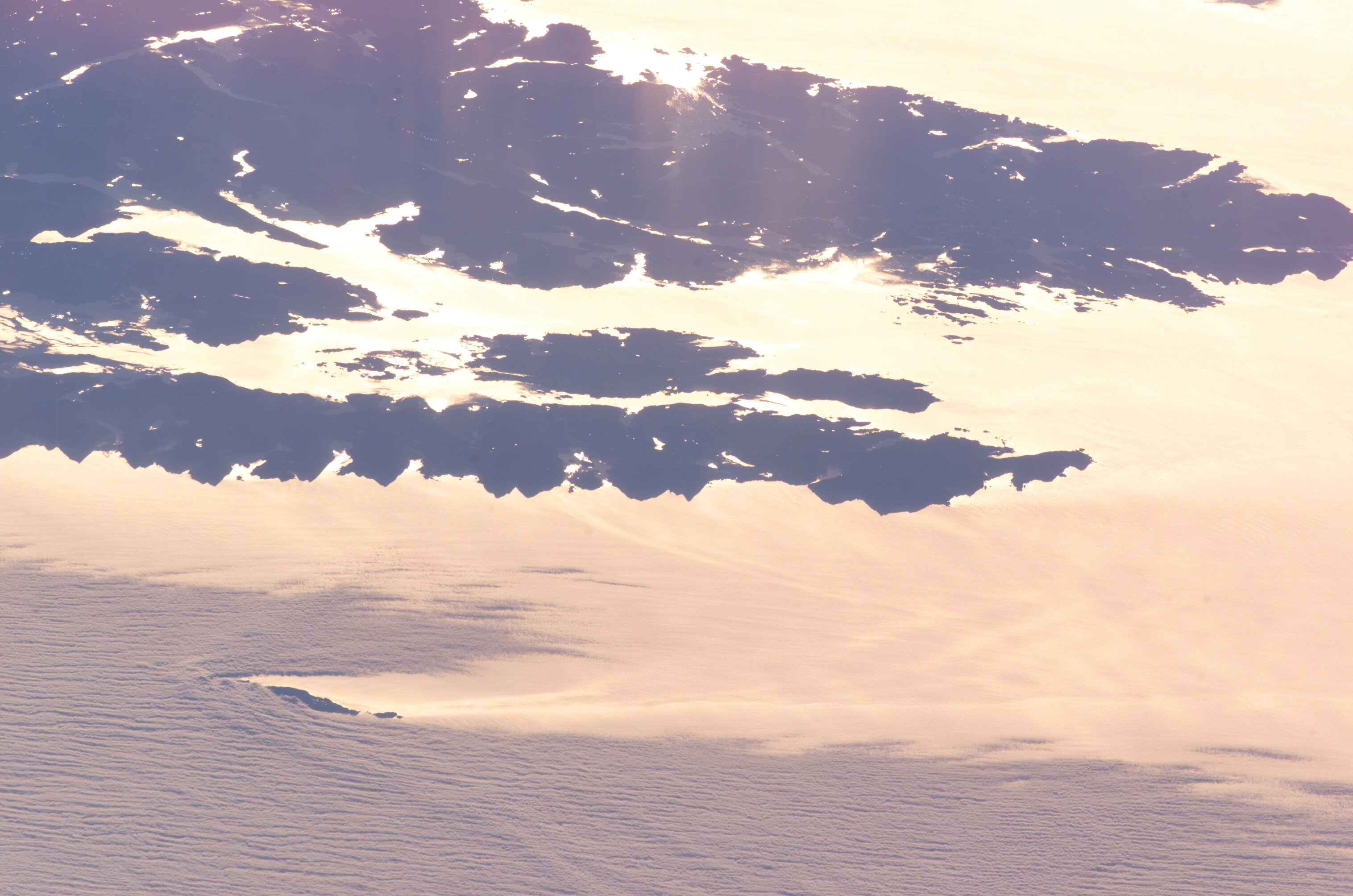
Dall Island from space, with Forrester Island in the foreground left

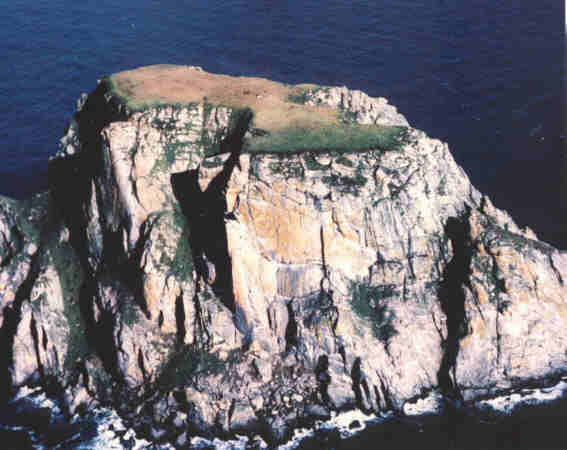
Fairway Rock

- Fair Island
- Fairmount Island
- Fairs Island
- Fairway Island
- Fairway Rock
- False Island
- Fankuda Islet
- Fannie Island
- Farm Island
- Fassett Island
- Faust Island
- Favorita Island
- Fawn Island
- Feather Rock
- Fenimore Rock
- Fifteenmile Island
- Fillmore Island
- Finger Islands
- Finneys Island
- Fire Island (Aleutian Islands)
- Fire Island (Anchorage, Alaska)
- Fire Island (Kashevarof Passage)
- First Kekur
- Fish Creek Island
- Fish Egg Island
- Fish Island
- Fish Islands
- Fish Rock
- Fishhook Island
- Fitz Island
- Fitzgerald Island
- Fivemile Island
- Flapjack Island
- Flat Island
- Flat Islands
- Flat Lakes Island
- Flat Top Rock
- Flaxman Island
- Fleece Rock
- Fleming Island
- Flemming Island
- Flora Island
- Florence Island
- Florence Islands
- Flotilla Island
- Flotsam Island
- Foggy Island
- Fontaine Island
- Fool Island
- Foot Island
- Foremost Rock
- Forrester Island
- Forss Island
- Fort Islet
- Found Island
- Fourth of July Island
- Fowler Island
- Fox Island
- Fox Islands
- Fox Point Island
- Fox Rock
- Fragrant Island
- Francis Island
- Freundly Island
- Fripo Island
- Fritz Island
- Frozen Rock
- Fruit Island
- Fruit Islands
- Fry Island
- Frying Pan Island

== G ==
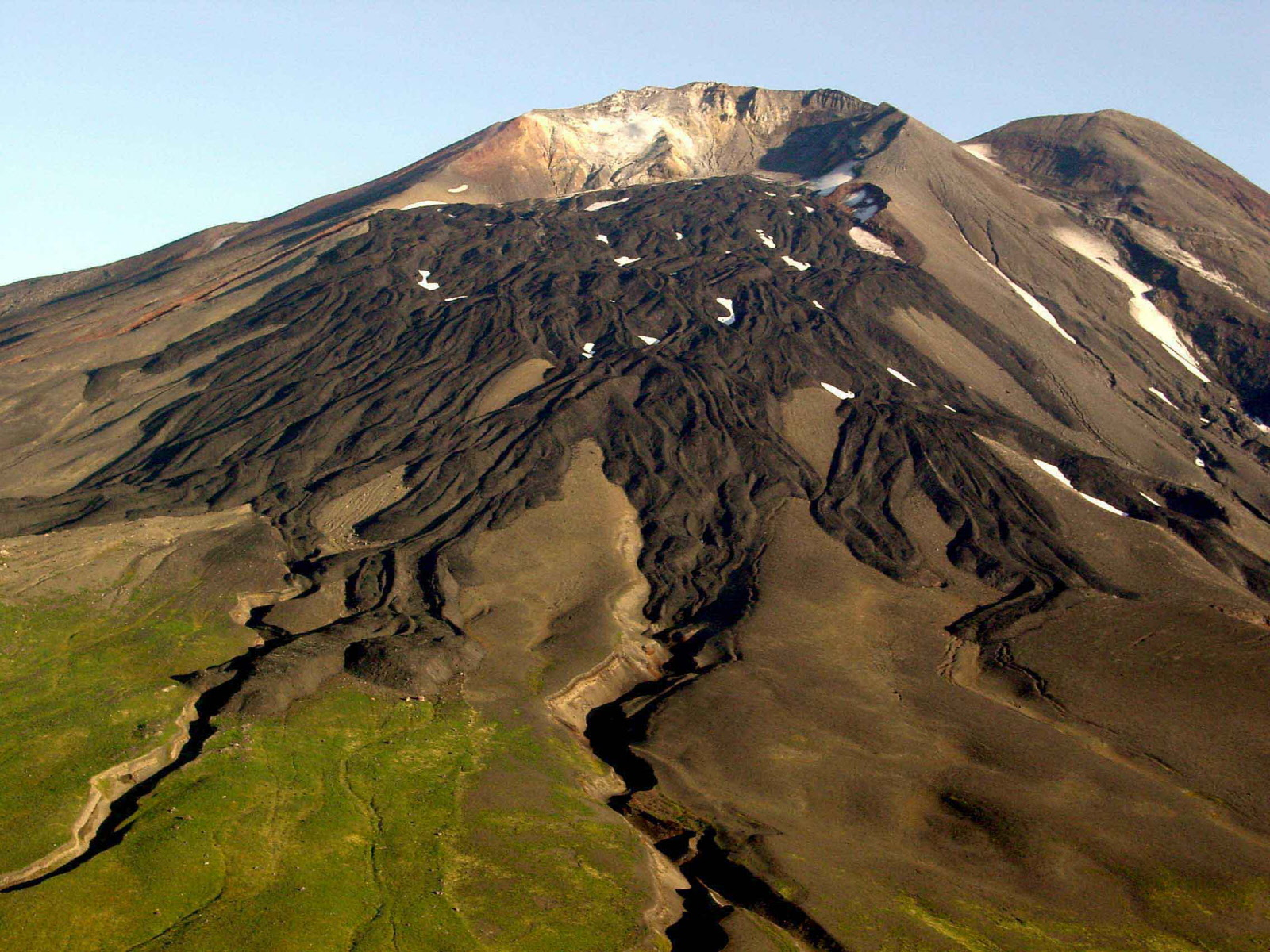
South flank of volcano, Gareloi Island

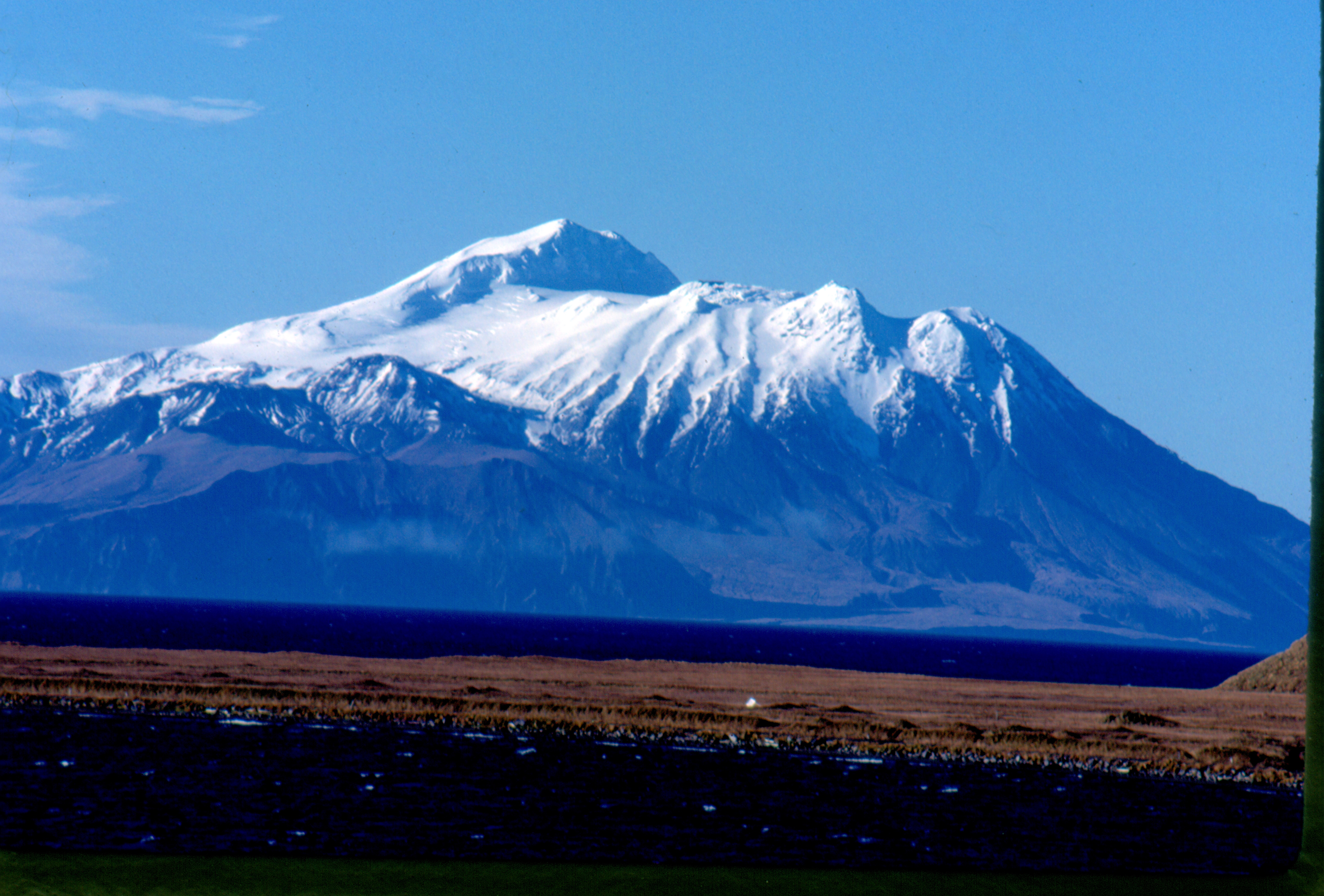
Great Sitkin Island from the shore of Adak Island

- Gaff Rock
- Gagarin Island
- Gage Island
- Gain Island
- Galankin Island
- Galankin Islands
- Galkin Island
- Gambier Island
- Gannet Island
- Gannet Rocks
- Gaohi Islands
- Garcia Island
- Garden Island
- Gareloi Island
- Garforth Island
- Gargoyle Islands
- Garita Rock
- Garnet Island
- Gas Rock
- Gate Island
- Gateway Knob
- Gauge Island
- Gauntlet Island
- Gavanski Islands
- Gaviota Islets
- Gaviota Rock
- Gedney Island
- Geese Islands
- Geikie Rock
- Gemodedon Island
- George Island
- George Islands
- Ggis Uq'e T'el'ihi
- Ghost Rocks
- Gibbs Rock
- Gibson Island
- Gibson Islands
- Gillmore Islands
- Gixsxagix
- Glacier Island
- Glagolm Island
- Glen Island
- Goat Island
- Gold Island
- Golf Island
- Goloi Island
- Goloi Islands
- Golovni Island
- Good Island
- Goose Island
- Goose Rock
- Goose Tongue Island
- Gornoi Island
- Gosling Island
- Gosti Island
- Gould Island
- Gourd Island
- Grace Island
- Gramp Rock
- Grand Island
- Granite Island
- Granite Islands
- Grant Island
- Grass Island
- Grass Peak
- Grass Rock
- Grasstop Rock
- Grassy Island
- Grassy Rock
- Grave Island
- Graveyard Island
- Gravina Island
- Gravina Islands
- Gray Rock
- Great Paimiut Island
- Great Sitkin Island
- Green Island
- Green Rocks
- Greentop Island
- Gregson Island
- Greys Island
- Grief Island
- Griffith Island
- Grindall Island
- Grouse Rock
- Guard Islands
- Guertin Island
- Guibert Islets
- Guide Island
- Guillemot Island
- Gull Island
- Gull Islands
- Gull Islet
- Gull Rock
- Gunboat Island
- Gunboat Rock

== H ==
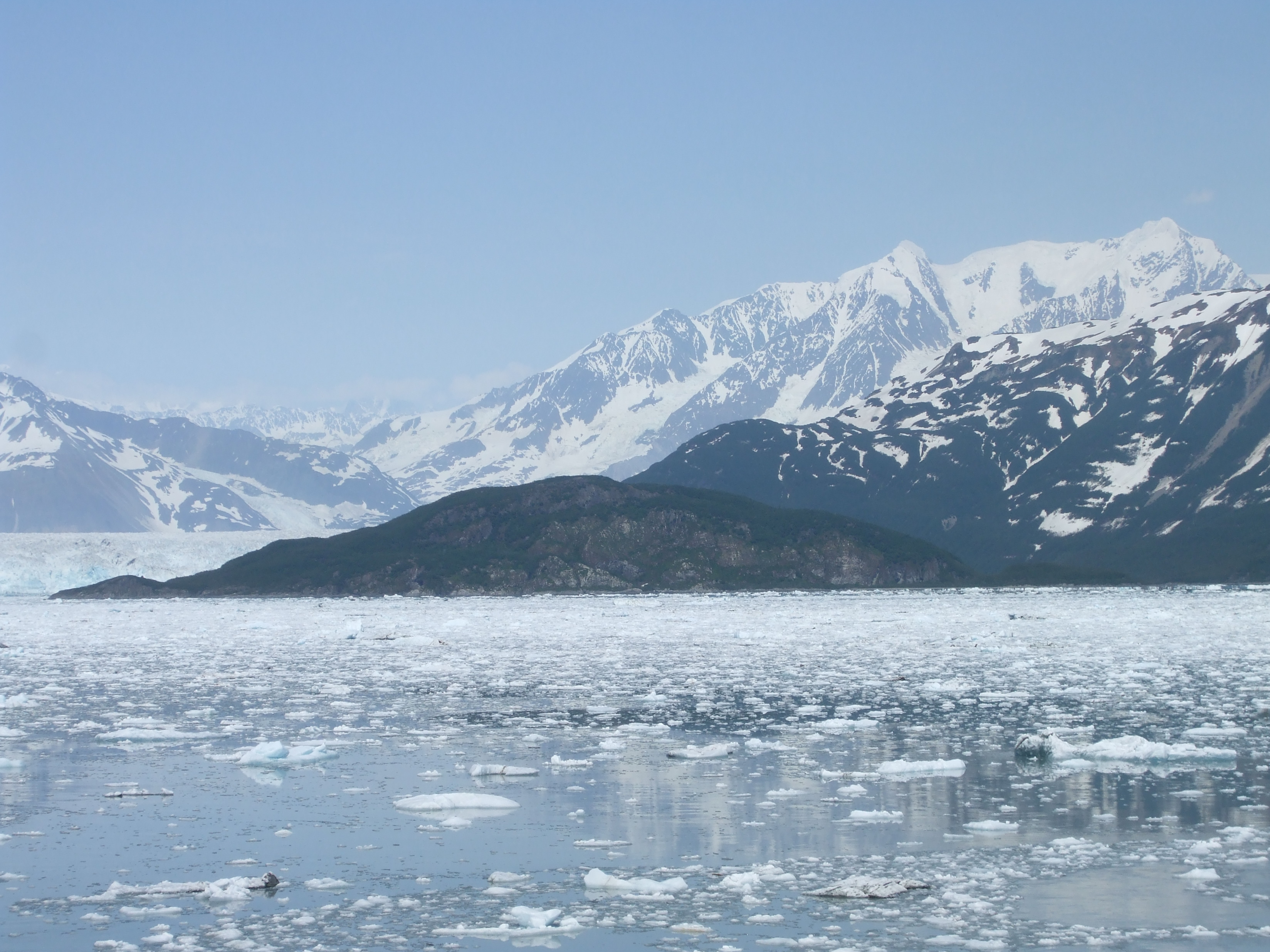
Haenke Island

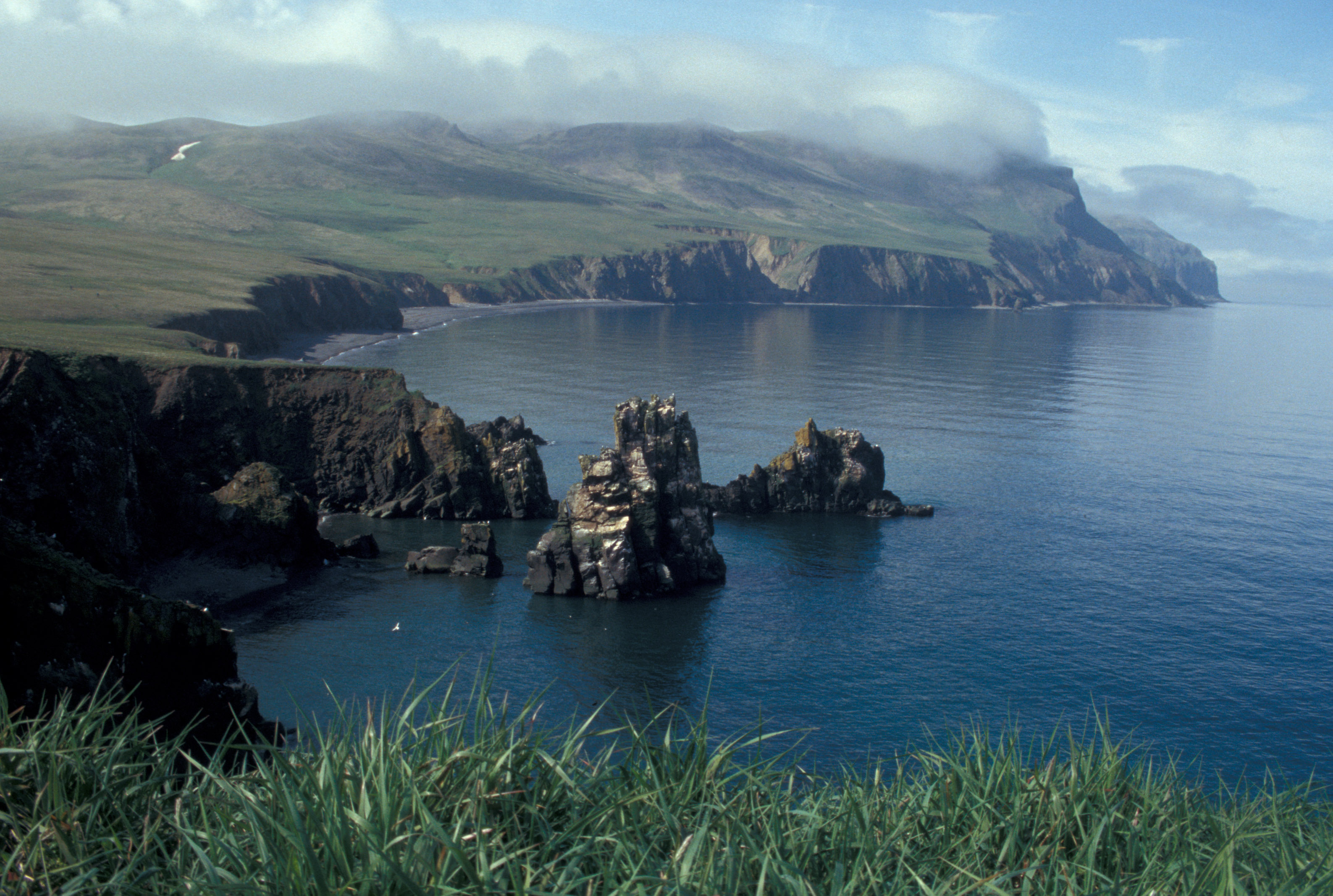
Hall Island

- Haadgux
- Hacha Island
- Hadas
- Hadgiilux
- Hadley Island
- Haenke Island
- Hagemeister Island
- Hague Rock
- Haines Island
- Haines Islands
- Haley Rocks
- Halfway Island
- Halfway Rock
- Halibut Island
- Hall Island
- Halleck Island
- Ham Island
- Ham Islands
- Hamilton Island
- Hammerhead Island
- Hanin Rock
- Hanks Island
- Hanus Islet
- Harbor Island
- Hardluck Island
- Hare Island
- Harem Rock
- Harmony Islands
- Harrell Island
- Harris Island
- Harry Island
- Hartman Island
- Hartnet Island
- Harvester Island
- Hassler Island
- Hat Island
- Hauti Island
- Hawadax Island
- Hawkins Island
- Hay Island
- Haycock Rock
- Haystack
- Haystack Rock
- Hazy Islands
- Heart Island
- Heather Island
- Heceta Island
- Heidi Rock
- Helen Island
- Hemlock Island
- Hen Island
- Henderson Island
- Hendida Island
- Henry Island
- Henry Martin Island
- Herbert Graves Island
- Herbert Island
- Herendeen Island
- Hermagos Islands
- Hermanos Islands
- Herring Islands
- Hesketh Island
- Hessa Island
- Hidden Island
- High Castle Island
- High Island
- High Rock
- Highwater Island
- Higidgim Ungluu
- Hill Island
- Hills Island
- Hinchinbrook Island
- Hitxachagux
- Hive Island
- Hive Rock
- Hmatax
- Hodikof Island
- Hog Island (North Channel)
- Hog Island (Ottawa River)
- Hogan Island
- Hogg Island
- Hoggatt Island
- Holiday Island
- Homebrew Island
- Hoonah Island
- Hoot Island
- Hoppe Island
- Horse Island
- Horseshoe Island
- Hotspur Island
- Hound Island
- House Rock
- Howe Island
- Hub Rock
- Huddle Rocks
- Huggins Island
- Hume Island
- Hump Island
- Humpback Rock
- Hunt Island
- Hunter Island
- Hunter Island Breakers
- Hydra Island

== I ==
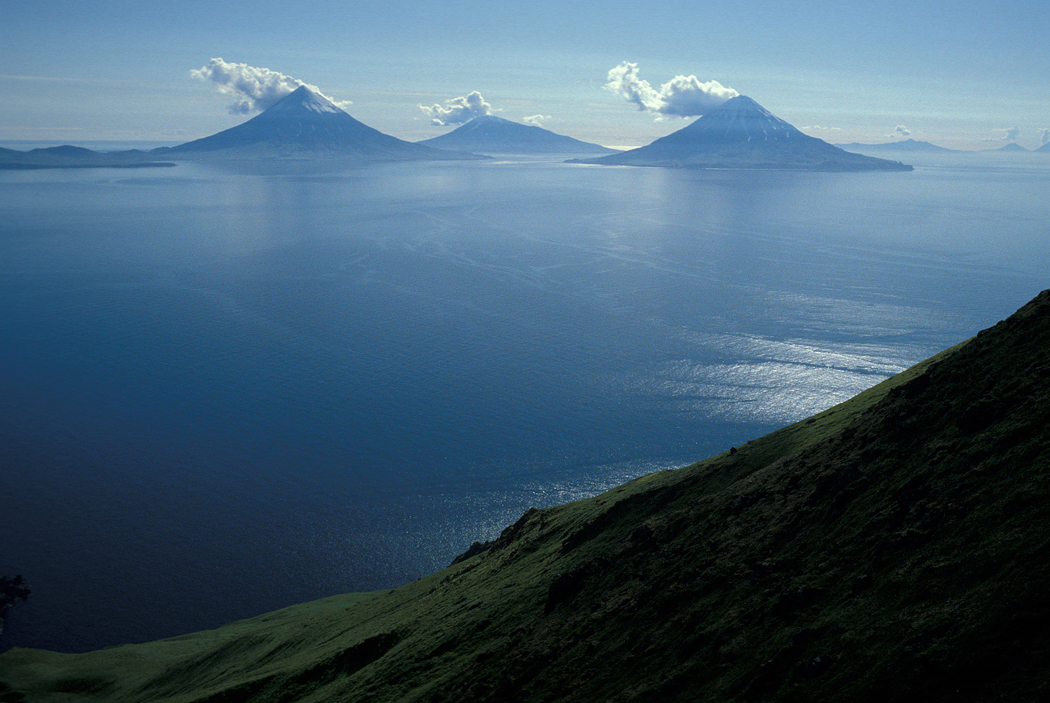
Islands of Four Mountains

- Igalik Island
- Igitkin Island
- Igluqatus
- Iilas
- Ikazagan Tanasuu
- Ikiginak Island
- Ilak Island
- Illuitkuk Islands (historical)
- Ilput Island
- Impassible Island
- Imuqudaagis
- Ina Island
- Inalak
- Independence Island
- Indiada Island
- Indian Island
- Indian Rock
- Ingenstrem Rocks
- Inglum Hasaa
- Ingot Island
- Inian Island
- Inian Islands
- Inikla Island
- Iniskin Island
- Inner Humpback Rock
- Inner Iliasik Island
- Inner Rocks
- Inner Seal Rock
- Inner Signal
- Isanotski Islands
- Isla Buen Ayre
- Isla de Santa Inez
- Isla Estuanto
- Isla Fernando Daioz
- Isla Labastida
- Isla Mendana
- Isla Monterde
- Isla Ordonez
- Island Group
- Island Rock
- Islands of Four Mountains
- Islas de Canizares
- Islas de Langara
- Islas de Lascano
- Islas de los Pilotos
- Islas San Antonio
- Isleta
- Ismailof Island
- Isthmus Island
- Ivan Island
- Ixsaxsxin
- Izmaylov Island

== J ==
- Jacknife Islands
- Jackpot Island
- Jackrabbit Island
- Jackson Island
- Jacob Island
- Jacob Rock
- James Island
- Japonski Island
- Jarvis Island
- Jeanette Island
- Jennie M Island
- Jenny Island
- Jenny Islands
- Jewell Island
- Jimmy Island
- Joe Devlin Island
- Joe Guay Island
- Joe Island
- Joe Mace Island
- John Island
- John Rock
- Johnson Island
- Jokinaugh Island
- Joly Island
- Jones Islands
- Jude Island
- Jug Island
- Jumbo Island
- Junction Island
- Juneau Island
- Just Island
- Jute Island
- Jute Islands

== K ==
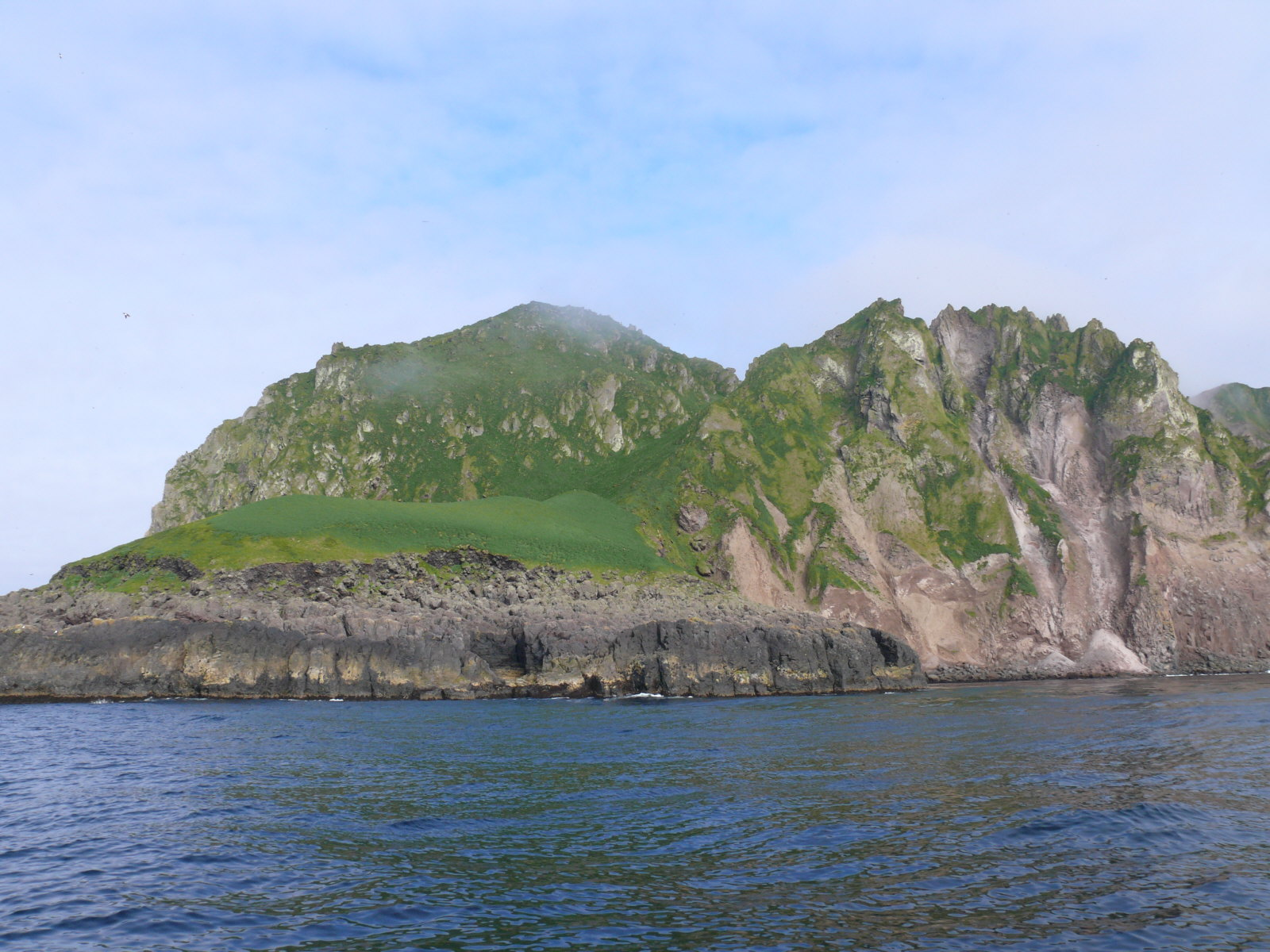
Kaniuji Island

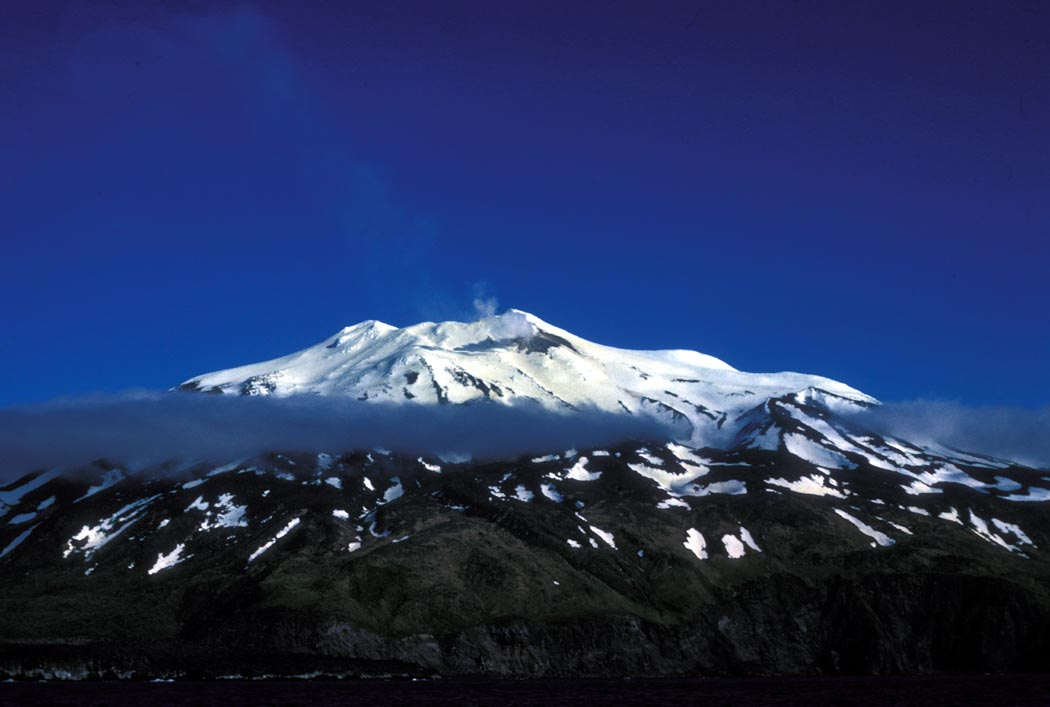
Kiska Island volcano

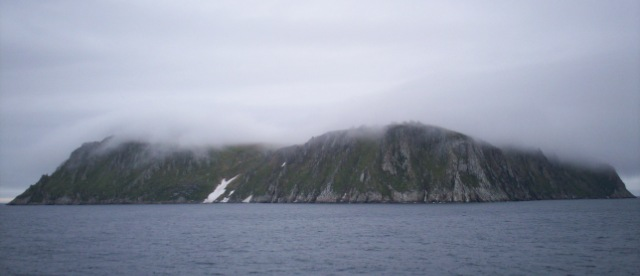
King Island

- K'chan Uq'e T'el'ihi
- K'tl'ila T'el'iht
- K'tsel Uq'e T'el'ihi
- Kadin Island
- Kagai Island
- Kagalaska Island
- Kagalusum Hachan Tanangis
- Kagamil Island
- Kah Sheets Island
- Kaiasik
- Kaiuchali Island
- Kak Island
- Kakovo Island
- Kaksajookalik Island
- Kalgin Island
- Kaligagan Island
- Kalka Island
- Kalsin Island
- Kaluchagun Island
- Kalulam-tatugan Hachan Tanangis
- Kamaton Island
- Kamenisti
- Kamennoi Island
- Kanaga Island
- Kanagunut Island
- Kanak Island
- Kane Islands
- Kanga Island
- Kaniliak
- Kanu Island
- Kanuuxsux
- Karluk Island
- Karpa Island
- Kasaan Island
- Kasatochi Island
- Kashevarof Islands
- Kasiana Islands
- Kassa Island
- Kassan Islands
- Kataguni Island
- Kateekuk Island
- Kathaleen Island
- Katiriinam Tanaa
- Katmai Rock
- Katz Island
- Kauatka
- Kavalga Island
- Kawokhawik Island
- Kayak Island
- Kayak Islands
- Keene Island
- Keete Island
- Keku Islands
- Keku Islets
- Kekur Island
- Kelly Rock
- Kelp Island
- Kendrick Islands
- Kennon Island
- Kennoys Islands
- Keski Island
- Kestrel Island
- Khantaak Island
- Khvostof Island
- Kidney Island
- Kigigak Island
- Kigul Island
- Kikartik Rock
- Kikegtek Island
- Kikikausgruak Island
- Kikiktak Islands
- Kikiktalik Rock
- Kikoojit Rocks
- Kiktak Island
- Kiliktagik Island
- Killisnoo Island
- Kinchman Rock
- King Island
- King Salmon Island
- Kingdaxsxa
- Kingdaxsxan
- Kings Slough Island
- Kiniklik Island
- Kinky Island
- Kinuk Island
- Kirbas Island
- Kirushkin Island
- Kishbrock Island
- Kiska Island
- Kit Island
- Kita Island
- Kitavie Rock
- Kite Island
- Kiukpalik Island
- Klag Island
- Klakas Island
- Klawock Island
- Kleiti Islands
- Kliixtax
- Klinau Island
- Kliuchevoi Island
- Klochkof Rock
- Klokachef Island
- Kluanil Island
- Knight Island
- Knob Island
- Kochu Island
- Kodiak Island
- Kohl Island
- Koka Island
- Kokinhenik Island
- Kolash Island
- Koniuji Island
- Kopkakisak Island
- Korga Island
- Korovin Island
- Kosciusko Island
- Kothlik Island
- Kousk Island
- Koyukuk Island
- Krekatok Island
- Krenitzin Islands
- Krestof Island
- Krishka Island
- Kritskoi Island
- Kriwoi Island
- Krugloi Islands
- Krutoi Island
- Kruzof Island
- Kubanof Rock
- Kudiakof Islands
- Kudobin Islands
- Kuiu Island
- Kulgurak Island
- Kulichkof Island
- Kulichkof Rock
- Kulyugayak
- Kumlik Island
- Kupreanof Island
- Kusilvak Island
- Kussu Islands
- Kutchuma Islands
- Kutkan Island
- Kuuchaxsis
- Kwigluk Island

== L ==
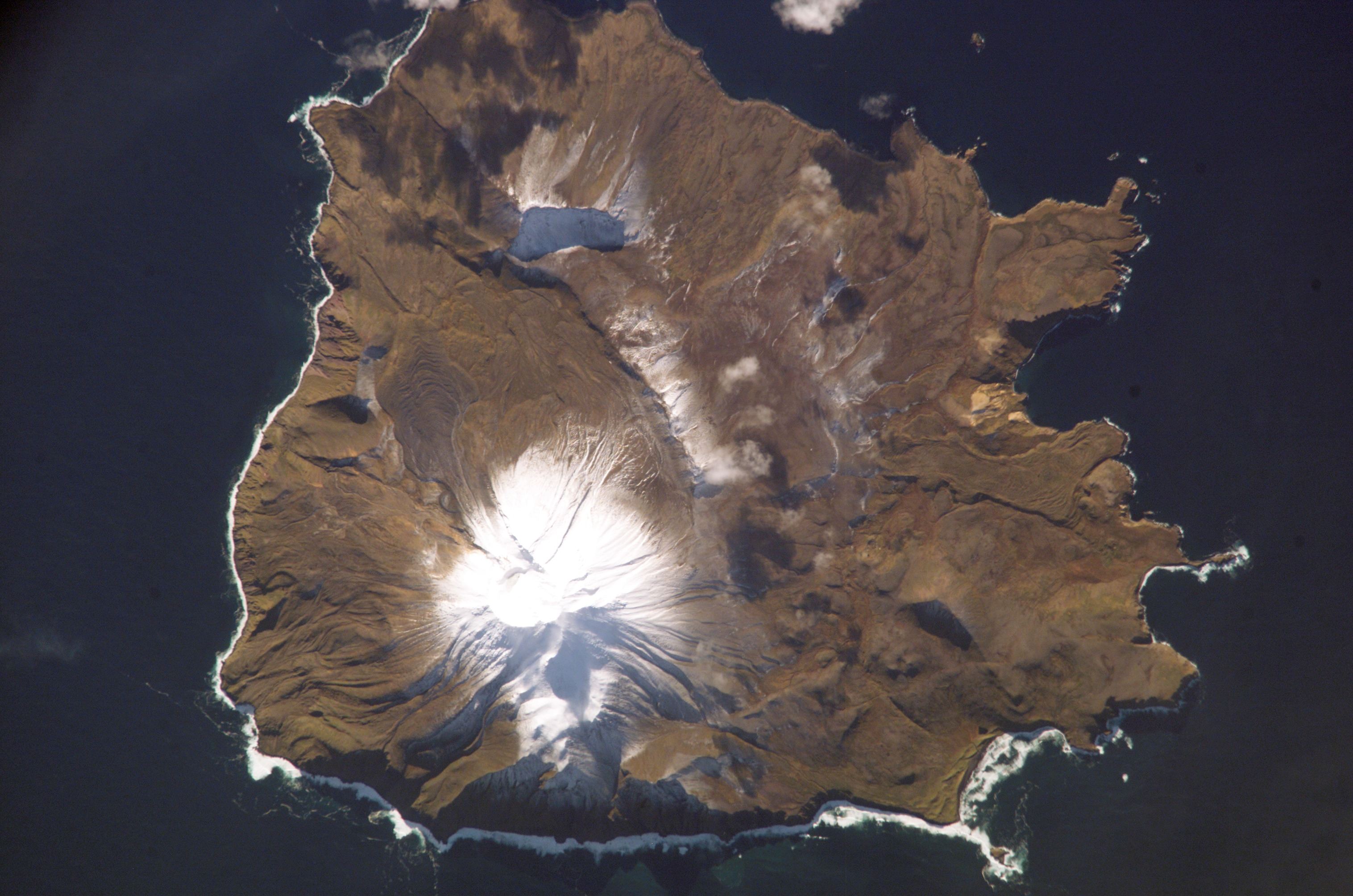
Little Sitkin Island from space

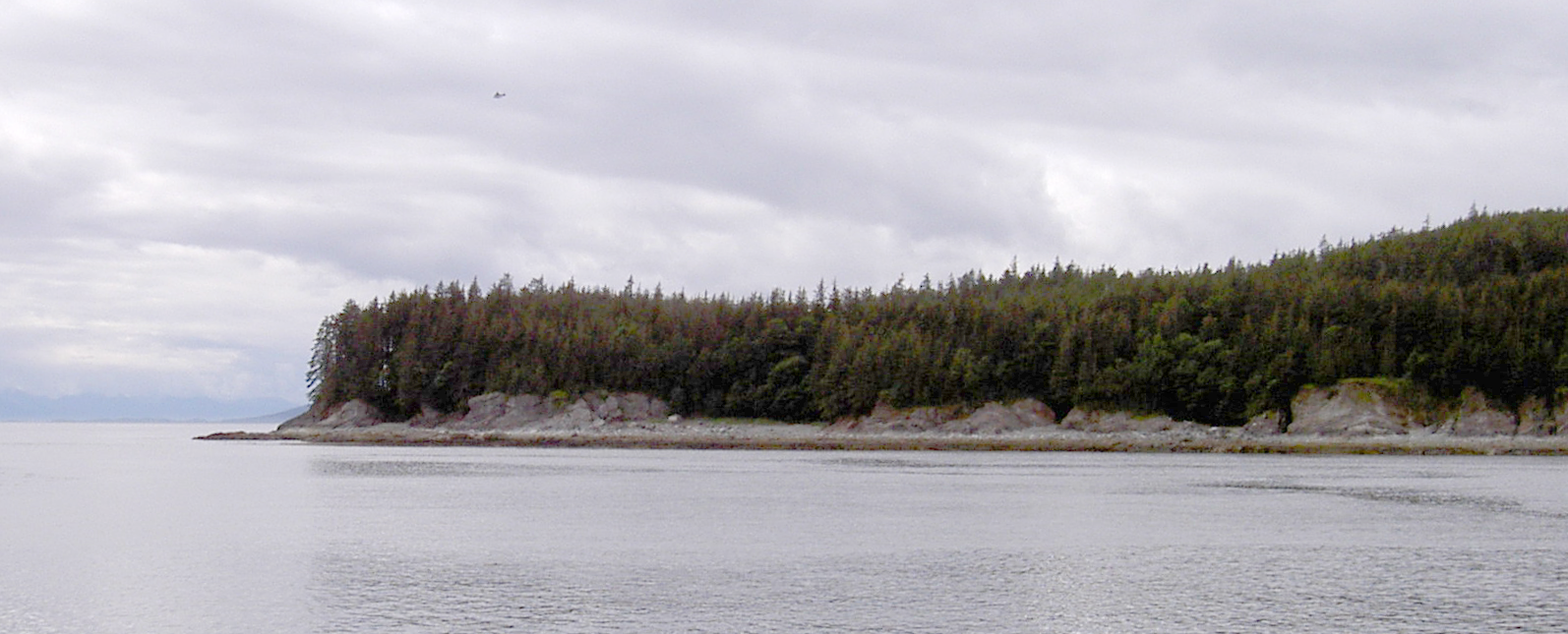
Southern tip of Lincoln Island

- La Laja
- La Ventura
- Labouchere Island
- Lacey Island
- Ladder Island
- Ladrones Islands
- Lady Island
- Lagoon Island
- Lamb Island
- Lambda Rock
- Lane Island
- Lange Island
- Large Rock
- Lark Island
- Lars Island
- Larsen Island
- Larzatita Island
- Las Puercas
- Latouche Island
- Lauf Islands
- Lava Island
- Leader Island
- Leavitt Island
- Ledge Island
- Legma Island
- Lehunua Island
- Leland Islands
- Lemesurier Island
- Leo Island
- Leonard Island
- Lester Island
- Let Island
- Level Islands
- Lewis Island
- Libby Island
- Lida Island
- Liesnoi Island
- Lighthouse Rocks
- Limb Island
- Limit Island
- Lincoln Island
- Lincoln Rock
- Line Island
- Liner Island
- Link Island
- Lion Rock
- Little Axel Lind Island
- Little Bear Rock
- Little Biorka Island
- Little Cedar Island
- Little Diomede Island
- Little Dry Island
- Little Egg Island
- Little Eightmile Island
- Little Fairmount Island
- Little Fort Island
- Little Gavanski Island
- Little Goose Island
- Little Green Island
- Little Hamilton Island
- Little Island
- Little Joker Island
- Little Kiska Island
- Little Koniuji Island
- Little Level Island
- Little Mummy Island
- Little Rapids Island
- Little Raspberry Island
- Little Rock
- Little Rose Island
- Little Saltery Island
- Little Sitkin Island
- Little Smith Island
- Little Tanaga Island
- Little Wrangell Island
- Lively Islands
- Loaf Island
- Lock Island
- Lodge Island
- Lone Island
- Lone Rock
- Lone Tree Island
- Lone Tree Islet
- Long Island
- Loon Island
- Loper Island
- Lord Islands
- Lord Rock
- Losa Island
- Lotus Island
- Love Island
- Low Island
- Lowrie Island
- Loy Island
- Lucas Island
- Luce Island
- Lulu Island
- Lump Island
- Lung Island
- Lydonia Island
- Lynn Brothers
- Lynn Sisters

== M ==
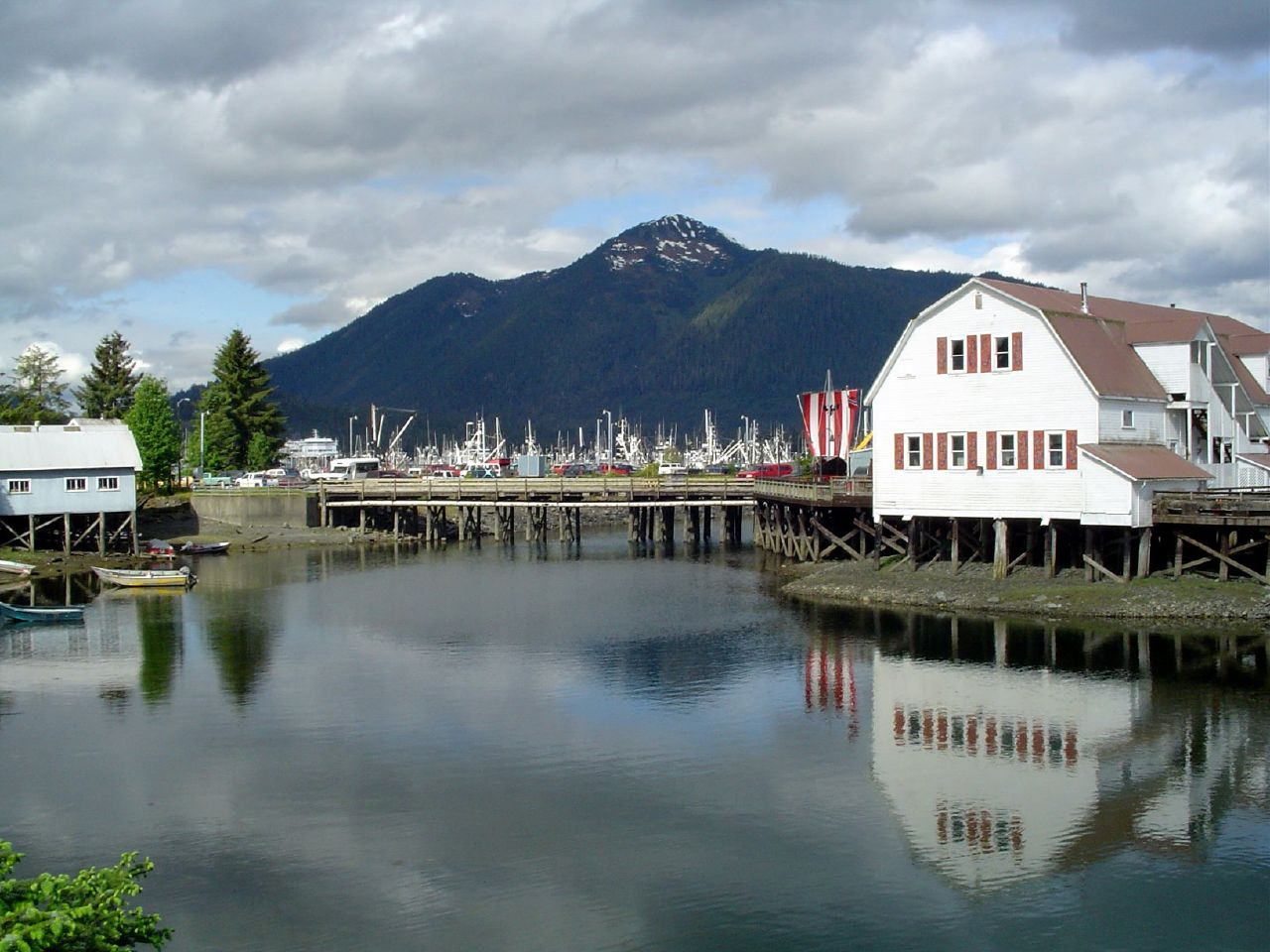
Petersburg, Alaska on Mitkof Island

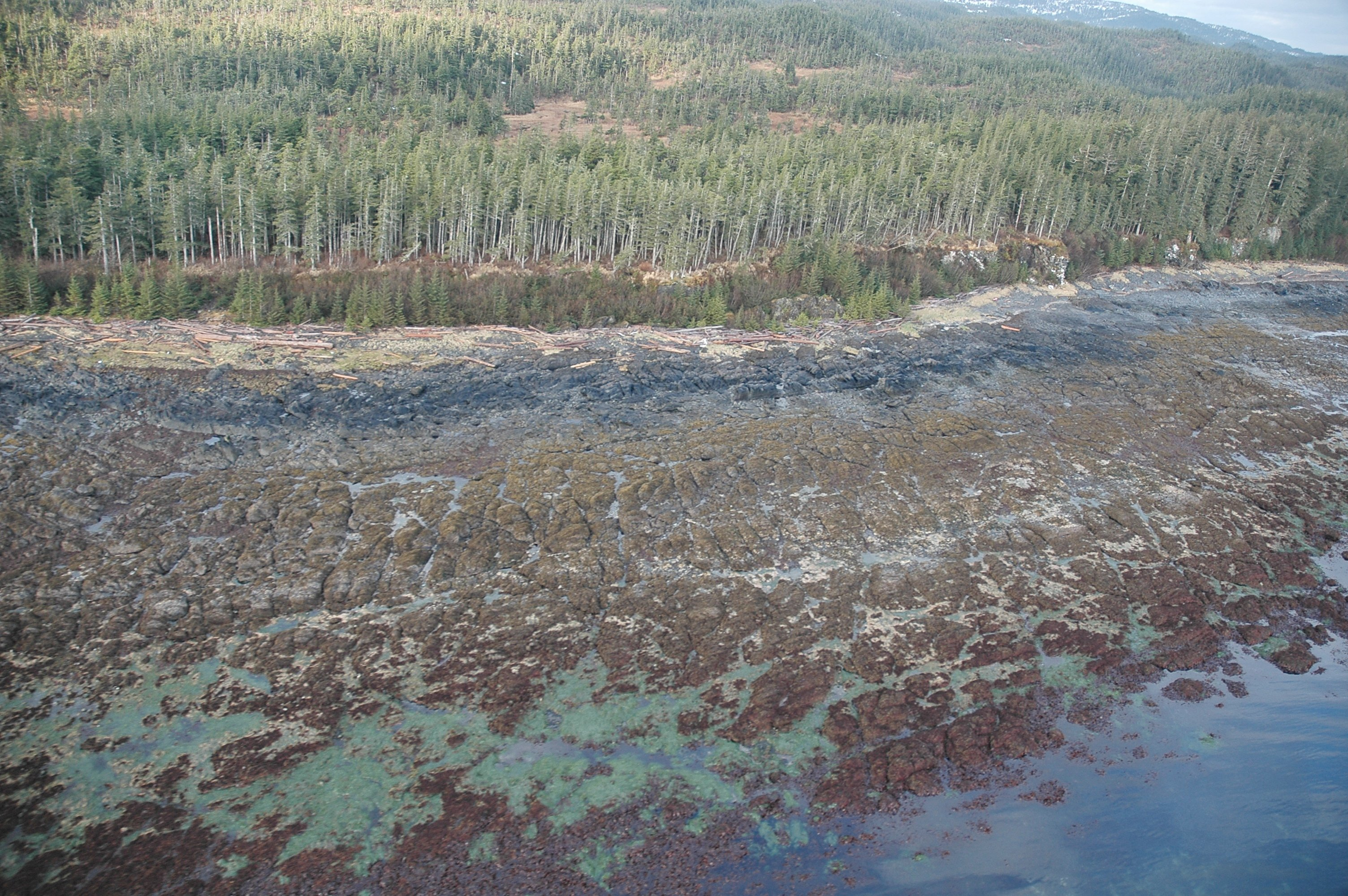
Montague Island coastline

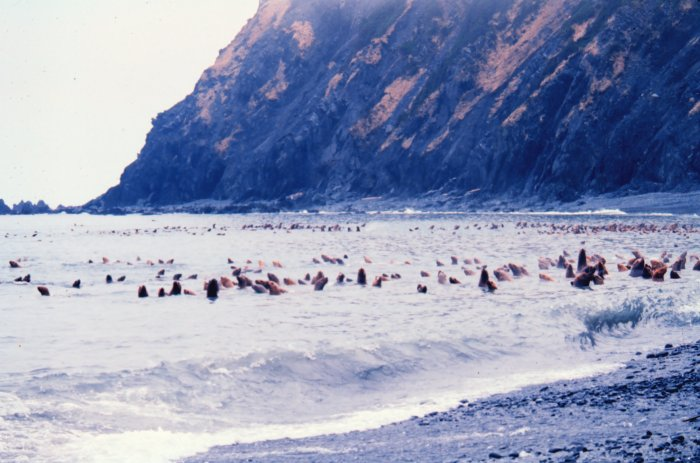
A raft of Steller sea lions off Middleton Island

- Mab Island
- Mabel Island
- Macks Head Island
- Madre de Dios Island
- Magnet Rock
- Magnetic Island
- Magoun Islands
- Maguire Islands
- Maid Island
- Makhnati Island
- Makhnati Islands
- Malas Hasaa
- Mandarin Rock
- Manzanita Island
- Marabilla Island
- Marble Island
- Marble Islands
- Marble Islet
- Marmion Island
- Marmot Island
- Marsh Island
- Marshall Island
- Marten Island
- Martin Island
- Martin Islands
- Mary Island
- Mary Sachs Island
- Marys Rock
- Matushka Island
- Maurelle Islands
- Mavis Island
- McClellan Group
- McClellan Rock
- McClure Islands
- McCulloch Rock
- McDonald Islands
- McFarland Islands
- McHenry Islet
- McKenzie Rock
- McNeil Islet
- Meadow Island
- Mean Rock
- Meares Island
- Megotsol Island
- Mellen Rock
- Melozi Island
- Menefee Islands
- Meridian Island
- Mermaid Island
- Mertz Island
- Mesa Rocks
- Mex Island
- Meyers Island
- Mickey Island
- Midarm Island
- Middle Island
- Middle Islands
- Middle Ledge
- Middle Punuk Island
- Middle Rock
- Middle Rocks
- Middleton Island
- Midun Island
- Midway Island
- Midway Islands
- Midway Rock
- Midway Rocks
- Milady Island
- Miller Island
- Mills Island
- Mindalina Island
- Miner Island
- Mineral Creek Islands
- Minett Island
- Mink Island
- Minook Island
- Minx Islands
- Misery Island
- Mission Island
- Mist Island
- Mite Island
- Mitkof Island
- Mitrofania Island
- Mogilnoi Island
- Moira Island
- Moira Rock
- Moller Island
- Molver Island
- Montague Island
- Monte Carlo Island
- Moore Island
- Moose Island
- Moosehorn Island
- Moraine Island
- Morgan Island
- Morne Island
- Moser Island
- Mosman Island
- Mosquito Islands
- Moss Island
- Muerta Island
- Muffin Islands
- Mulgrave Island
- Mummy Island
- Munson Island
- Murdo Island
- Murie Islets
- Murray Island
- Murre Rocks
- Muse Island
- Mushroom Island
- Mushroom Islands
- Myak Rock
- Myriad Islands

== N ==
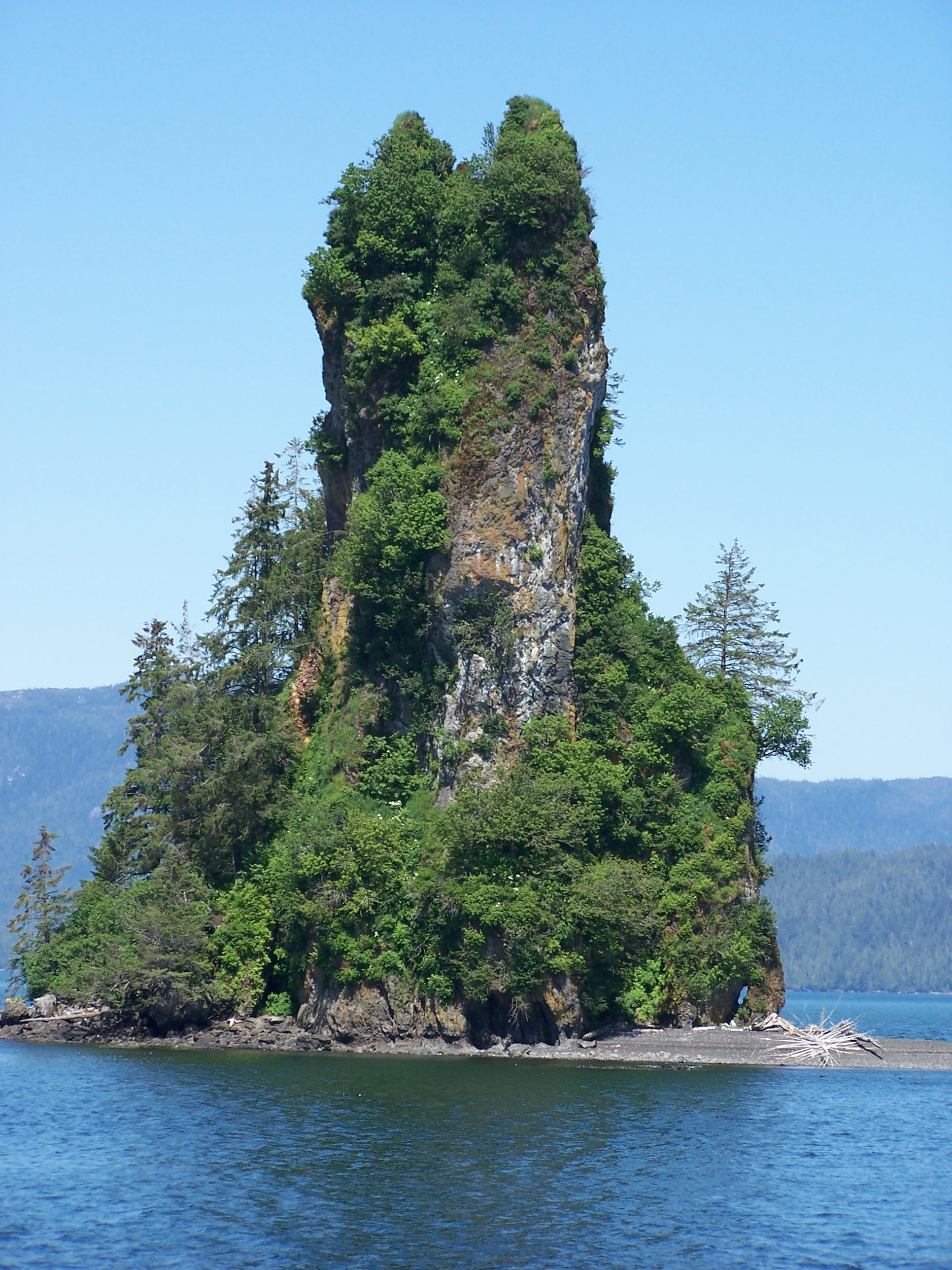
New Eddystone Rock

- Naakuvalinax
- Nabangoyak Rock
- Nachalni Island
- Nadezhda Islands
- Naerie Rock
- Nagahut Rocks
- Nagai Island
- Nakchamik Island
- Naked Island
- Nameless Island
- Narwhal Island
- Natalia Island
- Natoa Island
- Navy Island
- Neakok Island
- Near Island
- Near Islands
- Necker Islands
- Needle Island
- Needle Rock
- Neeg Island
- Neka Island
- Nellag Island
- Nelson Island
- Nepovorotni Rocks
- Neptune Island
- Neragon Island
- Nest Island
- Nest Rock
- Netland Island
- Neumann Island
- Neva Island
- Nevensky Island
- Nevski Island
- New Eddystone Islands
- New Eddystone Rock
- New Trinity Island
- New Year Island
- New Year Islands
- Newport Island
- Ngam Ungluu
- Niako Island
- Niakuk Islands
- Niblack Islands
- Nichols Islands
- Ninagiak Island
- Ninemile Island
- Nizki Island
- No Name Island
- Noisy Islands
- Nokogamiut Island
- Nooku Ch'edagheedhot Noo'
- Noonaghak
- Nooravloaksmiut Island
- Nord Island
- Nordyke Island
- Nordyke Islands
- North Burnett Island
- North Fork Island
- North Island
- North Marble Island
- North Pinnacle Rock
- North Punuk Island
- North Rock
- North Rocks
- North Star Island
- Northeast Rocks
- Northerly Island
- Novakaket Island
- Noyes Island
- Nuekshat Island
- Nuka Island
- Nuka Rock
- Nukshak Island
- Nulato Island
- Nunaktuk Island
- Nunivachak Island
- Nunivak Island
- Nut Island

== O ==
- O'Neil Island
- Oarlock Island
- Obsechki Island
- Observation Island
- Observation Rock
- Ogangen Island
- Ogchul Island
- Ogliuga Island
- Oglodak Island
- Old Man Rocks
- Olga Islands
- Olga Rock
- Olor Island
- Olsen Island
- Omega Island
- Onetree Rock
- Onslow Island
- Operl Island
- Oronikowaktalik Rock
- Orr Island
- Oscar Island
- Osier Island
- Osten Island
- Otmeloi Island
- Otstoia Island
- Otter Island
- Outer
- Outer Iliasik Island
- Outer Island
- Outer Rock
- Outer Seal Rock
- Outer Signal
- Outpost Island
- Oval Rock
- Owl Island
- Oyle Island

== P ==
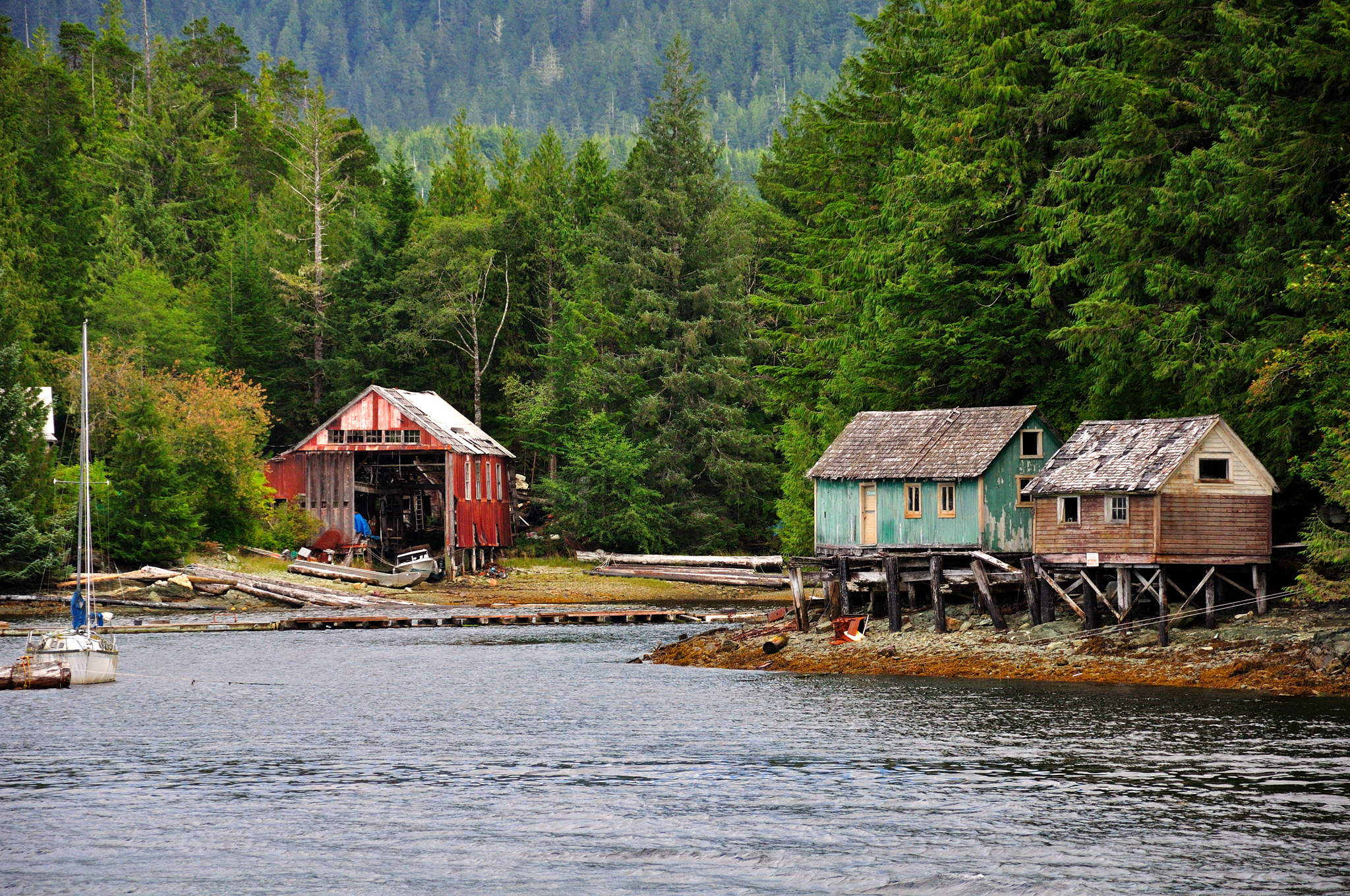
Pennock Island

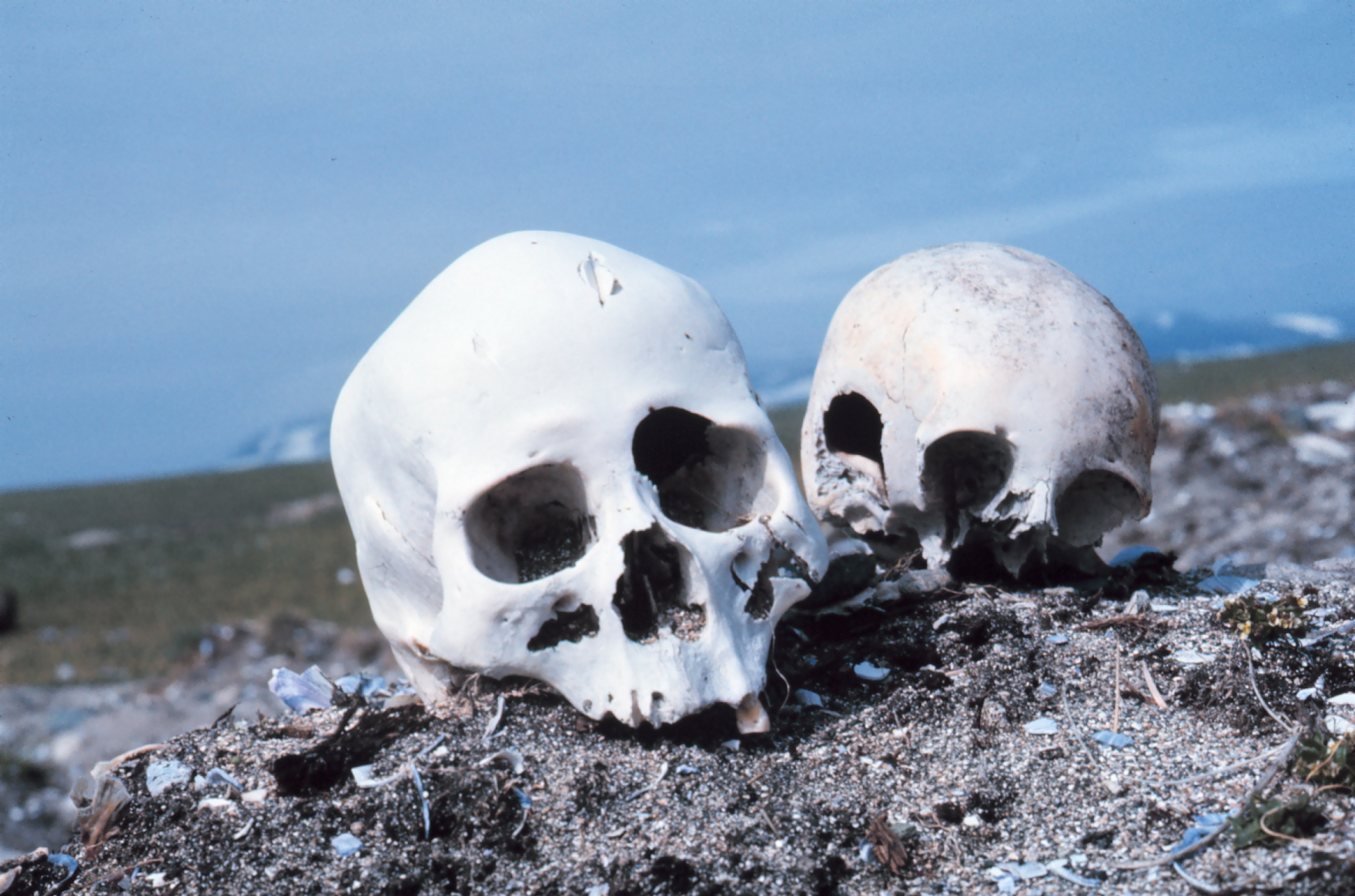
Skulls washed up on the Punuk Islands

- Pad Island
- Paimiut Island
- Palisade Island
- Palmtree Islands
- Pancake Rock
- Panhandle Island
- Parida Island
- Parker Group
- Parrot Island
- Parrot Rock
- Partofshikof Island
- Pass Island
- Passage Island
- Passage Islands
- Patterson Island
- Patton Island
- Paul Island
- Paulina Island
- Pavlof Islands
- Payne Island
- Peace Island
- Peacock Island
- Peak Island
- Peaked Island
- Pearl Island
- Peat Falls Island
- Pedersen Island
- Peer Island
- Peisar Island
- Pen Island
- Peninsula Island
- Pennock Island
- Peratrovich Island
- Perch Rock
- Percy Islands
- Perevalnie Islands
- Perl Island
- Perl Rock
- Perry Island
- Pesquera Island
- Peter Island
- Petersen Islands
- Peterson Island
- Petrel Island
- Phillips Rock
- Piedras Island
- Pieneluk Island
- Pigeon Island
- Piledriver Rock
- Pillar Rock
- Pillbox Rock
- Pilot Rock
- Pin Rock
- Pine Island
- Pingok Island
- Pingolee Island
- Pingurbek Island
- Pinnacle Island
- Pinnacle Rock
- Pinusuk Island
- Piper Island
- Pishak Island
- Pit Rock
- Pitt Island
- Pleasant Island
- Pleasure Island
- Pleiades Islands
- Plover Islands
- Plum Island
- Plum Island Rocks
- Pluma Island
- Poa Island
- Pocket Island
- Poe Island
- Point Lockwood Rock
- Point Swift Rock
- Pointed Island
- Pointed Rock
- Pole Island
- Polivnoi Rock
- Polk Island
- Polly Island
- Poltava Island
- Pomeroy Island
- Pond Island
- Poperechnoi Island
- Popof Island
- Porcupine Island
- Porcupine Islands
- Porpoise Islands
- Porpoise Rocks
- Port Island
- Portage Islands
- Portland Island
- Post Island
- Povorotni Island
- Pow Island
- Powder Island
- Pribilof Islands
- Price Island
- Priest Rock
- Prince Island
- Prince of Wales Archipelago
- Prince of Wales Island
- Princesa Island
- Princess Rock
- Pritchard Rock
- Procession Rocks
- Profit Island
- Prokoda Island
- Prolewy Rock
- Prolewy Rocks
- Prominent Rock
- Ptarmigan Island
- Puffin Island
- Pulizzi Island
- Pulpit Rocks
- Punuk Islands
- Pup Island
- Pustoi Island
- Pye Islands
- Pyramid Island

== Q ==
- Qa'itsusi
- Qaangugiidax
- Qagdugix
- Qagudas
- Qalgizax
- Qalnigi Denuch'dnel'usht
- Qalnigi T'el'iht
- Qatxayagum-tanasuu
- Qigayax
- Qiixtas
- Quail Island
- Quartz Rock
- Qudga Hanixsxax
- Queer Island
- Qugas
- Quitasueno Rock
- Qungidgis
- Qusiixtax
- Qyanan
- Qyasxum Qalan Tanasuu

== R ==
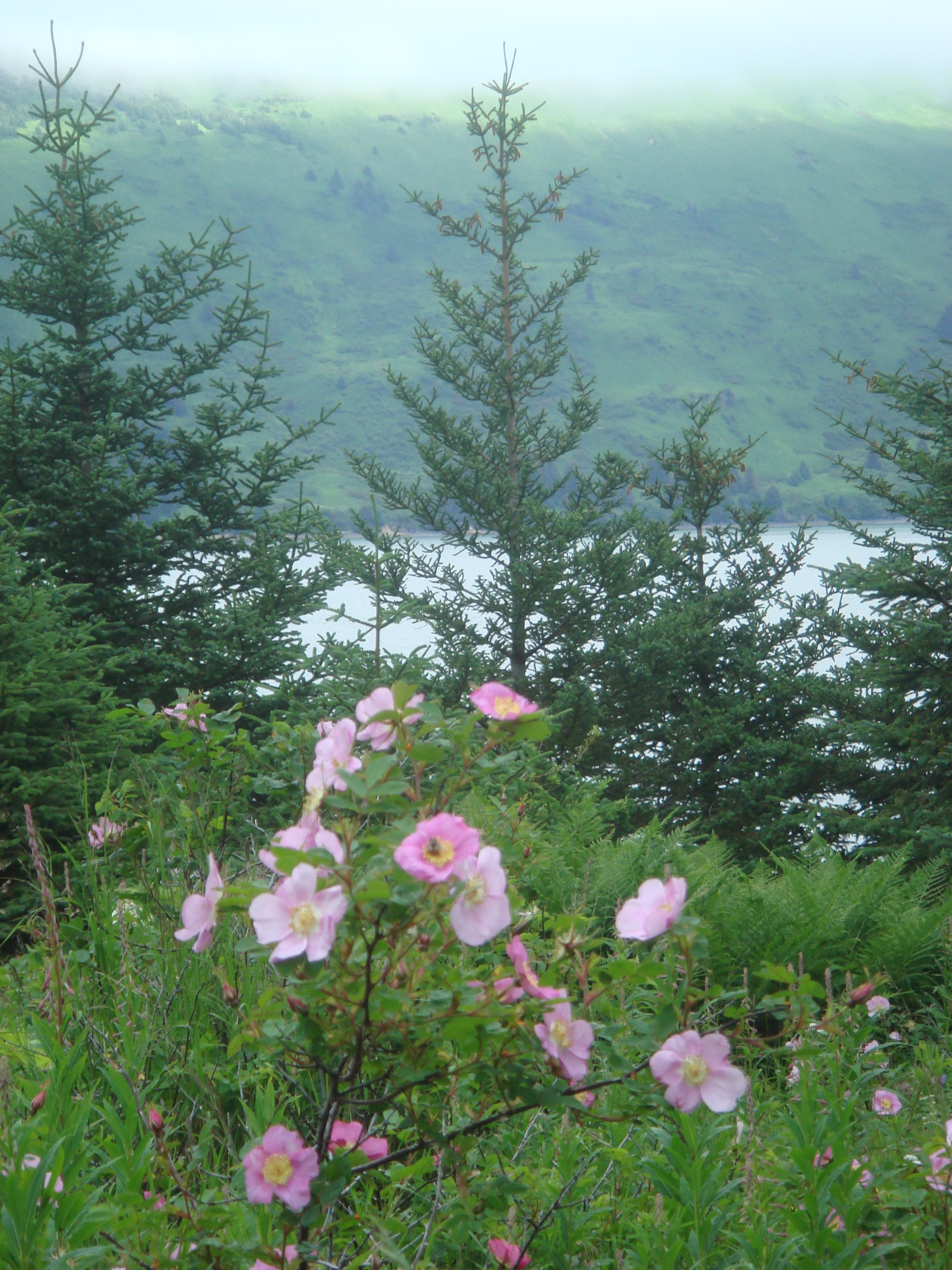
Mountain roses (Rosa woodsii) on Raspberry Island

- Rabbit Island
- Rabbit Islands
- Race Rocks
- Rachek Island
- Radial Island
- Ragged Island
- Rainier Island
- Rakof Islands
- Ralston Island
- Ramp Island
- Rancheria Island
- Range Island
- Range Islet
- Rapids Island
- Rashimosti Island
- Raso Rock
- Raspberry Island
- Rat Island
- Rat Islands
- Raven Island
- Read Island
- Red Rock
- Redcliff Islands
- Redfish Islets
- Reef Island
- Reef Islands
- Reef Rock
- Refuge Island
- Reindeer Island
- Reshimosti Island
- Return Islands
- Revillagigedo Island
- Rhea Rocks
- Ridge Island
- Ring Island
- Ringgold Island
- Rip Rock
- Road Island
- Roadstead Island
- Robert Island
- Robert Islands
- Rocas Negrillos
- Rock Island
- Rock of Ages
- Rockwell Island
- Rocky Island
- Rocky Islet
- Rodman Island
- Rogers Island
- Romp Island
- Rona Island
- Rona Islands
- Rookery Island
- Rookery Islands
- Roosevelt Island
- Rootok Island
- Rosary Island
- Rose Island
- Round Island
- Round Island (Aleutian Islands)
- Round Islands
- Round Islet
- Round Islets
- Round Rock
- Rowe Island
- Roy Island
- Rudyerd Island
- Rue Ledge
- Rugged Island
- Russell Island
- Ruth Island
- Rutland Island
- Rynda Island

== S ==
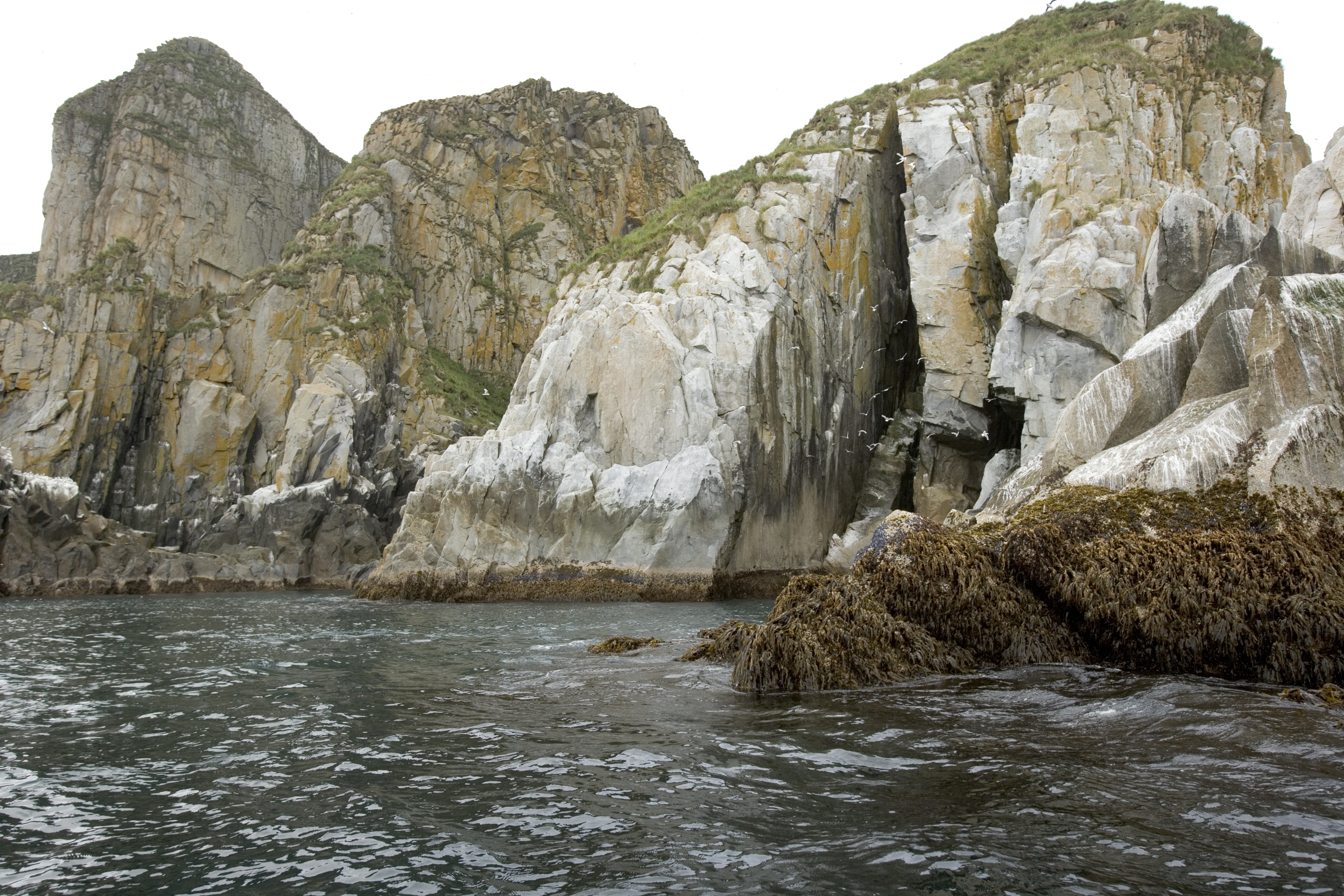
Castle Rock, Shumagin Islands

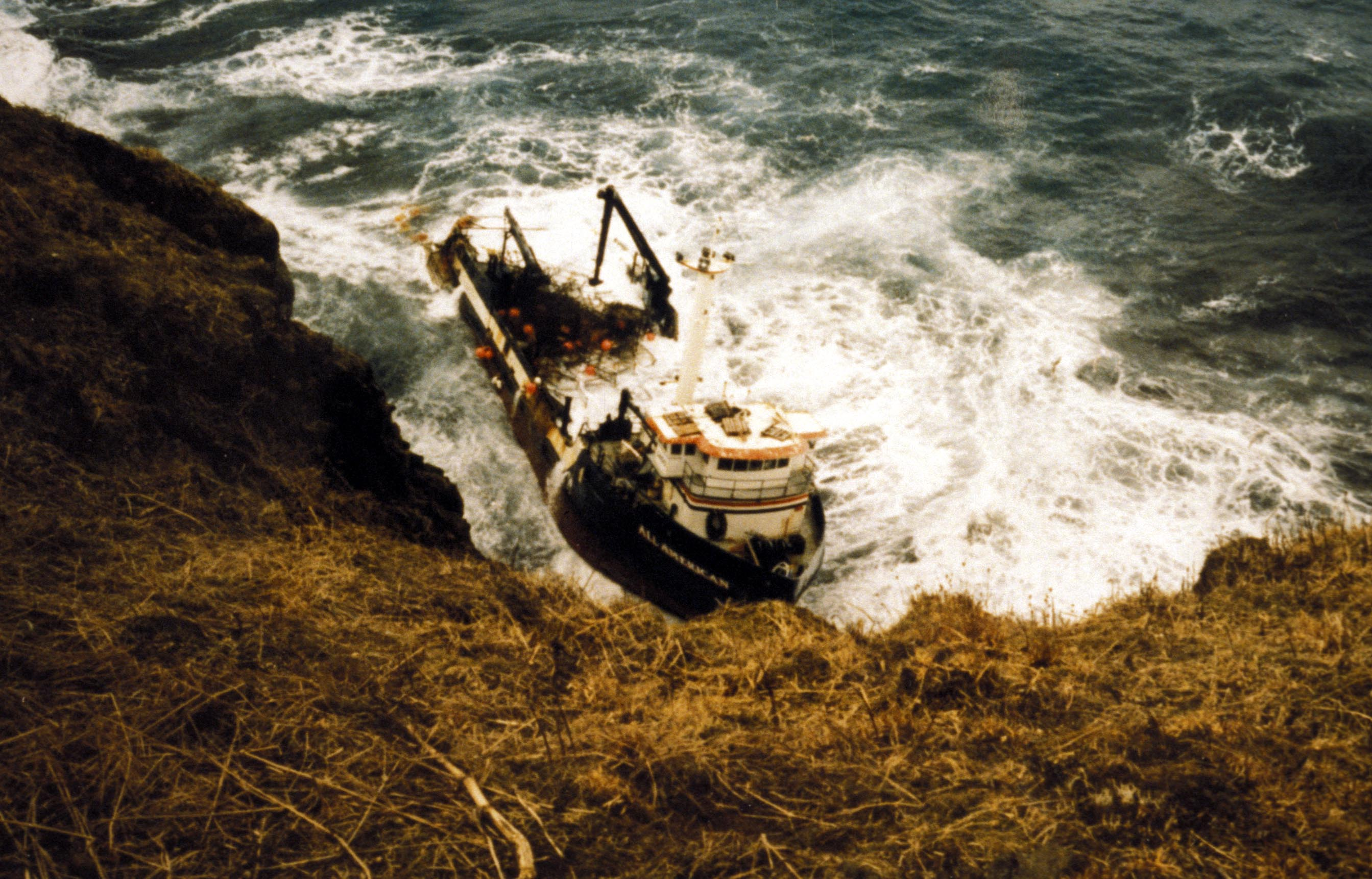
Shipwreck, St. George Island, 1996

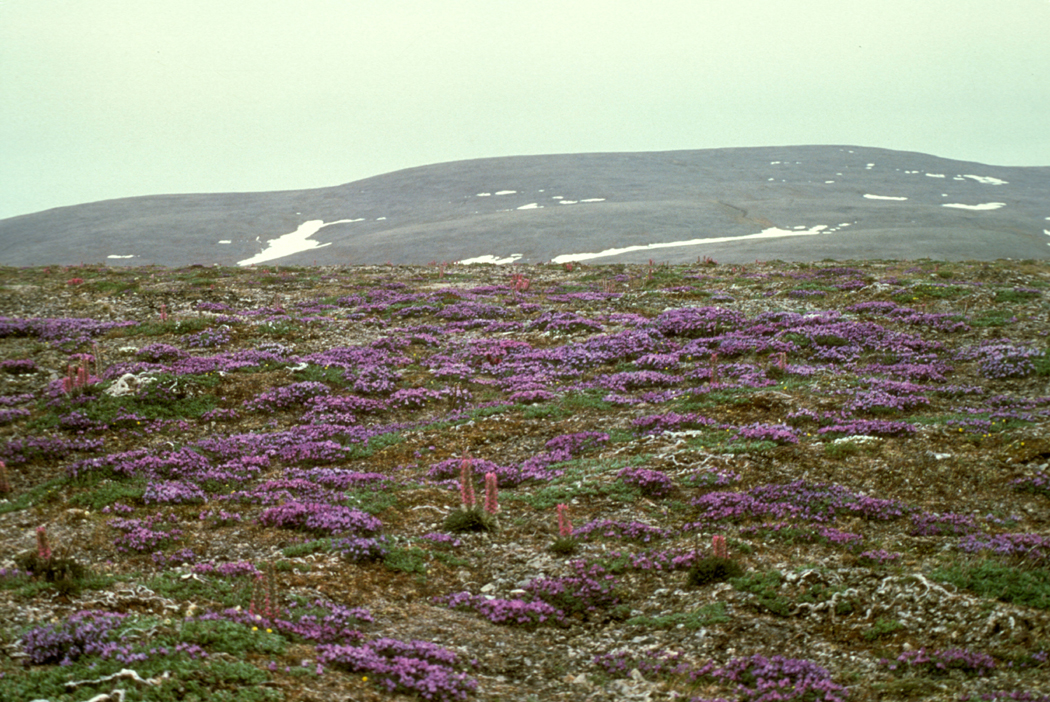
Purple oxytrope (Oxytropis nigrescens) on St. Matthew Island

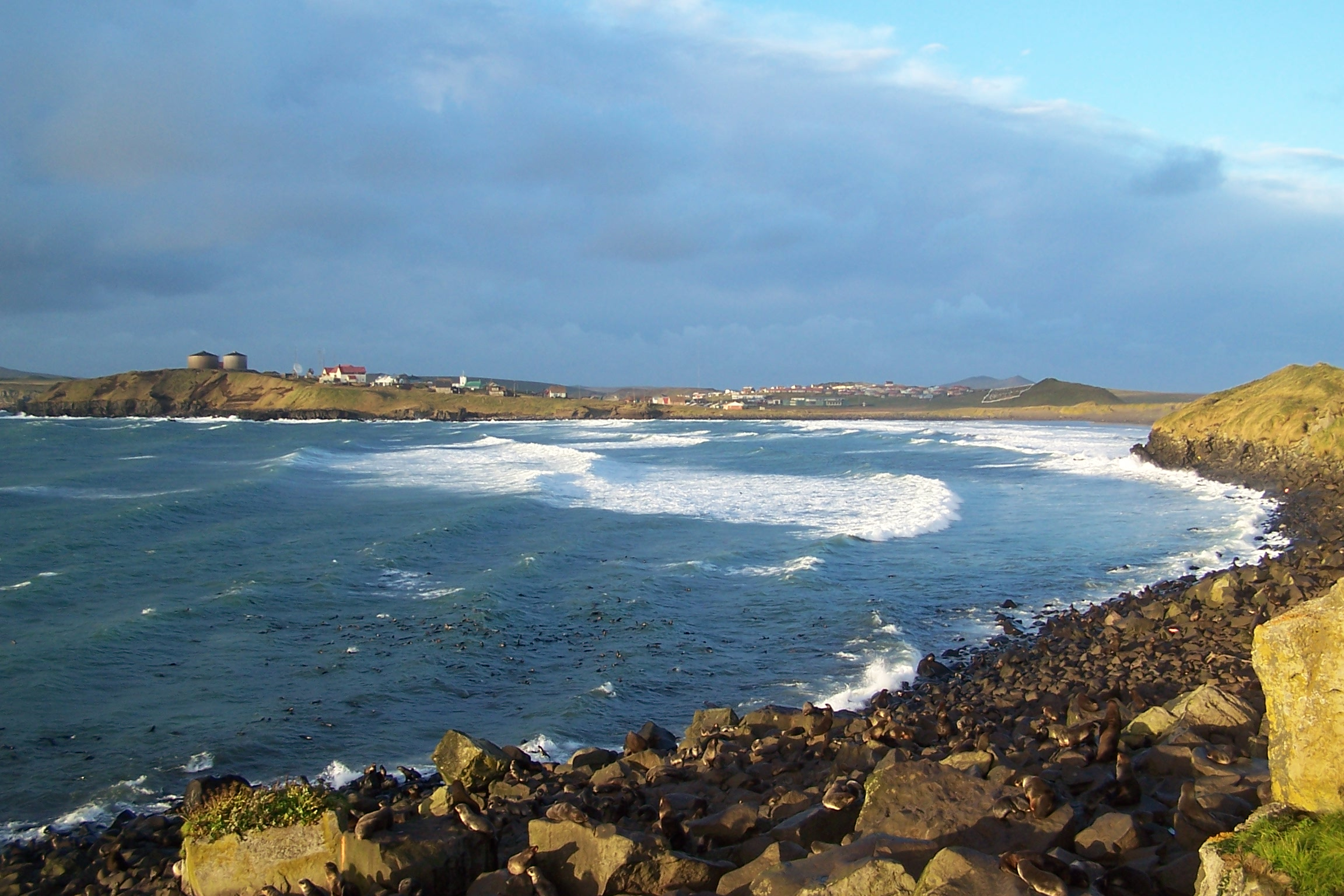
St. Paul Island

- Saahmlam Tanangis
- Sachem Head
- Sachem Island
- Sadatanak Island
- Sagchudak Island
- Sagigik Island
- Saguugaadax
- Sail Island
- Saint George Island
- Saint Ignace Island
- Saint Joseph Island
- Saint Lawrence Island
- Saint Lazaria Islands
- Saint Matthew Island
- Saint Michael Island
- Saint Paul Island
- Saint Philip Island
- Sally Island
- Salmon Island
- Saloon Island
- Salt Island
- Sam Charley Island
- Samalga Island
- San Adrian Island
- San Clemente Island
- San Fernando Island
- San Francisco Island
- San Island
- San Juan
- San Juan Bautista Island
- San Juan Island
- San Juan Islands
- San Juanito Island
- San Lorenzo Islands
- Sanak Island
- Sanak Islands
- Sand Island
- Sand Islands
- Sangao Island
- Sanguhmax
- Sanigaruak Island
- Sankin Island
- Santa Lucia Island
- Santa Rita Island
- Sarana Island
- Sarichef Island
- Sasby Island
- Sasedni Island
- Sauluktouchikh
- Savage Island
- Sawmill Island
- Sawyer Island
- Scarab Rock
- Schooner Island
- Schooner Rock
- Schrader Island
- Schumachinskaia
- Scotland Rock
- Scott Island
- Scottys Island
- Scow Island
- Scrag Islands
- Scraggy Island
- Scraggy Islands
- Screen Islands
- Scrub Island
- Scull Island
- Sea Lion Rock
- Sea Lion Rocks
- Sea Otter Island
- Sea Otter Rock
- Sea Parrot Island
- Seagull Island
- Seahorse Islands
- Seal Cove Rocks
- Seal Island
- Seal Islands
- Seal Rock
- Seal Rocks
- Sealers Island
- Sealion Island
- Sealion Islands
- Sealion Rock
- Sealion Rocks
- Sebree Island
- Second Kekur
- Second Priest Rock
- Sedanka Island
- Seguam Island
- Segula Island
- Semichi Islands
- Semidi Islands
- Semisopochnoi Island
- Sentinel Island
- Sentinel Rock
- Sentry Rock
- Sergief Island
- Serpentine Islands
- Sevenmile Island
- Shaft Rock
- Shag Island
- Shag Rock
- Shaiak Island
- Shakan Island
- Shakun Islets
- Shakun Rock
- Shale Island
- Shaman Island
- Shangin Rock
- Shapka Island
- Shaw Island
- Shaw Islands
- Sheep Island
- Shelikof Island
- Shelter Island
- Shemya Island
- Sherang Island
- Shikosi Island
- Shingle Island
- Ship Island
- Ship Islands
- Ship Rock
- Shoe Island
- Sholin Island
- Short Island
- Shoulderblade Island
- Shrub Islet
- Shrubby Island
- Shublik Island
- Shumagin Islands
- Shuyak Island
- Sigh Islands
- Sightas Island
- Siginaka Islands
- Signal Island
- Siihmlugis
- Silak Island
- Simeonof Island
- Simtusix
- Singa Island
- Sinitsin Island
- Sister Islands
- Sister Rock
- Sisters Island
- Sitam Hachan Tanangis
- Sitkalidak Island
- Sitkinak Island
- Sitklan Island
- Sitxidam Ungluu
- Sitymkan
- Siwash Island
- Sixmile Island
- Sixteenmile Island
- Sixty-foot Rock
- Skagul Island
- Skiff Island
- Skin Island
- Skinner Island
- Skowl Island
- Slate Island
- Slate Islands
- Slate Islets
- Slaughter Island
- Sledge Island
- Slim Island
- Smeaton Island
- Smelt Island
- Smith Island
- Snag Island
- Snail Rock
- Snip Islands
- Snipe Island
- Snipe Rock
- Sobaka Rock
- Sokolof Island
- Sola Rock
- Solivik Island
- Sombrero Island
- Sonora Island
- Sootin Rocks
- Sosnovoi Island
- Sound Islands
- South Amaknak Rocks
- South America Island
- South Burnett Island
- South Island
- South Marble Island
- South Pinnacle Rock
- South Punuk Island
- South Rock
- South Rocks
- Southerly Island
- Southwest Islands
- Sozavarika Island
- Spanberg Island
- Spangle Island
- Spanish Islands
- Sparrow Rocks
- Spasski Island
- Spectacle Island
- Sphinx Island
- Spider Island
- Spike Island
- Spire Island
- Spitz Island
- Split Island
- Spook Island
- Spray Island
- Spruce Island
- Spuhn Island
- Spy Islands
- Squab Island
- Square Island
- Squaw Island
- Squire Island
- Squirrel Island
- Stack Island
- Stag Island
- Stake Island
- Staney Island
- Stanhope Island
- Star Rock
- Staten Island
- Station Island
- Station Rock
- Steep Island
- Step Island
- Stevenson Island
- Stewart Island
- Stewart Rock
- Still Island
- Stockton Islands
- Stone Island
- Stone Islands
- Stone Rock
- Stop Island
- Storey Island
- Storm Islands
- Stout Island
- Straight Island
- Strait Island
- Strauss Rock
- Strawberry Island
- Streets Island
- Stripe Rock
- Stuart Island
- Stump Island
- Sturdevant Rock
- Sturgess Island
- Sud Island
- Suedla Island
- Suemez Island
- Sugarloaf Island
- Suhti Island
- Sukkwan Island
- Suklik Island
- Sukoi Islets
- Sullivan Island
- Sullivan Rock
- Suloia Islet
- Suloia Rock
- Sumdum Island
- Summit Island
- Sumner Island
- Sun Rocks
- Sundstrom Island
- Sunset Island
- Sunshine Island
- Surf Rock
- Sushilna Island
- Sushilnoi Island
- Sutwik Island
- Suuksax
- Svensen Rock
- Svitlak Island
- Swallow Rocks
- Swan Island
- Swanson Island
- Swirl Rock

== T ==
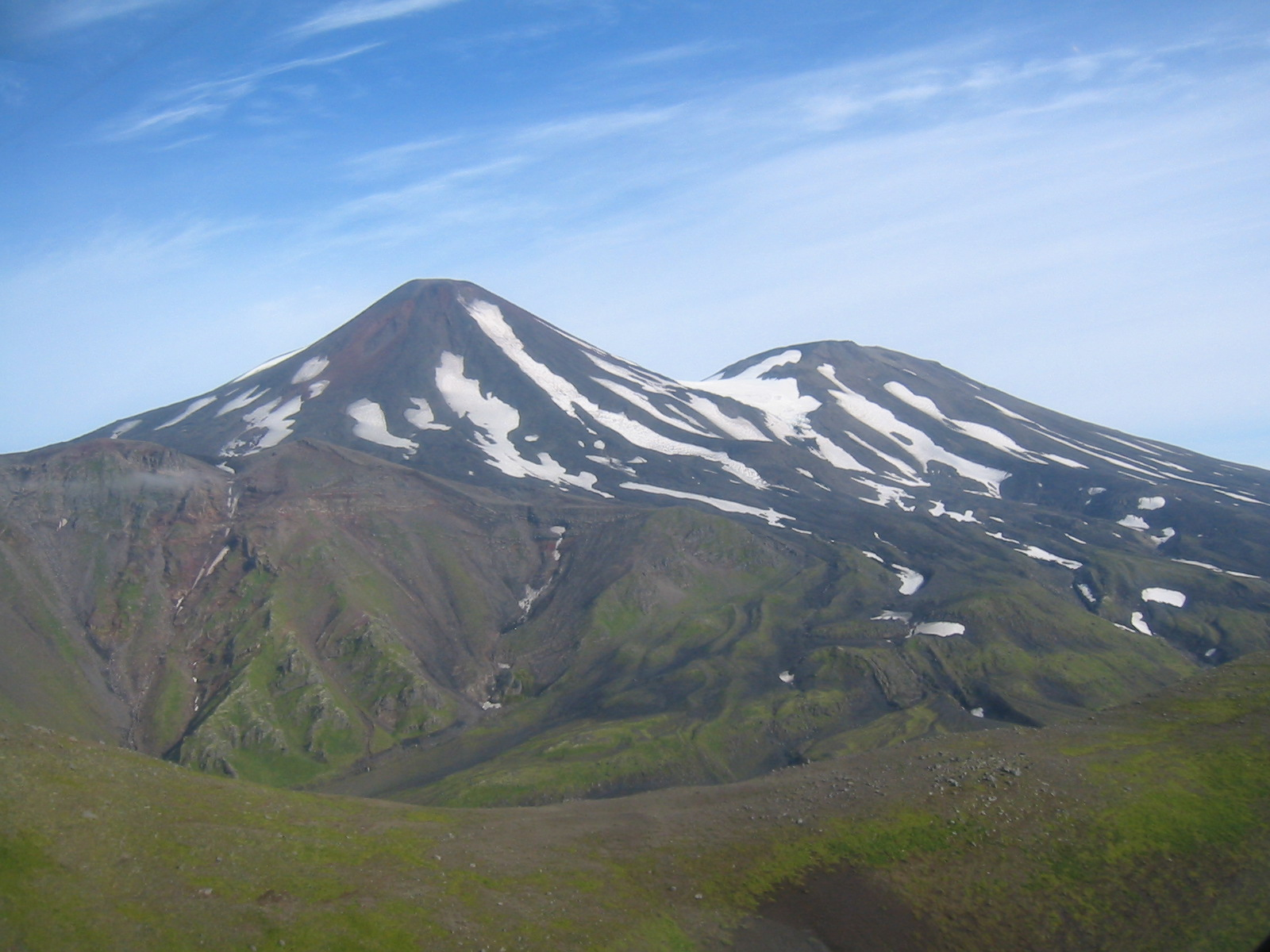
Tanaga Island volcanoes

- Taagan'gisix
- Table Island
- Table Rock
- Tag Islands
- Tagadak Island
- Tagalak Island
- Tah Island
- Taigud Island
- Taigud Islands
- Takatz Islands
- Takli Island
- Taliudek Island
- Talsani Island
- Tamalax
- Tan'gaagamax
- Tan'gan
- Tanadak Island
- Tanaga Island
- Tanaklak Island
- Tanam Aduu
- Tanam Amayaknangis
- Tanana Island
- Tanasux
- Tanasxan Tangingin
- Tanax Angunax
- Tanaxchigis
- Tangik Island
- Tanginak Island
- Tanker Island
- Tapkaluk Islands
- Tappghappaghak
- Taqusas
- Target Island
- Tatoosh Islands
- Tava Island
- Tay'in Uq'e Tiytalyashi
- Taylor Island
- Teal Island
- Teapot Rock
- Teck Island
- Telemitz Island
- Tenass Island
- Tenmile Island
- Tentree Island
- Terbilon Island
- Terrace Island
- The Brothers
- The Desert
- The Eckholms
- The Eye Opener
- The Five Fingers
- The Haystack
- The Haystacks
- The Kittens
- The Needle
- The Pinnacle
- The Sentinels
- The Signals
- The Sisters
- The Three Sisters
- The Toadstools
- The Triplets
- The Twins
- The Wallypogs
- The Whaleback
- The Witnesses
- Theodore Island
- Thetis Island
- Third Kekur
- Thistle Rock
- Thomas Island
- Thorne Island
- Three Brothers
- Three Hill Island
- Three Islands
- Three Sisters Rock
- Three Sisters Rocks
- Three Tree Island
- Threenob Rock
- Tide Island
- Tidgituk Island
- Tiedeman Island
- Tigalda Island
- Tigvariak Island
- Tihniqidas
- Tikhaia Islands
- Timbered Island
- Tingberg Island
- Tiny Island
- Titcliff Island
- Titus Island
- Tiurpa Island
- Tla-xagh Island
- Tolstoi Island
- Tombstone Rocks
- Tommy Island
- Tongass Island
- Tonina Island
- Torsar Island
- Totem Rock
- Toti Island
- Toussaint Island
- Toza Island
- Tozitna Island
- Track Rock
- Traders Island
- Trap Rock
- Trasera Island
- Treat Island
- Tree Island
- Treeless Island
- Tremel Island
- Triangle Island
- Trim Island
- Trinity Islands
- Triplet Islands
- Triplet Rocks
- Triste Island
- Troller Islands
- Trouble Island
- Trunk Island
- Tsitus Island
- Tuft Rock
- Tugidak Island
- Tulimanik Island
- Tungluqas
- Tungulik
- Turn Island
- Turnabout Island
- Turner Island
- Turning Island
- Turtle Island
- Tuscarora Rock
- Tuxekan Island
- Twelvemile Island
- Twin Island
- Twin Islands
- Twin Islet
- Twin Rocks
- Twins
- Two Tree Island
- Twocrack Island
- Twoheaded Island
- Twomile Island

== U ==
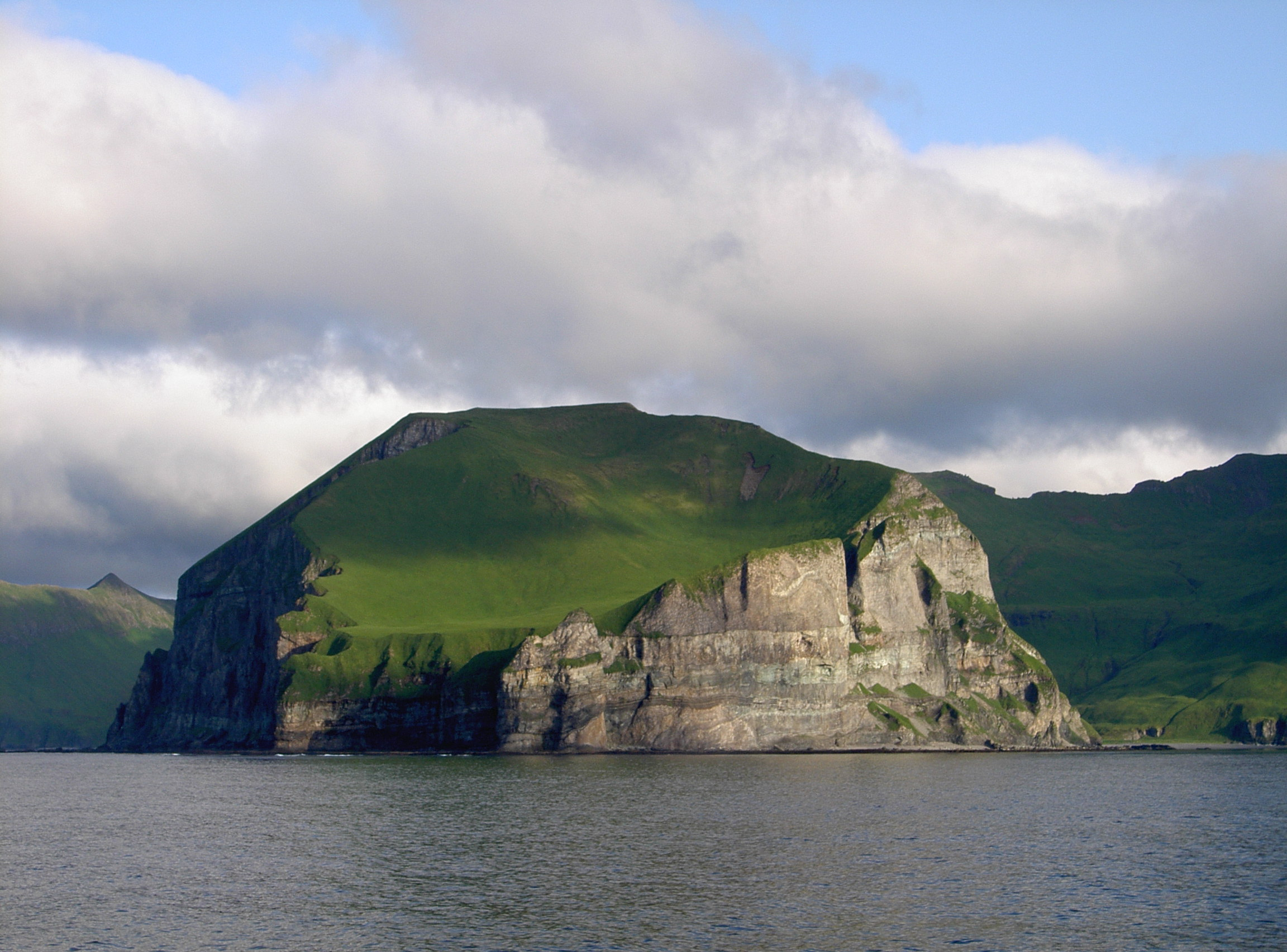
Cape Promontory, Unimak Island

- Ubi Island
- Uchixsax
- Ugaiushak Island
- Ugak Island
- Ugalux
- Ugamak Island
- Uganik Island
- Ugidak Island
- Ukolnoi Island
- Ukolnoi Rocks
- Ulak Island
- Uliaga Island
- Ulinoi Island
- Ulloa Island
- Umak Island
- Umga Island
- Umla Island
- Umnak Island
- Unalaska Island
- Unalga Island (Delarof Islands)
- Unalga Island (Fox Islands)
- Unavikshak Island
- Unga Island
- Ungluchin
- Unglulagan
- Ungluugamax
- Unglux
- Unguchiing Achidan Tanangis
- Unguchiing Hachan Tangingis
- Unimak Island
- Unishka Island
- Unlucky Island
- Urilof Island
- Ushagat Island
- Uski Island
- Utesistoi Island
- Uuyax
- Uyak Island
- Uzamkum-tanasuu

== V ==
- Vachon Island
- Vallenar Rock
- Vancouver Island
- Vank Island
- Vantage Rock
- Vasilief Islands
- Vasilief Rock
- Vegas Island
- Vegas Islands
- Verdant Island
- Verde Island
- Vert Island
- Vichnefski Rock
- Victor Island
- Viesoki Island
- Viesokoi Rock
- Viking Rock
- Village Island
- Village Islands
- Village Rock
- Virublennoi Island
- Vitskari Island
- Vitskari Rocks
- Vixen Islands
- Volga Island
- Vorota Island
- Vsevidof Island

== W ==
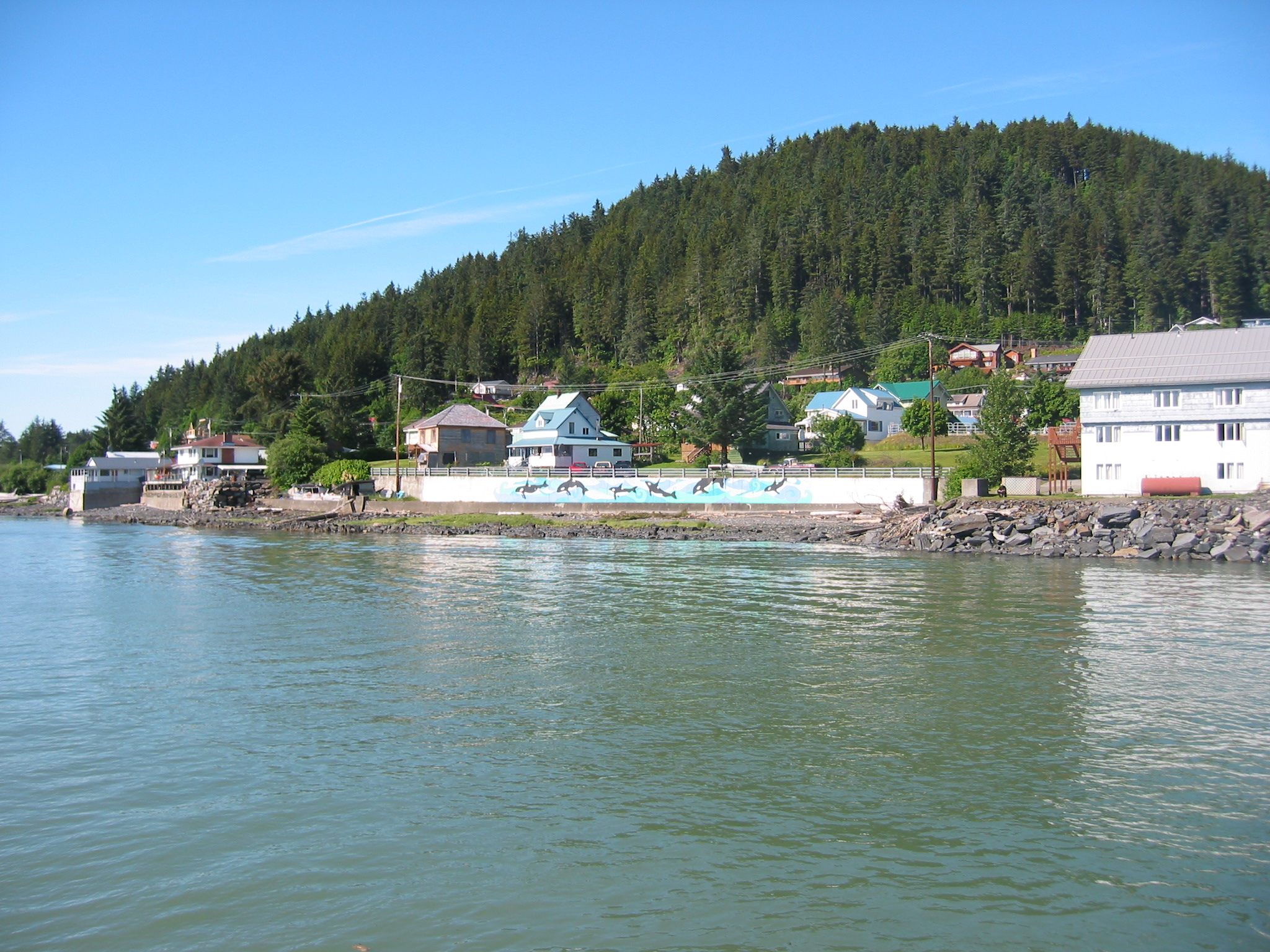
Mt. Dewey on Wrangell Island

- W Francis Rock
- Wadleigh Island
- Wadleigh Rock
- Waite Island
- Waldron Island
- Walker Island
- Wallace Rock
- Walrus Island
- Walrus Island
- Walrus Islands
- Walter Island
- Wanda Island
- Warburton Island
- Warren Island
- Wedge Island
- Wedge Islands
- Weeping Peat Island
- Weir Island
- Wenrich Island
- Werlick Island
- West Amatuli Island
- West Bee Rock
- West Brother Island
- West Channel Island
- West Flank Island
- West Francis Rock
- West Island
- West Mill Rock
- West Redcliff Island
- West Rock
- West San Lorenzo Island
- West Sentinel Island
- Westerly Island
- Whale Head Island
- Whale Island
- Whale Rock
- Whaleback Island
- Whip Island
- Whirlpool Island
- Whirlpool Rock
- Whiskey Island
- White Cliff Island
- White Crag Island
- White Gull Island
- White Rock
- White Rocks
- White Sisters
- Whiterock Island
- Whitestone Rock
- Whitney Island
- Whontleya
- Wilby Island
- Willard Island
- Willoughby Island
- Willow Island
- Willow Islands
- Wilson Islands
- Windfall Island
- Windfall Islands
- Windy Island
- Wingham Island
- Winifred Island
- Winstanley Island
- Winter Island
- Wislow Island
- Woewodski Island
- Wolf Rock
- Wood Islands
- Woodchoppers Island
- Wooded Island
- Wooded Islands
- Wooden Island
- Woody Island
- Woronkofski Island
- Wosnesenski Island
- Wrangell Island

== Y ==
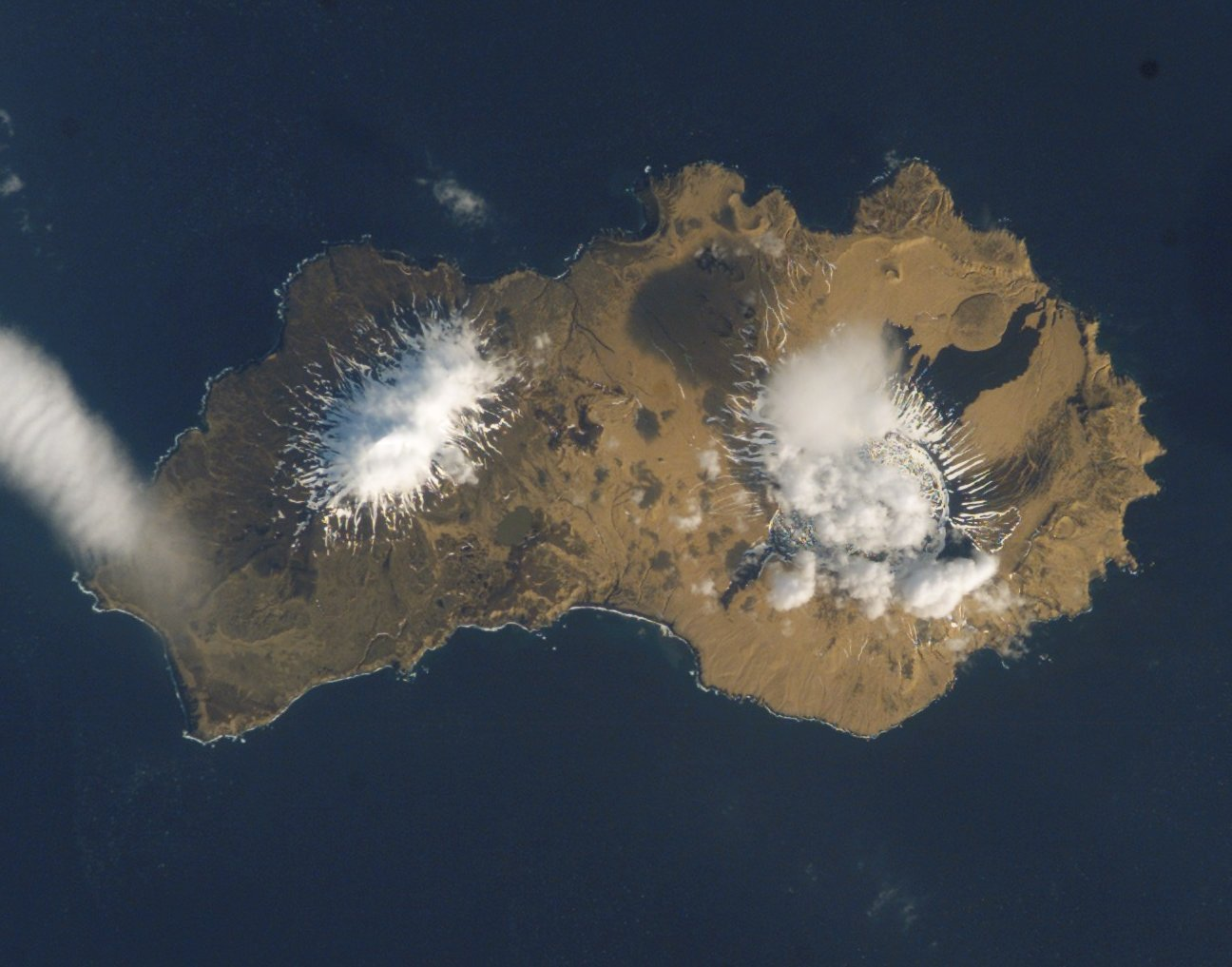
Yunaska Island

- Yakobi Island
- Yakobi Rock
- Yamani Islets
- Yasha Island
- Yellow Island
- Yellow Rock
- Yellow Rocks
- Yelnu Islets
- Young Island
- Young Rock
- Youngs Island
- Yuki Island
- Yukon Island
- Yunaska Island
- Yusdishlaq'

== Z ==
- Zaimka Island
- Zarembo Island
- Zenobia Rock
- Zimovia Islets
- Zip Rock
- Zubof Rock

== See also ==
- List of lakes of Alaska
- List of rivers of Alaska
- List of waterfalls of Alaska
