= List of Alaska placenames of Native American origin =

The following list includes settlements, geographic features, and political subdivisions of Alaska whose names are derived from Native American languages.

== Listings ==
=== Boroughs and census areas ===
- Aleutians West and Aleutians East
- Chugach – the Chugach tribe.
- Denali – from the Koyukon word deenaalee, which translates to "the high one" or "the tall one."
  - Shared with the mountain Denali.
- Hoonah–Angoon – from the Tlingit phrases Xunaa and Aangóon, meaning “lee of the north wind" and "isthmus town."
  - Shared with the cities of Hoonah and Angoon.
- Kenai Peninsula – from the Dena'ina phrase dena, meaning "flat meadow" or "open area with few trees."
  - Shared with the city of Kenai.
- Ketchikan Gateway – from the Tlingit phrase kichx̱áan, whose English translation is unclear.
  - Shared with the city of Ketchikan.
- Kodiak Island – from the Alutiiq phrase qikertaq, meaning "island."
  - Shared with the island of Kodiak, and its largest city Kodiak.
- Kusilvak - from the Central Alaskan Yupʼik phrase Ingrill'er or Ingrillrat, meaning "old or shabby mountains."
  - Shared with the Kusilvak Mountains.
- Matanuska-Susitna – from the Denaʼina phrase Suyitnu, meaning "sand / sandy river"
  - Shared with the Matanuska and Susitna rivers.
- The City and Borough of Sitka – from the Tlingit phrase shee at'iká, meaning "people on the outside of Baranof Island."
- The Municipality and Borough of Skagway – from the Tlingit phrase sha-ka-géi, meaning "a windy place with white caps on the water."
- The City and Borough of Yakutat – from the Tlingit phrase yaakwdáat, meaning "the place where canoes rest."
  - Shared with the neighboring Yakutat Bay.
- Yukon–Koyukuk – from the Gwichʼin and Central Alaskan Yupʼik phrases chųų gąįį han and kuik-yuk, meaning "great river" and "a river."

=== Settlements ===
- Adak – from the Aleut phrase adaax, whose English translation is unclear.
  - Shared with Adak Island
- Alakanuk – from the Yupik phrase alakanuk, meaning "wrong way".
- Akutan – from the Aleut phrase achan-ingiiga, whose English translation is unclear.
  - Shared with Akutan Bay, Mount Akutan, Akutan Island and the Akutan Hot Springs.
- Atka – from the Aleut phrase atxax, whose English translation is unclear.
- Chevak – from the Cup'ik phrase cev'aq, meaning "cut-through channel".
- Eklutna – from the Dena'ina phrase idluytnu, meaning "river of objects".
  - Shared with the Eklutna River and Eklutna Lake.
- Emmonak – from the Yup'ik phrase imangaq, whose English translation is unclear.
- Hoonah – from the Tlingit phrase xunaa, meaning "leeward of the north wind".
- Klawock – from the Tlingit phrase ɬawa:k, the name given to a subgroup of the Tlingit tribe.
- Kotlik – from the Yup'ik phrase qerrulliik, whose English translation is unclear.
- Kwethluk – from the Yup'ik phrase kuiggluk, meaning "unnatural river".
- Noorvik – from the Iñupiaq phrase nuurvik, meaning "a place to move to".
- Nunapitchuk – from the Yup'ik phrase nunapicuar, whose English translation is unclear.
- Quinhagak – from the Yup'ik phrase kuinerraq, meaning "new river channel".
- Savoonga – from the Yup'ik phrase sivungaq, whose English translation is unclear.
- Selawik – from the Iñupiaq phrase siiḷivik, meaning "the place of sheefish".
  - Shared with the nearby Selawik Lake.
- Toksook Bay – from the Yup'ik phrase tuqsuk, whose English translation is unclear.
- Unalakleet – from the Iñupiaq phrase uŋalaqłiq, meaning "from the southern side".
- Unalaska – from the Aleut phrase ounalashka, meaning "near the peninsula".
  - Shared with Unalaska Island.
- Utqiagvik – from the Iñupiaq word utqiq, meaning "edible root", full name means "place to gather edible roots".
- Wasilla – named after the eponymous Dena'ina chief.

=== Bodies of water ===
- Agiapuk River
- Aichilik River
- Akulik Creek
- Alagnak River
- Alatna River
- Aleknagik Lake
- Alsek River
- Anaktuvuk River
- Aniak River
- Aniakchak River
- Anvik River
- Aropuk Lake
- Atchuelinguk River
- Atigun River
- Avingak Creek
- Auke Lake
- Awuna River
- Ayakulik River
- Binnyanaktuk Creek – from an Iñupiaq phrase meaning "superlatively rugged".
- Bonasila River
- Casadepaga River
- Chakachatna River
- Chatanika River
- Chena River
- Chilikadrotna River
- Chilkat River
- Chilkoot Lake
- Chilkoot River
- Chitina River
- Chulitna River
- Ciissinraq River
- Cosna River
- Deshka River
- Draanjik River
- Eek River
- Egegik River
- Eklutna Lake
- Eklutna River
- Etivluk River
- Gakona River
- Gulkana River
- Hodzana River
- Hogatza River
- Holitna River
- Huslia River
- Iditarod River
- Igushik River
- Iliamna Lake – from the Dena'ina phrase nila vena, meaning "lake of the island".
- Iliamna River
- Ikpikpuk River
- Imuruk Lake
- Iniakuk Lake
- Innoko River
- Ipnavik River
- Ipnek Creek – from an Iñupiaq word ipnaiq meaning "sheep".
- Itkillik River
- Ivishak River
- Kadleroshilik River
- Kandik River
- Kanektok River
- Kantishna River
- Kanuti River
- Kapoon Creek – named after an Inuk resident from Wiseman.
- Karluk River
- Kavik River
- Karillyukpuk Creek – from an Iñupiaq phrase meaning "very rugged".
- Kenai River
- Kenunga Creek – from an Iñupiaq phrase meaning "knife edge".
- Killik River
- Kinnorutin Creek – from an Iñupiaq phrase Kinnaurutin meaning "you are crazy".
- Kivalina River
- Kiwalik River
- Klehini River
- Klutina River
- Knik River
- Kobuk River
- Kokolik River
- Kongakut River
- Kontrashibuna Lake
- Kougarok River
- Koyuk River
- Koyukuk River
  - North Fork Koyukuk River
  - Middle Fork Koyukuk River
- Kruzgamepa River
- Kugarak River
- Kugruk River
- Kuk River
- Kuparuk River
- Kukpowruk River
- Kukpuk River
- Kupuk Creek – named after an Inuk resident from Wiseman.
- Kuskokwim River
- Kuzitrin River
- Kvichak River
- Mashooshalluk Creek – from an Iñupiaq word masu meaning "wild potato plant".
- Melozitna River
- Meshik River
- Mulchatna River
- Mutaktuk Creek
- Nabesna River
- Naknek Lake
- Naknek River
- Nenana River
- Newhalen River
- Nigikmigoon River
- Ningaluk River
- Ninilchik River
- Niukluk River
- Nizina River
- Noatak River
- Nowitna River
- Noxapaga River
- Nugnugaluktuk River
- Nushagak River
- Nutirwik Creek – named after an Inuk hunter.
- Nuyakuk River
- Okpilak River
- Pamichtuk Lake – from an Iñupiaq phrase meaning "other".
- Pegeeluk Creek – from an Iñupiaq word pigiilaq meaning "not very good".
- Pitmegea River
- Publituk Creek – from an Iñupiaq phrase meaning "hollow, drumlike sound made when walking on shell ice".
- Sagavanirktok River
- Salcha River
- Selawik Lake
- Selawik River
- Sheenjek River
- Shukok Creek – from an Iñupiaq phrase meaning "rock found on a creek".
- Skagway River
- Skwentna River
- Slana River
- Stikine River
- Susitna River
  - Little Susitna River
- Tagagawik River
- Taiya River
- Taku River
- Talachulitna River
- Talkeetna River
- Tana River
- Tanana River
- Tazlina Lake
- Tazlina River
- Teklanika River
- Teshekpuk Lake – from the Iñupiaq phrase tasiqpak, meaning "large lagoon".
- Tikchik River
- Tinayguk River
- Tlikakila River
- Tobuk Creek – named after an Inuk resident from Alatna.
- Togiak Lake
- Togiak River
- Toklat River
- Tsirku River
- Tubutulik River
- Tustumena Lake
- Ugashik Lakes
- Ugashik River
- Unalakleet River
- Unuk River
- Utukok River
- Wulik River
- Yahtse River
- Yentna River
- Yukon River

=== Islands ===
- Aagumchiidalix Island
- Aalikam Tangii Island
- Adak Island
- Adugak Island
- Afognak Island
- Agattu Island
- Aiktak Island
- Akun Island
- Amak Island
  - Mount Amak
- Amaknak Island
- Amatignak Island
- Amchitka Island
- Amlia Island
- Amukta Island
  - Mount Amukta
- Anangula Island
- Atka Island
- Attu Island
- Avatanak Island
- Aziak Island
- Big Koniuji Island
- Chagulak Island
- Chenega Island
- Chuginadak Island
- Chugul Island
- Great Sitkin Island
- Hawadax Island
- Igitkin Island
- Ilak Island
- Kagalaska Island
- Kagamil Island
- Kalgin Island
- Kaligagan Island
- Kanaga Island
- Kasatochi Island
- Kigigak Island
- Killisnoo Island
- Kodiak Island
  - City of Kodiak
- Kuiu Island
- Little Sitkin Island
- Little Tanaga Island
- Nuka Island
- Nunivak Island
- Oglodak Island
- Rootok Island
- Sagchudak Island
- Samalga Island
- Sanak Islands
  - Sanak Island
- Sedanka Island
- Seguam Island
- Segula Island
- Semichi Islands
  - Shemya Island
- Shuyak Island
- Sitkalidak Island
- Sitkinak Island
- Sukkwan Island
- Sutwik Island
- Tagalak Island
- Tanaga Island
- Tigalda Island
- Tongass Island
- Tugidak Island
- Ugamak Island
- Uganik Island
- Ulak Island
- Uliaga Island
- Umak Island
- Umnak Island
- Unalaska Island
  - City of Unalaska
- Unalga Island – from the Aleut phrase unalĝa, whose English translation is unclear.
  - Shared with another Unalga Island in the Delarof Islands.
- Unga Island – from the Aleut phrase uĝnaasaqax̂, whose English translation is unclear.
- Unimak Island – from the Aleut phrase unimax, whose English translation is unclear.
- Yukon Island
- Yunaska Island

=== Other ===
- Alapah Mountain – from an Iñupiaq word alappaa meaning "cold".
- Amawk Mountain – from an Iñupiaq word amaġuq meaning "wolf".
- Apoon Mountain – from an Iñupiaq word apun meaning "snow".
- Arrigetch Peaks – from an Iñupiaq word argaich meaning "fingers outstretched".
- Denali, Denali National Park – from Koyukon deenaalee, "the tall one" (with -naał-, "be long/tall").
- Katiktak Mountain – from an Iñupiaq phrase qatiqtaaq meaning "white".
- Kollutuk Mountain – from an Iñupiaq phrase kałuutik meaning "sheep horn dipper".
- Mount Doonerak – from an Iñupiaq phrase tuunġaq meaning "shaman's helping spirit".
- Mount Tlingit - the Tlingit people.
- Nahtuk Mountain – from an Iñupiaq phrase naataq meaning "great grey owl".
- Oolah Mountain – from an Iñupiaq phrase meaning "ulu (scraping tool)".
- Oxadak Mountain – named after an Inuk elder.
- Sukakpak Mountain – from an Iñupiaq phrase meaning "marten deadfall".

== See also ==
- List of place names in the United States of Native American origin
