= Fox Islands Passes =

Waterways in Alaska, United States

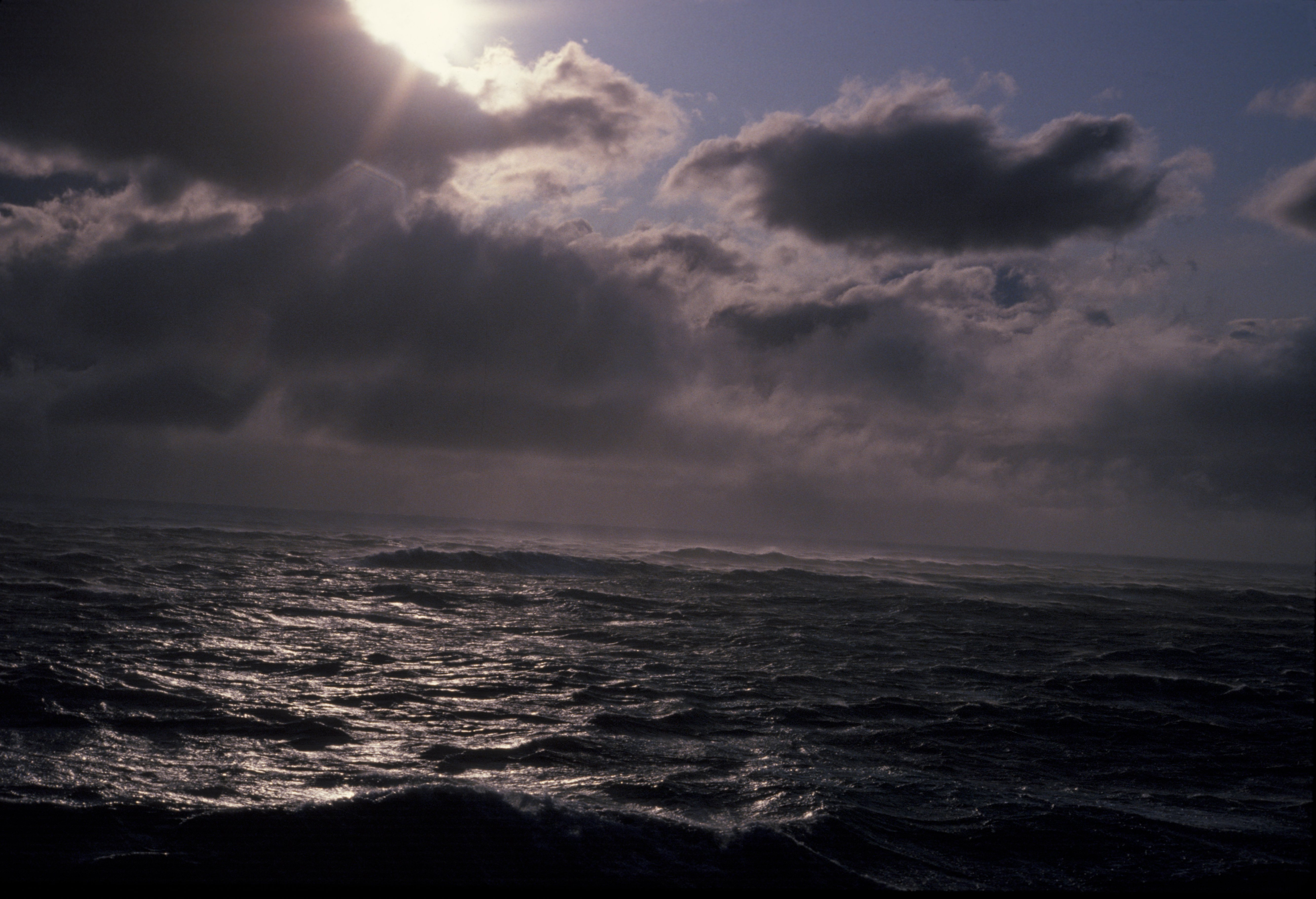
Tide rips in Unimak Pass.

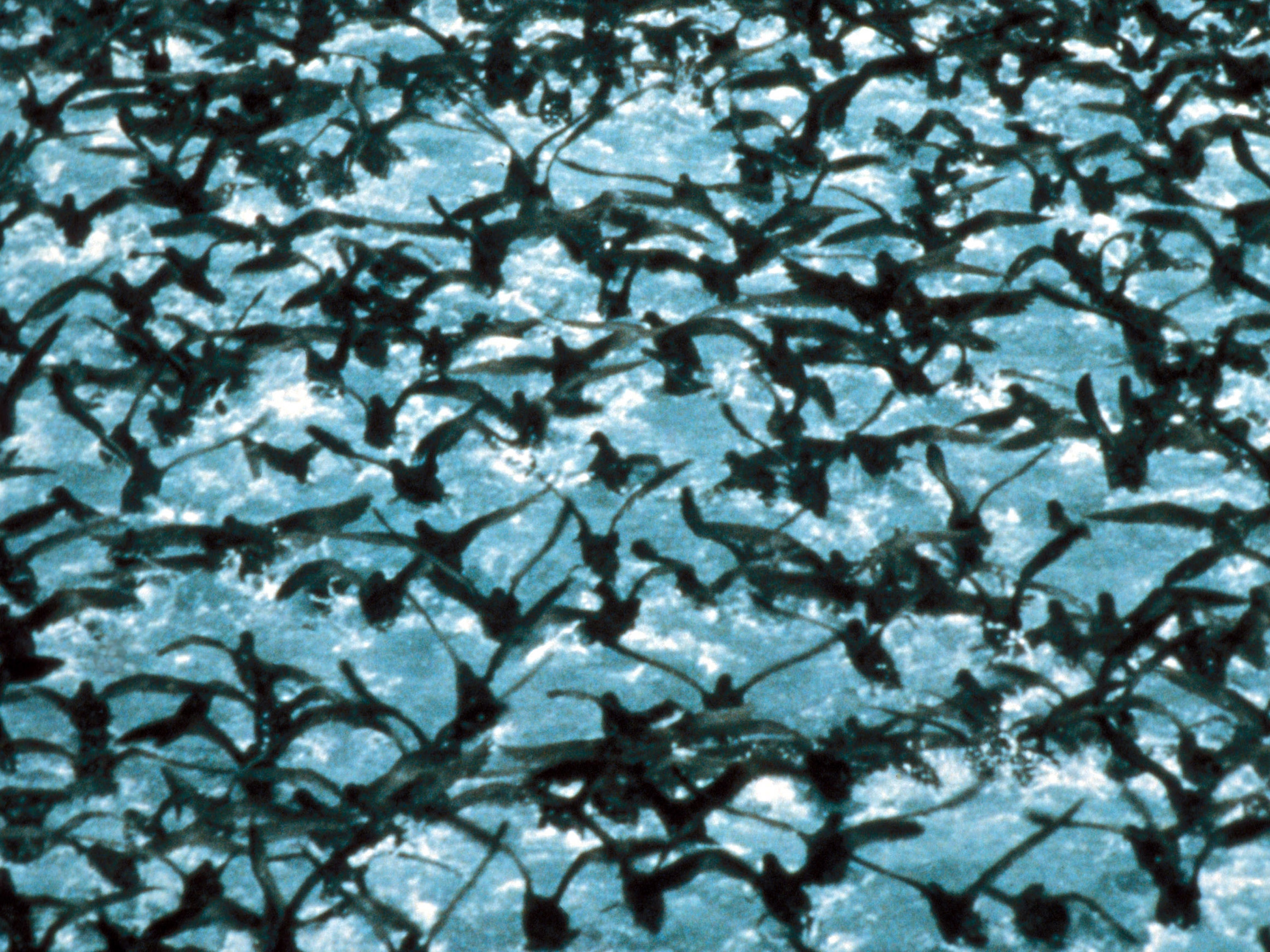
Unimak pass shearwater flock.

The Fox Islands Passes are waterways in the Fox Islands area of the U.S. state of Alaska, connecting the Bering Sea with the North Pacific Ocean.

From the southward and eastward, bound for Bering Sea, there are three passes used by deep-draft vessels, known collectively as the Fox Islands Passes, and respectively as Unimak, Akutan, and Unalga passes. The largest and most desirable one to use in thick and foggy weather is the eastern one, Unimak Pass. This is clear of hidden dangers, the widest of the three, and is comparatively free from tide rips. It is especially recommended for sailing vessels, and for steamers bound direct to the northward.

Akutan and Unalga passes are convenient for steam vessels bound to Unalaska Bay, but, being narrow and having strong currents and tide rips at times, are not recommended for sailing vessels bound north. A fair wind is almost necessary for the passage, and from the southward this would bring fog. The pass between Ashmiak and Ugamok islands on the east and Sea Lion Island on the west may be clear of dangers, but it is not recommended. All of the other minor passes between Unimak and Akutan passes are known to be full of rocks and reefs.

The mountains in this vicinity would be excellent landmarks if they could be seen, but in summer they are almost always obscured by fogs or low-lying clouds. The lower hills and islands and objects near the sea level furnish the available landmarks. In coming from the southward or eastward in clear weather, and if bound through Akutan or Unalga passes, it is recommended to steer for Tigalda Island as the first land to be made. It is high and prominent, and when once made a course can be shaped for any of the three passes.

== Description ==
=== Unimak Pass ===
Unimak Pass (54°20′01″N 164°55′14″W) is the widest of the Fox Islands Passes, being 9 or 10 miles wide in its narrowest part. It is clear of hidden dangers, free from dangerous tide rips, and the tidal current has less velocity than in the other passes. Except near shore, it is free of sudden blasts of wind descending from the mountainous coast to the sea, known as williwaws. It is the most desirable pass for sailing vessels, and also for all vessels not calling at Unalaska Bay. In approaching from the southward and eastward, care must be taken to keep clear of Sannak Reefs and Anderson and Lenard rocks. If very clear, the mountains of Unimak Island may be made out and the course for Unimak Pass shaped accordingly; but under ordinary conditions the hills back of Cape Khituk, or Ugamok Island, will be the first land sighted. If the weather is thick, soundings on Davidson Bank will be of use in feeling the way in to the land. In the vicinity of Cape Khituk the coast is bold and free from outlying dangers.

A reef of rocks was formerly shown on the chart extending between 1 and 2 miles from the east end of Ugamok Island. The IMO Maritime Safety Committee per IMO SN.1/Circ.331 adopted five 'Areas to Be Avoided' (ATBA) in the region of the Aleutian Island Archipelago in order to reduce the risk of a marine casualty and resulting pollution and damage to the environment. These new ATBA’s came into effect on January 1, 2016.

The five ATBA’s apply to vessels solely in transit through the Bering Sea and North Pacific Ocean and in most areas extends no further than 50 nautical miles from the shoreline of the islands. The 50 nautical mile buffer zone is designed to allow for the repair of, or time to launch an emergency response effort to any marine casualty before it runs aground and damages the fragile ecosystem. The establishment of the ATBA adds minimal distance to a voyage.

=== Akutan Pass ===
Akutan Pass is about 3 miles wide in its narrowest part. There are four small islets (Gull Rocks) on the western side of the pass, less than 1 mile from Unalga Island, with many detached rocks above water in the same group, but not extending beyond the islets into the pass. There is a reef with some pinnacle rocks on it extending from Cape Morgan not more than 1 mile into the pass. With these exceptions there are no known dangers. The current and tide rips are not so strong as in Unalga Pass. On this account, and because of its greater width and the fact that a straight course will carry through, this pass is preferred by many to Unalga Pass.

Akutan Pass is recommended for steamers bound to or from Unalaska Bay, and for sailing vessels from Unalaska Bay, having a fair wind. From the southward it is recommended to make the land in the vicinity of Tigalda Island and Avatanak Island and follow along the south side of these islands until the course is shaped from Rootok Island to Cape Morgan. From Cape Morgan a west by south course, making allowance for the current, will carry clear of the ledge off Cape Kalekhta. From Unalaska Bay, after clearing Cape Kalekhta, Akutan Pass is open and an east by north course can be steered through.

=== Unalga Pass ===
Unalga Pass is the small pass between Unalga and Unalaska islands. It is the narrowest and shortest of the three passes, and is more generally used by steamers bound to and from Unalaska Bay than either of the other two. It is about one mile wide in its narrowest part, and, with the exception of rocks above water which make out a short distance from the points of Unalaska Island, the pass is considered free from dangers. In the middle of the pass there are depths of 25 to 35 fathoms, with deeper water northwestward and southeastward. Its worst features are the strong tidal currents and tide rips, both of which are generally considered worse in this pass than in either of the other two; williwaws of great force are also experienced -in this pass. The advantage of using this pass in thick weather is that the shore of Unalga Island is clear of dangers, and when made can be followed close enough to keep it in sight while going through. The Signals, Egg Island, and Old Man are the prominent landmarks for making Unalga Pass from the southeastward.

== Soundings ==
To the southward of the passes, the 100-fathom curve is found from 20 to 40 miles offshore, and when inside of this depth the color of the water will have changed from dark blue to light green. This change in the color of the water is the best indication the mariner has in thick weather to warn him of his approach to land and that he is on soundings. Southwest of Unimak Pass the 50-fathom curve is from 3 to 5 miles offshore, and in thick weather the greatest caution should be used in approaching inside of this depth. Southeast of Unimak Pass, the water shoals rapidly from 100 fathoms to Davidson Bank, on which a least depth of 37 fathoms is marked 33 miles from Ugamok Island.

== Tides and currents ==
In the vicinity of the passes and in the passes, the tidal currents are strong and their directions uncertain. The current sets southward during the falling tide and northward during the rising tide, which is the longer and stronger of the two. Its velocity varies, but in Unalga Pass, where it is greatest, it has been found to be 61 knots an hour during the whole of the tide, and the current turned to the opposite direction at the same velocity in twenty minutes. At ordinary times the tidal current does not amount to more than three or four knots. On the Bering Sea side of Unalga and Akutan passes, with a strong northerly or northwesterly wind, heavy tide rips are raised. These do not extend through the passes, but seem to be confined to the Bering Sea side from about the middle of Unalga Island almost to Cape Kalekhta. With the ebb tide, a southerly wind does not seem to raise corresponding rips on the Pacific side. When the tide rips are heavy, the water is broken into heavy, choppy seas from every direction. Uniinak Pass is comparatively free from tide rips. In ordinary weather it is high or low water in Akutan Pass between one and two hours before high or low water at Dutch Harbor.

== Anchorages ==
Beaver Inlet, between Biorka and Unalaska islands, is a deep inlet on the western side of the southern entrance to Unalga Pass. There are several bays leading out of Beaver Inlet. The best anchorage is said to be in Food Bay, on the north side of the inlet, near its entrance. The anchorage near the shore off the village of Biorka, on the south side of the inlet, is poor on account of the deep water; it affords shelter in southerly weather. English Bay, southwest of Unalga Island, is a good harbor. The water is deep, and there are no dangers except on both sides of the entrance, near the shore. The anchorage is at the head of the bay, in about 10 fathoms. Kalekhta Bay, eastward of Cape Kalekhta, is clear of dangers except along shore. Anchorage should not be made in less than 10 fathoms. The bay is much smaller in every way than Unalaska Bay, but it is marked by a cascade on its western side not unlike the one recommended as a landmark for Unalaska Bay. There is also a pinnacle rock off Erskine Point, the eastern point at the entrance, somewhat similar to Priest Rock; but this rock is distinguished by a smaller one between it and Erskine Point.

== Prominent features ==
=== Peaks ===
- Shishaldin Volcano, nearly 9,000 feet high, is cone-shaped and very regular in outline, with faint wreaths of smoke and vapor at times drifting from its blackened tip. It is for the most part snow-clad, except where the rocky cliffs and projections afford no lodgment.
- Isanotski Peaks is seen close to the eastward of Shishaldin, very rugged, and having a broken or castellated double peak. The summit is bare and looks as though composed of great vertical rock masses.
- Pogrumnoi Volcano, over 5,500 feet high, is a rugged, snow-clad peak, with dark vertical ridges cropping through the snow. From a flat-topped dome, apparently as high as Pogrumnoi, but seemingly not connected with it, there extends a long, high, snow-covered table-land, dipping gradually toward Cape Khituk. Except the snow-covered portions, the general color is green during July and August, from the grass-covered slopes. Pogrumnoi is a guiding landmark in clear weather in making Unimak Pass.

=== Islands ===
- Ugamok Island is rugged in outline, with bold rocky cliffs. It is highest at the eastern end, where there is a sharp conical peak, which is very conspicuous, and may often be seen when the summits of the higher islands in the vicinity are obscured by fog. The northern and eastern sides of the island are free from dangers.
- Tigalda Island is high and prominent, with distinctly rounded hills, resembling knuckles. The southern shore of the island can be approached as close as 1 mile. The northern and northwestern sides of the island are foul and should not be approached.
- Avatanak Island is highest at its eastern end, where it terminates in a bold cliff; toward the western end, which is low, is a pile of very prominent rocks, resembling a ruined castle. The hills are not rounded like those of Tigalda, but are rugged and torn. The southern shore is apparently safe.
- Rootok Island, lying westward of Avatanak Island and separated from the latter by a foid passage, is high, bold, and abrupt, and about 3 miles long in a general east-northeast and west-southwest direction. The shores of this island are free from outlying dangers.
- Akutan Island is 3,332 feet high. The volcano is a rugged cone, with generally a faint column of smoke issuing from its northeast side near the top. The north side of the island is a fairly regular slope, breaking off at the coast in steep cliffs. The south side is more irregular and the cliffs at the coast are higher and more rocky and broken. In summer the lower parts of the island are grass-covered. Cape Morgan, the southwest point, is high and very bold and precipitous. A shelf of dark rock is at the base of the cliffs, and a reef having three pinnacle rocks above water extends off the cape about 1 mile.
- Unalga Island is comparatively low, with a steep ragged shore line of cliffs surrounded by detached pinnacle rocks. The top of the island is covered with grass and shows up well against the dark hills beyond. There is a reef which extends about 200 yards off the northwest end of the island.
- Gull Rocks lie off the northeast side of Unalga Island. The group consists of four small islets, standing well out of the water and less than 1 mile from Unalga Island. There are many detached rocks in the same group, but not extending beyond the islets into Akutan Pass.
- Egg Island, situated a short distance northward from Biorka Island, is a landmark for Unalga Pass. It is moderately high, rather ragged on top, dark in color, and has a comparatively rounded outline. There is a good passage between the island and Cape Biorka, with a depth of 35 fathoms. When the island bears about southwest by south, a small island, detached from the main island, will open out on its southeastern end. A dark pinnacle rock, showing plainly, lies close to the north end of the island. The shores of the island are free from dangers. The Signals are two low, barren rocks, about 3 miles southward of Egg Island. The channel between them and Biorka Island is clear, with a depth of 10 fathoms. A sunken rock is just outside the Outer Signal. Old Man is a small, square-topped rock, about 60 feet high, lying about 1 mile northwest from Egg Island. There is a low, round-topped rock close to the Old Man. Old Man stands out well clear from Egg Island and, in thick weather, serves as an excellent mark by which to recognize Egg Island. Aleks Rock, on which the sea breaks in a well-defined breaker, is about 20 feet across, and lies with Sannak Peak bearing approximately northeast, distant 19 miles.
