= List of shipwrecks in May 1914 =

The list of shipwrecks in May 1914 includes ships sunk, foundered, grounded, or otherwise lost during May 1914.

== 1 May ==
List of shipwrecks: 1 May 1914
Ship	State	Description
Dollart	Germany	The coaster struck the wreck of Werner (Germany) and sank in the River Elbe at Glückstadt with the loss of two crew. She was later raised, repaired and returned to service.
New Grand Island	United States	The dredger was destroyed by fire at San Francisco, California.

== 3 May ==
List of shipwrecks: 3 May 1914
Ship	State	Description
Columbian	United Kingdom	The cargo ship caught fire in the Atlantic Ocean off Sable Island, Nova Scotia, Canada (41°27′N 59°05′W) and was abandoned by her 49 crew. Thirteen of them were rescued by Seydlitz (Germany), fourteen were rescued by Manhattan (flag unknown). A third lifeboat with sixteen crew was reported to be missing, but was discovered on 17 May by USRC Seneca ( United States Revenue Cutter Service) with just five survivors.

== 4 May ==
List of shipwrecks: 4 May 1914
Ship	State	Description
Emma	United Kingdom	The cargo ship ran aground south of Las Palmas, Canary Islands and sank. She was refloated on 9 May.
Irismere	United Kingdom	The cargo ship was severely damaged by fire at Penang, Malaya and was scuttled to extinguish the fire. She was refloated on 9 May.
Sahara	United Kingdom	The cargo ship ran aground on Martín García Island, Argentina. She was refloated on 9 May.

== 9 May ==
List of shipwrecks: 9 May 1914
Ship	State	Description
Helga Caroline	United States	During a voyage from Ketchikan to Boca de Quadra, Territory of Alaska, the 16-ton motor vessel was wrecked in fog on the coast of Southeast Alaska in Revillagigedo Channel inside Slate Island (55°05′45″N 131°03′00″W) in the Alexander Archipelago. Her crew of two survived.

== 10 May ==
List of shipwrecks: 10 May 1914
Ship	State	Description
Birtley	United Kingdom	The cargo ship collided in the River Thames at Erith, Kent, England, with the cargo ship Storm Force (United Kingdom). She was beached but was refloated the next day.
Storm Force	United Kingdom	The cargo ship collided in the River Thames at Erith, Kent, England, with the cargo ship Birtley (United Kingdom). She was beached but was refloated later that day.

== 11 May ==
List of shipwrecks: 11 May 1914
Ship	State	Description
Agnes Craig	United Kingdom	The schooner struck The Manacles and was consequently beached at Falmouth, Cornwall.
Henrika	Germany	The schooner foundered in the North Sea off Aberdeen, United Kingdom of Great Britain and Ireland with the loss of one of her four crew. The survivors were rescued by the trawler Desiree (United Kingdom).

== 13 May ==
List of shipwrecks: 13 May 1914
Ship	State	Description
Turret Hill	United Kingdom	The coaster sprang a leak and capsized in the North Sea off Lowestoft, Suffolk with the loss of twelve of her fourteen crew. The survivors were rescued by Kremlin (Belgium) and Wearside (United Kingdom).
W. W. Jones	United Kingdom	The pilot cutter collided with Star of New Zealand (United Kingdom) in the Bristol Channel and sank with the loss of five of her 21 crew.
Yewdale	United Kingdom	The cargo ship was driven ashore on West Mouse, Anglesey. Her crew were rescued. She was refloated on 21 May.

== 14 May ==
List of shipwrecks: 14 May 1914
Ship	State	Description
Paramita	United States	Carrying between 164 and 169 people and a cargo of 1,800 tons of general merchandise including cannery supplies, coal, machinery, and pilings, the 1,582-gross register ton, 164-foot (50.0 m) or 216.6-foot (66.0 m) bark struck a rock in the Krenitzin Islands – either on the southeast end of Rootok Island or off the southeast end of Ugamak Island, according to different wreck reports – in the eastern portion of the Fox Islands group of the eastern Aleutian Islands during a gale and was beached in a sinking condition in Lost Harbor (54°13′45″N 165°36′30″W) on Akun Island, becoming a total loss. All on board survived and were rescued by the revenue cutters USRC Tahoma and USRC Unalga (both United States Revenue Cutter Service).

== 15 May ==
List of shipwrecks: 15 May 1914
Ship	State	Description
Times	Norway	The cargo ship ran aground on the Pickel Reef, in the Atlantic Ocean off the coast of Florida, United States. She was refloated on 18 April.

== 17 May ==
List of shipwrecks: 17 May 1914
Ship	State	Description
Tore Jarl	Norway	The cargo liner ran aground in the North Sea off the Lista Lighthouse. Her passengers were taken off. She was declared a total loss. She was refloated on 18 June.

== 19 May ==
List of shipwrecks: 19 May 1914
Ship	State	Description
Paramita	United States	The barque was beached in Lost Harbour whilst on a voyage from San Francisco, California to Bristol Bay, Alaska.

== 20 May ==
List of shipwrecks: 20 May 1914
Ship	State	Description
Doris M. Pickup	United Kingdom	The schooner was driven ashore and wrecked at St. Jago, Cape Verde Islands, Portugal. Her crew were rescued.
El Dorado	Russia	The cargo ship came ashore in America Bay. She was refloated on 23 May.
Gloria	Sweden	The cargo ship caught fire off Malmö and was scuttled.

== 21 May ==
List of shipwrecks: 21 May 1914
Ship	State	Description
Atlantis	Norway	The passenger ship ran aground in the Gulf of Mexico 100 nautical miles (190 km) off Tampico, Mexico. The battleship USS Connecticut (United States Navy) rescued 100 passengers. She was refloated on 26 May.
Pandora	United States	The 8-gross register ton, 31.6-foot (9.6 m) motor vessel was wrecked during a gale in a cove on Unalaska Island in the Aleutian Islands approximately 6 nautical miles (11 km; 6.9 mi) from Biorka Pass (53°49′50″N 166°12′30″W). Her crew of two survived.

== 22 May ==
List of shipwrecks: 22 May 1914
Ship	State	Description
Svenor	Norway	The barque was abandoned in the Southern Ocean off the west coast of Tasmania whilst on a voyage from Fremantle, Western Australia to Newcastle, New South Wales, Australia. Her crew were rescued by Wainui (Australia) and the ship was set afire. It beached at Wreck Bay.
W. H. Gilbert	United States	During a voyage to Green Bay, Wisconsin, with a cargo of coal, the steel-hulled bulk carrier collided with the cargo ship Caldera (United States) in Lake Huron off the coast of Michigan and sank in 255 feet (78 m) of water at 44.836583°N 82.9787°W.

== 23 May ==
List of shipwrecks: 23 May 1914
Ship	State	Description
Septa	Russia	The barque departed Buenos Aires, Argentina. No further trace, presumed foundered with the loss of all hands.

== 24 May ==
List of shipwrecks: 24 May 1914
Ship	State	Description
Berthier	United Kingdom	The coaster was destroyed by fire at Montreal, Quebec, Canada.
Pueyrredon	Argentina	The coaster caught fire at Concepción del Uruguay and was beached.

== 25 May ==
List of shipwrecks: 25 May 1914
Ship	State	Description
Abana	United Kingdom	The schooner foundered in the Atlantic Ocean off Carleton Point, Prince Edward Island, Canada.
Halifax No.19	Canada	The lightship was wrecked at Liscomb, Nova Scotia. Three bodies were recovered by SS Dufferin
W. H. Gilbert	United States	The cargo ship collided with Caldera (United States) and sank in Lake Erie off Cleveland, Ohio.

== 26 May ==
List of shipwrecks: 26 May 1914
Ship	State	Description
Livonia	United Kingdom	The brigantine was wrecked at Cádiz, Spain.

== 27 May ==
List of shipwrecks: 27 May 1914
Ship	State	Description
Emma Southard	United States	The schooner sank in Gardiners Bay, New York.
Pericles	Greece	The cargo ship foundered in the Atlantic Ocean 90 nautical miles (170 km) off Ouessant, Finistère, France. Her crew were rescued.

== 28 May ==
List of shipwrecks: 28 May 1914
Ship	State	Description
Concordia	Denmark	The schooner collided with Cyrus (Russia) in the Baltic Sea and sank. Her crew were rescued by Cyrus.

== 29 May ==
List of shipwrecks: 29 may 1914
Ship	State	Description
Brenhilda	United Kingdom	The full-rigged ship was abandoned in the Atlantic Ocean. She subsequently foundered.
Empress of Ireland	Canada	The ocean liner was rammed by Storstad (Norway) in the Gulf of St Lawrence and sank in 14 minutes with the loss of 1,012 of the 1,477 people on board. See: Sinking of the RMS Empress of Ireland

== 31 May ==
List of shipwrecks: 31 May 1914
Ship	State	Description
Anda	Norway	The barque foundered in the Atlantic Ocean (approximately 42°S 41°W) with the loss of two of her crew.
Frida	Germany	The schooner was driven ashore at Simrishamn, Skåne County, Sweden and sank.
Triton	Russia	The full-rigged ship was abandoned in the Atlantic Ocean (29°53′S 47°24′W). Her crew were rescued by Alexandria (Germany).

== Unknown date ==
List of shipwrecks: Unknown date 1914
Ship	State	Description
Marie Amélie	France	The schooner foundered in the Atlantic Ocean (44°36′N 48°30′W) due to field ice some time between 11 and 19 May. Her crew were rescued by Corinthian (United Kingdom) and the fishing vessel St. Mathurin (France).
F. J. Luckenach	United States	The cargo ship foundered in the Atlantic Ocean off the coast of South Carolina sometime between 15 and 28 May with the loss of all 28 crew.
Santee No. 12	United States	The scow sank off Thompkinsville, New York, Staten Island. The wreck was removed in June.
Torridge	United Kingdom	The cargo ship ran aground at Port Eads, Louisiana, United States in late May. She was refloated on 4 June,
