= Pustoi Island =

Island in Alaska, United States

Pustoi Island (Taĝilgadax in Aleut) (53°23′43″N 167°49′31″W) is an island in the Fox Islands group of the eastern Aleutian Islands, Alaska. It is 0.3 miles across and is located in Umnak Pass 2 mi north of Ship Rock off the northeast coast of Umnak Island. The name is derived from the Russian "Ostrov Pustoy," meaning "desert island," a name given to it by navigator Peter Kuzmich Krenitzin and published by Captain Tebenkov in 1852.
