= Derbin Island =

Island in Alaska, United States

Derbin
- Location within Alaska

Geography
- Location: Northern Pacific Ocean
- Coordinates: 54°04′16″N 165°09′12″W
- Archipelago: Aleutian Islands
- Length: 0.840 km (0.522 mi)
- Highest elevation: 10 ft (3 m)

Administration
- United States
- State: Alaska
- Borough: Fox Islands

Demographics
- Population: Uninhabited

Derbin Island is located in the Krenitzin Islands, a subgroup of the Fox Islands in the eastern Aleutian Islands, Alaska, United States. Derbin is a small island (at 0.5 mi across) and is situated near the southwestern shore of Tigalda Island. It is measuring 840 metres (0.52 mi) long and 204 metres (0.127 mi) wide. It was named in 1935 by the United States Coast and Geodetic Survey because of its proximity to Derbin Strait, the channel between Avatanak and Tigalda islands. Derbin Strait, in turn, is derived from "Derbenskoy," the Russian name published by Father Veniaminov (1840).
