= Krenitsyn =

Krenitsyn, spelt Krenitzin in the United States, may refer to:

- Pyotr Krenitsyn, a Russian explorer and Captain/Lieutenant of the Imperial Russian Navy
- The highest peak on Onekotan Island, located in the midst of the Tao-Rusyr Caldera
- The Krenitzin Islands in Alaska
- Cape Krenitzin at the SW end of the Alaska Peninsula
