= Round Island (Aleutian Islands) =

Round Island (Imlichin in Aleut) is a 0.1-mile-wide (160 m) island in the Krenitzin Islands, a subgroup of the Fox Islands group of the Aleutian Islands in the U.S. state of Alaska. It is located 0.5 miles (800 m) south of Ugamak Island at 54°11′58″N 164°46′33″W. It is also known as "Walrus Island" due to its large population of Pacific Walrus and also because it is not round.
