= Akutan =

Akutan may refer to:

- Akutan, Alaska
- Mount Akutan
- Akutan Island
- USS Akutan (AE-13)
- Akutan Zero
- A nickname for Minato Aqua, a VTuber from Hololive Production

== See also ==
- Accutane, a skin medication
