= Akporvik Hill =

Mountain summit in the state of Alaska

- Location within Alaska

Highest point
- Elevation: 625 ft (191 m)
- Prominence: 258 ft (79 m)
- Coordinates: 68°54′26″N 164°26′38″W

Geography
- Location: North Slope Borough, Alaska, United States
- Parent range: De Long Mountains
- Topo map: USGS De Long Mountains

Akporvik Hill is a summit in North Slope Borough, Alaska, in the United States. Akporvik Hill is located South of Agiak Lagoon, near the Chukchi Sea coast, between Mutaktuk Creek and Pitmegea River, 36 miles northwest of Mount Kelly.

Akporvik is derived from an Eskimo word meaning "racetrack" or "runway".
