= Pancake Rock =

Island in the United States of America

Coordinates: 52°55′50″N 169°02′27″W

Location in Alaska

Pancake Rock is an island in the Fox Islands group in the eastern Aleutian Islands, Alaska. It is approximately 2,000 feet (610 m) across and is located about 1.9 miles (3.1 km) off the west coast of Umnak Island.

The island is said to resemble a stack of pancakes, hence the name.
