= Aiktak Island =

Alaskan island in the Bering Sea

Coordinates: 54°11′01″N 164°49′41″W

Location in Alaska

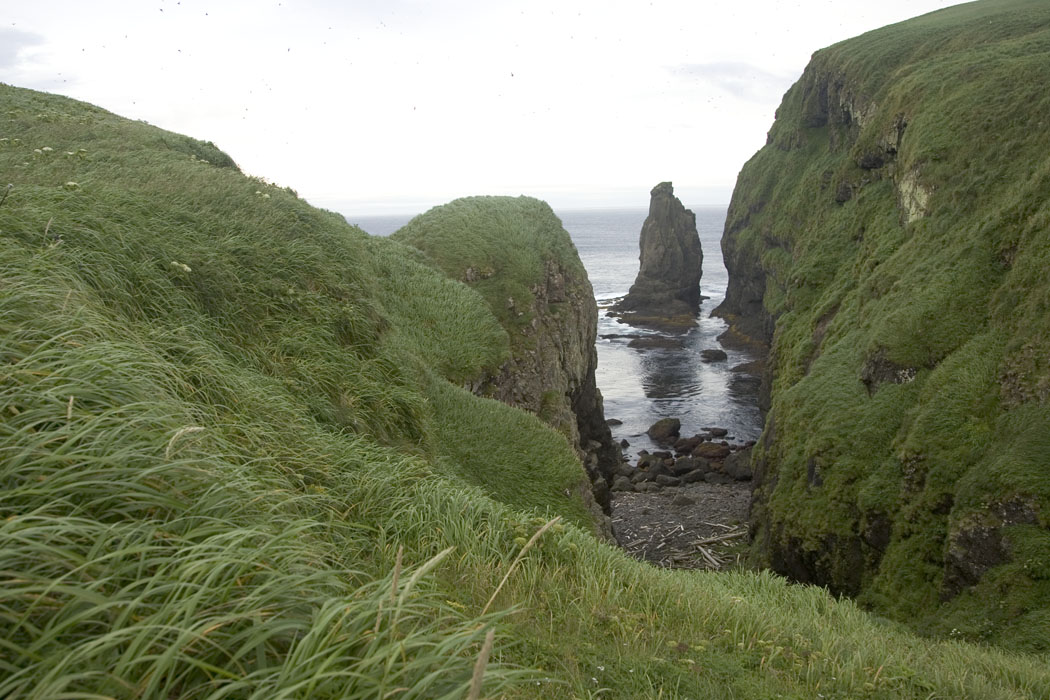
Aiktak Island beach

Aiktak Island (Aleut: Ugangax) is one of the Krenitzin Islands, a subgroup of the Fox Islands in the eastern Aleutian Islands in the U.S. state of Alaska. It is 1.3 miles (2.1 km) long and is located 38 miles (61 km) east of Akutan Island. Aiktak is an Aleut name transcribed by Captain Tebenkov in 1852 as "Ostrov Aikhtak." R.H. Geoghegan suggested that the name is derived from the Aleut "aikhag", meaning "travel or going on a voyage". It is also known as Ashmiak.
