= Avatanak Island =

Island in Alaska, United States

Coordinates: 54°04′18″N 165°18′14″W

Location in Alaska

Avatanak Island (Aleut: Agutanax̂; Russian: Аватанак) is the second-largest (with a length of 10 mi) of the Krenitzin Islands, a subgroup of the Fox Islands in the eastern Aleutian Islands in the U.S. state of Alaska. It lies southeast of Akun Island, across the Avatanak Strait. Within the Krenitzin Islands, it lies between Rootok Island (Aayux̂tax̂) to the west, and Tigalda Island to the east.

Avatanak is an Aleut name transcribed by Russian explorers into various spellings and apparently identical with Aiaialgutak of Captain Lt. Krenitzin and Lt. Levashev (1768). The name Avatanak was published by Father Veniaminov (1840) and Captain Tebenkov (1852), whereas Captain Lutke and the Russian Hydrographic Department (1847) used the spelling Avatanok. Avatanak Strait separates Avatanak from Akun Island to the northwest, and Avatanak Bight is a bay on the southeastern coast of Avatanak.
