= Egg Island (Alaska) =

Island in Alaska, United States

Coordinates: 53°51′46″N 166°02′38″W

Location in Alaska

Egg Island (Aleut: Ugalĝa; Sugpiaq: Qangyutilim Qikertaa) is a small island in the Fox Islands subgroup of the Aleutian Islands in the U.S. state of Alaska. It lies off the eastern end of Unalaska Island and just off the northeastern tip of Sedanka Island. It is the easternmost island in the Aleutians West Census Area of Alaska. The island has a land area of 311.12 acres (1.2591 km^{2}) and is uninhabited.

Its present name is a translation of the Russian name given by Lt. Sarichev (1826, map 14, dated 1792) of the Imperial Russian Navy. Sarichev named it "Ostrov Yaichnoy," meaning "Island of Egg." Sarichev also called the island "Ostrov Ugalgan" or "Ugalgan Island ," probably from Capt. Lt. Krenitzin, IRN, 1768 (Coxe, 1787, Chart 2)
