= Unalga Island (Fox Islands) =

Island in the Fox Islands

Coordinates: 53°58′35″N 166°08′39″W

Location in Alaska

Unalga Island (Aleut: Unalĝa) is one of the Fox Islands subgroup of the Aleutian Islands of southwestern Alaska, United States. It lies just northeast of Unalaska Island and across Akutan Pass from Akutan Island to its northeast. It is the westernmost island in the Aleutians East Borough. Unalga Island has a land area of 11.004 square miles (28.50 square kilometres) and is unpopulated. The island is 6.7 kilometres (4.2 mi) long and 8.2 kilometres (5.1 mi) wide.
