= Mutaktuk Creek =

Stream in Alaska

Coordinates: 68°55′11″N 164°24′53″W

Mutaktuk Creek is a stream in North Slope Borough, Alaska, in the United States. It flows to the Chukchi Sea. Akporvik Hill marks the north western end of its watershed with the neighboring Pitmegea River basin.

Mutaktuk is derived from an Eskimo word meaning "no parka".

== See also ==
- List of rivers of Alaska
