= Akutan Hot Springs =

Thermal springs

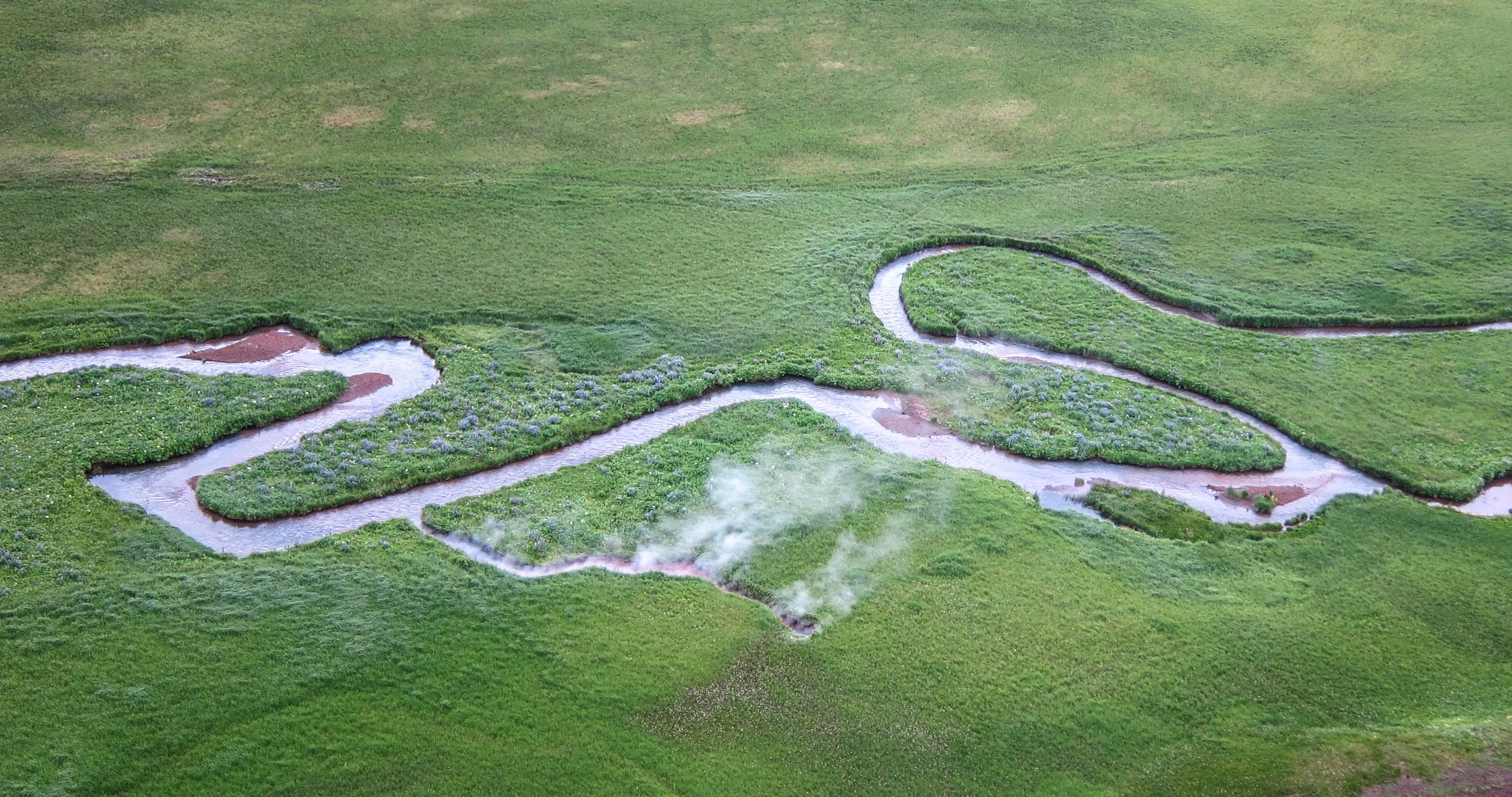
- hot spring discharging into Hot Springs Creek
- Interactive map of Akutan Hot Springs
- Location: Akutan Island, Aleutian Islands, Alaska
- Coordinates: 54°9′N 165°53′W
- Type: volcanic
- Temperature: 77 °C (171 °F)

Akutan Hot Springs is a system of several dozen thermal springs and a geyser in the Akutan geothermal area, Akutan Island, Alaska.

== Location ==
The Akutan geothermal area is located in the Aleutian Islands; the hot springs are scattered across multiple locations. They discharge into the bay from various local streams and groundwater. Akutan Peak is a stratovolcano with a summit caldera. The active hot springs are located at the head of the valley and the shore of Hot Springs Bay. There are five groupings of geothermal springs in the lower Hot Springs Bay Valley (HSBV) geothermal area.

== Water profile ==
The water emerges from the springs at 77 °C (171 °F) and discharges into Hot Springs Creek and other streams. The geothermally heated water emerges from beach sands, fissures in hydrothermally cemented stream bank sediments, from pools in the alluvium and directly into the creek.

== See also ==
- List of hot springs in the United States
- List of hot springs in the world
