= Baird Inlet =

Coordinates: 60°48′32″N 164°05′21″W

Baird Inlet (Central Yupik: Nanvaruk, literally ‘big lake’) is a 35-mile (56 km) long bay in the Yukon-Kuskokwim Delta in the State of Alaska in the United States. It borders Nelson Island and is drained primarily by the Ninglick and Kolavinarak Rivers.

The Russian-born soldier, writer, and translator Ivan Petrof (1842?–1896) named the inlet for the American naturalist, ornithologist, ichthyologist, herpetologist, and museum curator Spencer Fullerton Baird (1823–1887) in 1880. The Alaskan native name for it is "Nunavarok" according to a 1949 United States Coast and Geodetic Survey report.
