= Ningaluk River =

Ninglick River
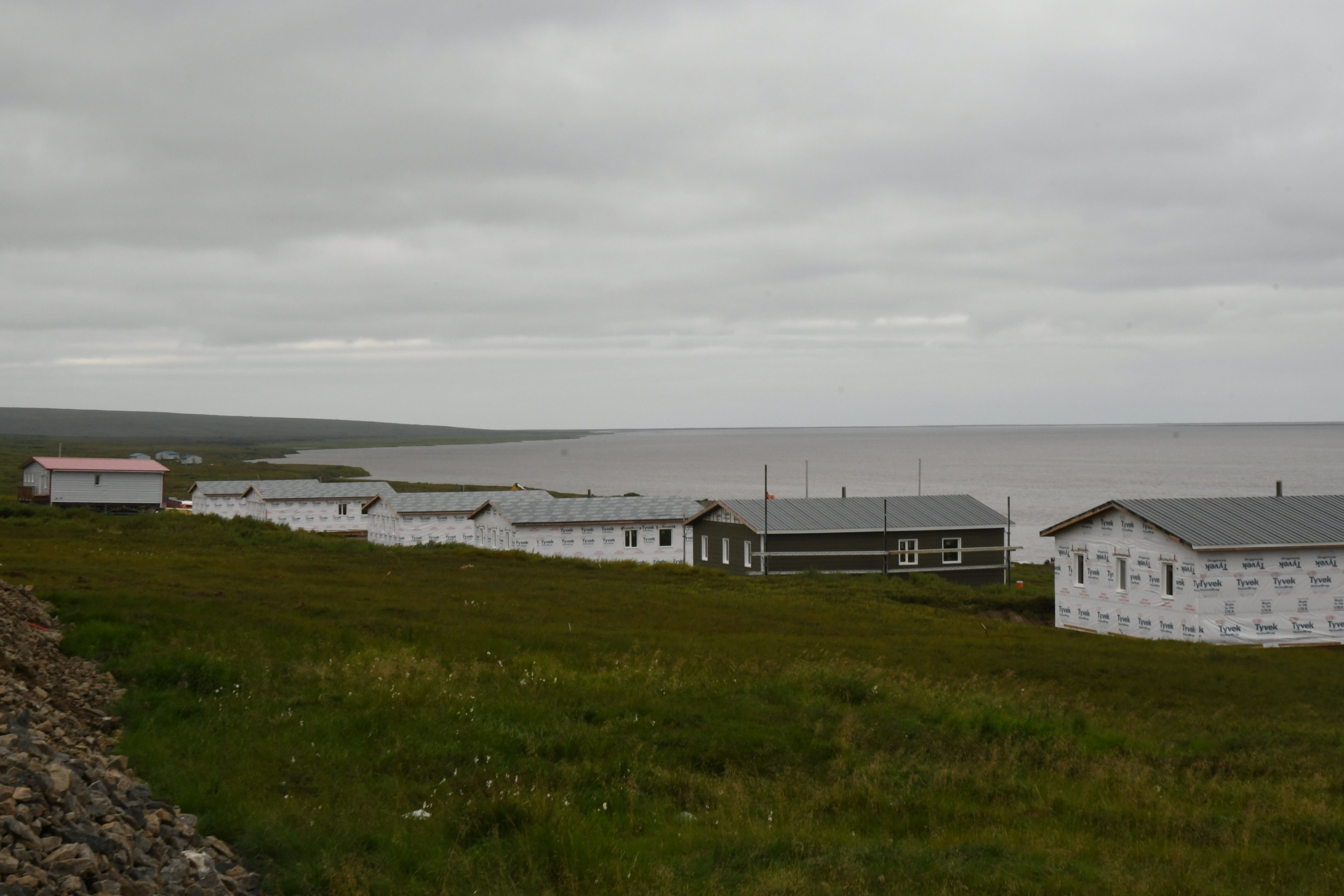

- Location of the mouth of the Ninglick River in Alaska

Location
- Country: United States
- State: Alaska
- Census Area: Bethel

Physical characteristics
- Source: Baird Inlet
  - location: north of Kigigak Island
  - coordinates: 60°50′22″N 164°26′39″W
- Mouth: Hazen Bay
  - coordinates: 60°53′18″N 165°01′07″W
  - elevation: 0 ft (0 m)
- Length: 44 mi (71 km)

Ningaluk River (also Ninglick River) (Ningliq in Yup'ik) is a channel, 44 miles (71 km) long, between Baird Inlet and Hazen Bay on the west coast of the U.S. state of Alaska. Flowing generally west, it enters the bay north of Kigigak Island. The bay, about 110 miles (180 km) west of Bethel, is on the Bering Sea.

The U.S. Marine Corps has been working to create emergency shelter, roads, homes, and an airfield in nearby Mertarvik for 400 Yupik Eskimo displaced from Newtok along the Ninglick River. The federal government is supporting the 9-mile (14 km) move, which is necessitated by erosion, melting, and the sinking of permafrost at Newtok.

== See also ==
- List of rivers of Alaska
