= Agiak Lagoon =

Lake in the state of Alaska, United States

- Location within Alaska Location within North America
- Location: North Slope Borough, Alaska
- Coordinates: 68°55′N 164°30′W
- Type: Lake
- Surface elevation: 3 feet (0.91 m)

Agiak Lagoon is a lake in North Slope Borough, Alaska, in the United States. The name Agiak, derived from an Eskimo word meaning "file", was applied to the lagoon because it contains a bar which resembles a file.
