= Amak Island =

Island in Alaska, United States

Coordinates: 55°25′06″N 163°08′38″W

Location in Alaska

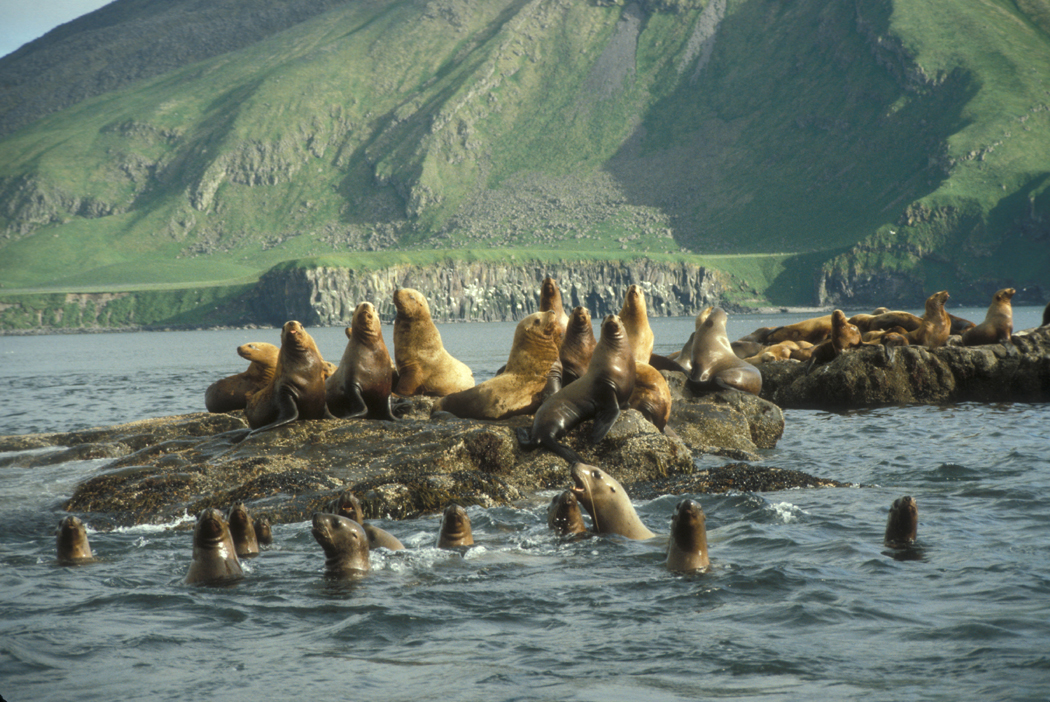
Amak Island, Steller sea lion haul out

Amak Island (Aleut: Amax; Russian: Амак) is an uninhabited island in Aleutians East Borough, Alaska, United States. The island lies north of the western tip of the Alaska Peninsula, and northwest of the mainland city of Cold Bay. The island's land area is 5.828 square miles (15.09 km^{2}) and its maximum elevation is 1,601 feet (488 m). The island's volcano, Mount Amak, last erupted in 1796.

The local population of the song sparrow was last seen on the island around New Year's Eve, 1980/1981, and has not been seen since; devegetation of the island played a part in its demise. These birds were formerly considered a separate subspecies, Melospiza melodia amaka, but are now considered to fall into the range of variation of the Aleutian song sparrow (M. m. sanaka). Unconfirmed reports from the late 1980s suggest that the island, should habitat quality improve, would in time be recolonized by the species.
