= SS Dufferin =

1905 coastal steamship

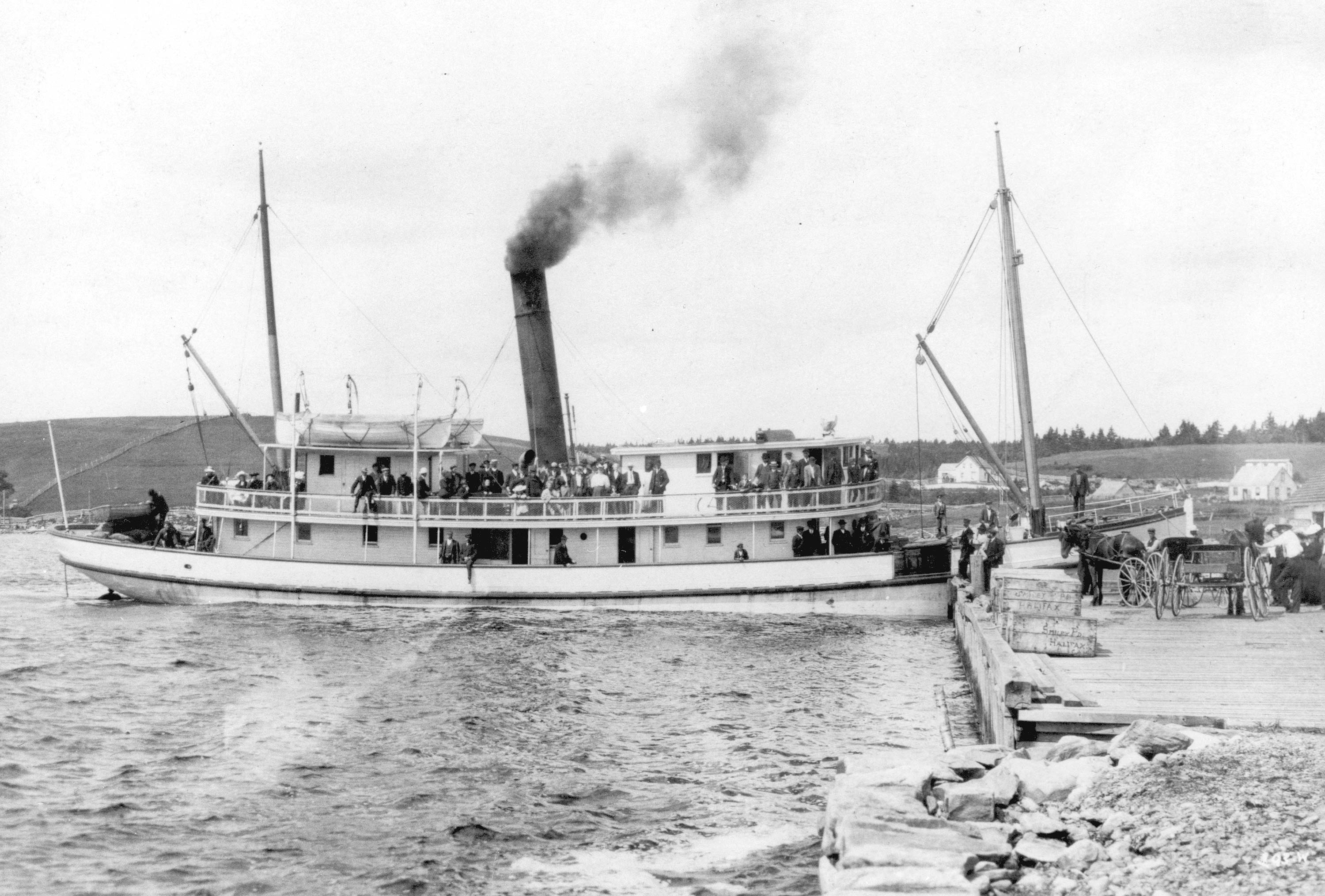
- Dufferin at the Government Wharf, Port Dufferin, with Smiley & Company's Lobster Crates awaiting Transport to Halifax, ca. 1910

History

- Name: SS Dufferin
- Operator: William A. & William J. Murdock
- Port of registry: Yarmouth, transferred to Halifax
- Route: Halifax to Sherbrooke
- Builder: Joseph McGill
- Completed: 14 April 1905
- In service: 14 April 1905
- Out of service: 31 December 1937
- Identification: Official number: 116896
- Fate: Dismantled

SS Dufferin was a coastal steamship built by Joseph McGill of Shelburne, Nova Scotia on April 14, 1905. Originally owned by New Burrell Johnson Iron Co Ltd., Yarmouth, Nova Scotia, she was sold to sea merchants William A. Murdock and William J. Murdock of Sherbrooke, Nova Scotia on the same day. Under the Murdoch’s command the Dufferin served as a passenger and cargo ship between Halifax and Sherbrooke. The Dufferin steamed along coastal communities until the Hochelaga Shipping and Towing Co. Ltd. dismantled her up in 1938. Transport Canada closed the Dufferin's registry on December 31, 1937.

== Ship description ==
Dufferin was 108.0 ft (length from fore part of stem, under the bowsprit, to the aft side of the head of the stern post), 25.0 ft (main breadth to outside of plating), 8.6 ft (depth in hold from tonnage deck to ceiling at midships), and 28.0 ft (length of engine room). Dufferin had a gross tonnage of 210.57 and a registered tonnage of 98.93. She was equipped with a Scottish compound surface condensing engine 0.20 Cylinder. 15” & 32” – 24” 42 N.H.P. (nominal horsepower). Additionally, Dufferin had two masts with auxiliary schooner rigging to supplement the steam engine. Furthermore, she had wooden framework with a carvel build, and an elliptical stern.

== Service history ==
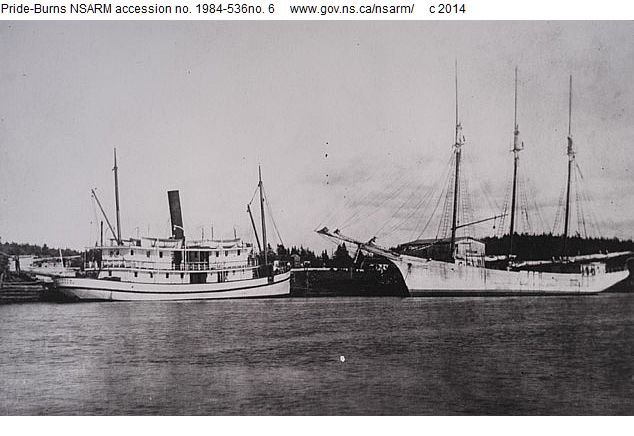
SS Dufferin and a three-masted schooner at Anderson's wharf, Sherbrooke

Dufferin was captained by Charley and William Murdock and traveled the eastern shore route. She was reputed as being "...the Cleanest and best painted coastal boat coming into Halifax." The Dufferin "...sail[ed] for Plant Wharf every Thursday at ten o’clock p.m. for Sherbrooke, calling at Port Dufferin, Moser River, Ecum Secum, Marie Joseph, Liscomb, and Sonora.” The Dufferin supplied the small coastal ports with feed, kerosene, and groceries, while returning to Halifax with items such as lumber and lobsters. Due to ice build-up during January, February, and March the Dufferin would be unable to travel to the small coastal ports. However, "...occasionally they would sail south to warm water ports for cargoes such as sugar cane, which would be then shipped to Halifax."

== Shipwreck Assistance ==
=== Lightship No. 19 ===
While off the coast of Liscomb, Nova Scotia, on May 23, 1914, Lightship No. 19, the newly built Halifax lightvessel encountered dense fog on her delivery voyage to Halifax. Unable to the see the rocky seascape, the lightvessel was driven into a rock ledge and battered by the incoming waves. During the Dufferin's coastal run, at 8:30 a.m Captain Murdock "...saw pieces of wood, bodies, and wreckage floating in the water ahead. Three bodies wearing life jackets were pulled from the water." Captain Murdock used the ship's wireless to report the wreck. Both the CGS Stanley and CGS Lady Laurier responded to the call.

=== City of Sydney ===
On March 18, 1914, Captain William Murdock Jr. of the SS Dufferin, came to assistance of the ship City of Sydney, at Sambro Island at the entrance to Halifax Harbour. The crew of the City of Sydney attempted to load their cargo onto the Dufferin, however, a “…large wave capsized one of the freight-carrying dories. Subsequently, two men Robert Snow and Daniel Burns lost their lives.”

=== Additional Information ===
The Murdock's were not the only owners of the SS Dufferin. According to the Transport Offices in Ottawa, the Dufferin appears in forty-two transactions before being dismantled on December 31, 1937. However, most of the accounts, references, and data that have been collected focus on the Murdoch's ownership of the Dufferin. A majority of the owners of the "Dufferin" are unknown.
