= Talachulitna River =

- Location of the mouth of the Talachulitna River in Alaska

Location
- Country: United States
- State: Alaska
- Borough: Matanuska-Susitna

Physical characteristics
- Source
  - coordinates: 61°39′46″N 151°12′26″W; Beluga Mountain
  - elevation: 2,350 ft (720 m)
- Mouth
  - coordinates: 61°52′2″N 151°24′51″W; Skwentna River
  - elevation: 259 ft (79 m)
- Length: 45 mi (72 km)

The Talachulitna River is a river in Alaska.

There are also:

- Talachulitna Creek at 61°35′47″N 151°16′31″W Elevation: 679 feet (207 m)
- Talachulitna Lake at 61°34′14″N 151°37′28″W Elevation: 1,070 feet (330 m)

== History ==
Tanaina Indian name spelled "Tu-lu-shu-lit-na" by Lt. J. S. Herron, USA, in 1899.

== Watershed ==
Heads on Beluga Mountain, flows South and North-West 45 miles (72 km) to Skwentna River, 56 miles (90 km) North-West of Tyonek, Alaska.

This river begins at Judd Lake. It is inaccessible by road. And, it has its own support group.

The Talachulitna is popular for fly-in rafting and fishing trips. There are special restrictions on fishing: rainbow trout & steelhead are "catch & release" only and only single-hook lures can be used.

More information is available from a log of a 1976 river resource study for the Alaska State Division of Lands.

=== Tributaries ===
- Talachulitna Creek

== See also ==
- List of rivers of Alaska
