= Ugamak Island =

Island in Alaska

Coordinates: 54°12′44″N 164°49′15″W

Location in Alaska

Ugamak Island (Aleut: Ugangax̂) is one of the Krenitzin Islands, a subgroup of the Fox Islands group of the eastern Aleutian Islands, Alaska. Ugamak is an Aleut word transcribed by Father Veniaminov (1840) which, according to R. H. Geoghegan, may mean "ceremony island". It is 5.9 miles (9.5 km) long and is located 32 miles (51 km) east of Akutan Island. Ugamak Bay is situated on the southeast coast of Ugamak, and Ugamak Strait is a three-mile-wide channel that separates Ugamak from Kaligagan Island to the west.

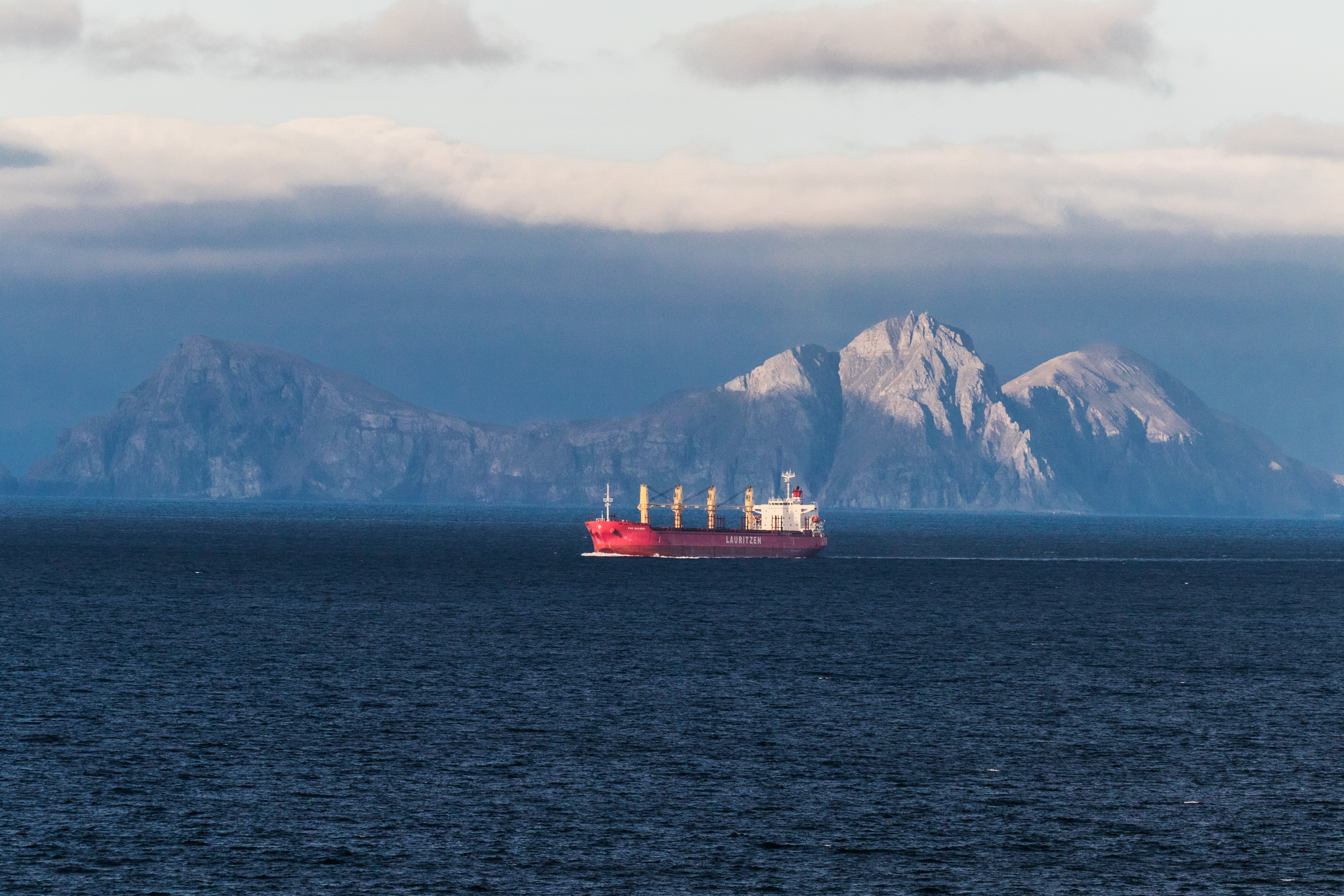
Ugamak Island as seen from the Unimak Pass in morning light.

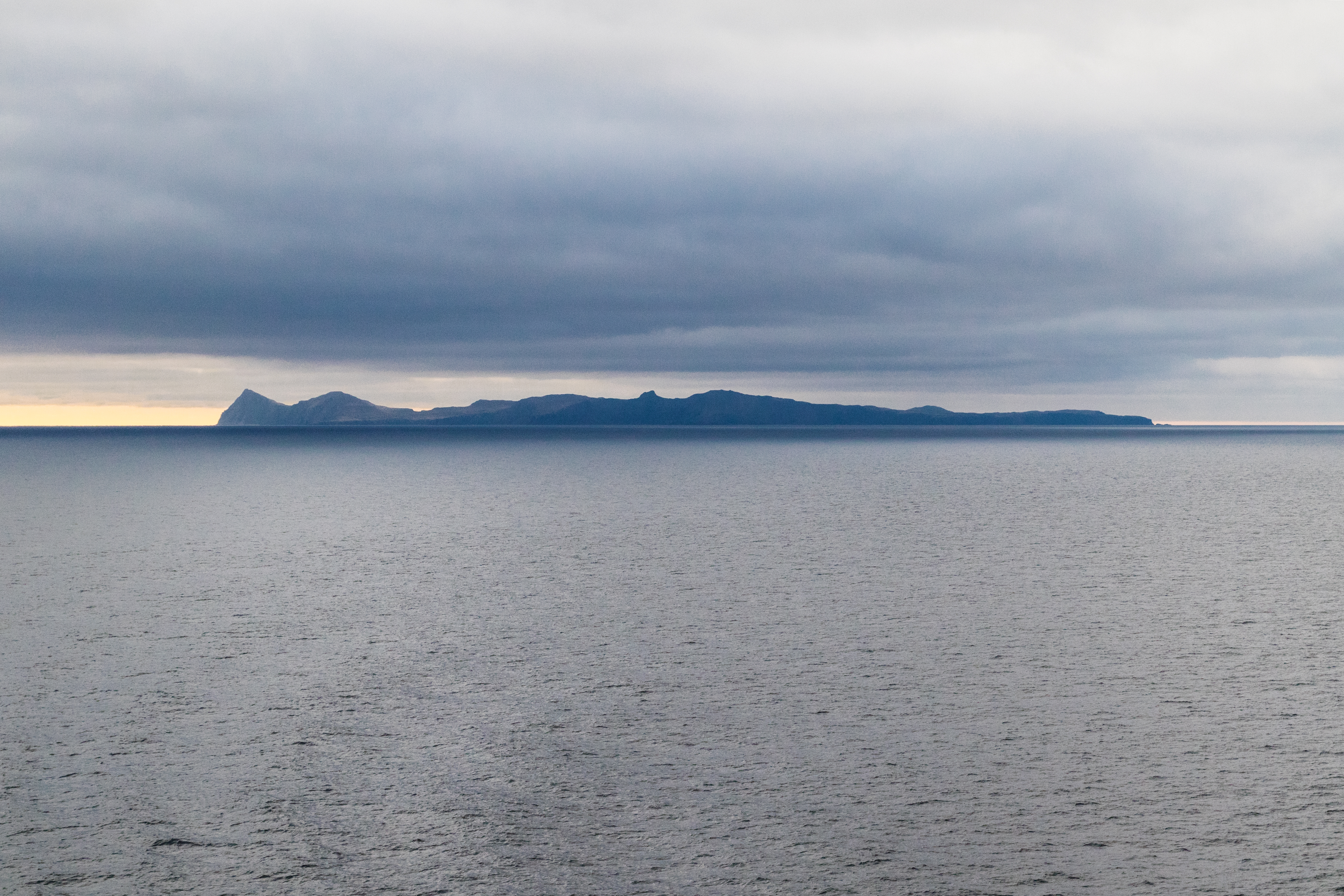
Ugamak Island as seen from the Bering Sea looking east towards Unimak Island. Ugamak is in the foreground and Shishaldin and Isanotski volcanoes on Unimak Island are in the background.
