= Big Koniuji Island (Alaska) =

Island in Alaska, United States

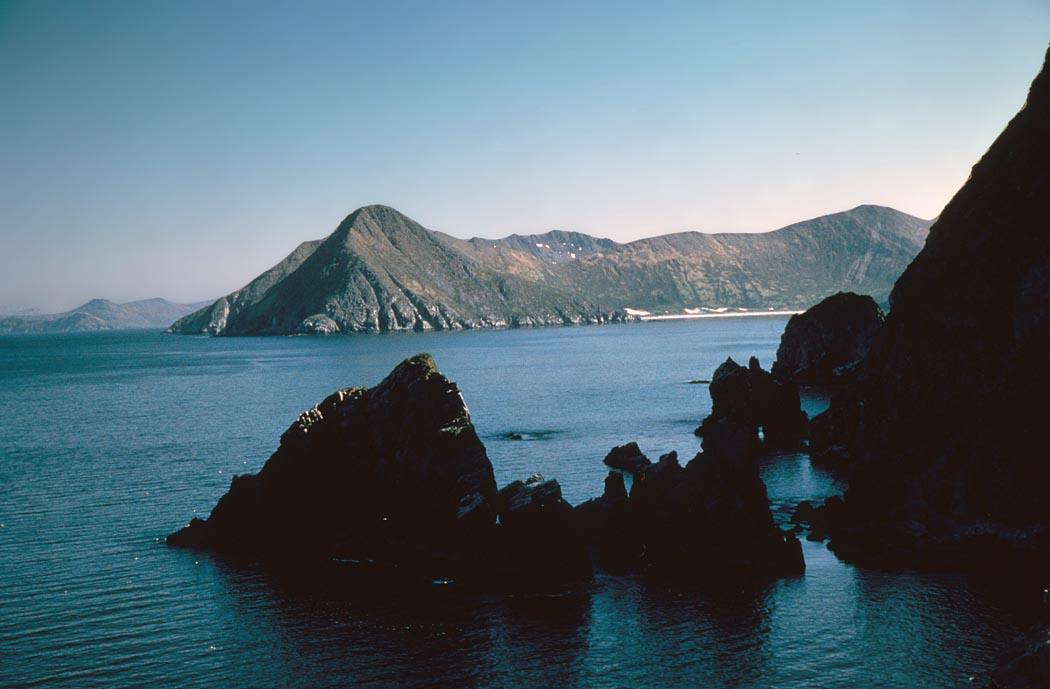
- Interactive map of Big Koniuji Island

Geography
- Location: Gulf of Alaska
- Coordinates: 55°08′13″N 159°32′58″W
- Area: 93 km^{2} (36 sq mi)
- Highest elevation: 863 ft (263 m)
- Highest point: Unnamed mountain 1,878 feet (572 m) high

Administration
- United States
- State: Alaska
- Borough: Aleutians East Borough

Big Koniuji Island (Aleut: Kiuniuiu Tanani or Kunujutanany) is an island located in the Aleutians East Borough, Gulf of Alaska, southwest of mainland Alaska, United States. It is part of the Shumagin Islands, which consist of 20 islands, and lies southeast of Popof Island.

Location in Alaska

== History ==
The island's Aleut name Kiuniuiu Tanani (or Kunujutanany) means Big Crested Auk. It first appeared on the United States Coast Survey charts in 1872.

A man named Oscar Olsen, who was a resident of Unga Island, introduced 13 pairs of red foxes from the Alaska Peninsula to the island in 1916. He originally planned to release an additional 17 pairs the following year. Additionally in 1925, arctic foxes were brought to the island but were quickly eradicated by the more dominant red foxes. The presence of foxes on the island, led to a flourishing fox trapping business which resulted in the construction of five cabins on the island. These cabins were constructed along the bays of Fox Farmers Cove, Long Bay, Alaska Harbor, Stormy Cove and Sandpiper Lagoon, with the main camp being located in Stormy Cove as it was the safest place to reach when arriving by small boat from Sand Point, Alaska. Yukon Harbor saw an additional cabin being constructed by 1935.

In 1986, the US Fish and Wildlife Service exterminated the red foxes from the island. They used traps, snares and rifles to clear the island of foxes as to restore the breeding spots of seabirds. Following the trapping of 84 foxes over a period of 3 months in 1985 and 1986, the island was declared fox-free in 1987 and a gull colony was quickly formed on the island.

== Geography ==
Big Koniuji Island is 15 miles (24 km) in length and has an elevation of 863 feet (263 m), with it highest point being an unnamed mountain standing at a height of 1,878 feet (572 m). It lies at these coordinates: 55°08′13″N 159°32′58″W and has a size of 93 Square kilometre. The island lies Southeast of Popof Island, where the closest city Sand Point is also located. The island is part of the Northeast Aleutian Range.

== Climate ==
Climate data for Cold Bay Airport
Month	Jan	Feb	Mar	Apr	May	Jun	Jul	Aug	Sep	Oct	Nov	Dec	Year
Mean daily maximum °F (°C)	32.8 (0.4)	32.3 (0.2)	35.1 (1.7)	38.2 (3.4)	44.9 (7.2)	50.8 (10.4)	55.1 (12.8)	56.2 (13.4)	52.5 (11.4)	45.0 (7.2)	39.1 (3.9)	35.5 (1.9)	43.1 (6.2)
Mean daily minimum °F (°C)	23.5 (−4.7)	22.9 (−5.1)	24.9 (−3.9)	28.8 (−1.8)	34.8 (1.6)	41.1 (5.1)	46.1 (7.8)	47.4 (8.6)	43.0 (6.1)	35.1 (1.7)	29.9 (−1.2)	26.5 (−3.1)	33.7 (0.9)
Average precipitation inches (mm)	3.08 (78)	2.59 (66)	2.48 (63)	2.30 (58)	2.65 (67)	2.89 (73)	2.53 (64)	3.59 (91)	4.51 (115)	4.54 (115)	4.79 (122)	4.33 (110)	40.28 (1,022)

Big Koniuji Island
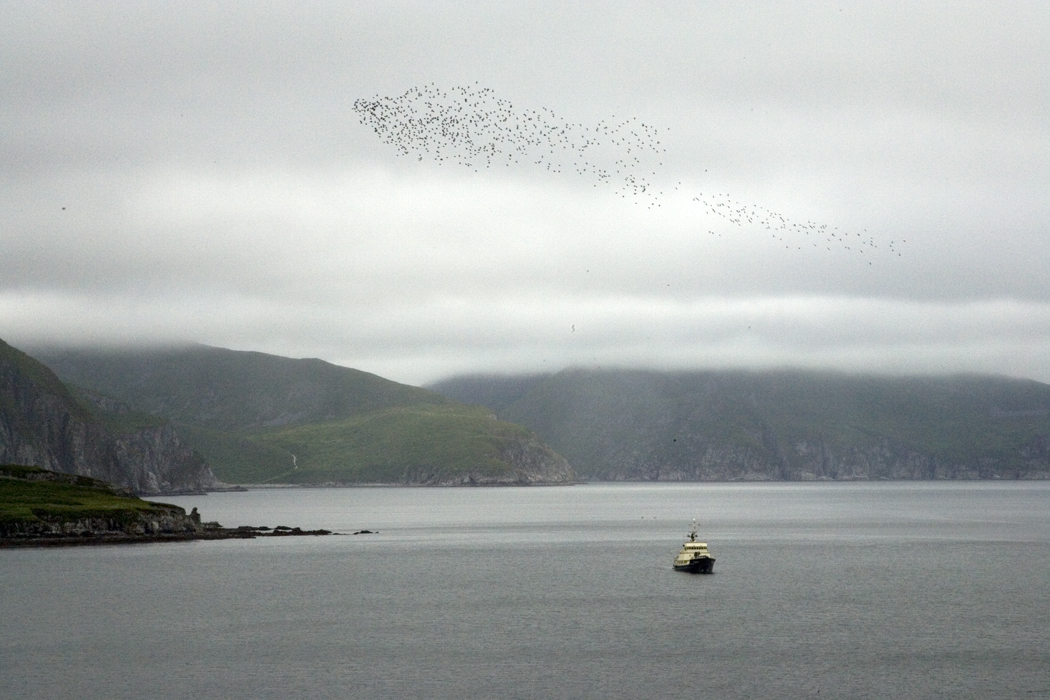
Big Koniuji Island alongside MV Tiglax

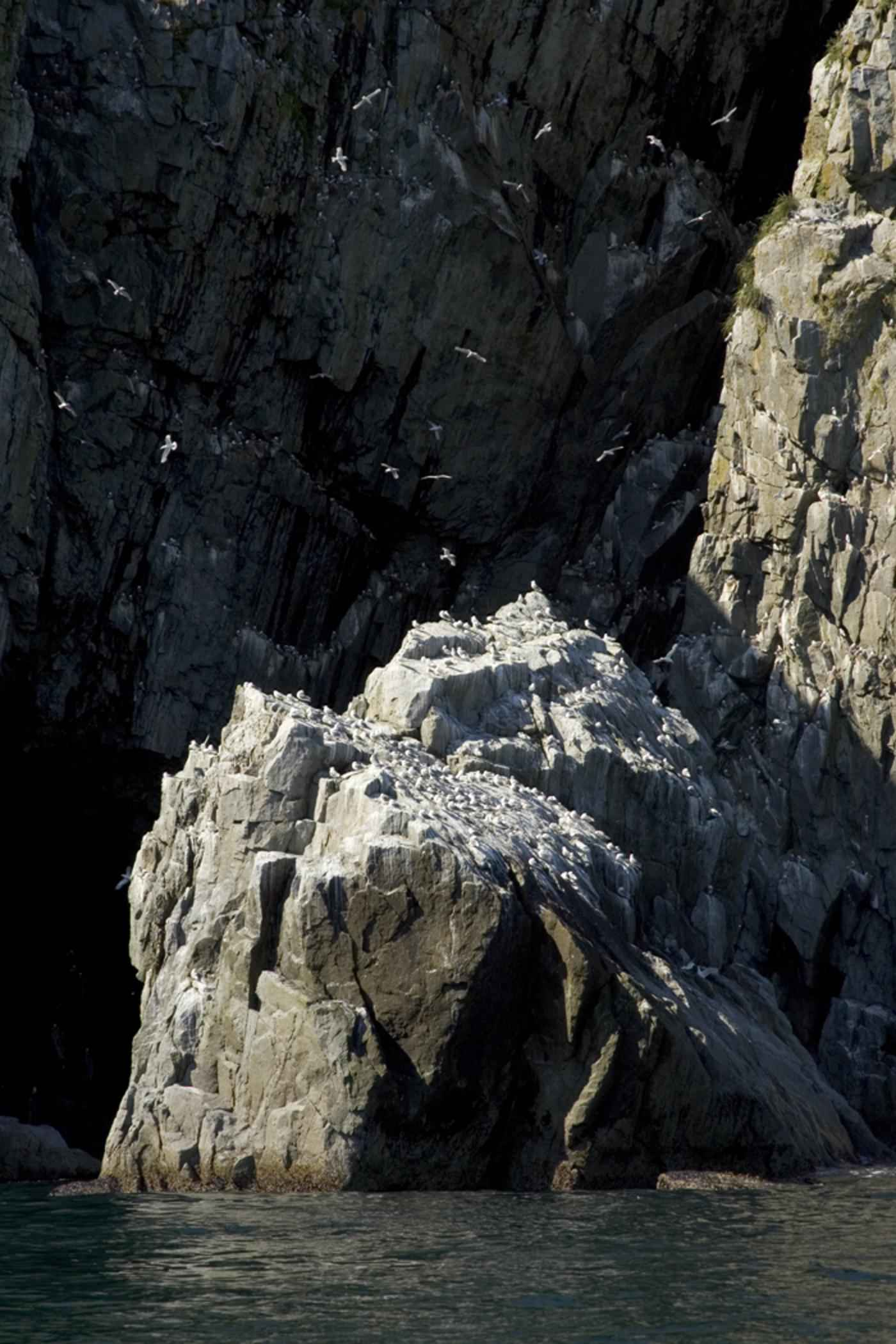
The bird cliffs of Big Koniuji Island

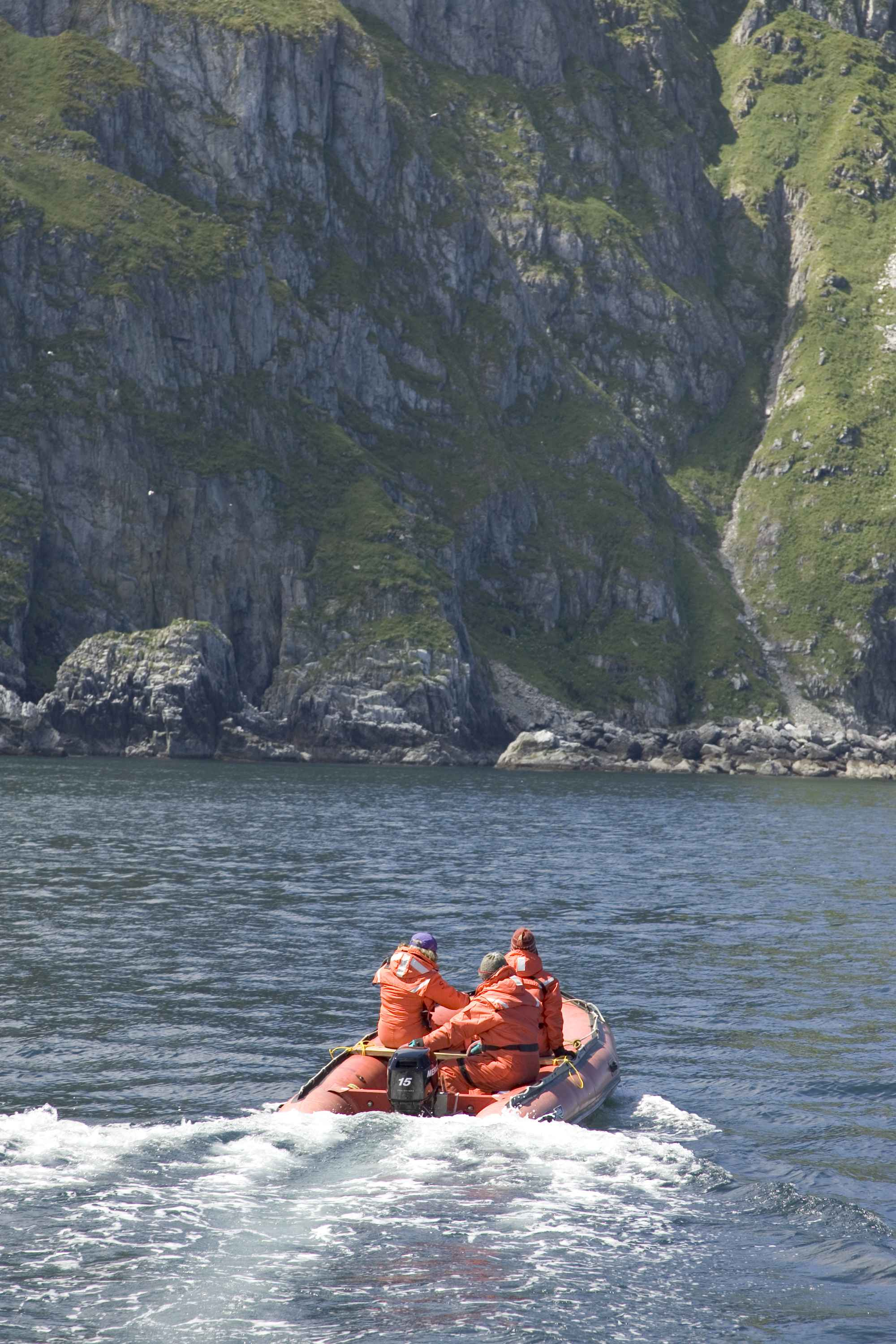
Boat sailing towards Big Koniuji Island

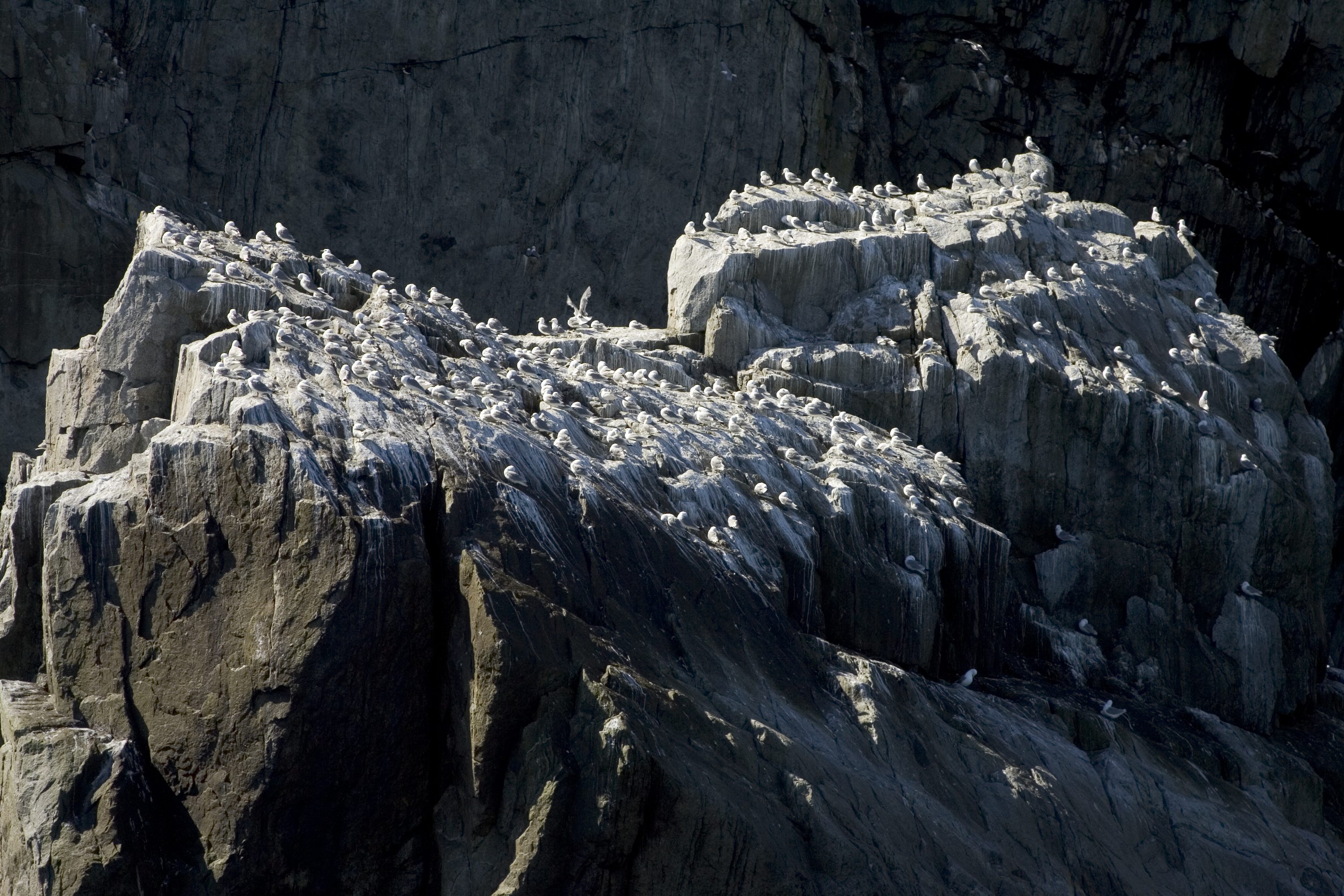
A black-legged Kittiwake colony on the cliffs of the island

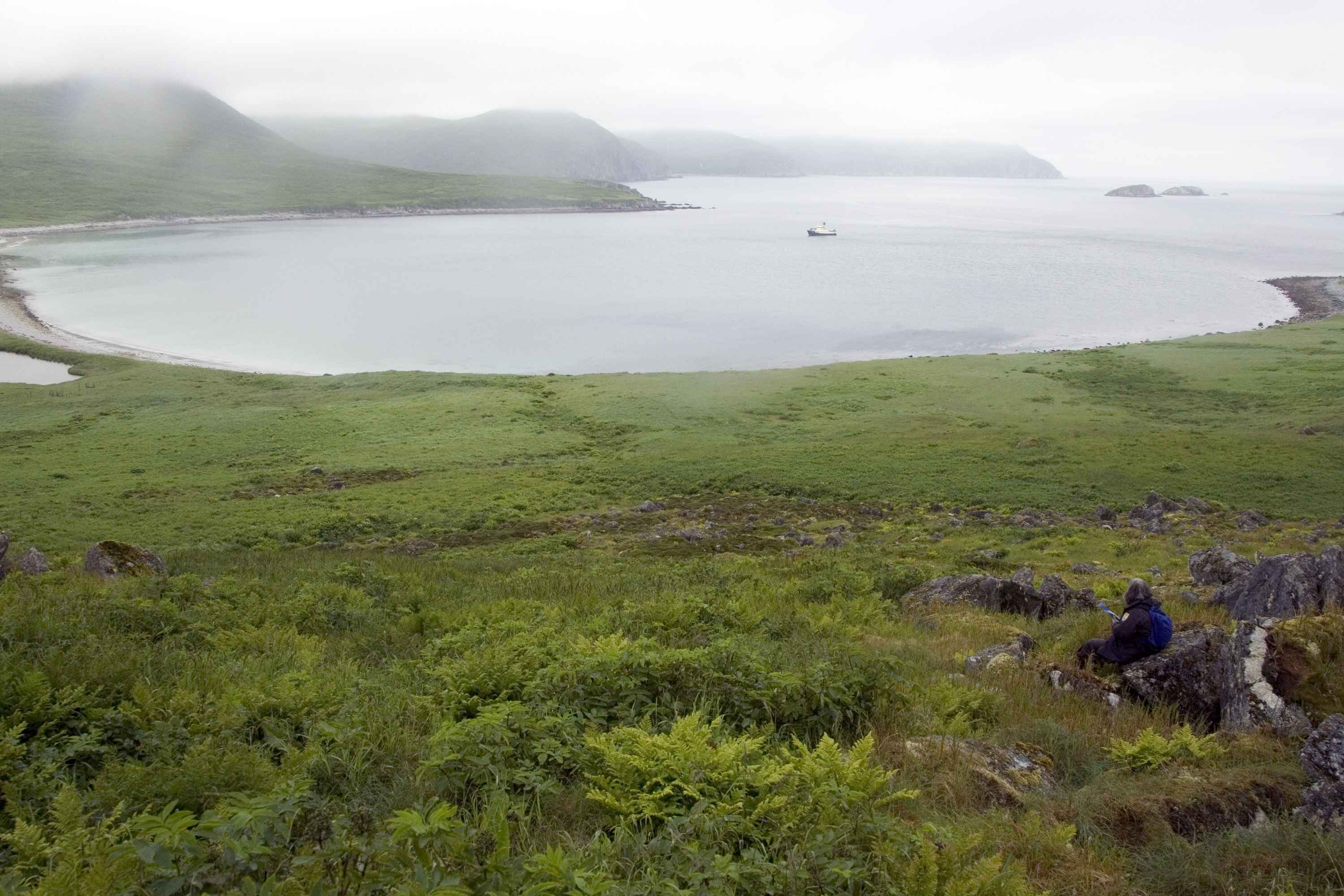
Big Koniuji Island shoreline

== See also ==
- List of islands of Alaska
