= Hazen Bay =

Coordinates: 61°01′00″N 165°20′00″W

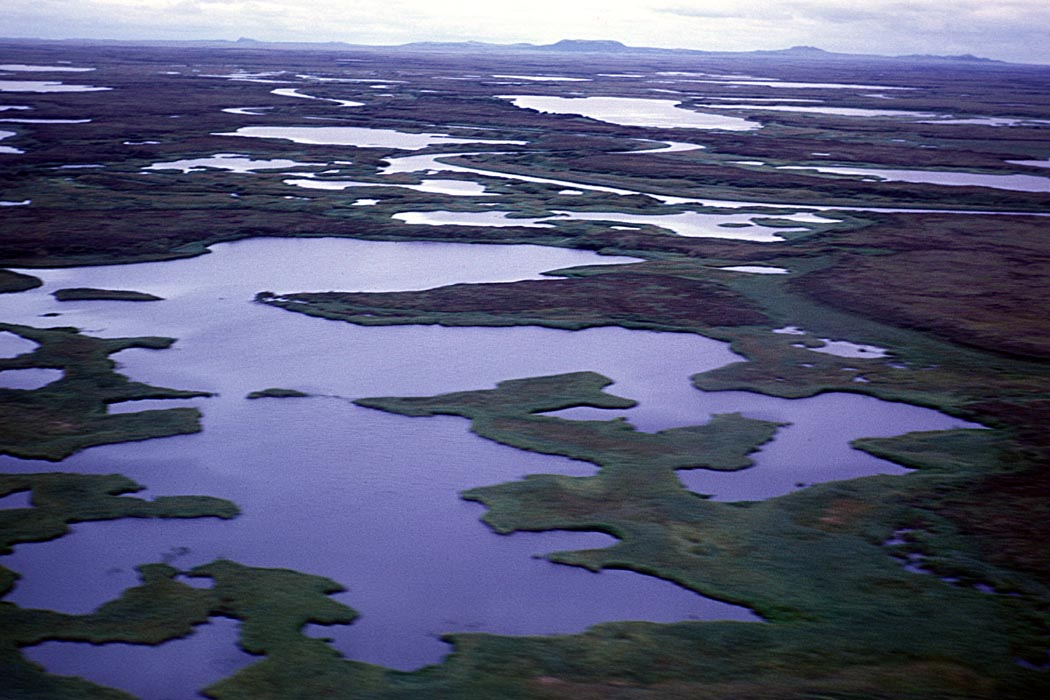
Hazen Bay

Hazen Bay is a 10-mile-wide (16-kilometer) bay of the Bering Sea in the U.S. state of Alaska. It is located 37 miles (60 km) southeast of Hooper Bay and was named for Gen. William Babcock Hazen, U.S. Army Chief Signal Officer, in 1878 by E. W. Nelson of the United States Signal Services.
