= Skwentna River =

- Location of the mouth of the Skwentna River in Alaska
- Native name: Shqitnu (Denaʼina)

Location
- Country: United States
- State: Alaska
- Borough: Matanuska-Susitna

Physical characteristics
- Source
  - coordinates: 61°25′57″N 152°40′47″W; South Twin Glacier
  - elevation: 3,500 ft (1,100 m)
- Mouth
  - coordinates: 61°59′8″N 151°8′23″W; Yentna River
  - elevation: 125 ft (38 m)
- Length: 100 mi (160 km)

The Skwentna River (Dena'ina: Shqitnu) is a river in the southwestern part of Matanuska-Susitna Borough, Alaska.

== History ==
Tanaina Indian name reported in 1898 by Spurr (1900, p. 48), USGS, as "Skwent River."

== Watershed ==
Heads at South Twin Glacier at 61°26′00″N 152°41′00″W, flows North and East to Yentna River, 63 miles (101 km) North of Tyonek, Alaska Cook Inlet Low.

=== Tributaries ===
- Talachulitna River

== Climate ==
Puntilla Lake, 1858 ft (566 m), is a weather station located near the source of the Skwentna River, approximately 50 miles west of Skwentna. Puntilla has a subarctic climate (Köppen Dfc).

Climate data for Puntilla, Alaska, 1991–2020 normals, 1942–2020 extremes: 1858ft (566m)
Month	Jan	Feb	Mar	Apr	May	Jun	Jul	Aug	Sep	Oct	Nov	Dec	Year
Record high °F (°C)	49 (9)	47 (8)	52 (11)	62 (17)	80 (27)	87 (31)	85 (29)	83 (28)	73 (23)	61 (16)	52 (11)	45 (7)	87 (31)
Mean maximum °F (°C)	32.2 (0.1)	35.6 (2.0)	39.0 (3.9)	49.6 (9.8)	66.1 (18.9)	75.0 (23.9)	76.7 (24.8)	70.9 (21.6)	61.4 (16.3)	49.4 (9.7)	35.4 (1.9)	31.1 (−0.5)	78.4 (25.8)
Mean daily maximum °F (°C)	12.0 (−11.1)	21.7 (−5.7)	26.9 (−2.8)	39.5 (4.2)	52.5 (11.4)	61.6 (16.4)	64.4 (18.0)	60.4 (15.8)	50.2 (10.1)	35.2 (1.8)	20.8 (−6.2)	14.4 (−9.8)	38.3 (3.5)
Daily mean °F (°C)	5.9 (−14.5)	13.5 (−10.3)	16.7 (−8.5)	29.7 (−1.3)	42.5 (5.8)	51.6 (10.9)	55.7 (13.2)	52.2 (11.2)	43.1 (6.2)	28.4 (−2.0)	14.2 (−9.9)	8.0 (−13.3)	30.1 (−1.0)
Mean daily minimum °F (°C)	−0.1 (−17.8)	5.3 (−14.8)	6.4 (−14.2)	19.9 (−6.7)	32.4 (0.2)	41.7 (5.4)	47.0 (8.3)	44.0 (6.7)	35.9 (2.2)	21.5 (−5.8)	7.5 (−13.6)	1.6 (−16.9)	21.9 (−5.6)
Mean minimum °F (°C)	−28.6 (−33.7)	−23.1 (−30.6)	−19.1 (−28.4)	−5.7 (−20.9)	18.2 (−7.7)	28.1 (−2.2)	35.6 (2.0)	29.7 (−1.3)	19.9 (−6.7)	2.6 (−16.3)	−14.0 (−25.6)	−22.8 (−30.4)	−32.3 (−35.7)
Record low °F (°C)	−50 (−46)	−45 (−43)	−40 (−40)	−28 (−33)	−8 (−22)	8 (−13)	25 (−4)	14 (−10)	5 (−15)	−25 (−32)	−36 (−38)	−50 (−46)	−50 (−46)
Average precipitation inches (mm)	1.21 (31)	1.07 (27)	0.61 (15)	0.51 (13)	0.31 (7.9)	1.13 (29)	2.14 (54)	2.14 (54)	2.11 (54)	1.47 (37)	1.41 (36)	1.75 (44)	15.86 (401.9)
Average snowfall inches (cm)	15.90 (40.4)	15.00 (38.1)	8.50 (21.6)	5.30 (13.5)	0.40 (1.0)	0.00 (0.00)	0.00 (0.00)	0.00 (0.00)	1.20 (3.0)	8.60 (21.8)	18.90 (48.0)	22.50 (57.2)	96.3 (244.6)
Average extreme snow depth inches (cm)	34.2 (87)	41.0 (104)	37.7 (96)	32.6 (83)	9.8 (25)	0.0 (0.0)	0.0 (0.0)	0.0 (0.0)	0.9 (2.3)	5.0 (13)	16.0 (41)	26.9 (68)	47.8 (121)
Average precipitation days (≥ 0.01 in)	7.4	7.1	4.6	3.0	3.0	6.8	10.7	10.8	10.9	7.8	8.9	10.6	91.6
Average snowy days (≥ 0.1 in)	8.3	7.4	4.8	2.9	0.4	0.0	0.0	0.0	0.5	4.0	7.3	10.3	45.9
Source 1: NOAA
Source 2: XMACIS2 (records, 1991-2020 monthly max/mins & snow)

== See also ==
- List of rivers of Alaska
