= Kigigak Island =

Coordinates: 60°50′45″N 164°58′54″W

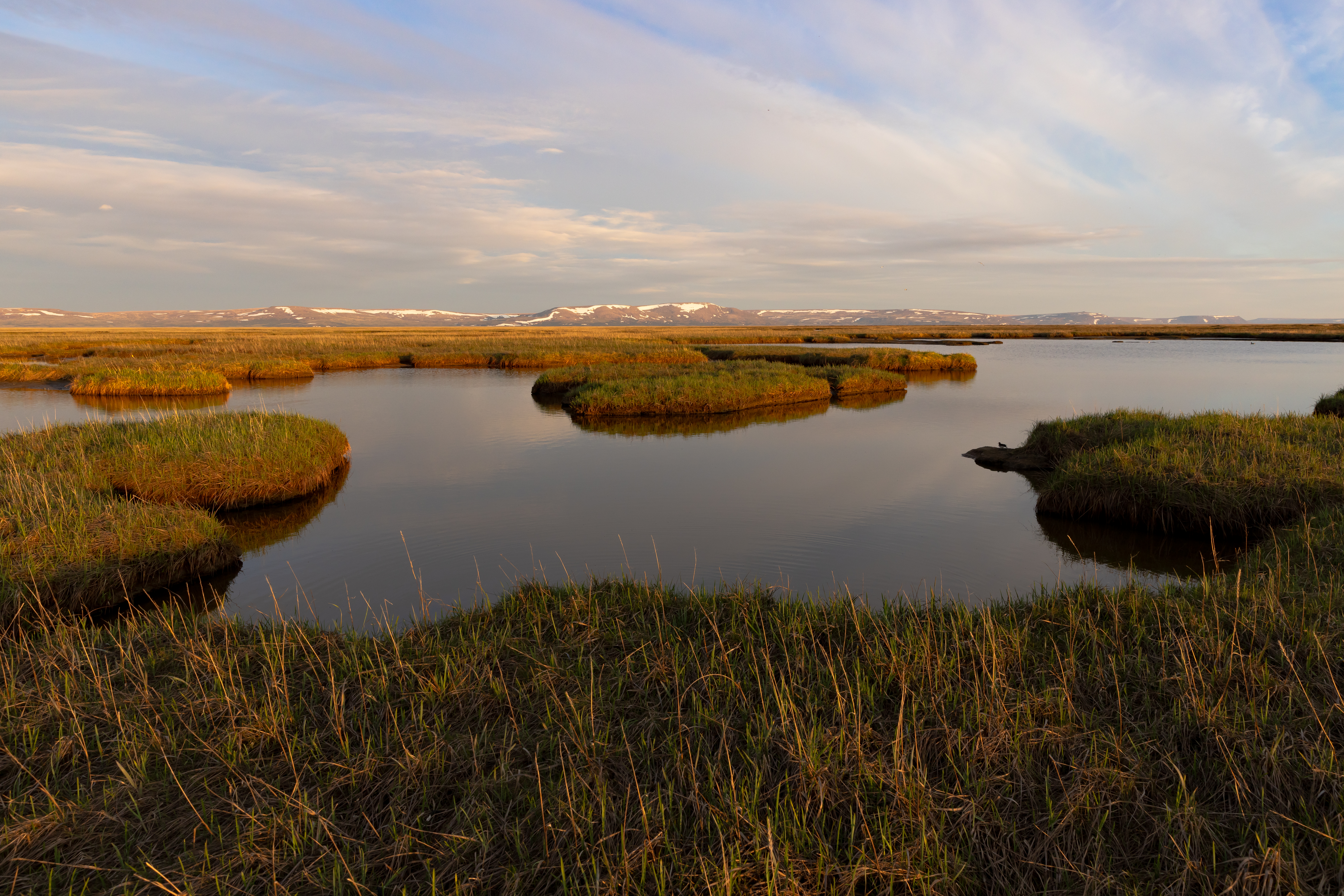
Wetlands on Kigigak Island

Kigigak Island is an island located near the northwest corner of Nelson Island at the mouth of Ninglick River, 110 miles west of Bethel in the Yukon-Kuskokwim Delta. It is 5 miles across. The island has a land area of 31.839 km^{2} (12.293 sq mi) and was unpopulated at the 2000 census. It is part of the Bethel Census Area. The nearest populated communities are Newtok and Tununak.
