= Amak Volcano =

Stratovolcano in Alaska, United States

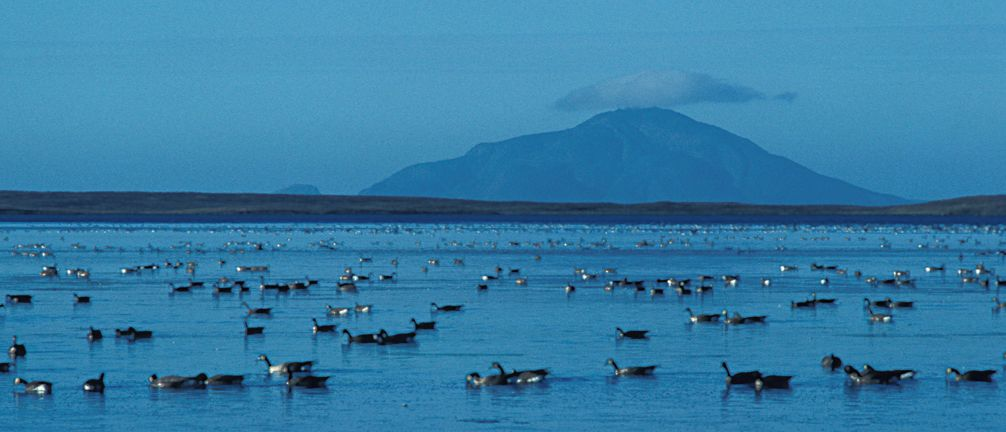
- Amak Island and volcano at top

Highest point
- Elevation: 1,601 ft (488 m)
- Prominence: 488 m (1,601 ft)
- Coordinates: 55°25′02″N 163°08′49″W

Geography
- Location within Alaska
- Location: North Pacific, part of Alaska
- Parent range: Aleutian Islands

Geology
- Formed by: Subduction zone volcanism
- Mountain type: Stratovolcano
- Volcanic arc: Aleutian Arc
- Last eruption: 1796

Amak Volcano is a basaltic andesite stratovolcano in the Aleutian Islands of Alaska, United States, 618 miles (995 km) from Anchorage. It is located on the eponymous island, 31 miles (50 km) from Frosty Volcano and near the edge of the Alaskan Peninsula's western flank. Only boats are allowed to access the island with a certain permit.

Blocky (dotted with flat blocks of minerals and crystals) lava flows stream from its summit to its flanks. Three historical eruptions have taken place – two within the 18th century, the first from 1700 to 1710, and the latter in 1796. The earliest prehistoric eruption was believed to have taken place between 3050 and 2050 BCE.

== Accessibility ==
Cold Bay, the city nearest Amak, is easily accessible by plane. Amak is accessible only by boat; airplanes are not permitted to land on the island. Private boat rides to Amak are available in Cold Bay, but for access to the Aleutian Islands, a permit is required from the United States Fish and Wildlife Service.

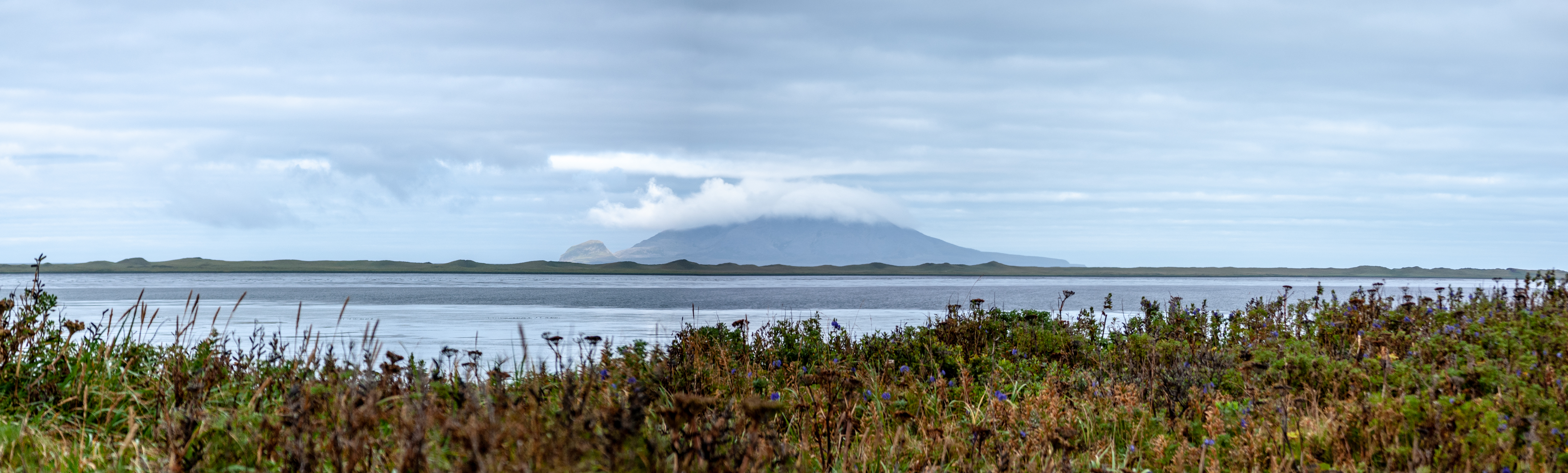
View of Amak Volcano on Amak Island, with Grant Island in front of it, as seen from Grant's Point Observatory in the Izembek National Wildlife Refuge.

== Geography and geology ==
Amak Island lies in the Bering Sea, north of the main archipelago of the Aleutians. It is one of two islands (along with Bogoslof Island) that are 31 miles (50 km) north of the main range.

The United States has the most active volcanoes in the world, many of them geologically young. In Alaska, at least 50 volcanoes, including those in the Aleutian archipelago, have erupted in historical time. The state accounts for ~80% of the United States' volcanoes, excluding the seamounts in the area, ~8% of world volcanoes, and most of these are located among the Aleutian Islands. The Aleutian Islands arc serves as the northern boundary of the Pacific Ring of Fire, where tectonic activity generates earthquakes and volcanic eruptions in masses.

The volcano is basaltic-andesitic in composition. It is a modest stratovolcano, rising no more than 1,683 feet (513 m) above sea level. The volcanic crater is distinct, and has erupted in historical times, only "blocky" lava flows. Charles Wood and Jürgen Kienle, volcanologists, propose that earlier activity, 4,000–5,000 years ago, consisted primarily of lavas of ethereal (fine) platy and thick andesite. Amak Volcano is unique in that its andesitic lavas, while composed the same as the other Aleutians, contain an abundance of potash. They also could contain more sodium carbonate and rare-earth element deposits than the Aleutian norm. Between Bogoslof, the other Aleutian island north of the main arc, and Amak, Amak's lavas are more alkalic and silicic.

Glaciation took place around the volcano roughly 6700 years BP, carving out U-shaped valleys. At the southwest flank of the island, a crater, likely a maar, can be found amid an alluvial plain.

=== Eruptive history ===
The Amak Volcano has erupted three times in historical times: circa 2550 B.C., from 1700 to 1710, and in 1796; the first of these events was identified with tephrochronology. Each eruption has been characterized by lava flows, and the two most recent eruptions included a crater eruption.
