= Kaligagan Island =

Island in Alaska

Coordinates: 54.143°N 164.914°W

Kaligagan Island (also called Qisĝagan or Qisxagan) is an island located in the Krenitzin Islands of Alaska.

== History ==
The name of the island was transcribed in 1852 by the Imperial Russian Navy vice admiral Mikhail Tebenkov.
