= Tigalda Island =

Island in Alaska

Coordinates: 54°05′48″N 165°03′27″W

Location in Alaska

Tigalda Island (Aleut: Qigalĝan) is one of the Krenitzin Islands, a subgroup of the Fox Islands in the eastern Aleutian Islands, Alaska. Tigalda is located about 19 miles (31 km) east of Akutan Island, is 12 miles (19 km) long and has an area of about 35 square miles (91 km^{2}). Tigalda is an Aleut name published by Captain Lutke (1836). It was called "Kagalga" by Captain Lt. Krenitzin and Lt. Levashev (1768). Tigalda Bay (Aleut: Udaĝax̂) is situated on the north side of Tigalda. Father Veniaminov (1840) reported the existence of an Aleut village, which he called "Tigaldinskoe" (Aleut: Qagalĝa), of 91 people in 1833.
