= Iniakuk Lake =

Lake in Alaska, U.S.

- Location within Alaska Location within North America
- Location: Brooks Range, Alaska
- Coordinates: 67°08′01″N 153°13′50″W
- Basin countries: United States
- Max. length: 5 mi (8.0 km)
- Max. width: 1 mi (1.6 km)
- Max. depth: 63 m (207 ft)
- Surface elevation: 758 ft (231 m)

Iniakuk Lake is located on the southern edge of the Brooks Range, 50 mi (80 km) west of Bettles, Alaska. The lake is one mile wide and just over five mi (8.0 km) long. It has a maximum depth of 200 ft (61 m). It is six mi (9.7 km) outside Gates of the Arctic National Park and Preserve and 60 mi (97 km) north of the Arctic Circle. This lake drains into the Iniakuk River, from which the lake received its name.
