= Mikhail Levashov (sailor) =

Russian explorer (1738–1774)

Mikhail Dmitrievich Levashov (Russian: Михаи́л Дми́триевич Левашо́в; c. 1738–1774-76) was a Russian explorer and Lieutenant of the Imperial Russian Navy. After Vitus Bering's 1741 tragic venture, Peter Kuzmich Krenitzin was among the first to conduct an expedition to Alaska and the Aleutians.

== Life ==
Levashev was sent by Russian Empress Catherine II, as main assistant of expedition leader Krenitzin, to explore the northern parts of the Pacific Ocean and particularly the area around the Bering Strait on four ships. Levashev was the commander of ship St. Paul, while Krenitzin was in command of the St. Catherine. Krenitzin and Levashev surveyed the eastern part of the Aleutian island chain. In 1768-69 Levashef wintered in a natural harbor in Unalaska. The following year, after resuming their explorations, both ships wintered in Kamchatka.

Certain geographic features of the Alaskan coast, like Avatanak and Akutan Island were named by Krenitzin and Levashev in the maps that were subsequently published.

On 4 July 1770, when Krenitzin drowned, Levashef assumed command of the Russian expedition fleet and returned to St. Petersburg, where he arrived on 22 October 1771.

Port Levashef, the harbor in Unalaska where Levashev had wintered his first year in the Northern Pacific was named in honor of this early Russian explorer by Lieutenant Gavril Sarychev.
