= Pyotr Krenitsyn =

Russian explorer (1728–1770)

Pyotr Kuzmich Krenitsyn (Russian: Пётр Кузьмич Креницын; 1728 – July 4, 1770), spelled Krenitzin in the United States, was a Russian explorer and captain of the Imperial Russian Navy.

Following Vitus Bering's 1741 tragic venture he was the first to conduct an expedition to Alaska and the Aleutians. Krenitsyn was sent, together with Mikhail Levashev, by Russian Empress Catherine II to explore the northern parts of the Pacific Ocean and particularly the area around the Bering Strait in four ships. Krenitsyn was the commander of the ship St. Catherine and Levashev commanded the ship St. Paul.

== Life ==
Krenitsyn entered the Naval Academy in 1742 and graduated in 1748. In 1764, Catherine II ordered an expedition to the islands of the northern Pacific and Krenitsyn was appointed as the commander of the expedition.

Krenitsyn and Mikhail Levashov surveyed the eastern part of the Aleutian Island chain until the cold weather set in. Krenitsyn wintered in the strait between Unimak and the Alaska Peninsula. The following year, after resuming their surveys, both ships wintered in Kamchatka.

Certain geographic features of the Alaskan coast, like Avatanak, Akutan and Tigalda Island were named by Krenitsyn in the maps that were subsequently published.

On July 4, 1770, Krenitsyn drowned in the Kamchatka River and Levashev assumed command of the Russian expeditionary fleet. The Krenitzin Islands and the highest volcano on Onekotan Island were named by IRN Captain Mikhail Tebenkov after this early Russian explorer.

== Sources ==
- Postnikov, Alexey (2007). "Krenitsyn, Pyotr". The Oxford Companion to World Exploration. Oxford University Press. ISBN 978-0-19-514922-7.
