= Rootok Island =

Island in Aleutians East Borough, Alaska, United States

Coordinates: 54°02′41″N 165°31′55″W

Location in Alaska

Rootok Island (also called Aektok, Aiaktak, Ouektock, Aiaiepta, Veniaminof, or Goloi (alt: Goly; Russian: голый – "bare") is the smallest member of the Krenitzin Islands, a subgroup of the Fox Islands in the eastern Aleutian Islands in Alaska, United States. The island's common spelling of Rooktok appears to have arisen from Aektok. Deviations in compass readings of up to 3 degrees from normal have been observed off the island's north-western side. The island was set aside to house a lighthouse on January 4, 1901; though no navigation aids were ever constructed. The island is uninhabited and it is 6.3 kilometres (3.9 mi) long and 6.2 kilometres (3.9 mi) wide.
