= Pitmegea River =

- Location of the mouth of the Pitmegea River in Alaska

Location
- Country: United States
- State: Alaska
- Borough: North Slope

Physical characteristics
- Source: De Long Mountains
  - coordinates: 68°37′30″N 163°19′54″W
  - elevation: 1,076 ft (328 m)
- Mouth: Chukchi Sea
  - location: Cape Sabine, about 30 miles (48 km) east of Cape Lisburne
  - coordinates: 68°54′53″N 164°37′32″W
  - elevation: 0 ft (0 m)
- Length: 42 mi (68 km)

The Pitmegea River is a 42-mile (68 km) stream in the western North Slope Borough of the U.S. state of Alaska. From its source in the De Long Mountains, the river flows generally northwest to the Chukchi Sea at Cape Sabine, about 30 miles (48 km) east of Cape Lisburne A prospector who explored the river in 1888 reported its Inuit name as Pitmegeak.

== See also ==
- List of rivers of Alaska
