= Mikhail Tebenkov =

Russian hydrographer and vice admiral

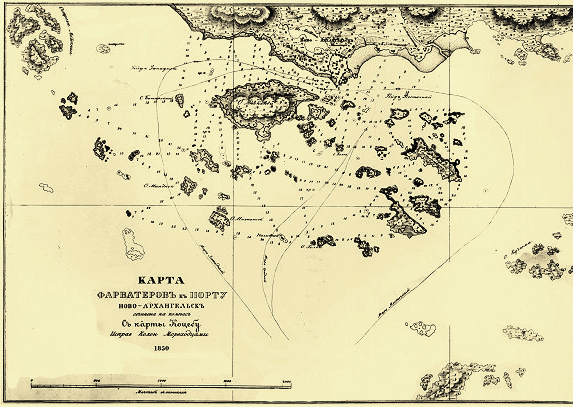
Section of Tebenkov's Sitka Island chart, the place where his Atlas' maps were drawn.

Mikhail Dmitriyevich Tebenkov (Russian: Михаил Дмитриевич Тебеньков; also Tebenkof; 1802 – April 3, 1872) was a Russian hydrographer and vice admiral of the Imperial Russian Navy. From 1845 to 1850, he served as director of the Russian American Company and the governor of Russian America.

He is especially noted for having surveyed and mapped the still little-known coast of Alaska. His Atlas of the Northwest Coasts of America: from Bering Strait to Cape Corrientes and the Aleutian Islands was published in 1852 and contained 39 engraved maps.

== Career ==
In 1821, Mikhail Tebenkov graduated from the Naval Cadet Corps School. For the next three years, he served on different ships in the Baltic Sea. In 1824, Tebenkov was put in charge of logging for shipbuilding purposes near Narva.

In January 1825, he joined the Russian American Company, which led colonizing and trade efforts in North America. He would later command the company-owned brigantines Golovnin, Ryurik, Chichagov, and a sloop named Urup in 1826–1834.

Tebenkov surveyed Norton Sound on behalf of the Imperial Russian Hydrographic Service in 1831 and was the first European to sight the bay that now bears his name. He surveyed Tebenkof Bay in 1833 before returning to Saint Petersburg.

In 1835 Tebenkov sailed from Kronstadt back to Alaska via Cape Horn as commander of the Russian American Company's ship Elena. He arrived in Sitka in April 1836. Between 1845 and 1850, Tebenkov served as the director of the Russian American Company and the governor of Russian America.

Tebenkov dedicated much time and work to the improving the charts of the Alaskan coast.

== Legacy ==
Trebenkov's noted Atlas of the Northwest Coasts of America: from Bering Strait to Cape Corrientes and the Aleutian Islands was published in 1852. The 39 maps of this atlas were engraved at Sitka around 1849 by Kozma Terentev (or Terentief), an Alaskan-Russian creole man.

Besides Tebenkof Bay, other geographic features of Alaska, including Tebenkof Glacier, Mount Tebenkof and Point Tebenkof were named after Captain Mikhail Tebenkov.

== Works ==
- Atlas sieverozapadnykh beregov Ameriki. Sitka (1872).
- Gidrograficheskiia zamiechaniia k Atlasu sieverozapadnykh beregov Ameriki. Sitka (1872).

Preceded by Arvid Adolf Etholén	Governor of Russian Colonies in America; 1845—1850	Succeeded by Nikolay Yakovlevich Rosenberg
