= Akutan Island =

Island in the Fox Islands, Alaska

Coordinates: 54°07′41″N 165°55′05″W

Location in Alaska

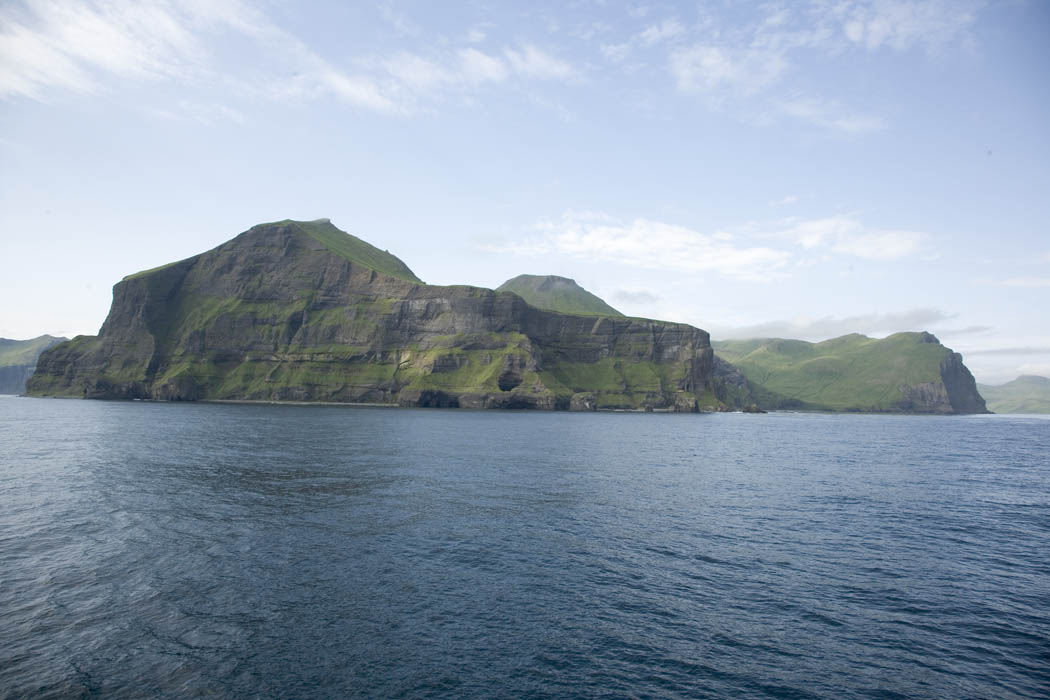
Akutan Island

Akutan Island (Aleut: Akutanax̂; Russian: Акутан) is an inhabited island in the Fox Islands group of the eastern Aleutian Islands in the Aleutians East Borough of Alaska.

== Geography ==
The island is approximately 18 mi (30 km) in length. The land area is 129.01 sq mi (334.13 km^{2}). Mount Akutan volcano is located on the island, which had a major lava eruption in 1979.

The island's population was 1,027 (2010 census). All lived in the city of Akutan, near the island's eastern end.

A significant geothermal area is located on the island including the Akutan Hot Springs.

== History ==
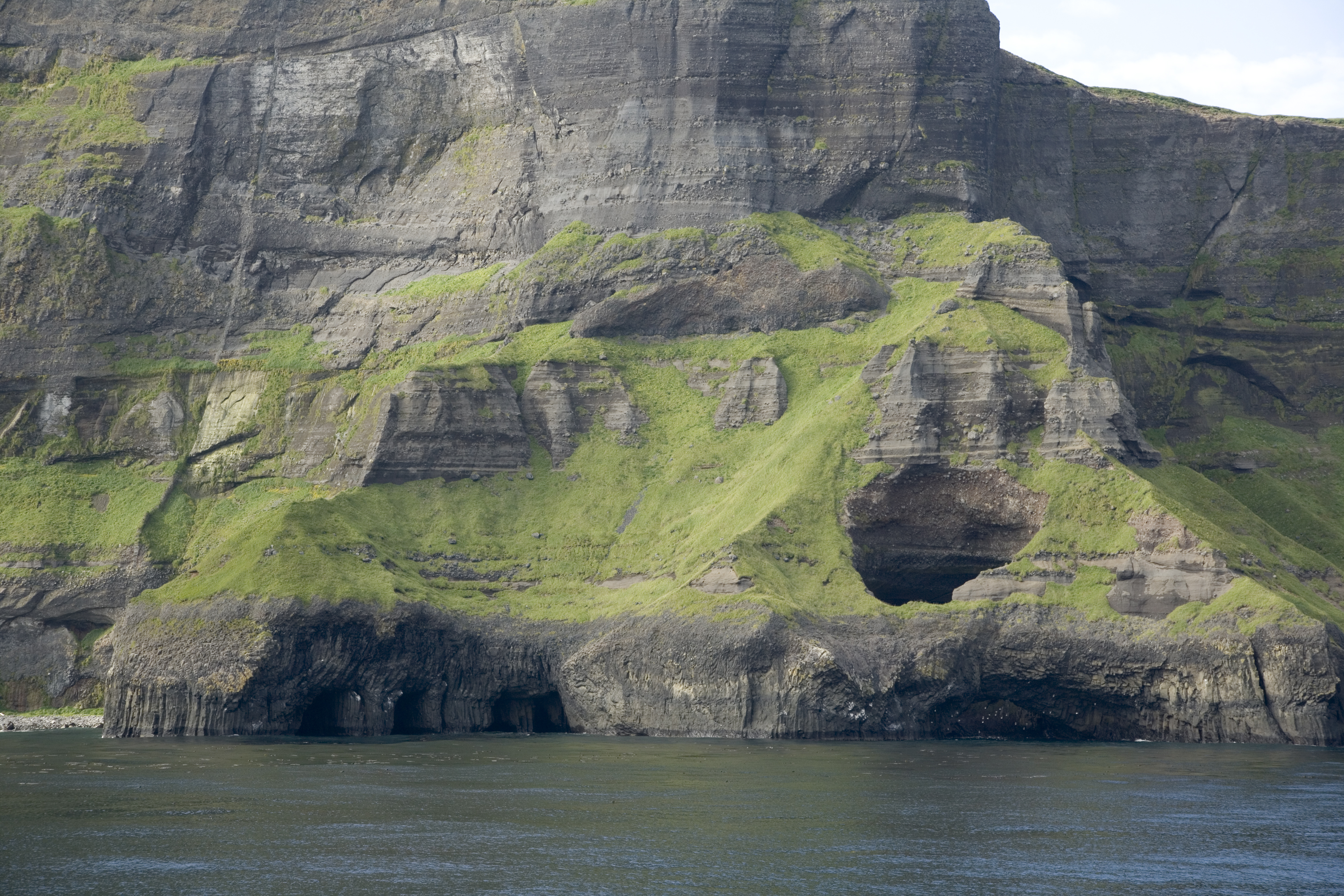
Cliffs of Akutan Island

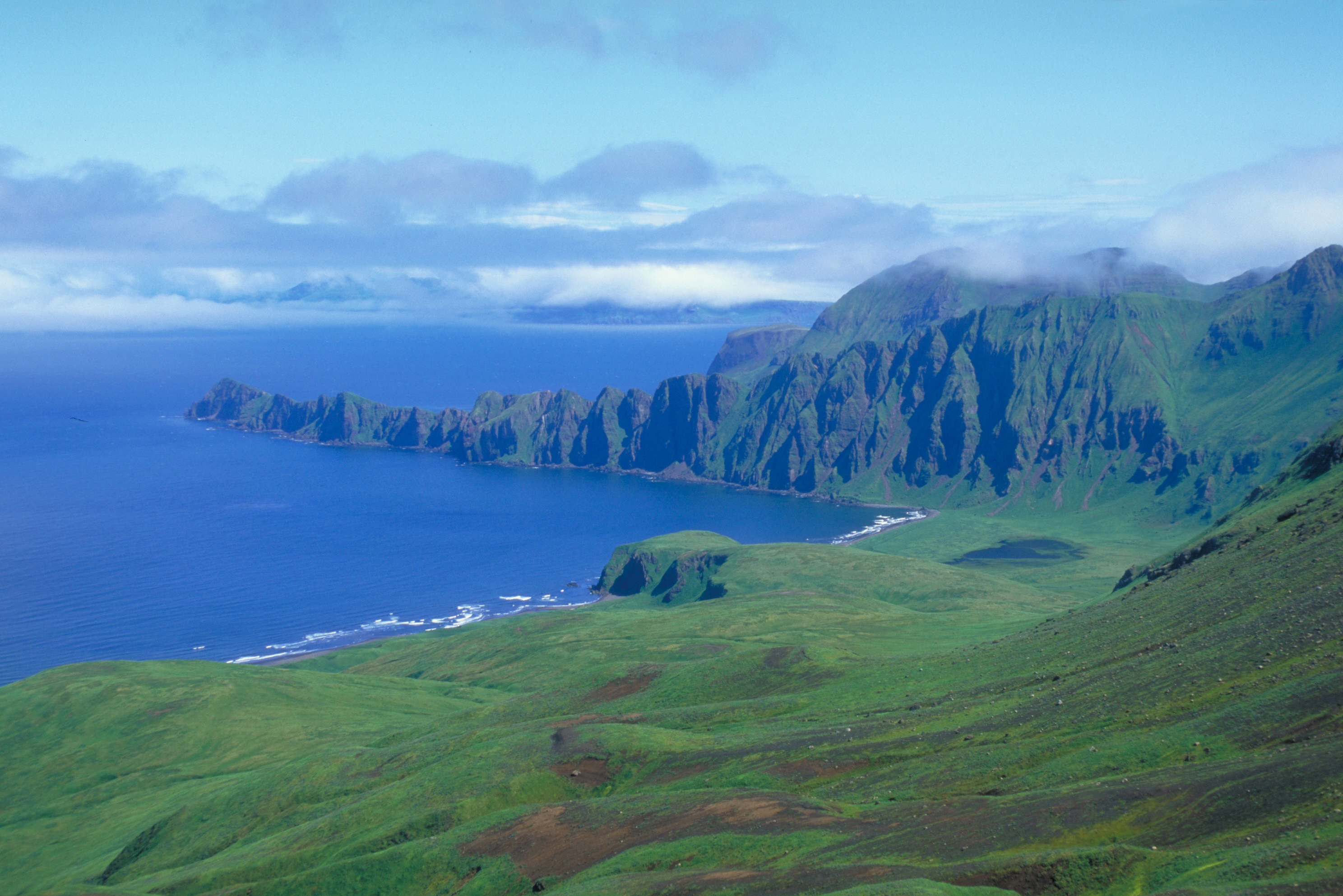
Hot springs bay

Akutan is an Aleut name reported by Capt. Pyotr Krenitsyn and Mikhail Levashev in 1768, and spelled Acootan by James Cook in 1778. This name may be from the Aleut word "hakuta" which, according to R. H. Geoghegan, means "I made a mistake."

The Akutan Zero, a Japanese Zero, was named for the island after it crashed there during World War II and was recovered by the United States military.

== See also ==
- Akutan Seaplane Base
- Islands of Aleutians East Borough, Alaska
