= Fox Islands (Alaska) =

Eastern group of the Aleutian Islands, in the U.S. state of Alaska

Coordinates: 53°47′N 166°35′W

The Fox Islands (Russian: Лисьи острова) are a group of islands in the eastern Aleutian Islands of the U.S. state of Alaska. The Fox Islands are the closest to mainland North America in the Aleutian chain, and just east of Samalga Pass and the Islands of Four Mountains group.

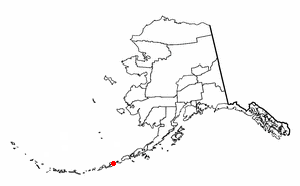
Location of Unalaska, Alaska

Inhabited by the Aleut for centuries, the islands, along with the rest of the Aleutians, were first visited by Europeans in 1741, when an Imperial Russian Navy expedition led by Vitus Bering was searching for new sources of fur for Russian fur trappers.

Foggy almost all year round, the islands are difficult to navigate due to constantly adverse weather and numerous reefs. The Fox Islands Passes are the waterways surrounding the islands. As with the other Aleutian islands, the Fox Islands are prone to frequent earthquakes year-round.

The larger Fox Islands are, from west to east, Umnak, Unalaska, Amaknak, Akutan, Akun, Unimak and Sanak. Islands lying west of Akutan are in the Aleutians West Census Area. From Akutan eastward they are in the Aleutians East Borough.

Fox Islands is the English translation of the name given to the islands in the 18th century by Russian explorers and fur traders.
