= List of rivers of Alaska =

This is a List of rivers in Alaska, which are at least fifth-order according to the Strahler method of stream classification, and an incomplete list of otherwise-notable rivers and streams. Alaska has more than 12,000 rivers, and thousands more streams and creeks. According to United States Geological Survey Geographic Names Information System, Alaska has about 9,728 officially named rivers, creeks, and streams. The length of the river is given if it is available from the United States Geological Survey Geographic Names Information System (GNIS).

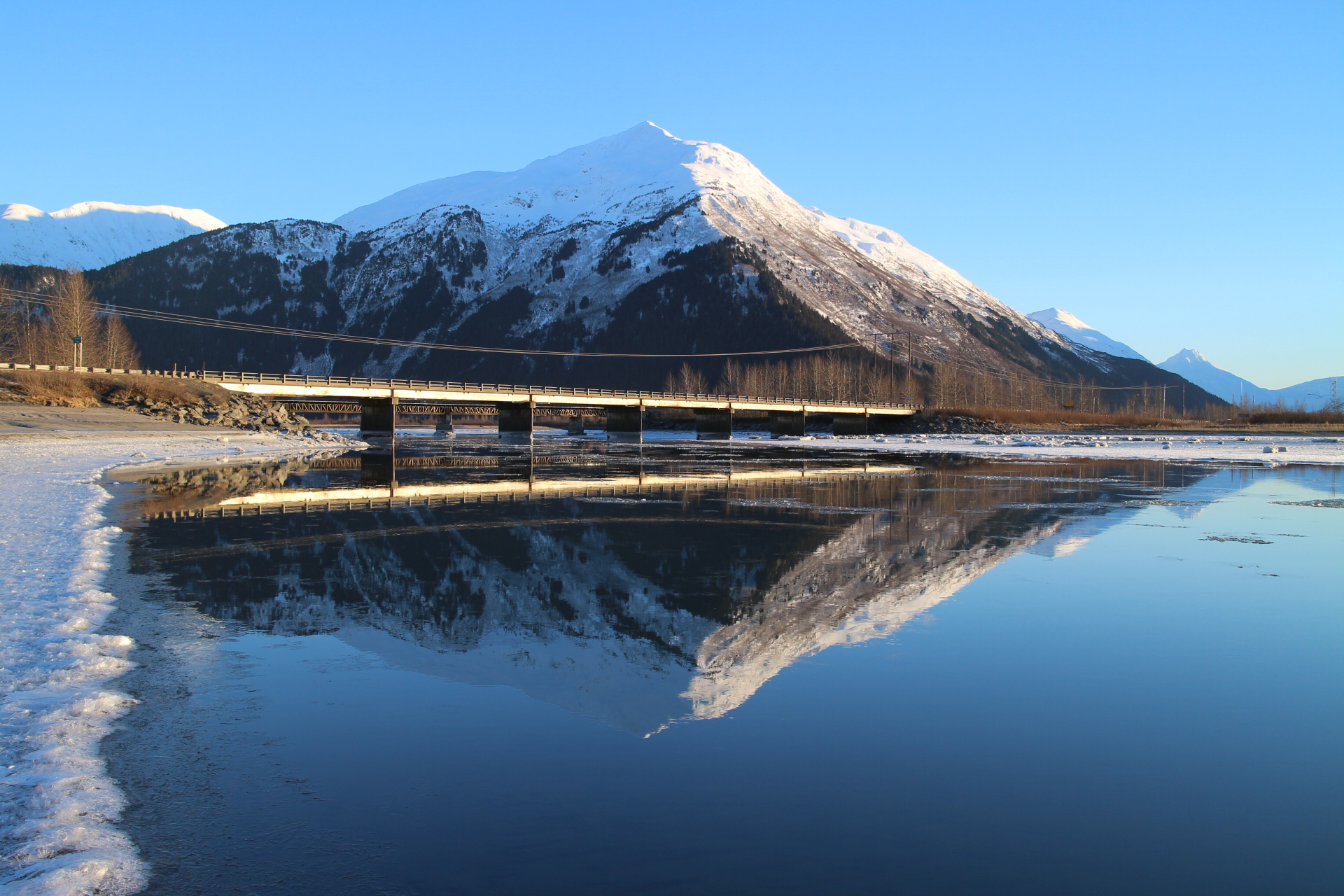
The Twentymile River near the Seward Highway, January 2015

== By drainage basin ==
This list is arranged by drainage basin, with respective tributaries ordered from mouth to source, and indented under their downstream parent's name.

=== Arctic Ocean ===
- Firth River – 125 miles (201 km)
- Kongakut River – 110 miles (180 km)
- Aichilik River – 75 miles (121 km)
- Jago River – 90 miles (140 km)
- Okpilak River – 70 miles (110 km)
- Hulahula River – 90 miles (140 km)
- Sadlerochit River – 70 miles (110 km)
- Canning River – 125 miles (201 km)
  - Marsh Fork Canning River – 50 miles (80 km)
- Shaviovik River – 75 miles (121 km)
  - Kavik River – 75 miles (121 km)
- Kadleroshilik River – 90 miles (140 km)
- Sagavanirktok River – 185 miles (298 km)
  - Ivishak River – 90 miles (140 km)
    - Echooka River – 74 miles (119 km)
  - Ribdon River – 50 miles (80 km)
  - Atigun River – 45 miles (72 km)
- Kuparuk River – 150 miles (240 km)
  - Toolik River – 120 miles (190 km)
- Colville River – 350 miles (560 km)
  - Itkillik River – 220 miles (350 km)
  - Anaktuvuk River – 135 miles (217 km)
    - Nanushuk River – 100 miles (160 km)
  - Chandler River – 100 miles (160 km)
    - Siksikpuk River – 49 miles (79 km)
    - Ayiyak River – 58 miles (93 km)
  - Killik River – 105 miles (169 km)
    - Okokmilaga River – 50 miles (80 km)
  - Oolamnagavik River – 38 miles (61 km)
  - Kurupa River – 80 miles (130 km)
  - Awuna River – 200 miles (320 km)
  - Etivluk River – 56 miles (90 km)
    - Nigu River – 70 miles (110 km)
  - Ipnavik River – 68 miles (109 km)
  - Kuna River – 50 miles (80 km)
  - Kiligwa River
  - Nuka River – 50 miles (80 km)
- Fish Creek – 110 miles (180 km)
- Ikpikpuk River – 195 miles (314 km)
  - Titaluk River – 180 miles (290 km)
  - Price River – 45 miles (72 km)
- Topagoruk River – 160 miles (260 km)
- Meade River – 150 miles (240 km)
  - Usuktuk River – 135 miles (217 km)
- Kuk River – 36 miles (58 km)
  - Kungok River – 26 miles (42 km)
  - Ivisaruk River – 78 miles (126 km)
  - Avalik River – 85 miles (137 km)
    - Ketik River – 85 miles (137 km)
  - Kaolak River – 60 miles (97 km)
- Utukok River – 180 miles (290 km)
- Kokolik River – 200 miles (320 km)
  - Avingak Creek – 28 miles (45 km)
- Kukpowruk River – 160 miles (260 km)
- Pitmegea River – 42 miles (68 km)
- Mutaktuk Creek
- Kukpuk River – 125 miles (201 km)
  - Ipewik River – 85 miles (137 km)

=== Bering Strait ===
- Kivalina River – 60 miles (97 km)
- Wulik River – 80 miles (130 km)
- Noatak River – 425 miles (684 km)
  - Agashashok River – 42 miles (68 km)
  - Eli River – 90 miles (140 km)
  - Kelly River – 45 miles (72 km)
  - Kugururok River – 60 miles (97 km)
  - Nimiuktuk River
  - Anisak River – 65 miles (105 km)
  - Cutler River – 45 miles (72 km)
    - Imelyak River – 55 miles (89 km)
  - Aniuk River – 45 miles (72 km)
- Kobuk River – 280 miles (450 km)
  - Squirrel River – 72 miles (116 km)
  - Salmon River – 60 miles (97 km)
  - Ambler River – 75 miles (121 km)
  - Kogoluktuk River – 45 miles (72 km)
  - Mauneluk River – 50 miles (80 km)
  - Pah River – 55 miles (89 km)
  - Reed River – 52 miles (84 km)
- Selawik River – 140 miles (230 km)
  - Kugarak River – 58 miles (93 km)
  - Tagagawik River – 85 miles (137 km)
- Buckland River – 67 miles (108 km)
- Kiwalik River – 58 miles (93 km)
- Kugruk River – 60 miles (97 km)
- Inmachuk River - 30 miles (48 km)
- Goodhope River – 48 miles (77 km)
- Nugnugaluktuk River – 26 miles (42 km)
- Agiapuk River – 60 miles (97 km)
  - American River – 35 miles (56 km)
- Kuzitrin River – 95 miles (153 km)
  - Kruzgamepa River - 25 miles (40 km)
    - Grand Central River - 12 miles (19 km)
  - Kougarok River – 45 miles (72 km)
  - Noxapaga River – 56 miles (90 km)
- Feather River – 17 miles (27 km)
- Bluestone River – 13 miles (21 km)
- Sinuk River
- Cripple River
- Penny River – 13 miles (21 km)
- Snake River – 20 miles (32 km)
- Nome River – 40 miles (64 km)
  - Nil Desperandum Gulch
- Fish River – 47 miles (76 km)
  - Niukluk River – 52 miles (84 km)
    - Casadepaga River – 32 miles (51 km)
- Tubutulik River – 25 miles (40 km)
- Koyuk River – 115 miles (185 km)
- Nuluk River - 40 miles (64 km)
- Inglutalik River – 80 miles (130 km)
  - Nigikmigoon River
- Ungalik River – 90 miles (140 km)
- Shaktoolik River – 90 miles (140 km)
- Unalakleet River – 90 miles (140 km)
  - South River
  - North River – 60 miles (97 km)
  - Chiroskey River – 50 miles (80 km)
  - Old Woman River
- Pastolik River – 65 miles (105 km)

=== Yukon River Basin ===
- Yukon River – 1,980 miles (3,190 km)
  - Archuelinguk River - 25 miles (40 km)
  - Andreafsky River – 120 miles (190 km)
    - East Fork Andreafsky River – 125 miles (201 km)
  - Atchuelinguk River – 165 miles (266 km)
  - Reindeer River – 60 miles (97 km)
  - Innoko River – 500 miles (800 km)
    - Paimiut Slough – 70 miles (110 km)
      - Reindeer River – 65 miles (105 km)
    - Iditarod River – 325 miles (523 km)
      - Yetna River – 60 miles (97 km)
    - Mud River – 57 miles (92 km)
    - Dishna River – 60 miles (97 km)
  - Bonasila River – 125 miles (201 km)
    - Stuyahok River – 75 miles (121 km)
  - Anvik River – 140 miles (230 km)
  - Khotol River – 85 miles (137 km)
  - Nulato River – 71 miles (114 km)
  - Koyukuk River – 425 miles (684 km)
    - Gisasa River – 70 miles (110 km)
    - Kateel River – 115 miles (185 km)
    - Dulbi River – 85 miles (137 km)
    - Huslia River – 100 miles (160 km)
    - Hogatza River – 120 miles (190 km)
    - Indian River – 53 miles (85 km)
    - Kanuti River – 175 miles (282 km)
      - Kanuti Kilolitna River – 60 miles (97 km)
    - Alatna River – 145 miles (233 km)
    - South Fork Koyukuk River – 140 miles (230 km)
      - Fish Creek – 60 miles (97 km)
      - Jim River – 60 miles (97 km)
    - John River – 125 miles (201 km)
    - Wild River – 63 miles (101 km)
    - North Fork Koyukuk River – 100 miles (160 km)
      - Tinayguk River – 44 miles (71 km)
    - Middle Fork Koyukuk River – 62 miles (100 km)
      - Bettles River
      - Dietrich River – 35 miles (56 km)
      - Hammond River - 38 miles (61 km)
  - Yuki River – 85 miles (137 km)
  - Melozitna River – 135 miles (217 km)
    - Little Melozitna River – 38 miles (61 km)
  - Big Creek- 55 miles (89 km)
  - Nowitna River – 250 miles (400 km)
    - Sulatna River – 100 miles (160 km)
    - Lost River - 33 miles (53 km)
    - Little Mud River-45 miles (72 km)
    - Big Mud River - 31 miles (50 km)
    - Titna River – 80 miles (130 km)
      - Telsitna River - 25 miles (40 km)
      - Sethkokna River – 52 miles (84 km)
    - Sulukna River-35 miles (56 km)
    - Susulatna River – 41 miles (66 km)
  - Bering Creek-28 miles (45 km)
  - Tozitna River – 83 miles (134 km)
  - Tanana River – 659 miles (1,061 km)
    - Chitanana River – 65 miles (105 km)
    - Cosna River – 44 miles (71 km)
    - Zitiana River – 63 miles (101 km)
    - Kantishna River – 108 miles (174 km)
      - Toklat River – 85 miles (137 km)
        - Sushana River-38 miles (61 km)
      - Bearpaw River - 55 miles (89 km)
        - Moose Creek
          - Lake Creek
      - John Hansen Creek
      - McKinley River – 58 miles (93 km)
      - Birch Creek – 65 miles (105 km)
        - Muddy River – 25 miles (40 km)
          - Foraker River – 60 miles (97 km)
            - Herron River - 48 miles (77 km)
              - Wolf Creek - 20 miles (32 km)
    - Tolovana River – 117 miles (188 km)
      - Chatanika River - 128 miles (206 km)
        - Tatalina River-75 miles (121 km)
    - Totchaket Slough-7 miles (11 km)
    - West middle river / East middle river - 15 miles (24 km)
    - Nenana River – 140 miles (230 km)
      - Seventeenmile slough - 17 miles (27 km)
      - Teklanika River – 90 miles (140 km)
        - Savage River - 30 miles (48 km)
        - Sanctuary River - 30 miles (48 km)
    - Togatilli Creek - 5 miles (8.0 km)
    - Totatlanika River-30 miles (48 km)
    - Wood River – 115 miles (185 km)
      - Tatlanika Creek-54 miles (87 km)
    - Crooked Creek- 28 miles (45 km)
    - Willow Creek - 30 miles (48 km)
    - Clear Creek - 37 miles (60 km)
    - Chena River – 100 miles (160 km)
      - Little Chena river - 35 miles (56 km)
    - Salcha River – 125 miles (201 km)
    - Little Delta River – 24 miles (39 km)
    - Delta Creek – 40 miles (64 km)
    - Delta River – 80 miles (130 km)
    - Goodpaster River – 91 miles (146 km)
    - Gerstle River - 40 miles (64 km)
    - Volkmar River - 26 miles (42 km)
    - Healy River - 50 miles (80 km)
    - Johnson River - 23 miles (37 km)
    - Robertson River - 26 miles (42 km)
    - Tok River – 60 miles (97 km)
    - Tetlin River – 75 miles (121 km)
      - Kalukna River - 37 miles (60 km)
    - Kalutna River - 25 miles (40 km)
    - Chisana River – 105 miles (169 km)
    - Nabesna River – 75 miles (121 km)
      - Cheslina River - 25 miles (40 km)
  - Hess Creek – 50 miles (80 km)
    - Troublesome Creek (Hess Creek)
  - Ray River – 43 miles (69 km)
  - Dall River – 80 miles (130 km)
  - Hodzana River – 125 miles (201 km)
  - Beaver Creek – 180 miles (290 km)
  - Hadweenzic River – 93 miles (150 km)
  - Birch Creek – 150 miles (240 km)
    - Preacher Creek – 68 miles (109 km)
  - Chandalar River – 100 miles (160 km)
    - East Fork Chandalar River – 175 miles (282 km)
      - North Fork East Fork Chandalar River – 54 miles (87 km)
      - Wind River – 80 miles (130 km)
      - Junjik River – 65 miles (105 km)
    - Middle Fork Chandalar River – 102 miles (164 km)
    - North Fork Chandalar River – 104 miles (167 km)
  - Christian River – 140 miles (230 km)
  - Porcupine River – 569 miles (916 km)
    - Grass River – 39 miles (63 km)
      - Little Black River – 82 miles (132 km)
    - Draanjik River – 160 miles (260 km)
      - Salmon Fork Black River – 90 miles (140 km)
      - Grayling Fork Black River – 80 miles (130 km)
    - Sheenjek River – 200 miles (320 km)
      - Koness River – 72 miles (116 km)
    - Coleen River – 52 miles (84 km)
    - Old Crow River – 175 miles (282 km)
  - Charley River – 88 miles (142 km)
  - Kandik River – 82 miles (132 km)
  - Nation River – 70 miles (110 km)
  - Seventymile River – 58 miles (93 km)
  - Tatonduk River – 70 miles (110 km)
  - Fortymile River – 60 miles (97 km)
    - North Fork Fortymile River – 44 miles (71 km)
      - Middle Fork Fortymile River – 60 miles (97 km)
    - South Fork Fortymile River – 33 miles (53 km)
      - Mosquito Fork – 86 miles (138 km)
      - Dennison Fork – 60 miles (97 km)
  - Sixtymile River – 85 miles (137 km)
  - White River – 200 miles (320 km)
    - Ladue River – 100 miles (160 km)
    - Beaver Creek – 85 miles (137 km)

=== Bering Sea ===
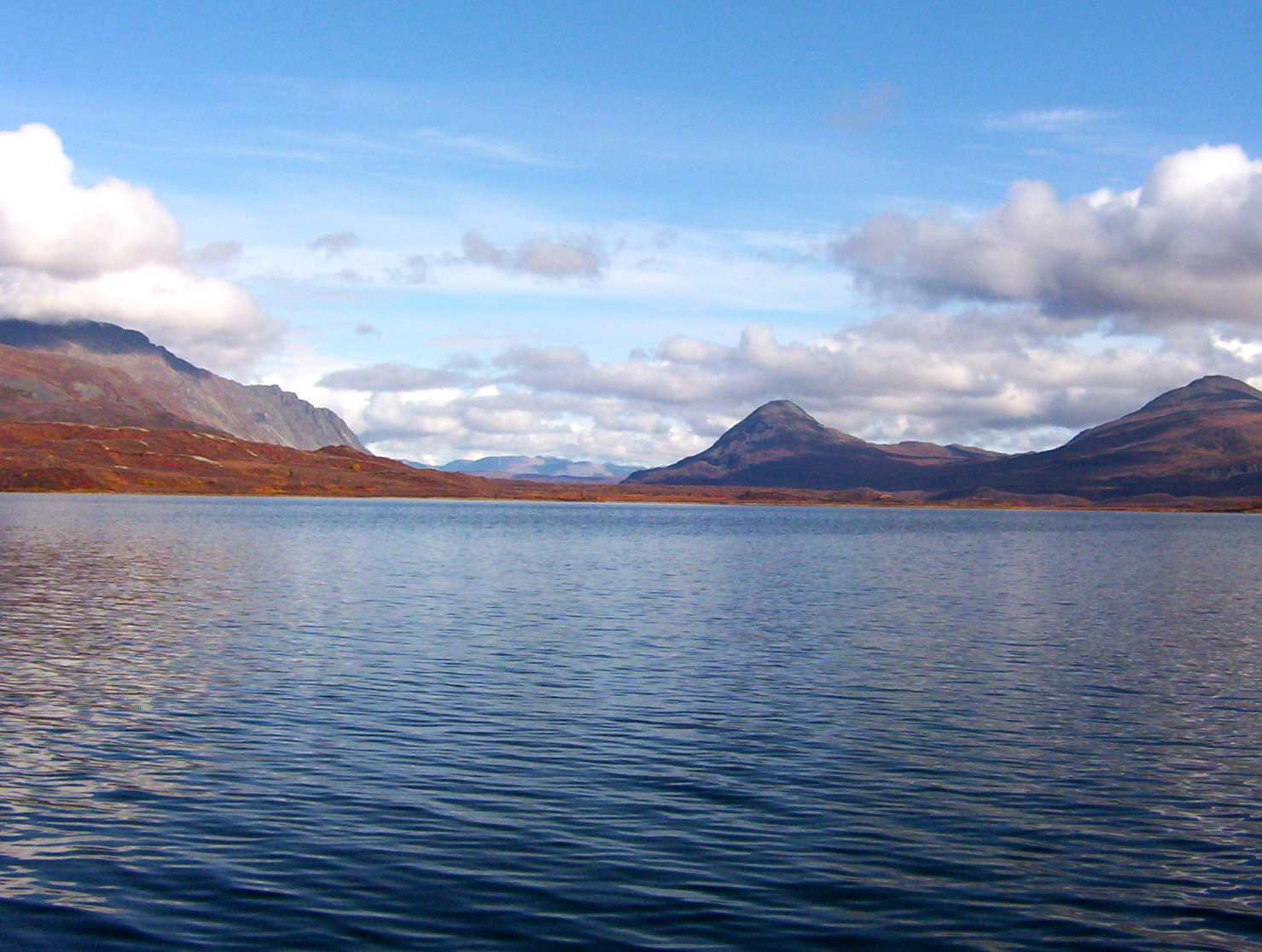
The Tangle Lakes in the Alaska Range sit on the divide between the Bering Sea and Gulf of Alaska watersheds, and are the source of the Delta River

- Black River – 90 miles (140 km)
- Kun River – 65 miles (105 km)
- Kokechik River – 60 miles (Kashunuk distributary)
- Kashunuk River – 225 miles (Yukon distributary)
- Manokinak River – 75 miles (121 km)
- Azun River – 50 miles (80 km)
- Joshua Green River - 15 miles (24 km)
- Ningaluk River – 44 miles (71 km)
  - Izaviknek River – 80 miles (130 km)
- Kolavinarak River – 40 miles (64 km)
- Kuskokwim River – 724 miles (1,165 km)
  - Eek River – 108 miles (174 km)
  - Johnson River – 215 miles (346 km)
  - Gweek River – 70 miles (110 km)
  - Kwethluk River – 85 miles (137 km)
  - Kisaralik River – 90 miles (140 km)
  - Tuluksak River – 90 miles (140 km)
  - Aniak River – 140 miles (230 km)
  - George River – 80 miles (130 km)
  - Holitna River – 110 miles (180 km)
    - Hoholitna River – 165 miles (266 km)
  - Stony River – 190 miles (310 km)
  - Swift River – 100 miles (160 km)
  - Takotna River – 120 miles (190 km)
    - Nixon Fork – 88 miles (142 km)
  - Middle Fork Kuskokwim River – 130 miles (210 km)
    - Big River – 130 miles (210 km)
  - South Fork Kuskokwim River – 130 miles (210 km)
  - East Fork Kuskokwim River – 40 miles (64 km)
    - Slow Fork – 60 miles (97 km)
    - Tonzona River – 75 miles (121 km)
  - North Fork Kuskokwim River – 150 miles (240 km)
    - Swift Fork – 75 miles (121 km)
- Kanektok River – 75 miles (121 km)
- Arolik River – 38 miles (61 km)
- Goodnews River – 60 miles (97 km)
- Togiak River – 48 miles (77 km)
- Igushik River – 50 miles (80 km)
- Snake River – 45 miles (72 km)
- Nushagak River – 242 miles (389 km)
  - Wood River – 20 miles (32 km)
  - Kokwok River – 36 miles (58 km)
  - Mulchatna River – 160 miles (260 km)
    - Stuyahok River – 45 miles (72 km)
    - Koktuli River
    - Chilikadrotna River – 55 miles (89 km)
  - Nuyakuk River – 36 miles (58 km)
    - Tikchik River – 45 miles (72 km)
  - King Salmon River – 45 miles (72 km)
- Kvichak River – 50 miles (80 km)
  - Alagnak River – 64 miles (103 km)
  - Newhalen River – 22 miles (35 km)
    - Chulitna River – 90 miles (140 km)
    - Tlikakila River – 50 miles (80 km)
- Naknek River – 35 miles (56 km)
  - Savonoski River – 35 miles (56 km)
    - American Creek – 50 miles (80 km)
- Egegik River (also Ugaguk) – 28 miles (45 km)
  - King Salmon River – 60 miles (97 km)
- Dago Creek – 50 miles (80 km)
- Ugashik River – 43 miles (69 km)
  - King Salmon River – 35 miles (56 km)
  - Dog Salmon River – 70 miles (110 km)
- Cinder River – 44 miles (71 km)
- Meshik River – 31 miles (50 km)
- Caribou River (Alaska) – 50 miles (80 km)

=== Gulf of Alaska ===
- Chignik River – 20 miles (32 km)
- Aniakchak River – 27 miles (43 km)
- Ayakulik River – 28 miles (45 km)
- Karluk River – 24 miles (39 km)
- Kamishak River – 38 miles (61 km)
- McNeil River – 22 miles (35 km)
- McArthur River – 33 miles (53 km)
  - Chakachatna River – 36 miles (58 km)
- Beluga River – 35 miles (56 km)

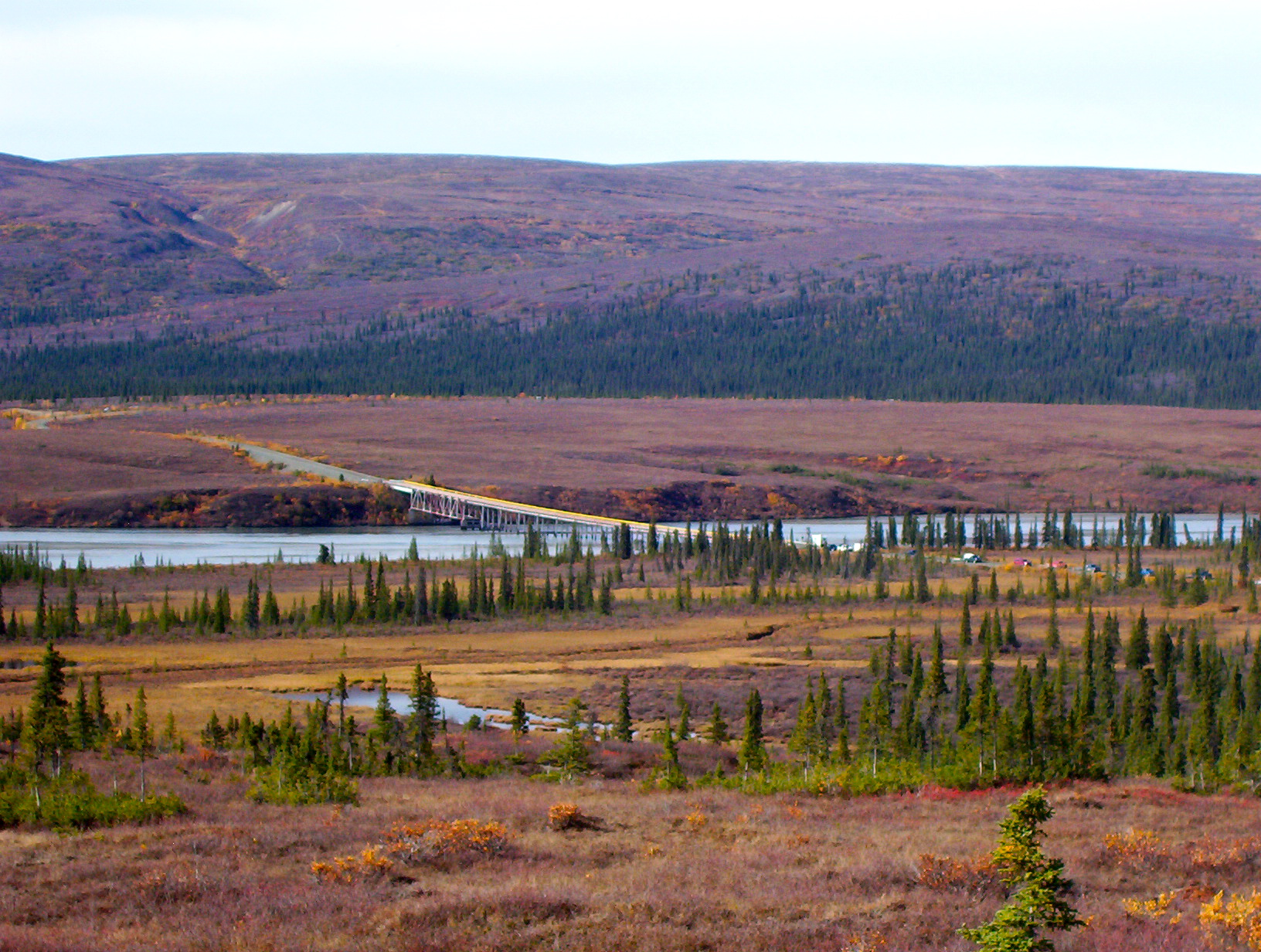
The Denali Highway crosses the upper Susitna river

- Susitna River – 313 miles (504 km)
  - Yentna River – 75 miles (121 km)
    - Kahiltna River – 60 miles (97 km)
    - Skwentna River – 100 miles (160 km)
      - Talachulitna River – 45 miles (72 km)
  - Deshka River – 44 miles (71 km)
    - Kroto Creek
    - Moose Creek
  - Talkeetna River – 85 miles (137 km)
  - Chulitna River – 70 miles (110 km)
    - Tokositna River – 34 miles (55 km)
  - Oshetna River – 55 miles (89 km)
  - Tyone River – 30 miles (48 km)
  - Maclaren River – 55 miles (89 km)
- Little Susitna River – 110 miles (180 km)
- Matanuska River – 75 miles (121 km)
  - Kings River - 15 miles (24 km)
  - Chickaloon River – 34 miles (55 km)
- Knik River – 25 miles (40 km)
- Eklutna River – 22 miles (35 km)
- Eagle River – 40 miles (64 km)
- Ship Creek – 30 miles (48 km)
- Twentymile River - 30 miles (48 km)
- Placer River - 30 miles (48 km)
- Chickaloon River – 36 miles (58 km)
- Swanson River – 40 miles (64 km)
- Kenai River – 75 miles (121 km)
  - Snow River - 18 miles (29 km)
  - Skilak River - 5 miles (8.0 km)
- Kasilof River – 17 miles (27 km)
- Ninilchik River – 21 miles (34 km)
- Nelchina River – 47 miles (76 km)
  - Little Nelchina River – 44 miles (71 km)
- Anchor River – 30 miles (48 km)
- Fox River – 27 miles (43 km)
- Martin River – 7 miles (11 km)
- Lowe River – 20 miles (32 km)
- Copper River – 300 miles (480 km)
  - Martin River – 22 miles (35 km)
  - Bremner River – 40 miles (64 km)
  - Tasnuna River
  - Tiekel River – 34 miles (55 km)
  - Chitina River – 112 miles (180 km)
    - Nizina River – 37 miles (60 km)
    - Tana River – 31 miles (50 km)
  - Slana River – 55 miles (89 km)
  - Tonsina River – 60 miles (97 km)
  - Klutina River – 63 miles (101 km)
  - Tazlina River – 30 miles (48 km)
  - Gulkana River – 50 miles (80 km)
  - Gakona River – 64 miles (103 km)
  - Chistochina River – 48 miles (77 km)

=== Southeast Alaska ===
- Bering River – 21 miles (34 km)
- Duktoth River – 28 miles (45 km)
- Yahtse River
- Alsek River – 240 miles (390 km)
- Endicott River – 25 miles (40 km)
- Chilkat River – 52 miles (84 km)
  - Tsirku River – 25 miles (40 km)
  - Klehini River – 30 miles (48 km)
  - Kelsall River – 19 miles (31 km)
- Chilkoot River – 20 miles (32 km)
- Taiya River – 17 miles (27 km)
- Eagle River (Favorite Channel) – 5 miles (8 km)
- Taku River – 54 miles (87 km)
- Whiting River – 40 miles (64 km)
- Stikine River – 379 miles (610 km)
- Eagle River (Bradfield Canal) – 8 miles (13 km)
- King Salmon River – 11 miles (18 km)
- Craig River enters Canada to join the Iskut
- Unuk River – 80 miles (130 km)
- Chickamin River – 37 miles (60 km)
- Skagway River
  - Porcupine Creek (Porcupine River tributary)
- Blue River
- Behm River

== Alphabetically ==
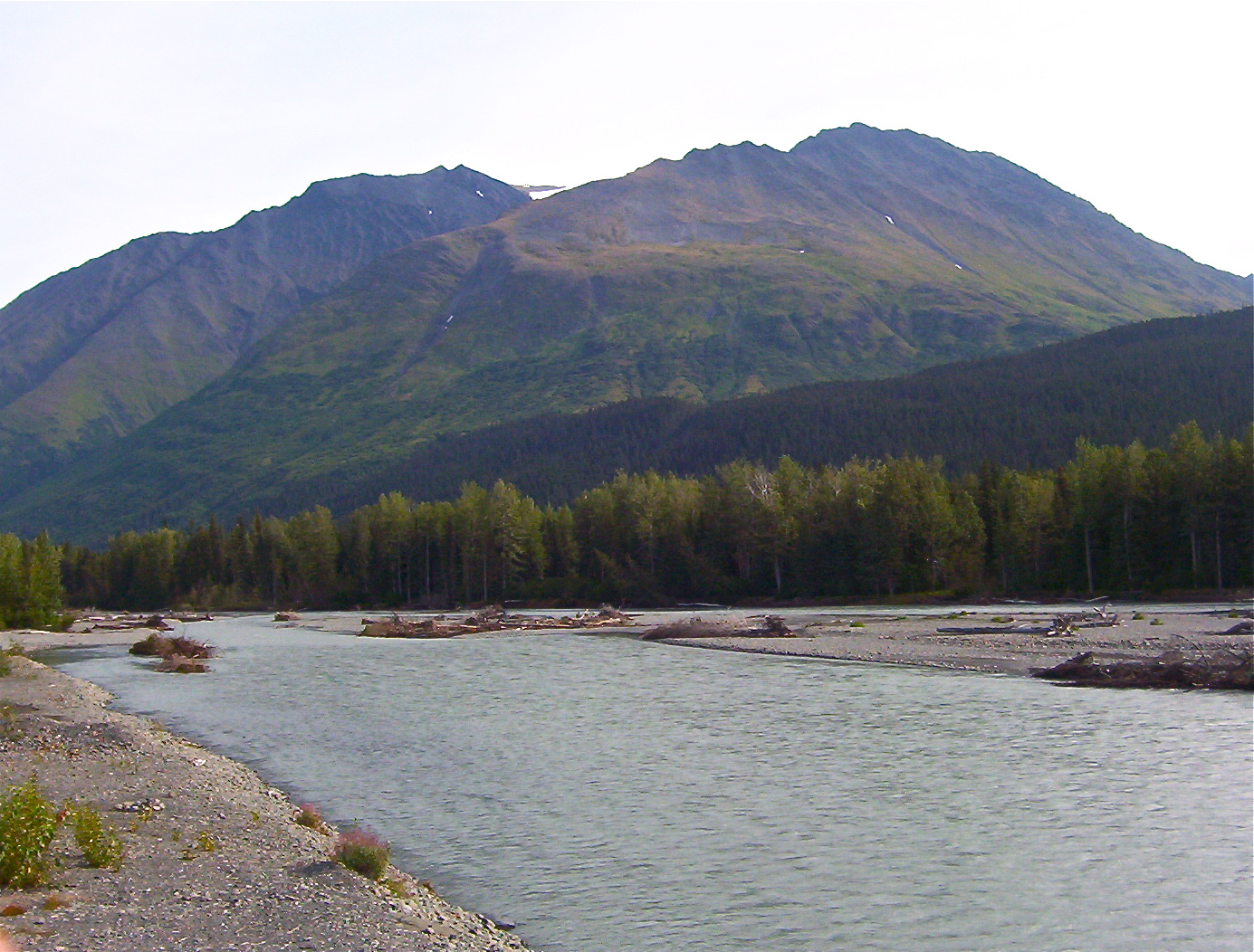
The Snow River near Seward

- Agashashok River
- Agiapuk River
- Aichilik River
- Akulik Creek
- Alagnak River
- Alatna River
- Alsek River
- Ambler River
- American Creek
- American River
- Anaktuvuk River
- Anchor River
- Andreafsky River
- Aniak River
- Aniakchak River
- Anisak River
- Aniuk River
- Anvil Creek
- Another River
- Anvik River
- Arolik River
- Atchuelinguk River
- Atigun River
- Atlasta Creek
- Avalik River
- Awuna River
- Ayakulik River
- Ayiyak River
- Azun River
- Babel River
- Bearpaw River
- Beaver Creek (Yukon River tributary)
- Beaver Creek (White River tributary, Alaska)
- Behm River
- Beluga River
- Bering River
- Big River
- Birch Creek (Kantishna River tributary)
- Birch Creek (Yukon River tributary)
- Black River (Yukon Delta)
- Blue River
- Bonanza River
- Bonasila River
- Bremner River
- Buckland River
- Canning River
- Caribou River
- Chakachatna River
- Chandalar River
- Chandler River
- Charley River
- Chatanika River
- Chena River
- Chickaloon River (Matanuska River tributary)
- Chickaloon River (Chickaloon Bay)
- Chickamin River
- Chignik River
- Chilikadrotna River
- Chilkat River
- Chilkoot River
- Chisana River
- Chistochina River
- Chitanana River
- Chitina River
- Christian River
- Chulitna River (Lake Clark)
- Chulitna River (Susitna River tributary)
- Cinder River
- Ciissinraq River
- Clearwater River
- Coleen River
- Colville River
- Copper River
- Cosna River
- Cutler River
- Dago Creek
- Dall River
- Delta Creek
- Delta River
- Demon Creek
- Deshka River
- Dick Dale Creek
- Dishna River
- Dog Salmon River
- Draanjik River
- Duktoth River
- Dulbi River
- Eagle River
- Echooka River
- Eek River
- Egegik River
- Eklutna River
- Eli River
- Endicott River
- Espenberg River
- Etivluk River
- Firth River
- Fish Creek (Arctic Ocean)
- Fish Creek (Koyukuk River tributary)
- Fish River
- Foraker River
- Fortymile River
- Fox River
- Gakona River
- George River
- Gisasa River
- Goodhope River
- Goodnews River
- Goodpaster River
- Grass River
- Gulkana River
- Gweek River
- Hadweenzic River
- Hammond River
- Hess Creek
- Hodzana River
- Hogatza River
- Hoholitna River
- Holitna River
- Hulahula River
- Huslia River
- Iditarod River
- Igushik River
- Ikpikpuk River
- Imelyak River
- Inaru River
- Indian River
- Inglutalik River
- Inmachuk River
- Innoko River
- Ipewik River
- Ipnavik River
- Itkillik River
- Ivisaruk River
- Ivishak River
- Izaviknek River
- Jago River
- Jim River
- John River
- Johnson River
- Johnson River
- Joshua Green River
- Junjik River
- Kadleroshilik River
- Kahiltna River
- Kamishak River
- Kandik River
- Kanektok River
- Kantishna River
- Kanuti Kilolitna River
- Kanuti River
- Kaolak River
- Karluk River
- Kashunuk River
- Kasilof River

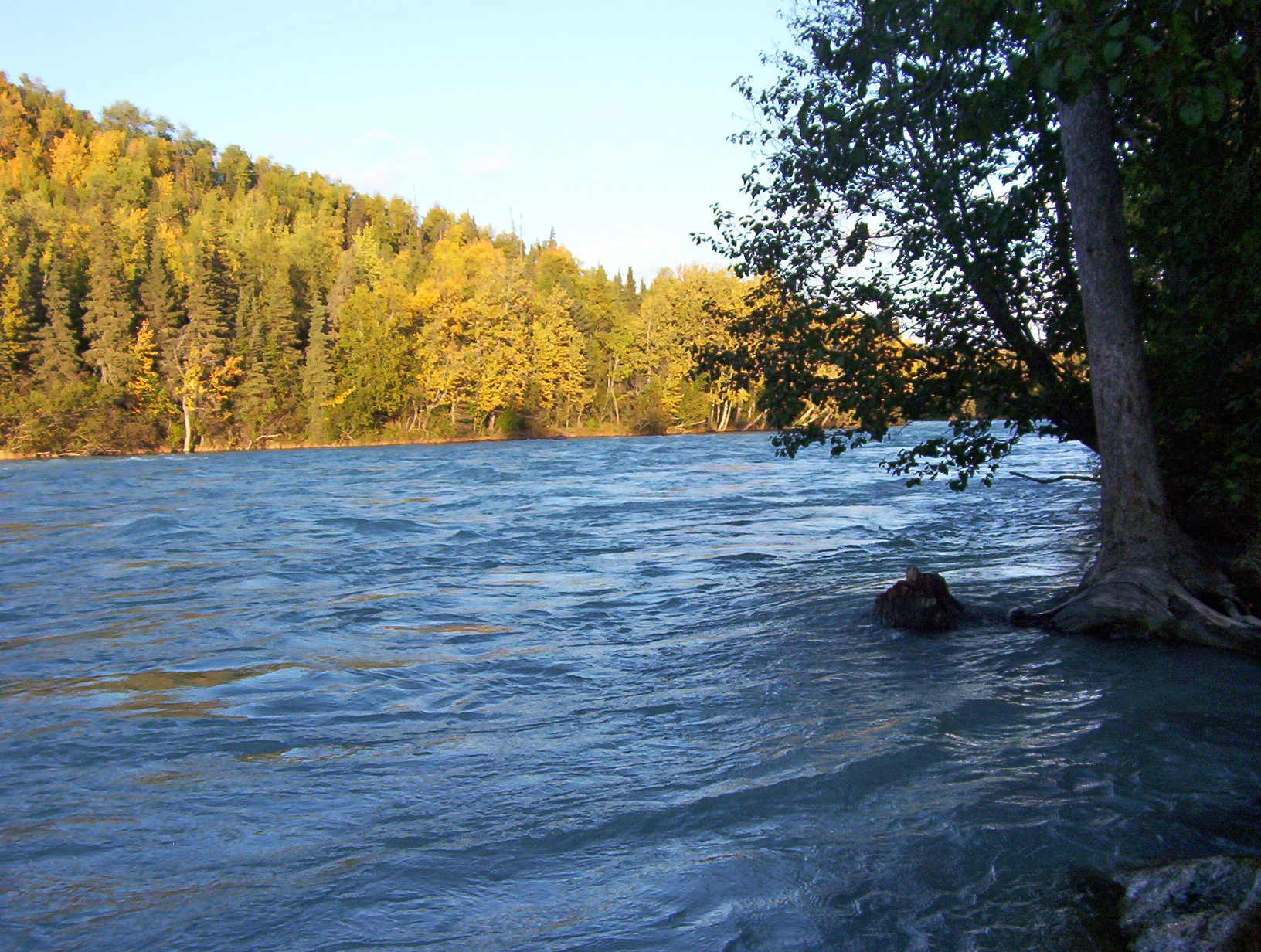
The Kasilof River in autumn

- Kateel River
- Kavik River
- Kelsall River
- Kelly River
- Kenai River
- Ketik River
- Khotol River
- Kiligwa River
- Killik River
- King Salmon River (Nushagak River tributary)
- King Salmon River (Egegik River tributary)
- King Salmon River (Ugashik River tributary)
- Kisaralik River
- Kivalina River
- Kiwalik River
- Klehini River
- Klokerblok River
- Klutina River
- Knik River
- Kobuk River
- Kogoluktuk River
- Kokechik River
- Kokolik River
- Koktuli River
- Kokwok River
- Kolavinarak River
- Koness River
- Kongakut River
- Kougarok River
- Koyuk River
- Koyukuk River
- Kugarak River
- Kugruk River
- Kugururok River
- Kuk River
- Kukpowruk River
- Kukpuk River
- Kun River
- Kuna River
- Kungok River
- Kuparuk River
- Kurupa River
- Kuskokwim River
- Kuzitrin River
- Kvichak River
- Kwethluk River
- Ladue River
- Lake Creek
- Little Black River
- Little Delta River
- Little Melozitna River
- Little Nelchina River
- Little Susitna River
- Louse Creek
- Lowe River
- MacLaren River
- Manokinak River
- Martin River

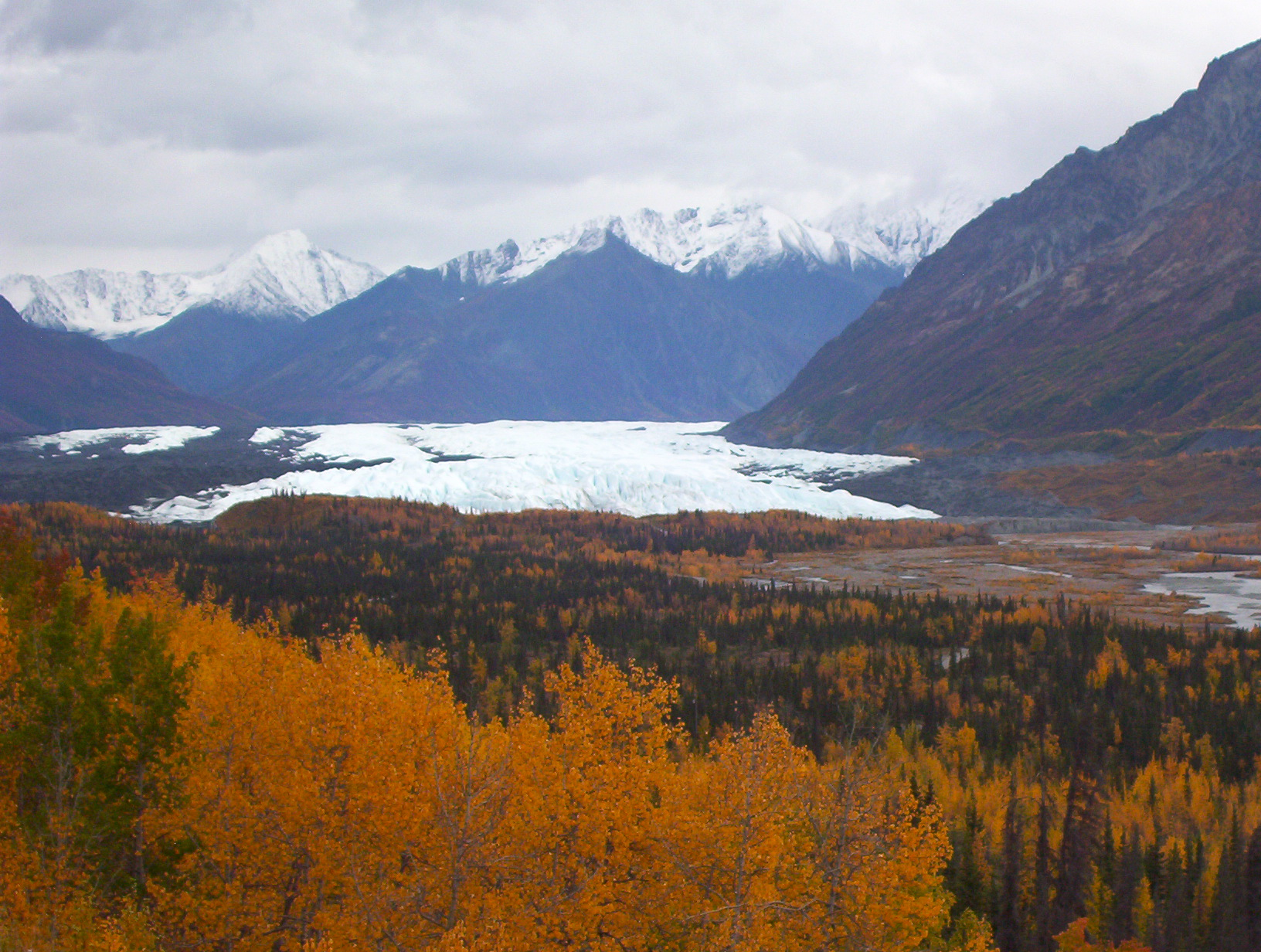
Matanuska Glacier in the Chugach Mountains is the source of the Matanuska river

- Matanuska River
- Mauneluk River
- McArthur River
- McKinley River
- McNeil River
- Meade River
- Melozitna River
- Meshik River
- Moose Creek
- Mud River
- Muddy River
- Mulchatna River
- Nabesna River
- Naknek River
- Nanushuk River
- Nation River
- Nelchina River
- Nenana River
- Newhalen River
- Nigu River
- Nimiuktuk River
- Ninglick River
- Ninilchik River
- Niukluk River
- Nizina River
- Noatak River
- North River
- Nowitna River
- Noxapaga River
- Nugnugaluktuk River
- Nuka River
- Nulato River
- Nushagak River
- Nuyakuk River
- Okokmilaga River
- Okpilak River
- Old Crow River
- Oolamnagavik River
- Oshetna River
- Pah River
- Paimiut Slough
- Pastolik River
- Pitmegea River
- Porcupine River
- Porcupine Creek
- Preacher Creek
- Price River
- Quail Creek
- Queer Creek
- Ray River
- Reed River
- Reindeer River (Yukon River tributary)
- Reindeer River (Paimiut Slough)
- Ribdon River
- Sadlerochit River
- Sagavanirktok River
- Salcha River
- Salmon River (Kobuk River tributary)
- Savonoski River
- Selawik River
- Sethkokna River
- Seventymile River
- Shaktoolik River
- Shaviovik River
- Sheenjek River
- Ship Creek
- Siksikpuk River
- Sixtymile River
- Skagway River
- Skwentna River
- Snake River
- Snow River
- Squirrel River
- Stariski Creek
- Stikine River
- Stony River
- Strangle Woman Creek
- Stuyahok River (Bonasila River tributary)
- Stuyahok River (Mulchatna River tributary)
- Sulatna River
- Susitna River
- Susulatna River
- Swanson River
- Swift River
- Tagagawik River
- Taiya River
- Takotna River
- Taku River
- Talachulitna River
- Talkeetna River
- Tana River

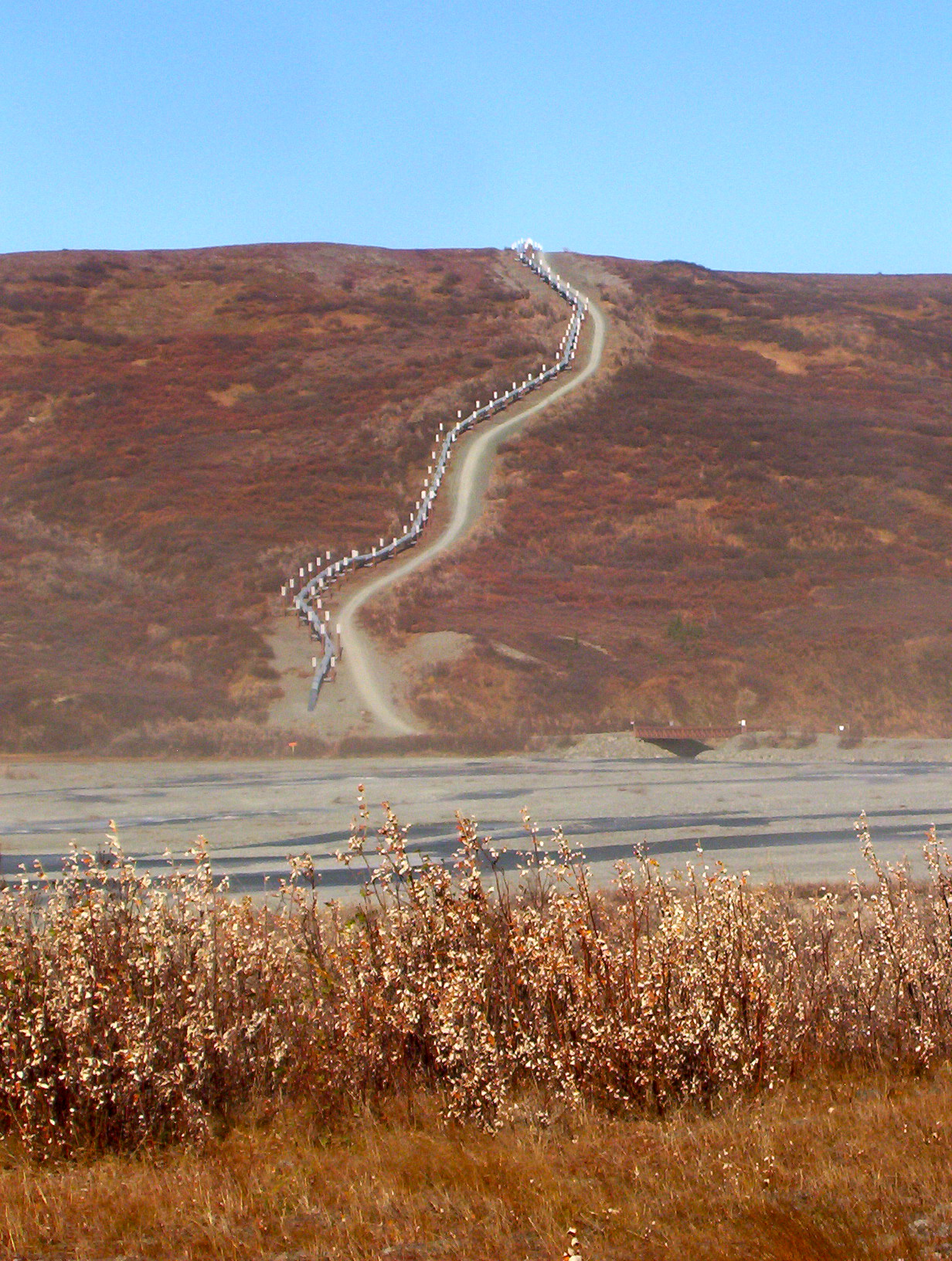
Buried crossing of the Trans-Alaska Pipeline on the Tanana River

- Tanana River
- Tasnuna River
- Tatonduk River
- Tazlina River
- Teklanika River
- Tetlin River
- Tiekel River
- Tikchik River
- Tinayguk River
- Titaluk River
- Titna River
- Tlikakila River
- Togiak River
- Tok River
- Toklat River
- Tokositna River
- Tolovana River
- Tonsina River
- Tonzona River
- Toolik River
- Topagoruk River
- Tozitna River
- Tsirku River
- Tubutulik River
- Tuluksak River
- Twentymile River in Chugach National Forest
- Tyone River
- Ugashik River
- Unalakleet River
- Ungalik River
- Unuk River
- Usuktuk River
- Utukok River
- Wetbutt Creek
- White River
- Whiting River
- Wild River
- Wind River
- Wood River (Tanana River tributary)
- Wood River (Nushagak River tributary)
- Wulik River
- Yahtse River
- Yentna River
- Yetna River
- Yuki River
- Yukon River
- Zitiana River

== See also ==
- List of islands of Alaska
- List of lakes of Alaska
- List of rivers of the United States
- List of waterfalls of Alaska

== Notes ==
A: Notes:

USGS GNIS named streams by Borough or Census Area:

# Streams and GNIS query Link	Borough or Census Area
58	Aleutians East
139	Aleutians West (CA)
70	Anchorage
469	Bethel (CA)
10	Bristol Bay
275	Denali
189	Dillingham (CA)
367	Fairbanks North Star
38	Haines
103	Hoonah–Angoon (CA)
113	Juneau
398	Kenai Peninsula
101	Ketchikan Gateway
114	Kodiak Island
181	Kusilvak (CA)
267	Lake and Peninsula
607	Matanuska-Susitna
1389	Nome (CA)
653	North Slope
512	Northwest Arctic
56	Petersburg (CA)
139	Prince of Wales–Hyder (CA)
44	Sitka
15	Skagway
590	Southeast Fairbanks (CA)
679	Valdez–Cordova (CA)
56	Wrangell
52	Yakutat
1953	Yukon–Koyukuk (CA)
9637	TOTAL
