= Bremner Historic Mining District =

Historic district in Alaska, United States

- U.S. National Register of Historic Places
- U.S. Historic district
- Alaska Heritage Resources Survey
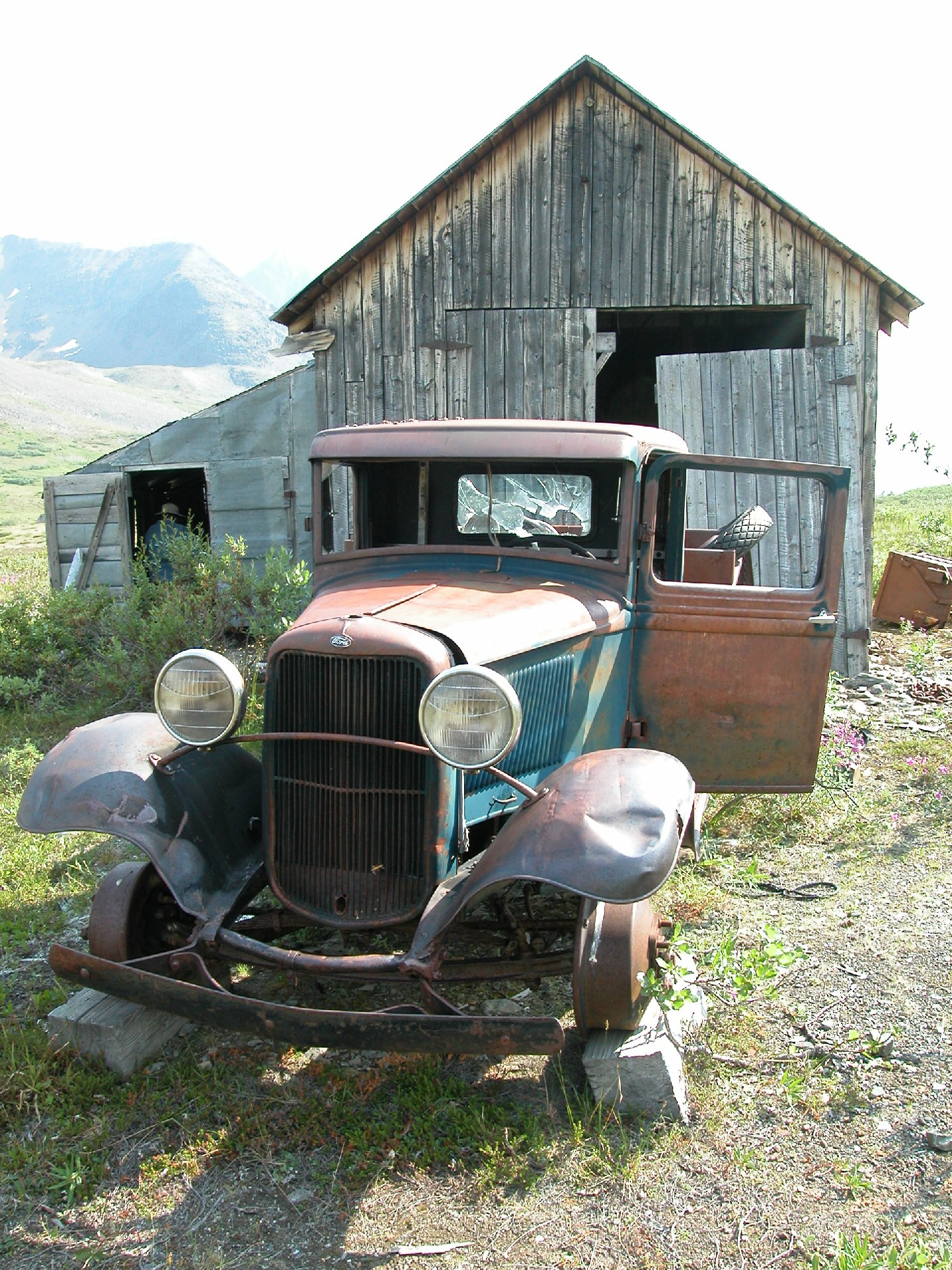

- Location within Alaska
- Location: Along Golconda Creek, about 47 miles (76 km) southeast of Chitina
- Nearest city: Chitina, Alaska
- Coordinates: 61°01′45″N 143°26′20″W
- Area: 13,694 acres (5,542 ha)
- Built: 1934
- Architect: Asa C. Baldwin
- MPS: Mineral Development in Wrangell-St. Elias National Park and Preserve, Alaska MPS
- NRHP reference No.: 00000659
- AHRS No.: XMC-037
- Added to NRHP: June 15, 2000

The Bremner Historic Mining District is a historic district in Wrangell-St. Elias National Park and Preserve in Alaska. It is named after John Bremner, who in 1884–1885 was the first non-native person to live in the area and who prospected for gold along the Bremner River. Located just to the north of the Bremner River, it was the scene of an important placer gold discovery in 1902, and played a key role in the history of the Copper River Basin. Only a few miners struck it rich, but the resulting demand for materials and supplies helped establish regional transportation networks, encouraged supporting industries, and hastened the exploration and settlement of the entire region. While small-scale placer mining continued for over forty years, lode development was largely confined to the period between 1934 and 1941, the district's most significant era.

The Bremner Historic Mining District embodies its period of twentieth-century mining, illustrating both its mining process and its evolutionary sequence. Unusually complete, it retains virtually all of its historic components, including an important placer site, a camp, four discrete lode mines, a mill, and an associated transportation network.

The Golconda Mining Company site, which contains a campsite, an elaborate ditch, and extensive piles of hand-stacked cobble, provides an example of an early placer mining system. The Goldconda complex includes two airstrips dating to the 1930s.

The Yellow Band mining camp is one of the region's most complete, not only containing the typical housing and office facilities, but a sophisticated hydroelectric system. This camp is also significant for its association with Asa C. Baldwin, a distinguished regional explorer, surveyor, and mining engineer. While working for the U.S. Geodetic Survey, Baldwin completed the first American marine survey of Kodiak and the Aleutian Islands in 1909. From 1910 to 1913, he served as a field officer with the U.S.-Canadian International Boundary Survey. Over the years, Baldwin worked locally as a consulting engineer, where, among other activities, he advised the Kennecott Copper Company and the Copper River and Northwestern Railway. Baldwin began prospecting in the Bremner District in the early 1930s, and from 1936 to 1940, was president of the Yellow Band Mining Company. He acquired the Bremner Gold Mining Company holdings in 1939.

Lucky Girl, Grand Prize, Sheriff, and Yellow Band Mines are examples of remote underground mining operations. With each containing a variety of buildings and structures. While Lucky Girl mill is now ruinous due to repeated avalanche strikes, its operating machinery remains intact and in most cases in situ.

In addition to Baldwin, the Bremner district is associated with aviator Merle "Mudhole" Smith, who started flying supplies for the Cordova Air Service in the 1930s, and who became stuck on the upper Golconda strip. Smith operated Cordova Air Service until 1968, when it merged with Alaska Airlines.

== See also ==
- Kennecott, Alaska, a National Historic Landmark mining town
- National Register of Historic Places listings in Wrangell–St. Elias National Park and Preserve
- National Register of Historic Places listings in Copper River Census Area, Alaska
