= Strangle Woman Creek =

Stream in Yukon–Koyukuk Census Area, Alaska, U.S.

Coordinates: 67°50′52″N 142°15′06″W

Strangle Woman Creek is a stream in Yukon–Koyukuk Census Area, Alaska, in the United States. It is a tributary of the Coleen River.

The name appears to be local in origin and was recorded by the United States Geological Survey in 1956.

== See also ==
- List of rivers of Alaska
