= Chandler River =

Chandler River may refer to:

- Chandler River (New South Wales), Australia
- Chandler River (Maine), U.S.
- Chandler River (Alaska), U.S.

== See also ==
- Chandlers Creek, New South Wales, Australia
