= Ipnavik River =

- Location of the mouth of the Ipnavik River in Alaska
- Native name: Ipnavik (Inupiaq)

Location
- Country: United States
- State: Alaska

Physical characteristics
- Source
  - location: Brooks Range
- Mouth: Colville River
  - location: National Petroleum Reserve
  - coordinates: 68°53′46″N 156°27′30″W
- Length: 68 miles (109 km)

Basin features
- River system: Colville River

The Ipnavik River is a 68-mile-long (109 km) tributary of the Colville River in the Alaska North Slope which was part of the traditional lands of the Iñupiat, who named it "Ipnavak" which means "place where young Dall sheep grow up" with its headwaters in the Brooks Range. The Ipnavik River flows northeast to meet the Colville River 50 miles (80 km). It flows north northeast of Howard Pass, which is the mouth of the Ipnavik. The name was documented by the United States Geological Survey in 1925.

== Etymology ==
The Iñupiat name, Ipnavik means "place where young Dall sheep grow up. Ancient Inupiat hunting structures with arrowhead fragments and piles of caribou bones can still be found on a ridge between Surprise Creek and Kokolik River, near the northernmost point of their route. name of the river was first documented in 1925 by Gerald Fitzgerald of the United States Geological Survey as "Ipnavak" and means in the native language of Alaska as "place where young Dall sheep grow up". The most remote spot in the United States, which is defined by the team as that place farthest from roads and towns" is located "along the Ipnavik River, 120 miles (190 km) from the villages of Ambler and Atqasuk, and about 380 miles (610 km) northeast of Fairbanks."

== Physical description ==
The Ipnavik River is a 68 miles (109 km) long tributary of the Colville River in the Alaska North Slope. Its headwaters are in the Brooks Range. The "Ipnavik River flows northeast to the Colville River, 50 miles (80 km) north northeast of Howard Pass, in the North Slope". "The Ipnavik River (Fig. 29) heads in the Brooks Range and flows northeast 109 kilometres (68 mi) to the Colville River at lat. 68'54'~, long. 156O27'W. It has a drainage area of 1,525 square kilometres (589 sq mi) and an estimated average annual flow of 6.9 m3/sec (245 cfs). The upper Ipnavik is swift and confined to a single channel. The lower river is braided an3 has short, narrow bars. Aquatic vegetation is sparse. The Ipnavik flows clear throughout most of the summer. Water chemistry dsta were: hardness 34 ppm, pH 7, and water temperature 80 °C (176 °F)."

== History ==
The Iñupiat are the indigenous people of the Ipnavik River area. Their ancient hunting structures including arrowhead fragments and "piles of caribou bones" can still be found on the land, for example "on a ridge between Surprise Creek and Kokolik River."

In 2012 Congress was considering designating either all or part of the Ipnavik River for inclusion in the National Wild and Scenic Rivers System along with the a section of the Colville River, and the Awuna River, Etivluk River, Nigu River, Kuna River, Kiligwa River, Nuka River, and Utukok rivers as well as Driftwood and Carbon creeks.

== Fish ==
The fish with the widest distribution in the Ipnavik River is the Arctic grayling Thymallus arcticus, or Sulukpaugaq in the Iñupiat language. It is a "key subsistence species" for the Iñupiat people of the Alaska North Slope, and it is "one of the most important species" for Sport fishing in Alaska.
