= Cinder River =

- Location of the mouth of the Cinder River in Alaska

Location
- Country: United States
- State: Alaska
- Borough: Lake and Peninsula

Physical characteristics
- Source: Aleutian Range, Alaska Peninsula
  - location: Aniakchak National Monument and Preserve
  - coordinates: 56°55′08″N 157°36′31″W
  - elevation: 1,503 ft (458 m)
- Mouth: Bristol Bay
  - location: 136 miles (219 km) northeast of Port Moller
  - coordinates: 57°22′14″N 158°05′51″W
  - elevation: 0 ft (0 m)
- Length: 44 mi (71 km)

The Cinder River is a stream, 44 miles (71 km) long, in southwestern Lake and Peninsula Borough in the U.S. state of Alaska. It begins in Aniakchak National Monument and Preserve and flows northwest into Bristol Bay.

Silver salmon are plentiful in the Cinder River, which drains cinder beds on the flanks of Mount Aniakchak. Accessible mainly by small airplanes that can land on cinder beds or beach sand, the river is lightly fished.

== See also ==
- List of rivers of Alaska
