= Endicott River =

- Location of the mouth of the Endicott River in Alaska

Location
- Country: United States
- State: Alaska
- Borough: Haines

Physical characteristics
- Source: unnamed glacier 2 miles (3 km) south of Mount Young
  - location: Chilkat Range, Tongass National Forest, Endicott River Wilderness
  - coordinates: 58°49′58″N 135°35′23″W
  - elevation: 2,394 ft (730 m)
- Mouth: Lynn Canal
  - location: 25 miles (40 km) northwest of Juneau
  - coordinates: 58°46′41″N 135°14′38″W
  - elevation: 0 ft (0 m)
- Length: 25 mi (40 km)

The Endicott River is a stream, 25 miles (40 km) long, in Haines Borough in the U.S. state of Alaska. Beginning at the base of an unnamed glacier near Mount Young in the Chilkat Range, it flows generally eastward into the Lynn Canal. Most of the river's course lies within the Endicott River Wilderness of the Tongass National Forest. The river mouth is about 25 miles (40 km) northwest of Juneau.

== See also ==
- List of rivers of Alaska
