= Nigikmigoon River =

Stream in Alaska, U.S.

Coordinates: 65.081°N 160.465°W

Nigikmigoon River is a stream in the U.S. state of Alaska. It is a tributary to the Inglutalik River where Coho salmon spawn and Dolly Varden also live and spawn. The remains of an old gold mine lie along the river's east bank. That gold mine still carries the former name of the watercourse, having been called Negromoon Creek. Small quantities of gold were found there, but not enough to make mining worthwhile.

== See also ==
- List of rivers of Alaska
