= Quail Creek (Alaska) =

Stream in Yukon–Koyukuk Census Area, Alaska, U.S.

Coordinates: 65°21′50″N 149°44′05″W

Quail Creek is a stream in Yukon–Koyukuk Census Area, Alaska, in the United States. It is a tributary of Troublesome Creek.

When a party met to name the creek in the late 1890s, they first decided on the name Ptarmigan Creek, but nobody knew how to spell the word 'ptarmigan'. The men then decided to name the stream Quail Creek, for its brevity.

== See also ==
- List of rivers of Alaska
