= Wulik River =

- Location of the mouth of the Wulik River in Alaska

Location
- Country: United States
- State: Alaska
- Borough: North Slope, Northwest Arctic

Physical characteristics
- Source: De Long Mountains
  - location: 5 miles (8 km) north of Sheep Mountain, North Slope
  - coordinates: 68°22′43″N 162°51′45″W
  - elevation: 2,563 ft (781 m)
- Mouth: Kivalina Lagoon, Chukchi Sea
  - location: East of Kivalina, Northwest Arctic
  - coordinates: 67°43′54″N 164°31′01″W
  - elevation: 0 ft (0 m)
- Length: 80 mi (130 km)

The Wulik River (Iñupiaq: Ualliik kuuŋak) is a stream, about 80 miles (130 km) long, in the northwestern part of the U.S. state of Alaska. Originating in the De Long Mountains in the North Slope Borough, it flows southwest to Kivalina Lagoon in the Chukchi Sea, east of Kivalina. It heads in the De Long Mountains, which is 5 miles (8 km) north of Sheep Mountain, and it is 42 miles (67 km) northwest of Noatak.

Umiak Bend, along the river and 8 miles (13 km) northwest of Kivalina, was named after an Inuit skin boat (umiak) was destroyed there by rough water.

In 1886, a United States Navy lieutenant reported the Inuit name of this river as "Woleek."

== See also ==
- List of rivers of Alaska
