= Troublesome Creek (Hess Creek tributary) =

Stream in Yukon–Koyukuk Census Area, Alaska, U.S.

Coordinates: 65°43′03″N 149°28′21″W

Troublesome Creek is a stream in Yukon–Koyukuk Census Area, Alaska, in the United States. It is a tributary of Hess Creek.

Troublesome Creek was named by prospectors. The area around the creek was known by the pioneers as "Troublesome country" for its steep and rocky terrain.

== See also ==
- List of rivers of Alaska
