= Queer Creek (Alaska) =

Stream in Matanuska-Susitna Borough, Alaska, U.S.

Coordinates: 62°11′25″N 150°11′15″W

Queer Creek is a stream in Matanuska-Susitna Borough, Alaska, in the United States. It is 4 miles (6.4 km) in length.

== See also ==
- List of rivers of Alaska
