= Draanjik River =

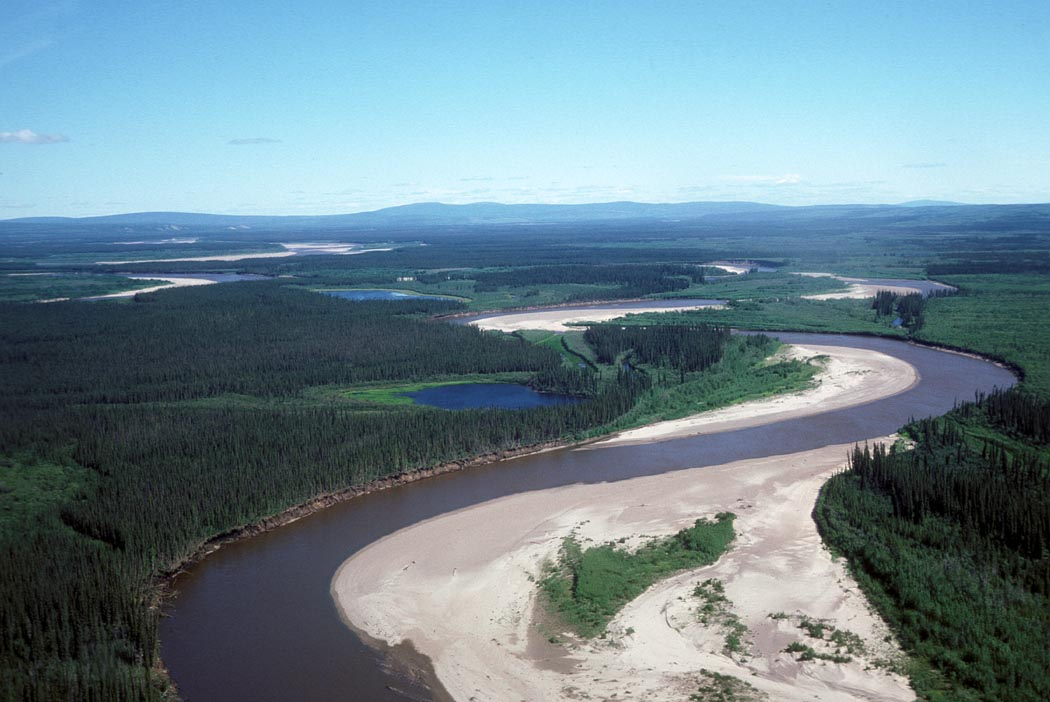
- Aerial view of the Draanjik River

- Location of the mouth of the Black River in Alaska

Location
- Country: United States
- State: Alaska
- Census Area: Yukon–Koyukuk

Physical characteristics
- Source
  - coordinates: 65°33′33″N 141°51′19″W
  - elevation: 2,356 ft (718 m)
- Mouth: Black River Slough, Porcupine River
  - location: 16 miles (26 km) northeast of Fort Yukon, Yukon Flats National Wildlife Refuge
  - coordinates: 66°39′51″N 144°43′40″W
  - elevation: 440 ft (130 m)
- Length: 160 mi (260 km)

The Draanjik or Black River is a river in eastern Yukon-Koyukuk Census Area, Alaska, United States. It flows generally northwest 160 miles (260 km) from its source to its mouth on the Black River Slough of the Porcupine River near the city of Fort Yukon. In January 2014, the Alaska Historical Commission voted to rename the river to Draanjik, its Gwich'in name, a decision which later found approval by the Board of Geographic Names.

The local Gwich'in name for the river is "Draanjik," which translates as "Caches Along The River." The river gives its name to the Draanjik Gwich'in of Chalkyitsik.

The river has borne several other names: Big Black River (in order to distinguish it from similarly named streams), Orange Creek, Salmon Fork, Salmon River, Squirrel Creek, and Squirrel River. The Board on Geographic Names officially ruled in favor of "Black River" in 1959.

== See also ==
- List of rivers of Alaska
