= Joshua Green River =

River in Alaska, the United States of America

- Location of the mouth of the Joshua Green River in Alaska

Location
- Country: United States
- State: Alaska
- Borough: Aleutians East

Physical characteristics
- Source: Aleutian Range
  - location: Izembek Wilderness
  - coordinates: 55°20′20″N 162°28′00″W
  - elevation: 13 ft (4.0 m)
- Mouth: Bristol Bay on the Bering Sea
  - location: 17 miles (27 km) northeast of Cold Bay
  - coordinates: 55°23′30″N 162°29′10″W
  - elevation: 7 ft (2.1 m)
- Length: 15 mi (24 km)

The Joshua Green River is a stream, 15 miles (24 km) long, in the Aleutians East Borough of the U.S. state of Alaska. It flows generally northwest across the Izembek National Wildlife Refuge from its source in the Aleutian Range of the Alaska Peninsula into Moffet Lagoon, Bristol Bay, on the Bering Sea. The river's mouth is 17 miles (27 km) northeast of Cold Bay.

== See also ==
- List of rivers of Alaska
