= Ivishak River =

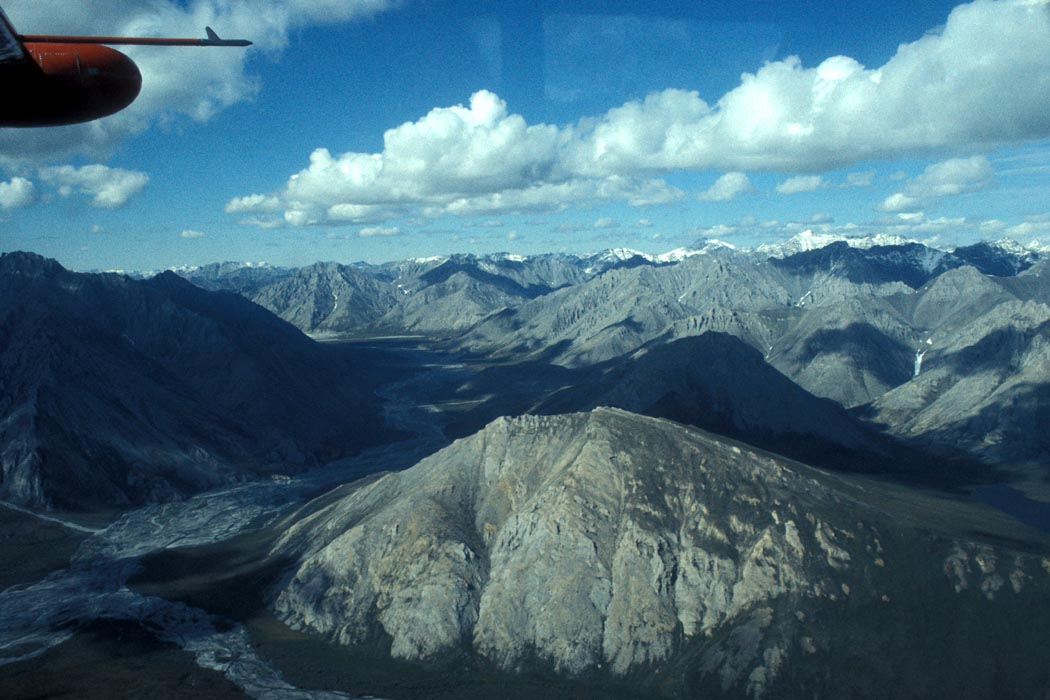
- Upper Ivishak River Valley

- Location of the mouth of the Ivishak River in Alaska

Location
- Country: United States
- State: Alaska
- Borough: North Slope

Physical characteristics
- Source: Philip Smith Mountains
  - location: Brooks Range
  - coordinates: 68°34′25″N 147°16′43″W
  - elevation: 5,258 ft (1,603 m)
- Mouth: Sagavanirktok River
  - location: 55 miles (89 km) south of Prudhoe Bay
  - coordinates: 69°29′55″N 148°30′22″W
  - elevation: 538 ft (164 m)
- Length: 95 mi (153 km)

National Wild and Scenic River
- Type: Wild
- Designated: December 2, 1980

The Ivishak River /ˈiːviːʃɑːk/ is a 95-mile (153 km) tributary of the Sagavanirktok River in the North Slope Borough of the U.S. state of Alaska. Fed by glaciers at the headwaters, the Ivishak flows northeast, then northwest, through the Philip Smith Mountains and the northern foothills of the Arctic National Wildlife Refuge. It enters the Sagavanirktok River on the coastal plain south of Prudhoe Bay.

On December 2, 1980, 80 miles (129 km) of the Ivishak was designated a National Wild and Scenic River. The protected segments, including the headwaters, an unnamed tributary from Porcupine Lake, and all but the lowermost part of the main stem, lie within the wildlife refuge.

== See also ==
- List of rivers of Alaska
- List of National Wild and Scenic Rivers
