= Kugarak River =

- Location of the mouth of the Kugarak River in Alaska
- Native name: Kuugruaq (Inupiaq)

Location
- Country: United States
- State: Alaska
- District: Yukon–Koyukuk Census Area, Northwest Arctic Borough

Physical characteristics
- Source
  - location: Yukon–Koyukuk Census Area
  - coordinates: 66°58′53″N 159°00′57″W
- Mouth: the Selawik River
  - location: 27 miles (43 km) south east of Selawik, Northwest Arctic Borough
  - coordinates: 66°34′12″N 159°00′57″W
- Length: 58 mi (93 km)

The Kugarak River (Iñupiaq: Kuugruaq) is a stream, 58 miles (93 km) long, in the northwestern part of the U.S. state of Alaska. It flows generally south west and joins the Selawik River approximately 27 miles (43 km) south east of the village of Selawik.

Its Inuit name was first reported in 1886 by U.S. Navy Lieutenant George M. Stoney, who spelled it as "Kue-ga-rack". It was first spelled as "Kugarak" in 1901 by U.S. Geological Survey. The name was also spelled as "Koogarak" and "Kuegerak".

== See also ==
- List of rivers of Alaska
