= Kavik River =

- Location within Alaska

Location
- Country: United States
- State: Alaska
- Region: North Slope

Physical characteristics
- Source
  - coordinates: 69°08′27″N 146°18′17″W
- Mouth: Shaviovik River
  - coordinates: 70°02′43″N 147°19′47″W
- Length: 80 mi (130 km)

The Kavik River is an 80-mile-long (130 km) river in the North Slope region of Alaska. It is swift-flowing and is braided. In winter, parts of the Kavik (and the nearby Canning River) are covered with extensive ice sheets known as aufeis.

The Kavik runs in a wide, flat alluvium-filled valley and is bordered by terraces at a number of levels. Scarring is seen at one site on the southern slope as a result of erosion after vegetation cover was removed by human activity.

The Kavik River flows northwest for 80 miles before joining the Shaviovik River approximately 28 miles southwest of Flaxman Island. The river was named in 1947, by George Gryc of the United States Geological Survey, from the Inupiaq word meaning "wolverine", because a number of these animals were observed in the area.

The river valley is known to provide a habitat for a population of wintering moose and musk oxen. Their presence in the Kavik River valley were identified in the 1970s during an environmental impact assessment for an application to run a natural gas pipeline across Federal-owned land.

On August 12, 2018, the area around the Kavik River was hit by a large earthquake, centered some 42 miles east of Kavik River Camp, at a depth of six miles. At magnitude 6.4, it was the largest ever to have struck the region.

== See also ==
- List of rivers of Alaska
- Life Below Zero
