= Kuk River =

- Location of the mouth of the Kuk River in Alaska
- Etymology: river
- Native name: Kuuk (Inupiaq)

Location
- Country: United States
- State: Alaska
- Borough: North Slope

Physical characteristics
- Source: Confluence of Kaolak and Avalik rivers
  - location: National Petroleum Reserve–Alaska
  - coordinates: 70°07′19″N 159°40′16″W
  - elevation: 8 ft (2.4 m)
- Mouth: Wainwright Inlet, Arctic Ocean
  - location: 6 miles (10 km) southeast of Wainwright
  - coordinates: 70°36′29″N 160°06′40″W
  - elevation: 0 ft (0 m)
- Length: 35 mi (56 km)

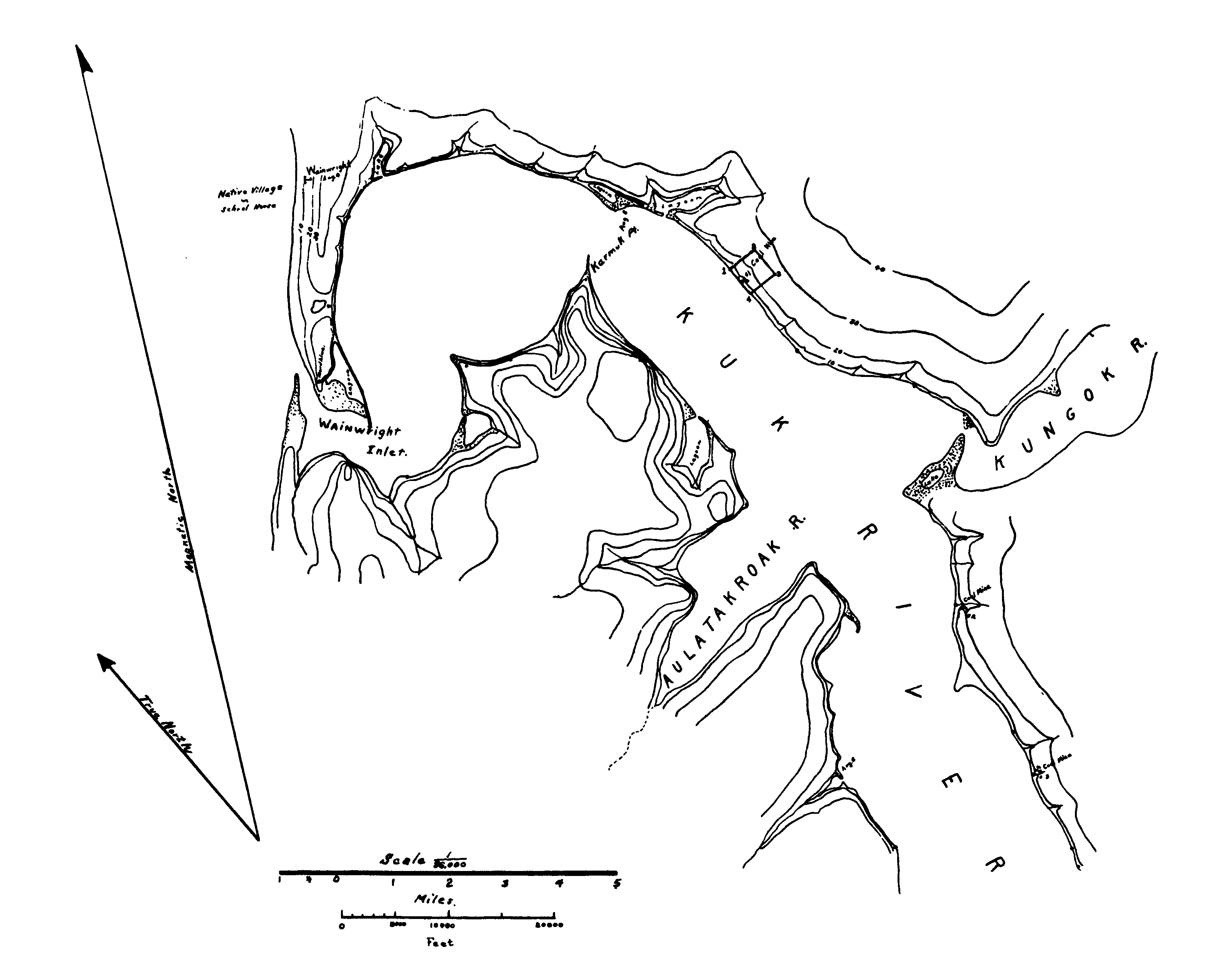
Kuk river illustration 1930

The Kuk River (Iñupiaq: Kuuk) is a 35-mile (56 km) long stream in the North Slope Borough of the U.S. state of Alaska. It heads at the confluence of the Avalik and Kaolak rivers and flows north to Wainwright Inlet, 6 miles (10 km) southeast of Wainwright. The inlet links to the Chukchi Sea of the Arctic Ocean.

Kuuk means river in the Iñupiaq language. Nineteenth century maps variously listed streams entering the Wainwright Inlet as "Koh", "Kong", "Tutua Wing", "Ku", "Kook", "Koo", and "Kee".

== See also ==
- List of rivers of Alaska
