= Kivalina River =

River in Alaska, the United States of America

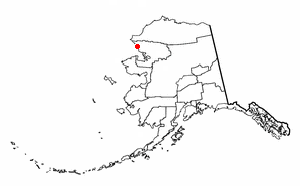
- Location of Kivalina, Alaska

Location
- Country: United States
- State: Alaska
- Borough: Northwest Arctic Borough

Physical characteristics
- Source
  - location: De Long Mountains
- Mouth
  - location: Kivalina Lagoon
  - coordinates: 67°49′03″N 164°40′46″W
- Length: 60 mi (97 km)

The Kivalina River (Iñupiaq: Kivalliik kuuŋat) is a 60-mile-long (97 km) river in the northwestern part of the U.S. state of Alaska, flowing into Kivalina Lagoon in the Northwest Arctic Borough. It begins in the De Long Mountains and flows southwest 60 miles (97 km) through Kivalina Lagoon to the Chukchi Sea. Its Inuit name was spelled "Kuveleek" by Lieutenant G. M. Stoney, United States Navy, in 1885, and its present spelling was adopted in 1904.

The village of Kivalina is located on a reef at the mouth of the river.

== See also ==
- List of rivers of Alaska
