= Babel River =

Stream in Bethel Census Area, Alaska, U.S.

Coordinates: 61°37′15″N 154°42′00″W

Babel River is a stream in Bethel Census Area, Alaska, in the United States.

Babel River was named for the Tower of Babel after much confusion regarding its name.

== See also ==
- List of rivers of Alaska
