= Etivluk River =

- Location of the mouth of the Etivluk River in Alaska

Location
- Country: United States
- State: Alaska
- Borough: North Slope

Physical characteristics
- Source: Nigtun Lake
  - location: Near Howard Pass, Howard Hills, National Petroleum Reserve, Brooks Range
  - coordinates: 68°13′41″N 156°52′33″W
  - elevation: 1,626 ft (496 m)
- Mouth: Colville River
  - location: Upstream of Awuna River mouth, Arctic Slope Regional Corporation lands
  - coordinates: 68°57′12″N 155°57′22″W
  - elevation: 853 ft (260 m)
- Length: 56 mi (90 km)

The Etivluk River is a 56-mile (90 km) tributary of the Colville River in the U.S. state of Alaska. A bend in the river about 15 miles (24 km) from the mouth has been identified as one of the most remote locations in mainland Alaska. It is about 120 miles (190 km) from the nearest towns of Ambler to the southwest and Atqasuk to the north and farther from any other settled area in the state.

The river begins at Nigtun Lake and flows generally to the north-northeast before joining the Colville River. The Nigu River enters the Etivluk from the right near its headwaters, and the joined rivers are sometimes referred to as the Etivluk-Nigu River. The entire length of the Etivluk flows through a remote area of northern Alaska, entirely north of the Arctic Circle.

== See also ==
- List of rivers of Alaska
