= Bonasila River =

- Location of the mouth of the Bonasila River in Alaska
- Etymology: Down below creek
- Native name: Ngidegh Srixno' (Degexit'an)

Location
- Country: United States
- State: Alaska
- Census Area: Yukon–Koyukuk

Physical characteristics
- Source: Nulato Hills
  - coordinates: 62°56′26″N 161°12′18″W
  - elevation: 1,783 ft (543 m)
- Mouth: Yukon River
  - location: Bonasila Slough near Elkhorn Island, 27 miles (43 km) northwest of Holy Cross
  - coordinates: 62°31′58″N 160°12′34″W
  - elevation: 26 ft (7.9 m)
- Length: 125 mi (201 km)

The Bonasila River (Deg Xinag: Ngidegh Srixno') is a 125-mile (201 km) tributary of the Yukon River in the U.S. state of Alaska. It heads in the Nulato Hills and flows generally southeast to the Bonasila Slough, an anabranch of the larger river. The slough flows around the west side of Elkhorn Island, which is about 27 miles (43 km) northwest of Holy Cross, further downstream on the Yukon.

== See also ==
- List of rivers of Alaska
