= Penny River =

- Location of the mouth of the Penny River in Alaska

Location
- Country: United States
- State: Alaska
- District: Nome Census Area

Physical characteristics
- Source: Seward Peninsula
  - coordinates: 64°42′16″N 165°33′21″W
  - elevation: 876 ft (267 m)
- Mouth: Norton Sound, Bering Sea
  - location: 10 miles (16 km) west of Nome
  - coordinates: 64°32′10″N 165°44′20″W
  - elevation: 0 ft (0 m)
- Length: 13 mi (21 km)
- Basin size: 36 sq mi (93 km^{2})

Penny River (also known as Schrader No Name River) is a waterway on the Seward Peninsula in the U.S. state of Alaska. There are several creek tributaries including Willow, Snowshoe and Homestake, from the west; and Quartz and Negsue from the east. Penny River enters Bering Sea a little east of the mouth of Cripple River, and has a drainage area of 36 square miles (93 km^{2})

== See also ==
- List of rivers of Alaska
