= Aichilik River =

- Location of the mouth of the Aichilik River in Alaska

Location
- Country: United States
- State: Alaska
- Borough: North Slope

Physical characteristics
- Source
  - location: Brooks Range
  - coordinates: 69°01′17″N 143°19′32″W
  - elevation: 1,867 ft (569 m)
- Mouth
  - location: Beaufort Sea
  - coordinates: 69°50′24″N 141°07′34″W
  - elevation: 0 ft (0 m)

The Aichilik River is a river that flows through parts of North Slope Borough in the U.S. state of Alaska. it originates on the northern flank of the Brooks Range and flows north, then northwest to empty into the Beaufort Sea northwest of Demarcation Point.

Its Inuit name, Aichillik was referenced by Ernest de Koven Leffingwell in 1918.

== See also ==
- List of Alaska rivers
