= Buckland River =

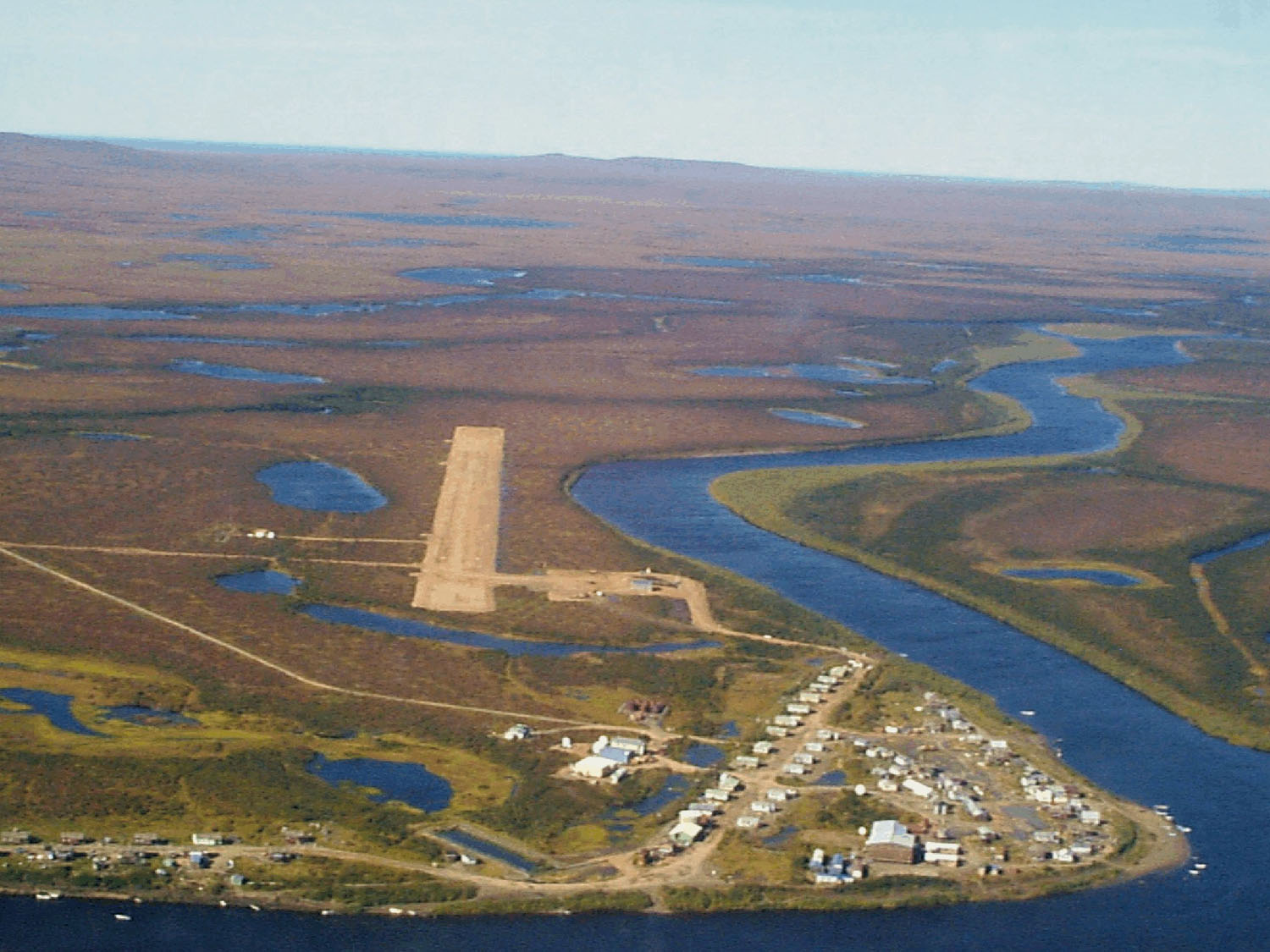

- Location of the mouth of the Buckland River in Alaska

Location
- Country: United States
- State: Alaska
- Borough: Northwest Arctic

Physical characteristics
- Source: Confluence of the river's north and south forks
  - location: South of the Selawik Hills, Seward Peninsula
  - coordinates: 65°45′00″N 160°02′23″W
  - elevation: 146 ft (45 m)
- Mouth: Eschscholtz Bay on Kotzebue Sound of the Chukchi Sea
  - location: 40 miles (64 km) southwest of Selawik
  - coordinates: 66°14′36″N 161°02′39″W
  - elevation: 0 ft (0 m)
- Length: 67 mi (108 km)

The Buckland River (Kaŋiq in Inupiaq) is a stream, 67 miles (108 km) long, in the U.S. state of Alaska. It flows northwest to the Chukchi Sea at Eschscholtz Bay, 40 miles (64 km) southwest of Selawik in the Northwest Arctic Borough.

Naval officer Frederick William Beechey named the river in 1826 for a geology professor at the University of Oxford in England. Other 19th-century names for the river included Russian translations of the Inuit as Kanyk and the Koyukon Indian as Kotsokhotana. Another translation of the Inuit was Kung-uk.

== See also ==
- List of rivers of Alaska
