= Stariski Creek =

Stream in Kenai Peninsula Borough, Alaska, U.S.

Coordinates: 59°53′23″N 151°47′14″W

Stariski Creek is a stream in Kenai Peninsula Borough, Alaska, in the United States. The creek is located at 59° 52' 55" N, 151° 47' 50" W and flows west into Cook Inlet at Cape Starichkof, approximately 19 miles northwest of Homer, Alaska.

"Stariski" is a name derived from the Russian word staryy, meaning "old".

== See also ==
- List of rivers of Alaska
