= Kongakut River =

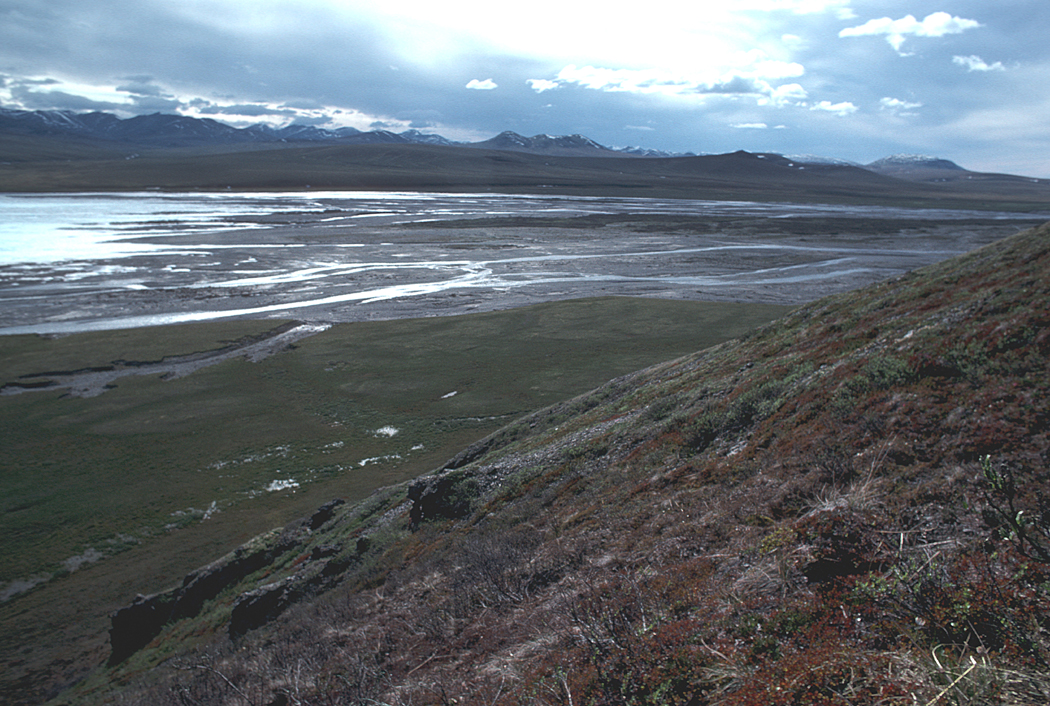
- Kongakut River in summer

- Location of the mouth of the Kongakut River in Alaska

Location
- Country: United States
- State: Alaska
- Borough: North Slope

Physical characteristics
- Source
  - location: Davidson Mountains
  - coordinates: 68°48′47″N 143°22′47″W
  - elevation: 5,521 ft (1,683 m)
- Mouth: Siku Lagoon
  - location: Beaufort Sea
  - coordinates: 69°46′35″N 141°42′16″W
  - elevation: 0 ft (0 m)

The Kongakut River flows through parts of the North Slope Borough in the U.S. state of Alaska. It begins in the Davidson Mountains of the Brooks Range in the northeastern corner of the state, near the border with Yukon Territory in Canada. The Kongakut flows generally northeast and north through the Arctic National Wildlife Refuge to the Beaufort Sea northwest of Demarcation Point. It was formerly sometimes called the Turner River but that name is now applied to a smaller stream in the vicinity due to confusion as to which was originally meant. The name Kongakut comes from the Inupiaq name for the river, meanining roughly "deer pond".

== See also ==
- List of Alaska rivers
