= Akulik Creek =

Stream in North Slope Borough, Alaska, U.S.

Coordinates: 68°58′N 164°04′W

Akulik Creek is a stream in North Slope Borough, Alaska, in the United States. It flows to the Chukchi Sea.

Akulik is derived from an Eskimo word meaning "fancy trimming".

== See also ==
- List of rivers of Alaska
