= Ayakulik River =

River in Alaska, the United States of America

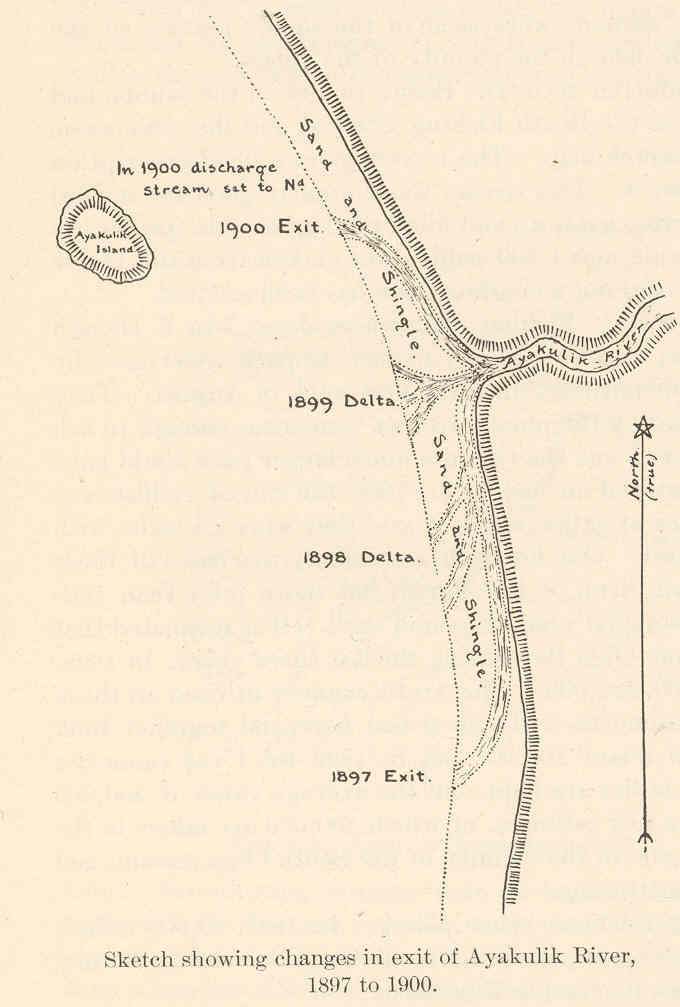
- Sketch showing changes in the exit of Ayakulik River

- Location of the mouth of the Ayakulik River in Alaska

Location
- Country: United States
- State: Alaska
- Borough: Kodiak Island

Physical characteristics
- Source
  - elevation: 85 ft (26 m)
- Mouth: Shelikof Strait
  - coordinates: 57°11′56″N 154°32′10″W
  - elevation: 0 ft (0 m)
- Length: 40 mi (64 km)

The Ayakulik River is the longest river on Kodiak Island in the state of Alaska. It is 40 miles (64 km) long, and possesses the largest drainage of all rivers on Kodiak. It begins near a small lake in the Kodiak National Wildlife Refuge and flows south-southeast through wilderness, before finally turning southwest to empty into the Shelikof Strait. The Ayakulik hosts all five salmon species that exist in Alaska waters. Rafting, hunting, photography, and sport fishing are popular recreational activities on the river in summer.

== See also ==
- List of rivers of Alaska
