= Cosna River (Alaska) =

- Location of the mouth of the Cosna River in Alaska
- Native name: K'osno' (Lower Tanana)

Location
- Country: United States
- State: Alaska
- District: Yukon–Koyukuk Census Area

Physical characteristics
- Source: Bitzshtini Mountains
  - coordinates: 64°24′34″N 152°00′31″W
  - elevation: 1,985 ft (605 m)
- Mouth: Tanana River
  - location: 32 miles (51 km) northeast of Bitzshtini Mountains
  - coordinates: 64°51′16″N 151°21′55″W
  - elevation: 249 ft (76 m)
- Length: 44 mi (71 km)

The Cosna River (Lower Tanana: K'osno) is a 44-mile (71 km) tributary of the Tanana River in the central part of the U.S. state of Alaska. It flows northward from the Bitzshtini Mountains into the Tanana west (downstream) of Manley Hot Springs.

In 1899, Lieutenant J. S. Herron attributed the name to the Tanana peoples living in the area. However linguist William Bright, citing the Koyukon Athabascan Dictionary a century later, attributed the name to the Koyukon words kk'os, schist rock, combined with no', river.

== See also ==
- List of rivers of Alaska
