= Louse Creek (Alaska) =

River in the United States of America

- Location of mouth

Location
- Country: United States
- State: Alaska
- County: Aleutians, Alaska

Physical characteristics
- Mouth
  - coordinates: 51°58′59″N 177°29′01″W

Louse Creek is a stream in Aleutians West Census Area, Alaska, in the United States.

Louse Creek was apparently named by the U.S. Army to correspond with their alphabetical system of naming, because it starts with an L.

== See also ==
- List of rivers of Alaska
