= Martin River =

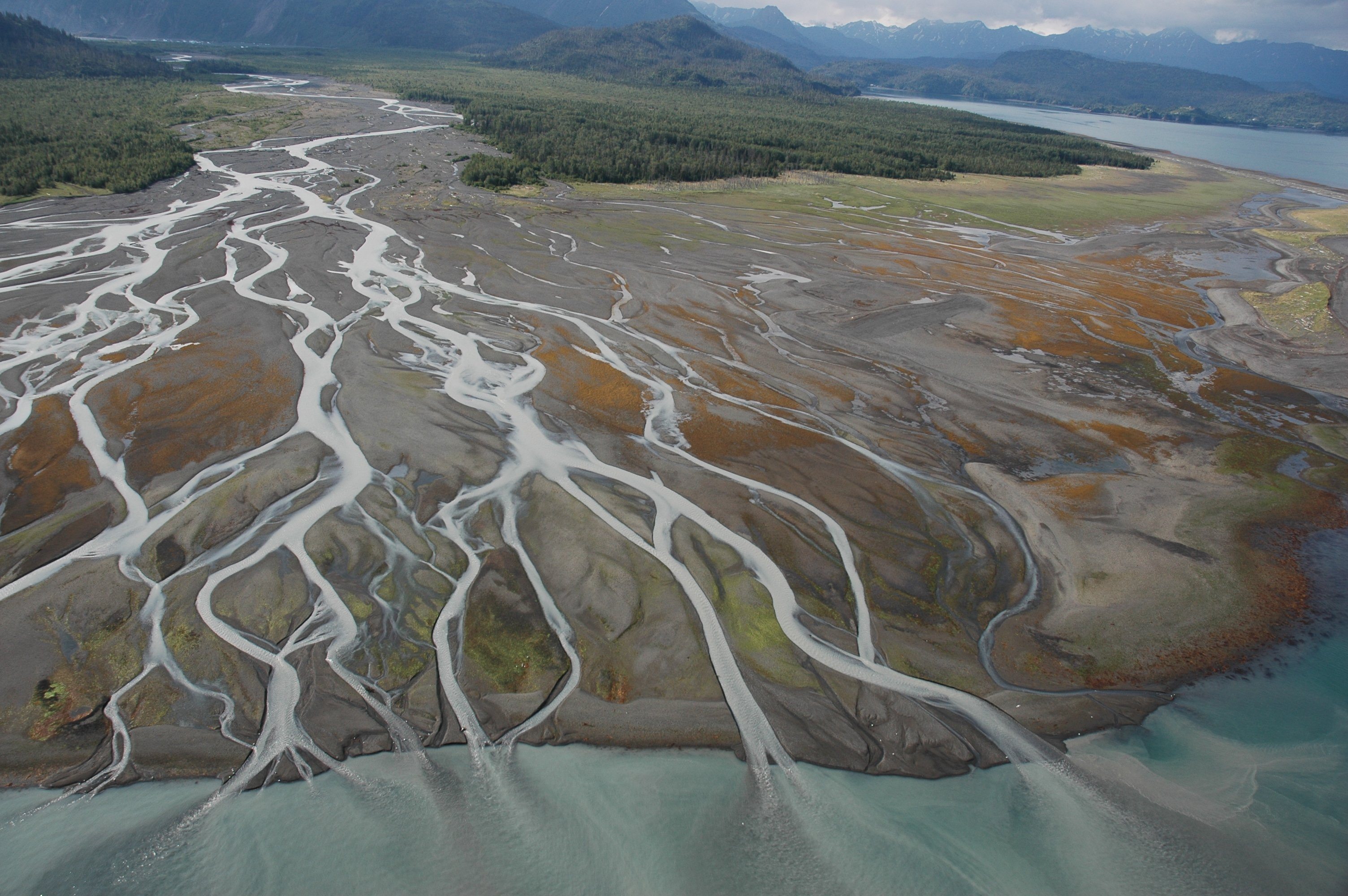

- Location of the mouth of the Martin River in Alaska

Location
- Country: United States
- State: Alaska
- Borough: Kenai Peninsula

Physical characteristics
- Source: Kenai Mountains, Kenai National Wildlife Refuge
  - location: Portlock Glacier
  - coordinates: 59°40′28″N 150°58′02″W
  - elevation: 1,810 ft (550 m)
- Mouth: Kachemak Bay
  - location: 20 miles (32 km) northeast of Homer
  - coordinates: 59°45′46″N 151°00′17″W
  - elevation: 0 ft (0 m)
- Length: 7 mi (11 km)

The Martin River is a stream on the Kenai Peninsula in the U.S. state of Alaska. Beginning at Portlock Glacier in the Kenai Mountains, it flows north for 7 miles (11 km) into Kachemak Bay. The upper river lies within Kenai National Wildlife Refuge. The river mouth is 20 miles (32 km) northeast of Homer.

== See also ==
- List of rivers of Alaska
