= Ciissinraq River =

- Location of the mouth of the Ciissinraq River in Alaska

Location
- Country: United States
- State: Alaska

Physical characteristics
- Source
  - coordinates: 60°55′28″N 164°11′03″W
- Mouth
  - coordinates: 60°52′31″N 164°11′09″W
- Length: 4.8 km (3.0 mi)

Ciissinraq River is a stream in the Yukon Delta National Wildlife Refuge, in the Bethel Census Area, Alaska, United States.

== See also ==
- List of rivers of Alaska
