= Nugnugaluktuk River =

- Location of the mouth of the Nugnugaluktuk River in Alaska

Location
- Country: United States
- State: Alaska
- District: Nome Census Area, Northwest Arctic Borough

Physical characteristics
- Source: Seward Peninsula
  - location: Nome Census Area
  - coordinates: 66°09′24″N 164°48′28″W
  - elevation: 104 ft (32 m)
- Mouth: Goodhope Bay on Kotzebue Sound of the Chukchi Sea
  - location: 37 miles (60 km) northwest of Deering, Northwest Arctic Borough
  - coordinates: 66°11′24″N 164°06′25″W
  - elevation: 0 ft (0 m)
- Length: 26 mi (42 km)

The Nugnugaluktuk River is a stream, 26 miles (42 km) long, on the Seward Peninsula in the U.S. state of Alaska. It flows east from within the Nome Census Area to Goodhope Bay, about 37 miles (60 km) northwest of Deering in the Northwest Arctic Borough. The bay is on Kotzebue Sound of the Chukchi Sea. The entire course of the river lies within the Bering Land Bridge National Preserve.

The river's assigned name comes from the Inuit, as reported in 1903. In 1998, the Inupiat name was recorded as Liglignaqtuugvik.

== See also ==
- List of rivers of Alaska
