= Tagagawik River =

- Location of the mouth of the Tagagawik River in Alaska

Location
- Country: United States
- State: Alaska
- District: Yukon–Koyukuk Census Area, Northwest Arctic Borough

Physical characteristics
- Source
  - location: Yukon–Koyukuk Census Area
  - coordinates: 65°23′01″N 159°12′14″W
- Mouth: the Selawik River
  - location: 30 miles (48 km) south east of Selawik, Northwest Arctic Borough
  - coordinates: 66°27′52″N 159°00′35″W
- Length: 85 mi (137 km)

The Tagagawik River is a stream, 85 miles (137 km) long, in the northwestern part of the U.S. state of Alaska. It flows generally north and joins the Selawik River approximately 30 miles (48 km) south east of the village of Selawik.

Its Inuit name was first reported in 1886 by U.S. Navy Lieutenant George M. Stoney, which he spelled as "Tag-gag-a-wik". The name appeared on a map in 1900.

== See also ==
- List of rivers of Alaska
