= Wind River (Alaska) =

River in Alaska, United States

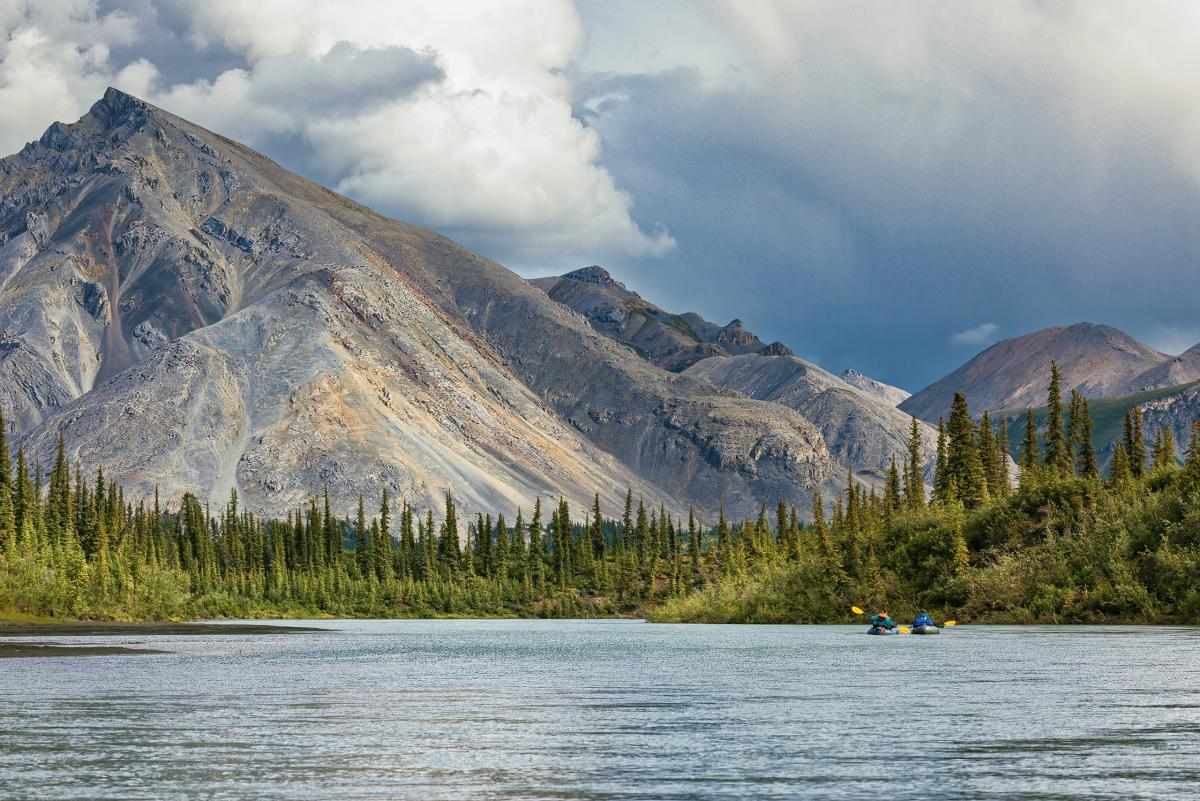
- Wind River

- Location of the mouth of Wind River in Alaska

Location
- Country: United States
- State: Alaska
- District: North Slope Borough, Yukon–Koyukuk Census Area

Physical characteristics
- Source: Philip Smith Mountains of the Brooks Range
  - location: Windy Glacier, Arctic National Wildlife Refuge
  - coordinates: 68°34′31″N 147°24′17″W
  - elevation: 4,798 ft (1,462 m)
- Mouth: East Fork Chandalar River
  - location: 39 miles (63 km) northwest of Christian
  - coordinates: 67°46′36″N 146°09′27″W
  - elevation: 1,699 ft (518 m)

National Wild and Scenic River
- Type: Wild 102.0 miles (164.2 km)
- Designated: December 2, 1980

The Wind River is a tributary of the East Fork Chandalar River in the U.S. state of Alaska. It arises in the Philip Smith Mountains of the Brooks Range and flows into the East Fork and eventually into the Yukon River.

Wind River is a National Wild and Scenic River. The main stem, headwaters, and an unnamed tributary—140 miles (230 km) of streams in total—were designated "wild" in 1980. All lie within the Arctic National Wildlife Refuge.

== See also ==
- List of rivers of Alaska
