= Atlasta Creek =

Stream in Valdez–Cordova Census Area, Alaska, U.S.

Coordinates: 62°04′30″N 146°11′00″W

Atlasta Creek is a stream in the Copper River Census Area, Alaska, in the United States.

"Atlasta Creek took its name from a local roadhouse, that was named when a pioneer woman said in relief, "At last, a house" after the first house in the area was completed.

== See also ==
- List of rivers of Alaska
