= Feather River (Alaska) =

- Location of the mouth of the Feather River in Alaska

Location
- Country: United States
- State: Alaska
- District: Nome Census Area

Physical characteristics
- Source: Seward Peninsula
  - location: Kigluaik Mountains
  - coordinates: 64°52′52″N 165°54′24″W
  - elevation: 2,113 ft (644 m)
- Mouth: Bering Sea
  - location: 38 miles (61 km) northwest of Nome
  - coordinates: 64°50′20″N 166°23′23″W
  - elevation: 0 ft (0 m)
- Length: 17 mi (27 km)

Feather River is a stream, 17 miles (27 km) long, on the Seward Peninsula in the U.S. state of Alaska. Flowing west in the Nome mining district, it debouches a little north of Cape Woolley on the Bering Sea. Its creeks include Livingston, from the east; Thistle and Wills, from the north; and Johnston, from the east.

== See also ==
- List of rivers of Alaska
