= Another River =

River in Alaska

Coordinates: 61°11′15″N 153°00′40″W

Another River is a river located within Lake Clark National Park and Preserve in the Kenai Peninsula Borough, Alaska, in the United States.

The river was so named by S. R. Capps and R. H. Sargent of the USGS in 1927 "because of the many new rivers discovered in this area."

== See also ==
- List of rivers of Alaska
