= Demon Creek =

Stream in Alaska, United States

Coordinates: 64°57′N 163°33′W

Demon Creek is a stream in Nome Census Area, Alaska, in the United States.

Demon Creek was likely named by prospectors in or before 1908, the year in which the name was added to maps.

== See also ==
- List of rivers of Alaska
