= Wetbutt Creek =

Stream in Matanuska-Susitna Borough, Alaska, U.S.

Coordinates: 62°23′10″N 151°10′57″W

Wetbutt Creek is a stream in Matanuska-Susitna Borough, Alaska, in the United States.

The name dates back to at least the 1940s.

== See also ==
- List of rivers of Alaska
