= Coleen River =

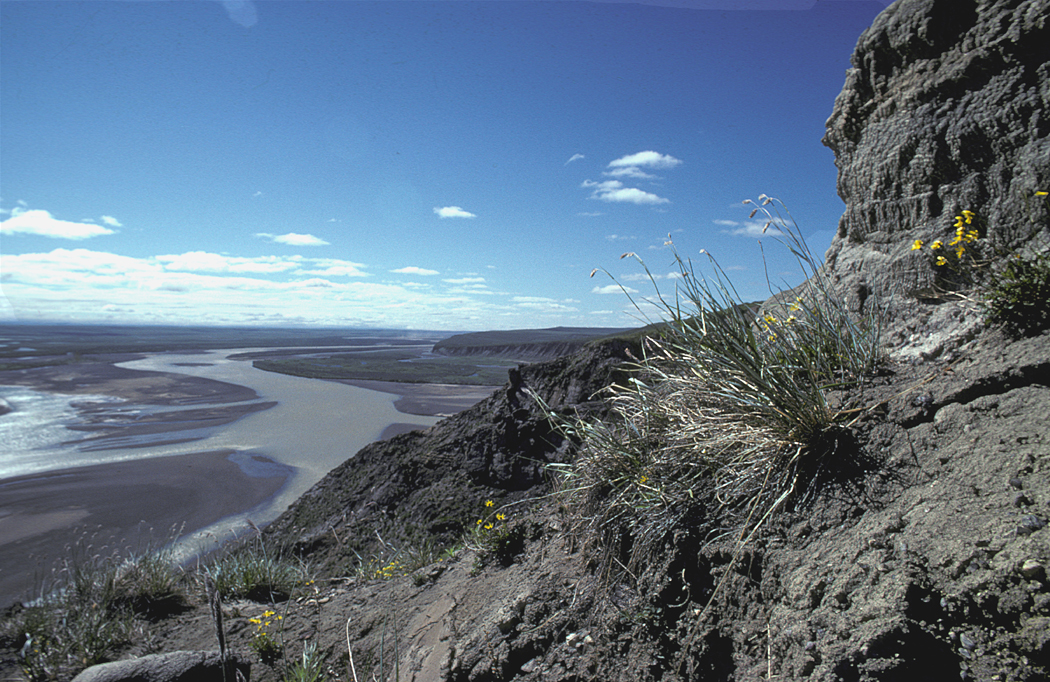
- Coleen River in summer

- Location of the mouth of the Coleen River in Alaska

Location
- Country: United States
- State: Alaska
- Districts: North Slope Borough; Yukon–Koyukuk Census Area

Physical characteristics
- Source: Brooks Range
  - location: Arctic National Wildlife Refuge, North Slope Borough
  - coordinates: 68°42′59″N 143°28′36″W
  - elevation: 4,798 ft (1,462 m)
- Mouth: Porcupine River
  - location: 9 miles (14 km) east of Coleen Mountain, Yukon–Koyukuk Census Area
  - coordinates: 67°04′20″N 142°29′49″W
- Length: 145 mi (233 km)

The Coleen River (/koʊˈliːn/ koh-LEEN) is a 186-mile (299 km) tributary of the Porcupine River in the northeastern part of the U.S. state of Alaska. It begins in the Davidson Mountains in the Arctic National Wildlife Refuge and flows generally south-southeast into the larger river east of Coleen Mountain. Its name comes from the French coline, which means hill.

== See also ==
- List of rivers of Alaska
