= Nuluk River =

River in the United States of America

Coordinates: 65.92778°N 166.87806°W

Nuluk River (alternate Nooluk River) is a waterway on the Seward Peninsula in the U.S. state of Alaska. It enters the Ikpek Lagoon 40 miles (64 km) northeast of Cape Prince of Wales. It heads in the high mountains made up of the Port Clarence limestone about 35 miles south of the Arctic Ocean. For 15 miles (24 km) from its head, the river occupies a canyon, varying from 100–1,000 feet (30–305 m) in depth, cut in Silurian limestones. Fossils have been reported about the head of the river. Northward along its course, the character of the bed rock changes, and calcareous mica-schists are noted. The Silurian limestones dip toward the schists, and near the contact with them, are very highly folded. The coastal plain gravel extends inland farther along the Nuluk River than it does on the other rivers of this region.

Its length is 40 miles.
