= Bremner River =

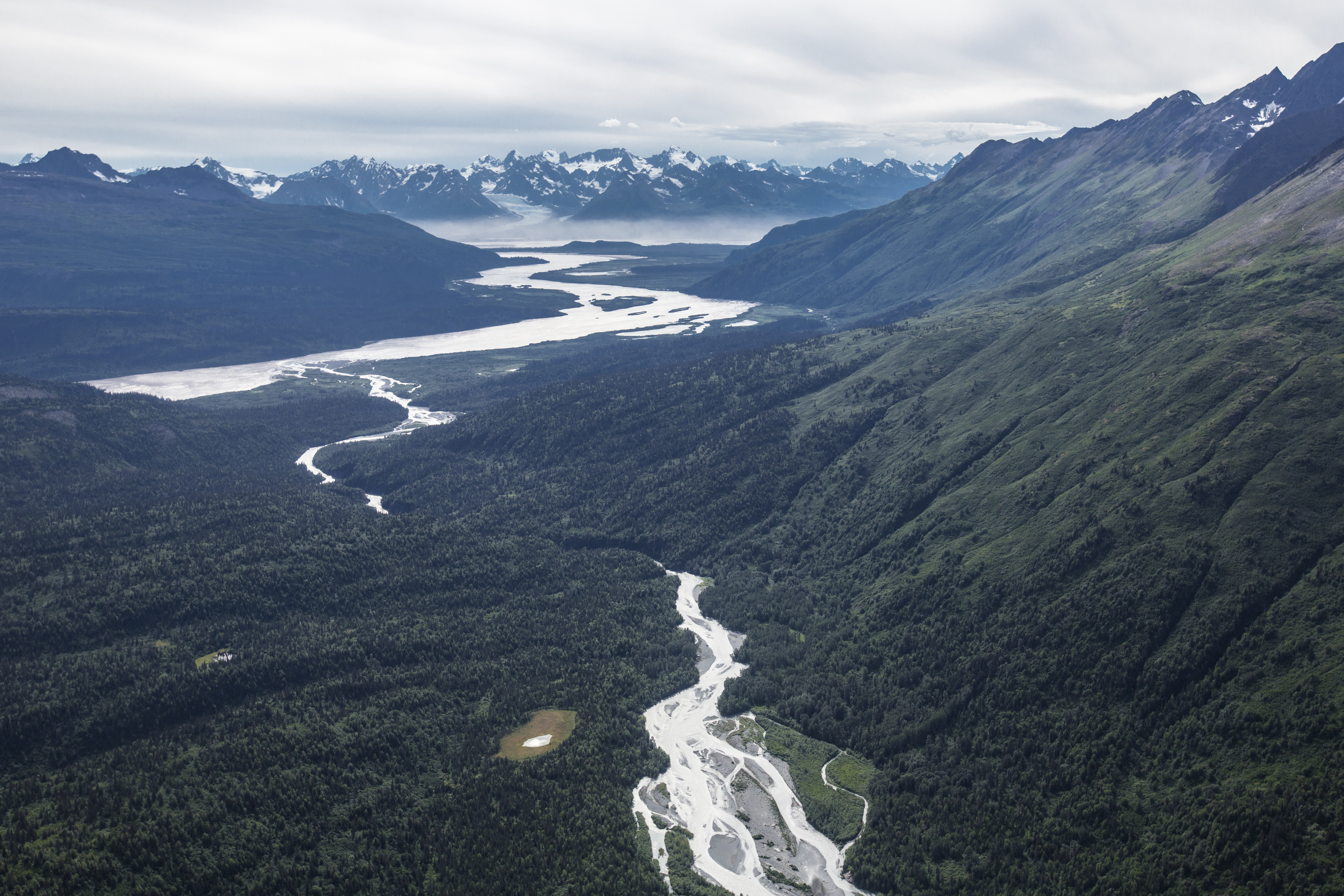
- Bremner River

- Location of the mouth of the Bremner River in Alaska

Location
- Country: United States
- State: Alaska
- Census Area: Chugach

Physical characteristics
- Source: confluence of its north and middle forks
  - location: Chugach Mountains, Wrangell–St. Elias National Park and Preserve
  - coordinates: 60°58′41″N 143°53′36″W
  - elevation: 651 ft (198 m)
- Mouth: Copper River
  - location: 45 miles (72 km) north of Katalla
  - coordinates: 60°50′42″N 144°31′00″W
  - elevation: 174 ft (53 m)
- Length: 40 mi (64 km)

The Bremner River is a 40-mile (64 km) tributary of the Copper River in the Chugach Census Area of the U.S. state of Alaska. It was named in 1885 by Lieutenant H. T. Allen for John Bremner, a prospector who sought gold along the river and was the first non-native person to go there.

Flowing generally southwest from the Chugach Mountains, the Bremner River enters the Copper River 45 miles (72 km) north of Katalla. The North Fork of the Bremner has its headwaters at the Bremner Glacier, which is 8 miles (13 km) long. The entire course of the river lies within Wrangell–St. Elias National Park and Preserve.

== Boating ==
The main stem of the Bremner River below the confluence of its north and middle forks is runnable by boaters who are "seasoned Alaska wilderness travelers with advanced to expert boating skills." Rated Class II (medium) to IV (very difficult) on the International Scale of River Difficulty, the river passes through mountainous terrain and dense forests that make for difficult access and troublesome hiking. Other hazards include cold, swift, silty water; isolation; narrow canyons; brown bears, and strong winds near the mouth.

== See also ==
- List of rivers of Alaska
