= Jago River =

River in Alaska, United States

Coordinates: 70°06′34″N 143°18′23″W

The Jago River /ˈdʒeɪɡoʊ/ is a 90-mile (140 km) river located in the North Slope Borough, Alaska. Its headwaters are in the Brooks Range, and it is named after a Lieutenant Jago of a geological survey. It drains into the Arctic Ocean. It contains deposits of azurite and malachite.

== Gallery ==
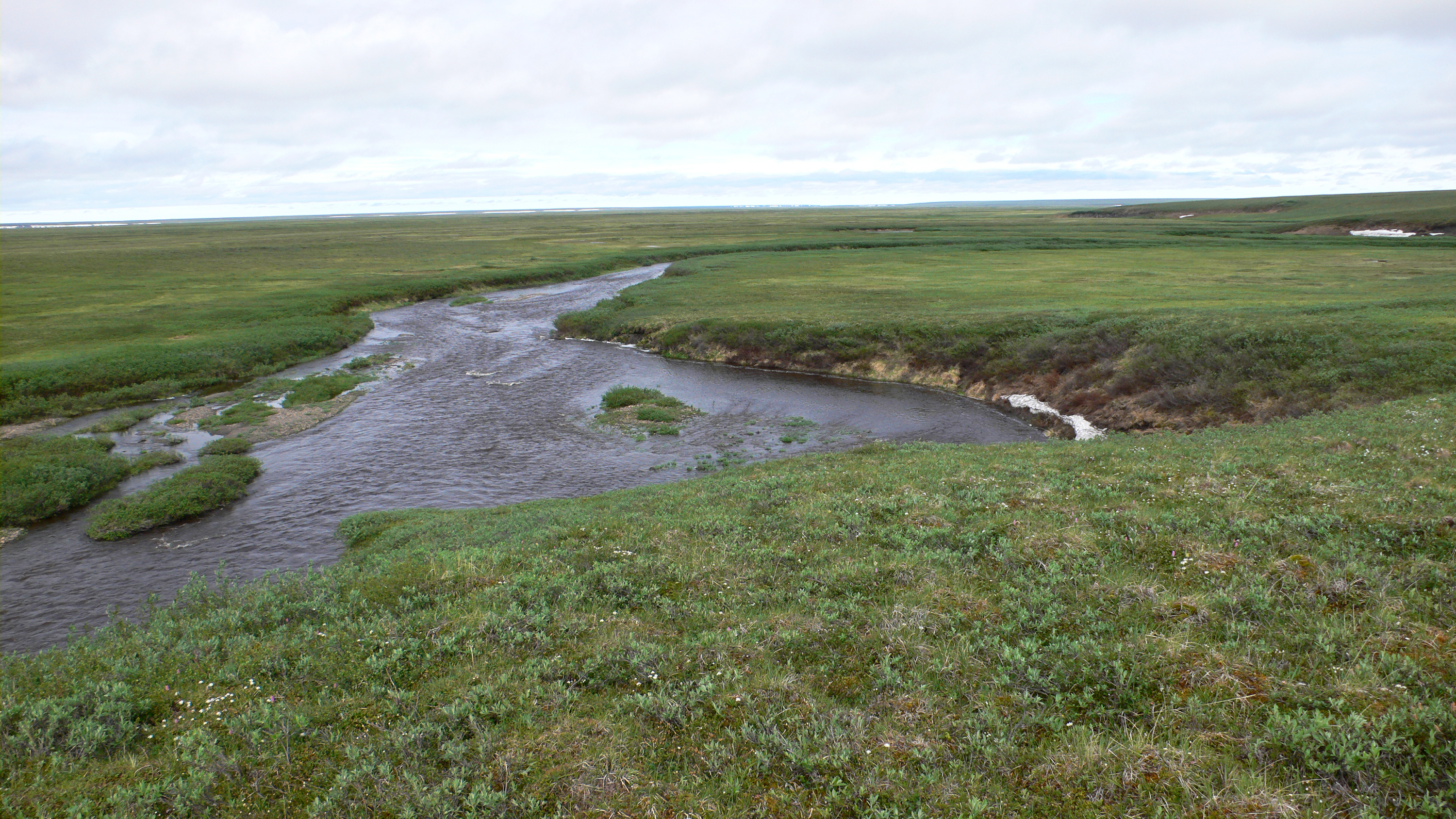
Along Sabbath Creek, a tributary of the Jago River

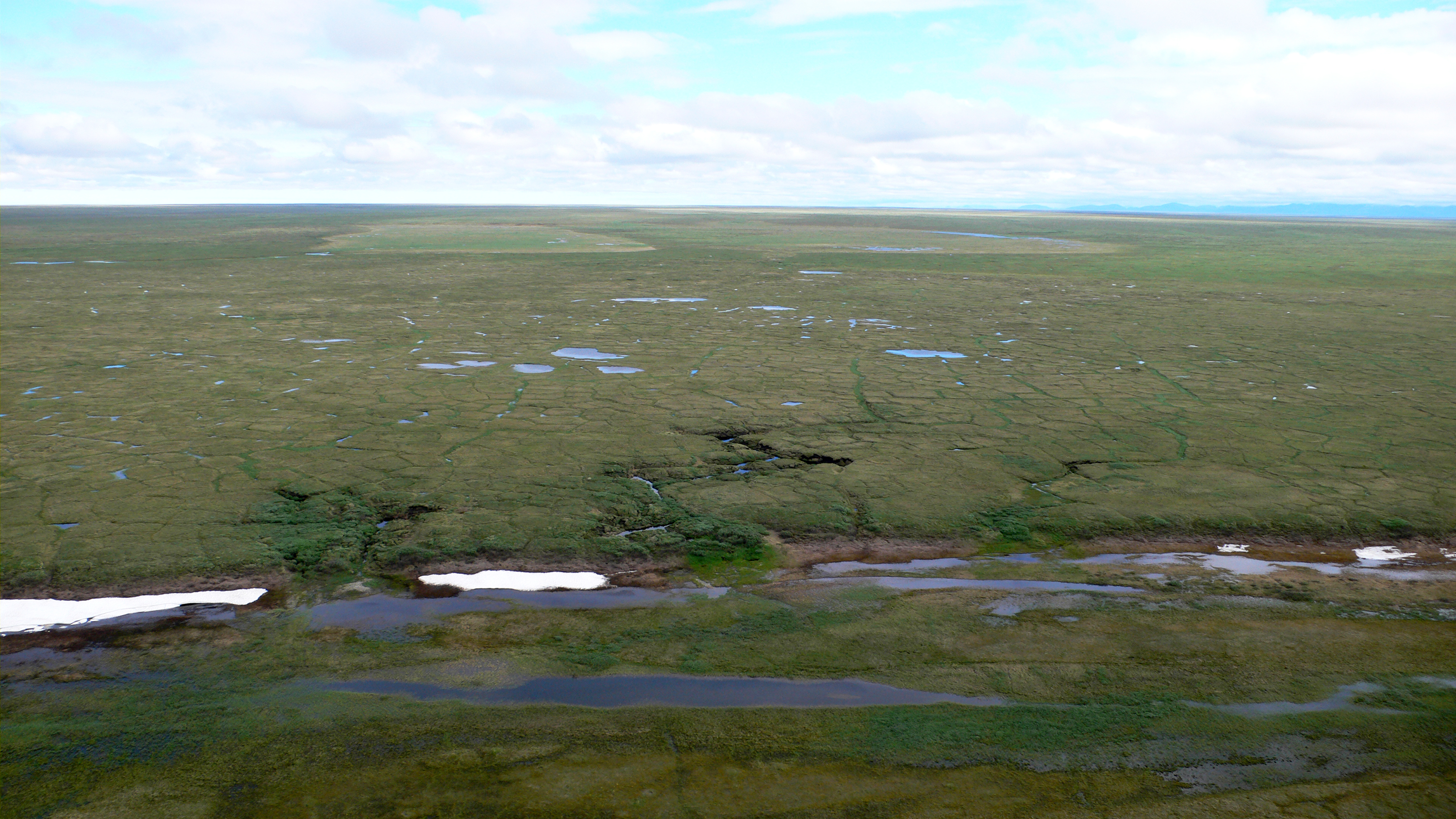
Area near the Jago River
