= Skagway River =

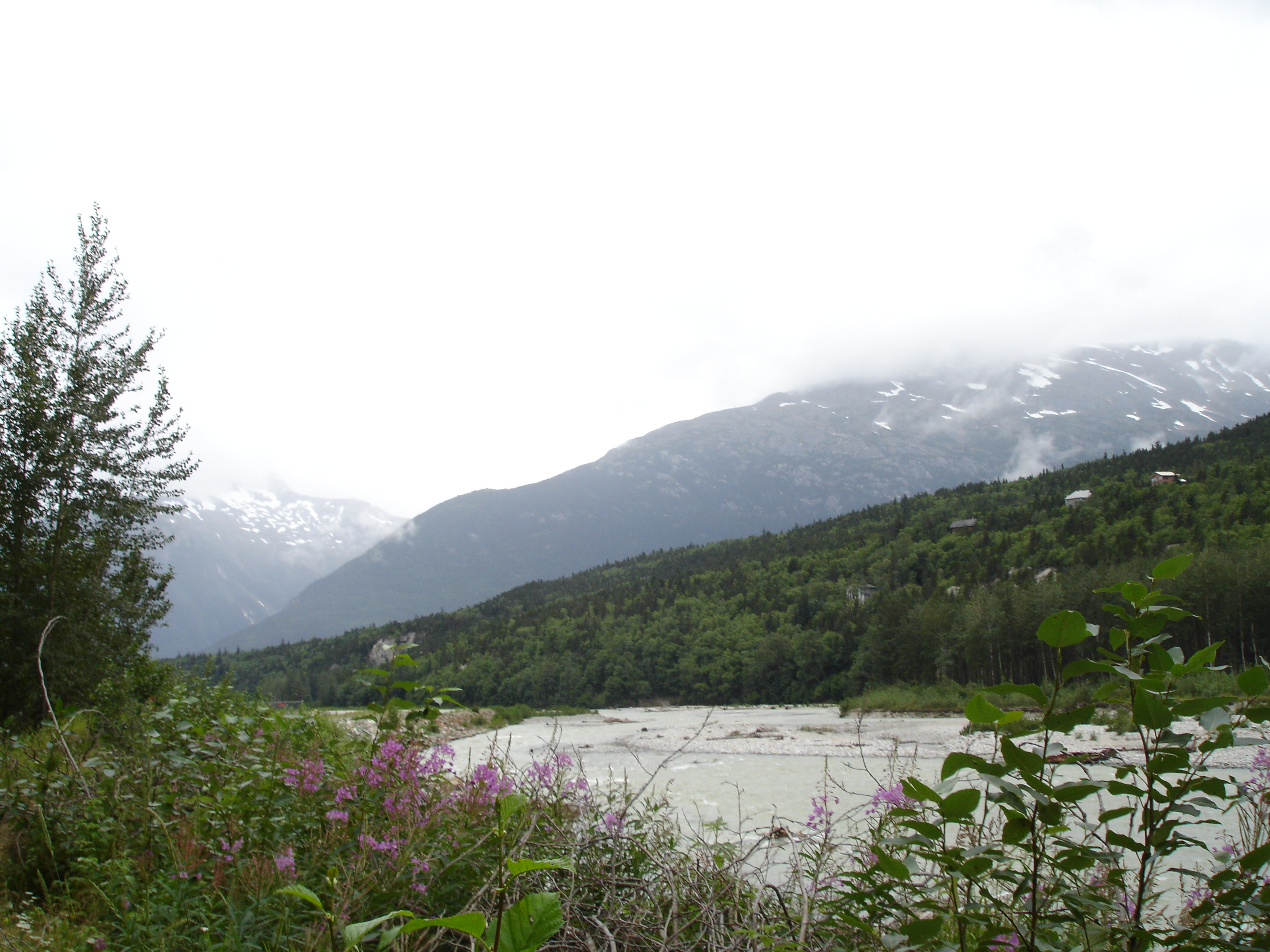
The Skagway River in Alaska

The Skagway River is a river in British Columbia, Canada and the state of Alaska, United States, flowing southwest across the international boundary at 59°32′36″N 135°01′55″W just southeast of the White Pass. Flowing slightly northwest after crossing the boundary, it turns south-southwest to meet the sea at the head of Taiya Inlet. There is a vehicle bridge over the river at the north end of Skagway as well as two pedestrian bridges, one next to the vehicle bridge and one at the mouth of the river near the airport. The river is not navigable by raft or canoe or kayak because of the supports under the vehicle bridge and the shallow swiftly-flowing water. In addition, there is a great quantity of scrap metal debris which has been dumped into the river over the past century. When some people have tried to raft the mile to the ocean, their rafts have been destroyed under the bridge by the accumulation of tree branches and vegetation that is choked there.

Heading north (upstream) from its mouth, there are four major branches of the Skagway River:

== East Fork ==
The East Fork branches off the Skagway River, opposite milepost 4.8 of the White Pass railroad. At milepost 5.8, the railroad makes a U-turn, crosses the East Fork, and loops back to follow the main river.

== White Pass Fork ==
The Skagway River turns to the east and White Pass Fork branches off to the north, opposite milepost 12 of the railroad. At milepost 14.2, the railroad makes a U-turn, crosses the Skagway River, and loops back to follow White Pass Fork.

== Cut-off Gulch ==
White Pass Fork splits into Cut-off Gulch to the east and Dead Horse Gulch to the north, opposite milepost 18 of the railroad. At milepost 18.6, the railroad makes a left turn and crosses Cut-off Gulch.

== Dead Horse Gulch ==
After crossing Cut-off Gulch, the railroad goes through a tunnel which comes out along Dead Horse Gulch. The head of Dead Horse Gulch is at Pump House Lake, at milepost 20 of the railroad.
