= Ribdon River =

River in Alaska, United States of America

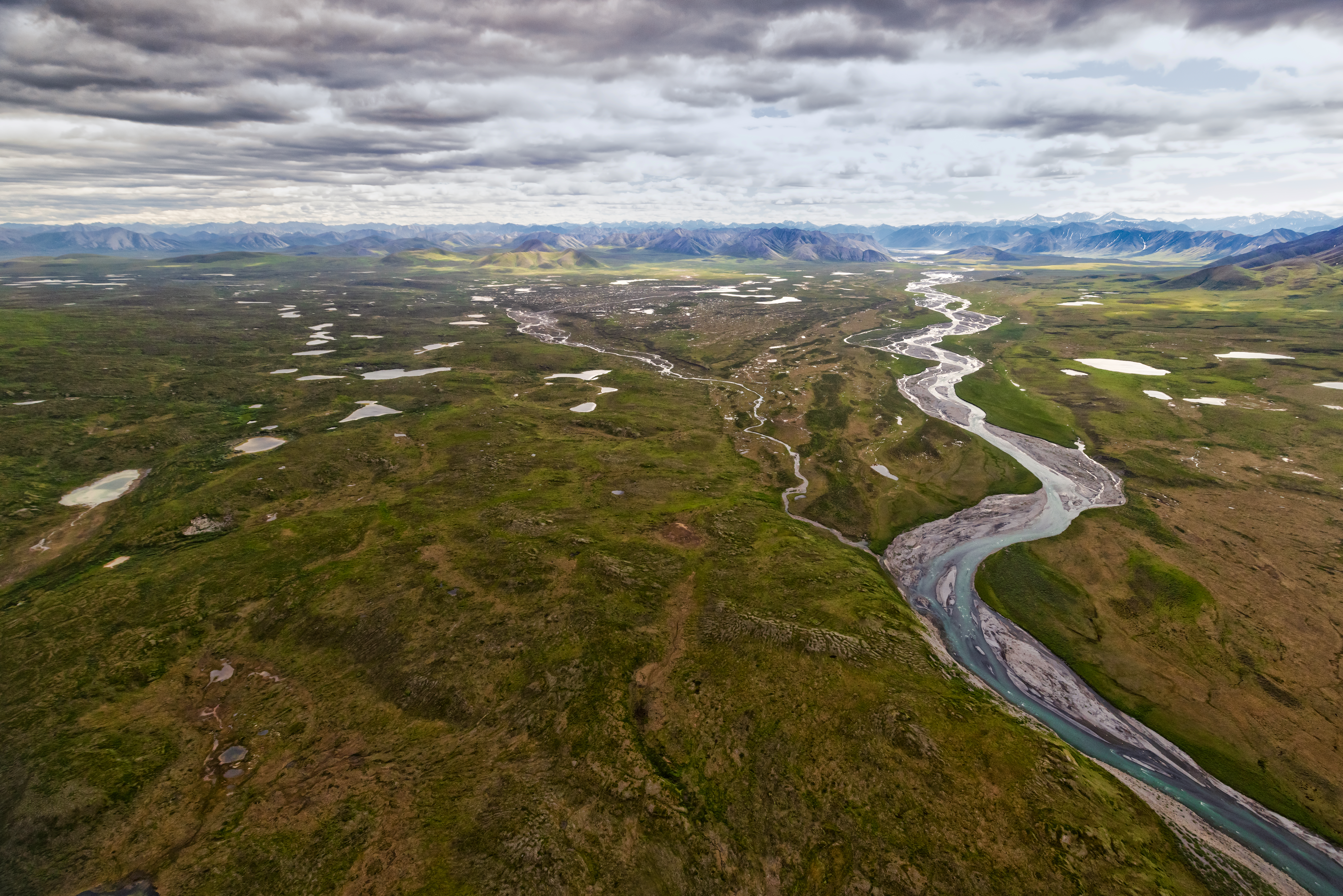
- Aerial view of the Ribdon River and Brooks Range

- Location of the mouth of the Sagavanirktok River in Alaska
- Native name: Shukukpaukat (Inupiaq)

Location
- Country: United States
- State: Alaska
- Borough: North Slope

Physical characteristics
- Source: Philip Smith Mountains
  - location: Brooks Range
  - coordinates: 68.6777778°N 147.2344444°W
- Mouth
  - location: Sagavanirktok River
  - coordinates: 68.8086111°N 148.7905556°W
- Length: 46 miles (74 km)

The Ribdon River is a river in the North Slope Borough of Alaska, United States. The river is largely located in the Arctic National Wildlife Refuge. It flows 46 miles (74 km) west from the Philip Smith Mountains into the Sagavanirktok River. Elusive Lake drains into the Ribdon.

The river is so named by U.S. Geological Survey (USGS) geologists in 1951, "because one of the geologists named Don had a rib injury." The Iñupiat name "Shukukpaukat" refers to the "high, steep, sharp mountains" that bound it.

The North American river otter is known to habitate the river.
