= Klokerblok River =

Coordinates: 64.634°N 163.394°W

Klokerblok River is a waterway in the U.S. state of Alaska, near Nome. This river rises a few miles from the coast, north of Cape Topkok. It flows in an easterly direction, and joins Fish River in its delta mouth. Front the upper end of Golofnin Sound, a broad depression extends inland, which includes the lower parts of the valleys of Fish, Klokerblok, and Niukluk Rivers. Except for a 50-foot (15 m) gravel terrace on the western side of Golofnin, there are few, if any, terraces or benches in this area.
