= Okpilak River =

River in Alaska, USA

Coordinates: 70°04′40″N 144°03′09″W

The Okpilak River (Iñupiaq: Uqpiiḷaq) is a 70-mile river located in Alaska. Its headwaters are in the Brooks Range, and it is named after an Iñupiaq term meaning "no willows". It is located in the North Slope Borough, Alaska. It drains into the Arctic Ocean, where it shares a delta with the Hulahula River. It passes alongside Arey Island. It contains deposits of uranium and molybdenum along its banks.
