= Yahtse River =

- Location of the mouth of the Yahtse River in Alaska

Location
- Country: United States
- State: Alaska
- Borough: City and Borough of Yakutat, Alaska

Physical characteristics
- Source
  - location: Malaspina Glacier
  - coordinates: 59°55′56″N 141°13′51″W
- Mouth: Pacific Ocean
  - location: 63 miles (101 km) west of Yakutat
  - coordinates: 59°51′48″N 141°23′36″W

The Yahtse River (Tlingit Yas'ei Héen) is a short glacier outlet stream extending from the Malaspina Glacier to the Pacific Ocean. The river formerly served as a primary outlet stream for the western portion of the Malaspina. Following the retreat of the Icy Bay glaciers in the 20th century the outlet of the Malaspina shifted to the Caetani River draining into Icy Bay, and the Yahtse was almost completely abandoned by the early 21st century.
