= Nil Desperandum Gulch =

Valley in Alaska, United States

Coordinates: 64.5536°N 165.2388°W

Nil Desperandum Gulch is a valley in Nome Census Area, Alaska, in the United States.

Nil Desperandum Gulch derives its name from the Latin phrase Nil desperandum, meaning "never despair".
