= Chandler River (Alaska) =

- Location of the mouth of the Chandler River in Alaska

Location
- Country: United States
- State: Alaska

Physical characteristics
- Mouth: Colville River
  - coordinates: 69°27′05″N 151°29′50″W
- Length: 125 mi (201 km)

The Chandler River is a 125-mile (201 km) stream in the U.S. state of Alaska, whose source is Chandler Lake in the Gates of the Arctic National Park. From Chandler Lake it flows, generally northward, into the Colville River, which it joins about 17 miles (27 km) northeast of Umiat.

== See also ==
- List of rivers of Alaska
