= Awuna River =

- Location of the mouth of the Awuna River in Alaska

Location
- Country: United States
- State: Alaska
- Borough: North Slope

Physical characteristics
- Source: Swamp north of Lookout Ridge
  - location: National Petroleum Reserve
  - coordinates: 69°20′01″N 158°45′22″W
  - elevation: 1,202 ft (366 m)
- Mouth: Colville River
  - location: West of Angoyakvik Pass, National Petroleum Reserve
  - coordinates: 69°02′55″N 155°27′48″W
  - elevation: 722 ft (220 m)
- Length: 200 mi (320 km)

The Awuna River also called Sakvailak by the Iñupiat is a 200-mile (320 km) tributary of the Colville River in the U.S. state of Alaska. Located entirely within the National Petroleum Reserve, it arises in a swamp north of Lookout Ridge in the North Slope Borough. It flows generally east to meet the larger river west of Angoyakvik Pass.

== Etymology ==
The river's name Awuna means "westward" or Uwanmun. The name given to the river now by the Iñupiat is Sakvailak.

== See also ==
- List of rivers of Alaska
