= Dinglishna Hill =

Hill in Alaska, United States

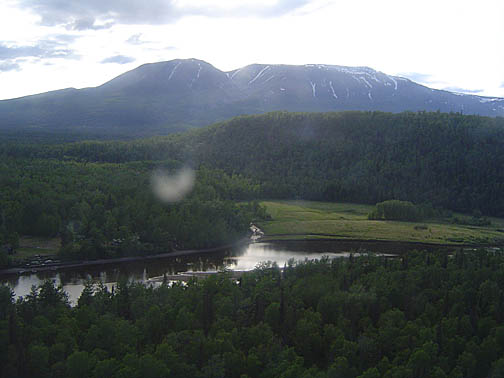

Highest point
- Elevation: 423 ft (129 m)
- Prominence: 397 ft (121 m)
- Coordinates: 61°26′39″N 150°36′24″W

Naming
- English translation: Little Mountain
- Language of name: Dena'ina

Geography
- Location within Alaska
- Location: Matanuska-Susitna Borough, Alaska, United States
- Parent range: Alaska Range
- Topo map: USGS Tyonek B-2

Geology
- Mountain type: Summit

Climbing
- Easiest route: Scramble

Dinglishna Hill /dɪŋˈlɪʃnə/ is a hill located East of Mount Susitna, in the Matanuska-Susitna Valley of South Central Alaska.

== History ==
Tanaina Indian name reported in 1958 by USGS.

=== Etymology ===
Dgelishla or Dghelishla in Dena'ina meaning "Little Mountain" is transliterated as "Dinglishna".

== Description ==
Dinglishna Hill is on W bank of Alexander Creek, 28 miles (45 km) north west of Anchorage, Cook Inlet Low.

== Location ==
Dinglishna Hill is a hill located East of Mount Susitna, West of Alexander Creek and the big Susitna River, South-West of Susitna, and North of Alexander in the Matanuska-Susitna Valley of South Central Alaska. It is also the name of the Dinglishna Hills subdivision of the Matanuska-Susitna Borough, Alaska.

== Terrain ==
The elevation of Dinglishna Hill is 479 feet (146 m) above mean sea level. The hill slopes down gradually until it reaches Alexander Creek near the confluence with the big Susitna River.

== Vegetation ==
The hill and its surroundings are vegetated with birch, spruce and low lying shrubs. The soil in the area is well-drained.

== Notes ==
A: Dinglishna Hill's prominence is approximately its 423 feet (129 m) summit elevation above mean sea level less Alexander Creek (at its base) 26 feet (7.9 m) elevation above mean sea level. Some of the land around Dinglishna Hill is several feet higher than the water level, but not much.
