= Susitna =

Susitna may refer to any of:

- Susitna Glacier
- The Susitna River in Alaska
- Mount Susitna, a mountain near the Susitna River in Alaska
- The Matanuska-Susitna Valley through which the Susitna River runs
- The Matanuska-Susitna Borough, a political subdivision in Alaska
- Susitna, Alaska, a census-designated place in the valley on the river
- MV Susitna, a ship built for the proposed Knik Arm ferry in Alaska
