= Denaʼina =

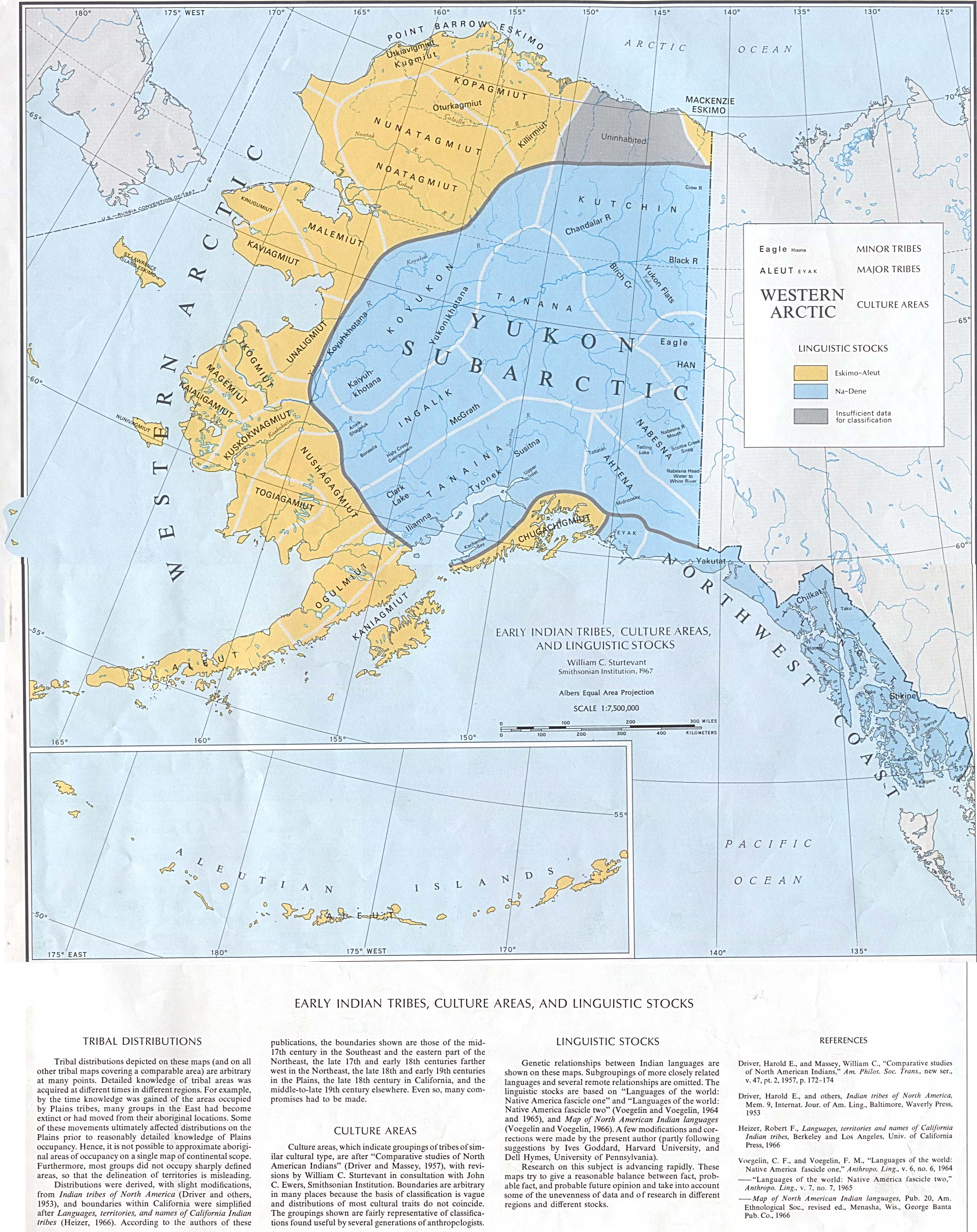
- Denaʼina (Tanaina) language area: Iliamna, Tyonek, Susitna

Total population
- 1,000

Regions with significant populations
- United States (Alaska)

Languages
- English, Denaʼina

Religion
- Orthodox Christianity, Animism

Related ethnic groups
- Ahtna, Deg Hitʼan, other northern Athabaskan peoples

- Person: Dena
- People: Denaʼina
- Language: Denaʼinaqʼ
- Country: Dena'ina Ełnena

The Denaʼina (/dɪˈnaɪnə/ dih-NY-nə; Inland Denaʼina: [dənʌʔɪnʌ]; Upper Inlet Denaʼina: [dənʌ͡ɪnʌ]; Russian: денаина), or formerly Tanaʼina or Kenai people (Russian: танаина, кенайцы), are an Alaska Native Athabaskan people. They are the original inhabitants of the south central Alaska region ranging from Seldovia in the south to Chickaloon in the northeast, Talkeetna in the north, Lime Village in the northwest and Pedro Bay in the southwest. The Denaʼina homeland (Denaʼina Ełnena) is more than 41,000 mi^{2} (110,000 km^{2}) in area. They arrived in the south-central Alaska sometime between 1,000 and 1,500 years ago. They were the only Alaskan Athabaskan group to live on the coast. The Denaʼina have a hunter-gatherer culture and a matrilineal system. The Iditarod Trail's antecedents were the native trails of the Denaʼina and Deg Hitʼan Athabaskan Native Alaskans and the Inupiaq Inuit.

Their neighbors are other Athabaskan peoples and Yupik peoples: Deg Hitʼan (northwest), Upper Kuskokwim (central north), Koyukon (northeast), Lower Tanana (a little part of northeast), Ahtna (east), Pacific Yupik (Ułchena/Ultsehaga, 'slaves'; Chugach Sugpiaq, south-southeast from Kenai Peninsula to Prince William Sound, and Koniag Alutiiq, south on Kodiak Archipelago and the Alaska Peninsula), and Central Yupik (Dudna, 'down-river people', west and southwest).

== Name ==
The name "Dena’ina" comes from two parts: dena meaning "person" and ina, the human plural marker in Dena’ina language means "the people", and is related to the autonym for the Southern Athabaskan Navajo people "Diné." The Denaʼina name for Cook Inlet is Tikahtnu meaning "Big Water River", "Ocean River" or Nuti meaning "Saltwater."

== Culture ==
The Denaʼina are the only Northern Athabascan group to live near saltwater which allowed them to have the most sedentary lifestyle of all Northern Athabascans. The Denaʼina were organized in regional bands or Ht’ana ("people of [a place or area]"), which were composed of local bands. The regional bands had several villages or qayeh, each containing multi-family dwellings called Nichił. Each Nichił was led by a qeshqa ("rich man" or "leader") who Russian and American traders and religious referred to as "Chiefs." Men and women in villages belong to their mother's clan. The clans were grouped into two sides or "moieties." Villagers could only marry outside of their own clan and moiety, maintaining diversity in the gene pool and strength in the village lineage. Archaeological work suggests that the Dena'ina have occupied the Upper and Outer Cook Inlet areas for the last 1,000 years, migrating from the Mulchatna and Stony River areas, where they had lived for thousands of years prior.

== Language and bands ==
Their traditional language, Denaʼina (Dena’ina Qenaga), currently has about 70-75 fluent speakers out of a total population of about 1,400. Denaʼina is one of eleven Alaska Athabascan languages. There are four primary dialects of Denaʼina (grouped with regional bands, local groups and today's tribal names):

- Inland / Lake Clark Denaʼina: (Qizhjeh Vena (Lake Clark), Qeghnilen ("Canyon" Village on Stony River), K’qizaghtetnu / K'qizaghetnu Hdakaq' (Stony River Village), Htsit (Tishimna Lake Village), Nunvendaltin (Nondalton on/or Sixmile Lake), Dilah Vena (Telaquana Lake), Hek'dichen Hdakaq' (Lime Village), Tanilen/Tanalian Point (near Port Alsworth), Qizhjeh (Kijik at Lake Clark), Vałts'anaq' (Mulchatna River villages), Vandaztunhtnu (Upper Mulchatna River), Łiq'a Qilanhtnu (Tlikakila River)) - today: Lime Village, Village of Stony River, and Nondalton Village
  - Nondalton Dena'ina or Nundaltinht’ana/Nuvendaltin Quht’ana ("People at Sixmile Lake/Nundalton Village") - today: Nondalton Village
- Iliamna Denaʼina: (Verna Kolyaha (Pedro Bay), Tsayehtnu Hdakaq' (Pile Bay Village), Ch'ak'dalitnu/Nuch'ak'dalitnu (Old Iliamna), Nilavena (Lake Iliamna), Nughilen (aka Nughiltnu Kaq' / Nughil Kaq', today Newhalen), Chix Kaq' (Chekok), Vighutiztin Hkayitaghi'u (Lonesome Bay Village))
  - Iliamna Denaʼina or Nilavena/Nilan Vena Ht’ana ("People at islands lake, i.e. Lake Iliamna") - today: Village of Iliamna, Newhalen Village, and Pedro Bay Village Council
- Upper Inlet Denaʼina: (Idlughet/Eydlughet (Eklutna), Niteh (Old Knik, Matanuska), Nughay Bena (New) Knik), Qiduk'ggat (Montana Creek), Tsat'ukegh/Susitnu Qayeh (Susitna Station), Tubughnenq' ((Old)Tyonek), Ch'aghałnikt (Point Possession Village), Tuqen Kaq'Qayeh (Alexander Creek Village), Tsuk Qayeh (Lower Yentna River Village), Benteh/Bentalit (Fish Lake Village sites), Dashq'e (Kroto Creek Village), Ch'aniltnu Hdakaq' (Chunilna Creek Village), Tatik'niłtun Bena (Stephan Lake Village), Tudli Bena (Nancy Lake Village), K'enakatnu (Fish Creek Village), Łajat (Cottonwood Creek Village), Nik'udatl'ech'a (Dinkle Lake Village), Nuk'din'itnu (Chickaloon), Skintuk'ełaha (Swan Lake Village), Tak'at/Tak'at Qenuch'en ("[Across from] Dip Net Platform", Cairn Point Village), Nuch'ishtunt ("Place Protected from Wind", Point Woronzof Village), Nen Ghiłgedi ("Rotten Land", near Point Woronzof), K'dalkitnu (Talkeetna River, Talkeetna townsite), Dgheyaytnu (Stickleback Creek (Ship Creek), original Anchorage townsite), Dgheyey Kaq' ("Mouth of Stickleback Creek", Anchorage), Chanshtnu ("Grass Creek, i.e. Chester Creek", original Anchorage townsite), Qin Cheghitnu ("Crying Ridge Creek", i.e. Campbell Creek)
  - Tyonek (Tubughnenq’) / Cook Inlet (Tikahtnu) Denaʼina or Tebughna/Tubughna ("Beach People") - today: Native Village of Tyonek
  - Susitna (River) Dena'ina or Susitnu Ht’ana ("Sandy River, i.e. Susitna River People") (Ahtna term: Dustnay - "People out in front", partly Western Ahtna band)
    - Alexander Creek Village Denaʼina or Tuqen Kaq'Qayeh Ht’ana ("Clear water mouth village People") - today: Alexander Creek Native Village
    - Susitna Station Denaʼina or Susitnu Qayeh Ht’ana ("Sand River Village People") / Yusdishla Qayeh Ht’ana ("Little Point Village People") - today: Native Village of Tyonek
  - Rainy Pass Dena'ina or Shandala Nununk'dnilghuyna ("People who holler to make migrating birds fall down")
  - Yentna River Dena'ina or Yentnu Ht’ana ("Backbone River, i.e. Yentna River People")
    - Lower Yentna Old Village Denaʼina or Tsuk Qayeh Qayeh Ht’ana ("Old Village Village People")
  - Middle Susitna River Denaʼina or Dunʼena ("Near Upriver People")
    - Kroto Creek Denaʼina or Dashq'e Ht’ana ("On the shoal People" or "On the shallows People")
    - Montana Creek Village Denaʼina or Qiduk'ggat Ht’ana ("Frozen Overflow People")
  - Talkeetna Mountains Ahtna-Denaʼina or Dghelay Teht’ana/Dzelyi Ht’ana ("(Talkeetna) Mountains People", mixed Western Ahtna-Denaʼina band)
  - Knik (Arm area) (K’enakatnu) Dena'ina or K’enah Ht’ana ("Vision People?") - today: Knik Tribal Council
    - Eklutna (Idlughet) Village Dena'ina or Idlughet/Eydlughe Ht’ana/Idluytnu Qayeh Ht’ana ("at the plural objects People") - today: Native Village of Eklutna
    - Matanuska (Old Knik) Village Dena'ina or Niteh Ht’ana ("Among the islands People") - today: Knik Tribal Council
  - Turnagain Arm Dena'ina or Tutl'uht'ana ("Headwaters People") - today: Knik Tribal Council and Native Village of Eklutna
    - Point Possession Dena'ina or Tuzqunt Ht’ana/Tuyqunt Ht’ana ("Stillwater People, i.e. Point Possession People")
  - Western Ahtna-Dena'ina or Htsay Ht’ana (Dena'ina name) / Hwtsaay Hwt’aene (Ahtna name) ("Small Timber People")
    - Chickaloon Dena'ina or Nuk'din'itnu Ht’ana (Dena'ina name - "Bridge goes across-stream People") or Nay’dini’aa Na’ Hwt’aene (Ahtna name - "The river with the two logs across it People") - today: Chickaloon Village Traditional Council
    - Wasilla area Dena'ina or Benteh Ht’ana ("Among the Lakes People") - today: Knik Tribal Council
    - Fish Creek-Knik Village Dena'ina or K'enakatnu Ht’ana ("'?-stream People") - today: Knik Tribal Council
- Outer Inlet / Kenai (Kahtnu) Denaʼina (Kahtnuht’ana Qenaga): (Shk'ituk't/Ch'k'ituk't (Old Kenai Village Site), Kahtnu Qayah (Kenai), Sqilant (Kenai Lake Village), Qezdeghnen (Kustatan sites), Ts'eslahtnu (Old Seldovia), Angidahtnu (Seldovia), Unhghenesditnu (Kalifornsky Village), Tałin Ch'iłtant (Polly Creek), Nihnalchint (Ninilchik), Tsayehq'at (China Poot Bay Village), K'kaq' (Anchor Point Village), K'echan Dałkizt (Humpy Point Village), Ggasilat (Kasilof Village), Quqegh Nik'eteleht (Libby Creek (Seven Egg Creek) Village), Tiduqilts'ett (Titukilsk Village), Ken Dech'etl't (Salamatof), Ch'anilnat (Chinila Village), Chunuk'tnu (Russian River), Tikahtnu (Cook Inlet), Yaghenen ("Good Land, i.e. Kenai Peninsula"))
  - Kenai (River) Dena'ina or Kahtnuht’ana/Nkahtnuht’ana ("Kahtnu (Kenai River) People", lit. "River mouth river People") - today: Kenaitze Indian Tribe
  - Skilak Lake Dena'ina or Q’es Dudilent Ht’ana ("Skilak Lake People", lit. "Flows Into Outlet Place (at Skilak Lake) People") - today: Kenaitze Indian Tribe
  - Kenai Lake Dena'ina or Sqilan Bena Ht’ana ("Kenai Lake People", lit. "Ridge Place Lake People") / Sqilant Ht’ana ("Ridge Place Village People")
  - Kenai Mountains Dena'ina or Tsaht’ana ("(Kenai) Mountains People", mixed Denaʼina-Western Ahtna band) - today: Seldovia Village Tribe
  - Kenai Peninsula / Swanson River Dena'ina or Yaghanen Ht’ana/Yaht’ana/Yaghedna ("Good Land, i.e. Kenai Peninsula People") - today: Seldovia Village Tribe and Ninilchik Traditional Council
    - Nikiski area Dena'ina or Qeghnen Ht’ana ("Adjacent Land People") - today: Village of Salamatof
  - Kustatan and West-Lower Cook Denaʼina or Qezdeghtna/Qeydaghetna (anglicised "Kustatan" - "Peninsula People, lit. Point of Land People") - today: Ninilchik Traditional Council
  - Kasilof River Denaʼina or Ggasilahtnu Denaʼina - today: Ninilchik Traditional Council

== Dena’ina Alaska Native Regional Corporations/Alaska Native village corporations ==
Cook Inlet Tribal Council (CIRI) ("Upper Inlet" and "Outer Inlet / Kenai Denaʼina"-speaking bands)

- Chickaloon Village Traditional Council (Ahtna name: Nay'dini'aa Na' - "the river with the two logs across it", Dena’ina name: Nuk'din'itnu - "bridge goes across-stream") (Western Ahtna and Dena’ina peoples)
- Native Village of Eklutna (Idlughet Qayeht’ana - "at the plural objects People" and Tutl'uht'ana - "Headwaters People")
- Kenaitze Indian Tribe (Kahtnuht’ana - "Kahtnu (Kenai River) People", and Q’es Dudilent Ht’ana - "Skilak Lake People")
- Knik Tribal Council (K′enah Ht’ana - "Vision People?", other groups are Niteh Ht’ana - "Among the islands People", Benteh Ht’ana - "Among the Lakes People", Tutl'uht'ana - "Headwaters People", and K'enakatnu Ht’ana - "'?-stream People") (Dena’ina and Western Ahtna peoples)
- Ninilchik Traditional Council (Niqnalchint Qayeh Kenu - "Ninilchik Village Tribe" or Niqnalchint - "A place were a lodge is built", historic Yaghanen Ht’ana/Yaht’ana/Yaghedna - "Good Land People, i.e. Kenai Peninsula People", Qezdeghtna/Qeydaghetna - "Peninsula People" and Ggasilahtnu Ht’ana - "Kasilof River People") (Dena’ina, Chugach Sugpiaq (Alutiiq), Western Ahtna, and Central Alaskan Yup'ik peoples)
- Salamatof Tribal Council (Ken Dech’etl’t - "scrub timber flat lake, i.e.Salamatof Lake")
- Seldovia Village Tribe (historic Dena’ina bands: Yaghanen Ht’ana/Yaht’ana/Yaghedna - "Good Land People, i.e. Kenai Peninsula People", Tsaht’ana - "Mountain People") (Unangax (Aleut), Yupik, Chugach Sugpiaq (Alutiiq), Dena’ina, and Western Ahtna peoples)
- Native Village of Tyonek (Tebughna/Tubughna - "Beach People", and Susitnu Qayeh Ht’ana - "Sand River Village People")

Alexander Creek, Incorporated ("Upper Inlet Denaʼina"-speaking bands)

- Alexander Creek Native Village (Tuqen Kaq'Qayeh Ht’ana - "Clear water mouth village People")

Calista Corporation ("Inland / Lake Clark Denaʼina"-speaking bands)

- Lime Village (Hek'dichen Hdakaq - "lack of abundance mouth", therefore formerly known as Hungry Village) (Yup’ik, Cup’ik, Denaʼina and Alaska Athabascan)

Bristol Bay Native Association ("Inland / Lake Clark Denaʼina" and "Iliamna Denaʼina"-speaking bands)

- Iliamna Village Council (Nilavena/Nilan Vena Ht’ana - "People at islands lake, i.e. Lake Iliamna") (General Central Yup'ik, Alutiiq, and Dena’ina peoples)
- Newhalen Tribal Council (Dena’Ina name: Nughilen - "Newhalen River Village" or Nughiltnu - "flows-down river, i.e. Newhalen River", Central Alaskan Yup'ik name: Nuuriileng, historic bands: Nilavena/Nilan Vena Ht’ana - "People at islands lake, i.e. Lake Iliamna"), as Newhalen Village also part of the Alaska Peninsula Corporation(Yup’ik, Alutiiq, and Dena’ina peoples)
- Nondalton Tribal Council or Nondalton Village (Nundaltinht’an - "Sixmile Lake/Nundalton Village" or Nuvendaltin Quht’ana - "People at Sixmile Lake/Nundalton Village")

Pedro Bay Corporation ("Iliamna Denaʼina"-speaking bands)

- Pedro Bay Village Council (Verna Kolyaha, historic Nilavena/Nilan Vena Ht’ana - "People at islands lake, i.e. Lake Iliamna") - also part of the Bristol Bay Native Association

Kuskokwim Corporation ("Inland / Lake Clark Denaʼina"-speaking bands)

- Village of Stony River (Dena’ina name: K'qizaghetnu Hdakaq' - "Village at the distant river", Deg Xitʼan name: Gidighuyghatno’ Xidochagg Qay’ ) (Dena’ina, Deg Xitʼan, Upper Kuskokwim, and Yupik peoples)
- Village of Aniak (Yupik name: “the place where it comes out”, which refers to the mouth of the Aniak River) (Yupik and Dena’ina peoples)
- Native Village of Chuathbaluk (Yupik name Curapalek meaning “the hills where the big blueberries grow”) (Yupik and Dena’ina peoples)
- Native Village of Georgetown (Yupik and Dena’ina peoples)
- Village of Red Devil (Yupik and Dena’ina peoples)

== Namesakes ==
The city of Anchorage chose to honor the Denaʼina by naming the city's new convention center the Denaʼina Civic and Convention Center.

== Notable Denaʼina people ==
- Alice E. Brown, activist, 1912–1973
- Adelheid Herrmann, Alaskan state legislator (1983–1989), researcher
- Peter Kalifornsky, author and ethnographer, 1911–1993

== See also ==
- Alaska Natives
- Denaʼina Civic and Convention Center
