= Chulitna River =

The Chulitna River is the name of two rivers in Alaska:

- Chulitna River (Susitna River tributary), a 70 mile long tributary of the Susitna River.
- Chulitna River (Lake Clark), a 90 mile long tributary of Lake Clark.

== See also ==
- List of Alaska rivers
