= Vehicle registration plates of Native American tribes in the United States =

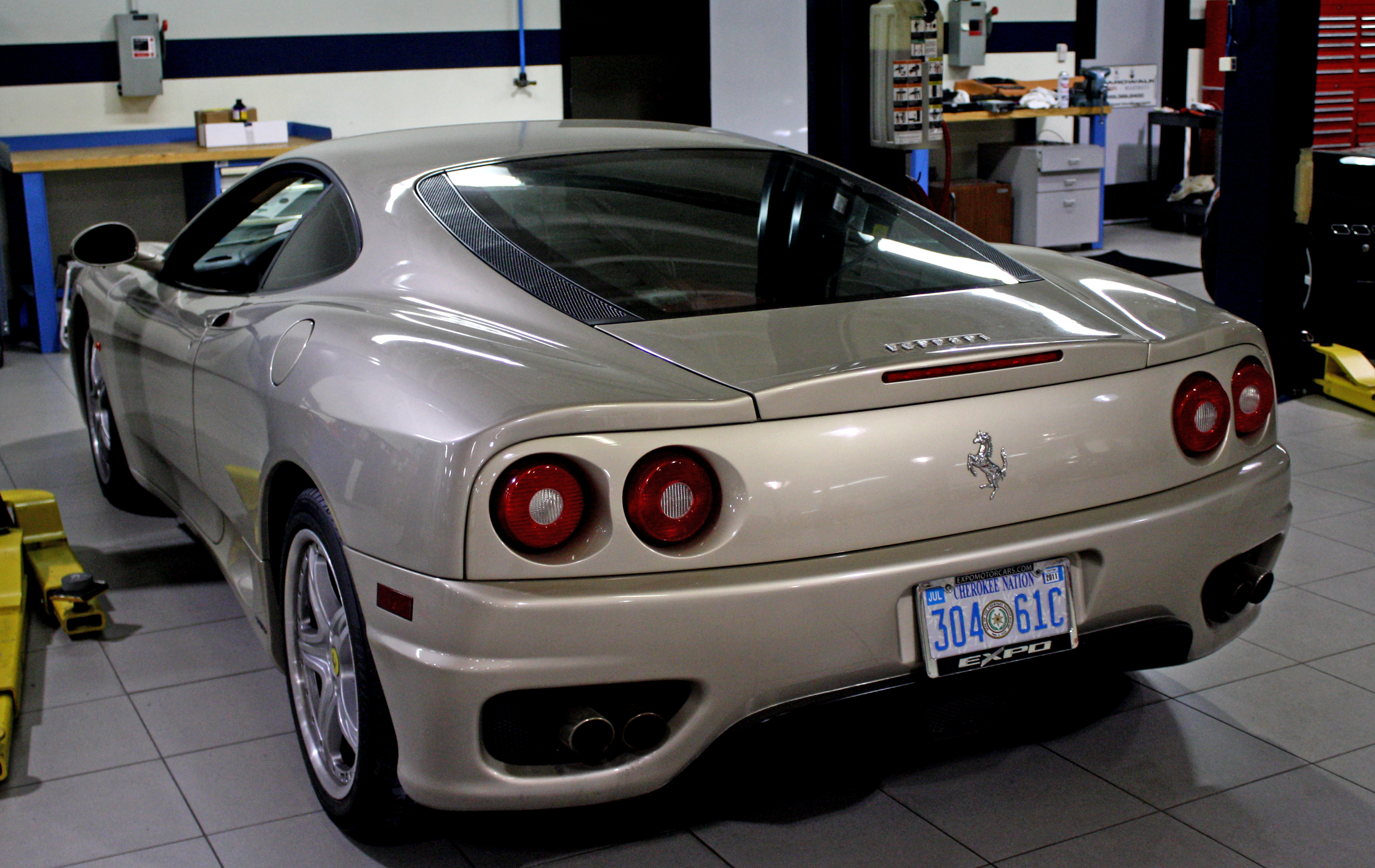
Ferrari 360 Modena bearing a plate from the Cherokee Nation

Several Native American tribes in the United States register motor vehicles and issue license plates to those vehicles.

The legal status of these plates varies by tribe, with some being recognized by the federal government and others not. Some nations issue plates for both tribal and personal vehicles, while others issue plates only for official tribal vehicles.

Some nations' plates indicate the U.S. state with which they are most closely associated, while others do not. This variation may even exist among the nations associated with one particular state. In the state of Oklahoma, the Native American plates are a common sight, always showing the name OKLAHOMA in some part of the plate.

Federally recognized tribes may also lease vehicles through the U.S. General Services Administration under certain circumstances. Such vehicles carry U.S. government license plates.

== Alaska ==
- Chickaloon: legal status unknown
- Gold Creek-Susitna: legal status unknown

== Maine ==
- Wabanaki Confederacy (Maine license plates inscribed "Wabanaki," restricted to members of the Confederacy.)
  Wabanaki License Plate

== Michigan ==
- Keweenaw Bay Indian Community
- Bay Mills Indian Community
- Saginaw Chippewa Tribal Nation

== Minnesota ==
- Red Lake Indian Reservation
- White Earth Indian Reservation
- Fond du Lac Band of Lake Superior Chippewa
- Grand Portage Band of Lake Superior Chippewa
- Leech Lake Band of Ojibwe

== North Dakota ==
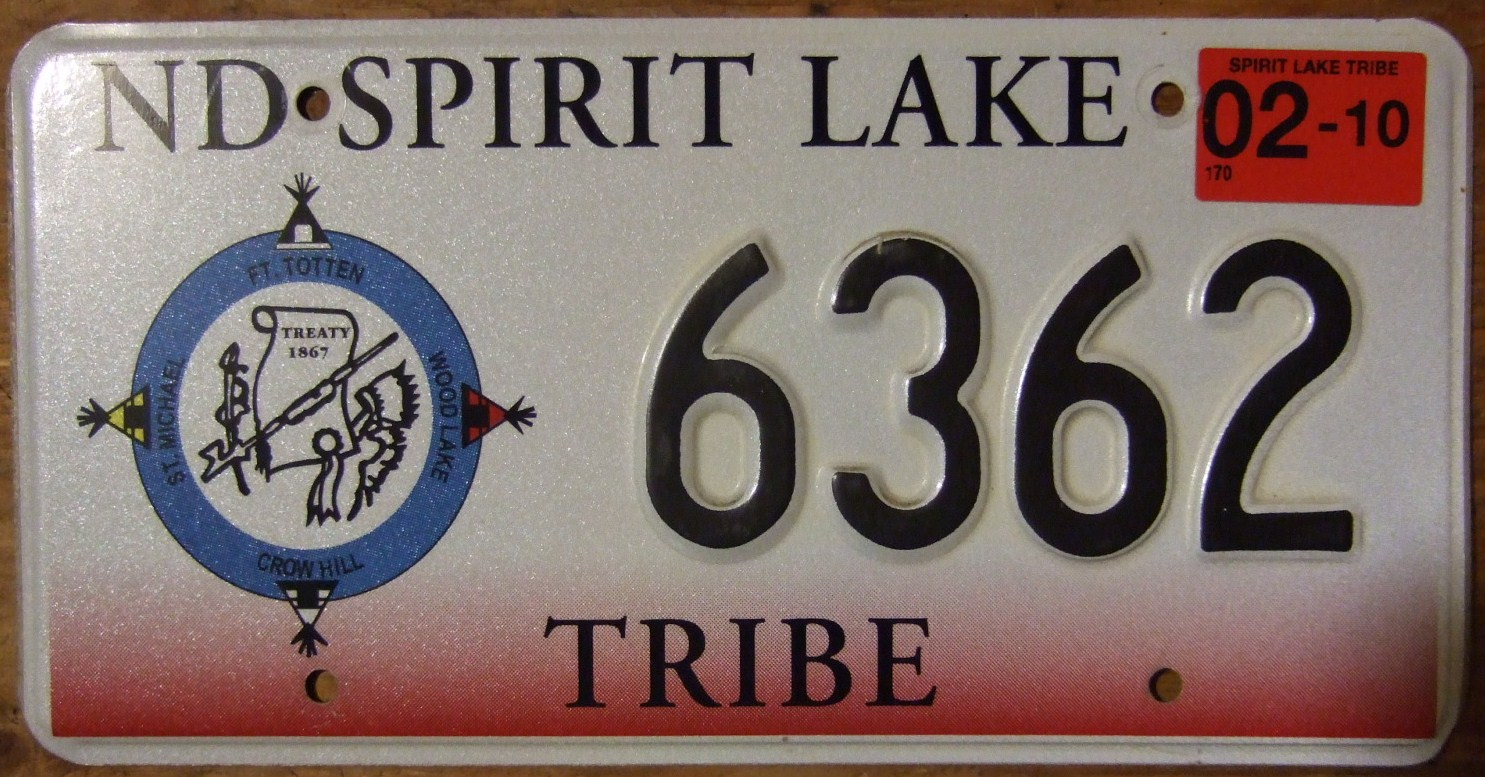
Spirit Lake Tribe license plate

- Spirit Lake Tribe
- Three Affiliated Tribes
- Turtle Mountain Band of Chippewa

== Oklahoma ==
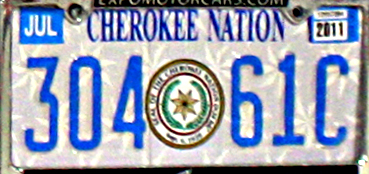
Cherokee Nation of Oklahoma license plate

- Absentee-Shawnee Tribe of Indians of Oklahoma
- Apache Tribe of Oklahoma
- Caddo Nation of Oklahoma
- Cherokee Nation
- Cheyenne and Arapaho Tribes
- Chickasaw Nation
- Choctaw Nation of Oklahoma
- Citizen Potawatomi Nation
- Comanche Nation
- Delaware Nation
- Eastern Shawnee Tribe of Oklahoma
- Iowa Tribe of Oklahoma
- Kaw Nation
- Kickapoo Tribe of Oklahoma
- Kiowa Indian Tribe of Oklahoma
- Miami Tribe of Oklahoma
- Modoc Tribe of Oklahoma
- Muscogee Creek Nation
- Osage Nation
- Ottawa Tribe of Oklahoma
- Otoe-Missouria Tribe of Indians
- Pawnee Nation of Oklahoma
- Peoria Tribe of Indians of Oklahoma
- Ponca Tribe of Indians of Oklahoma
- Quapaw Tribe of Indians
- Sac and Fox Nation
- Seminole Nation of Oklahoma
- Seneca-Cayuga Tribe of Oklahoma
- Shawnee Tribe
- United Keetoowah Band of Cherokee Indians in Oklahoma
- Wichita and Affiliated Tribes (Wichita, Keechi, Waco & Tawakonie)
- Wyandotte Nation

== South Dakota ==
All tribal plates in South Dakota are issued by the state. There are nine tribes recognized. All nine have non-graphic, tax exempt plates beginning with a tribe-specific prefix, for use on official vehicles. Seven of the nine tribes also have graphic plates available for private vehicles. The graphic plates are available to all South Dakota residents; no tribal affiliation is required.

- Cheyenne River Lakota: official vehicles only; South Dakota Exempt plates with "CRT" prefix.
- Crow Creek Dakota
- Lower Brule Lakota
- Flandreau Santee Dakota
- Oglala Lakota: official vehicles only; South Dakota Exempt plates with "OST" prefix.
- Rosebud Lakota
- Sisseton Wahpeton Dakota
- Standing Rock Dakota & Lakota
- Yankton Dakota

== Washington ==
Official, tribally owned vehicles bearing plates issued by tribes are allowed to use public roads under Washington state law. The Yakama tribe began issuing plates to all members in 2011.

- Puyallup
- Colville
- Lummi
- Muckleshoot
- Quinault Indian Nation
- Spokane Tribe
- Tulalip Tribes
- Yakama Nation

== Wisconsin ==
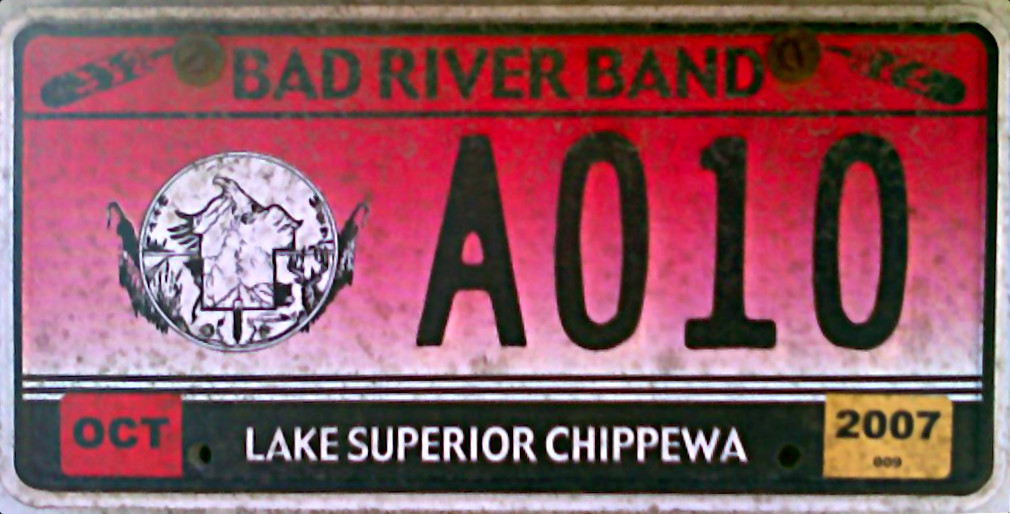
Bad River Tribal license plate

Wisconsin Department of Transportation has reciprocal recognition of vehicle registration with the indicated Tribal organizations. It allows for unrestricted use and operations of vehicles registered with either the State of Wisconsin or the Tribal jurisdictions as per Wisconsin Statutes Section 341.409.

- Bad River Band of the Lake Superior Tribe of Chippewa Indians
- Lac Courte Oreilles Band of Lake Superior Chippewa Indians
- Lac du Flambeau Band of Lake Superior Chippewa
- Menominee Indian Tribe of Wisconsin
- Oneida Indian Tribe of Wisconsin, with variations for different clans
- Red Cliff Band of Lake Superior Chippewa
