= Tokosha Mountains =

Mountain in Alaska, United States

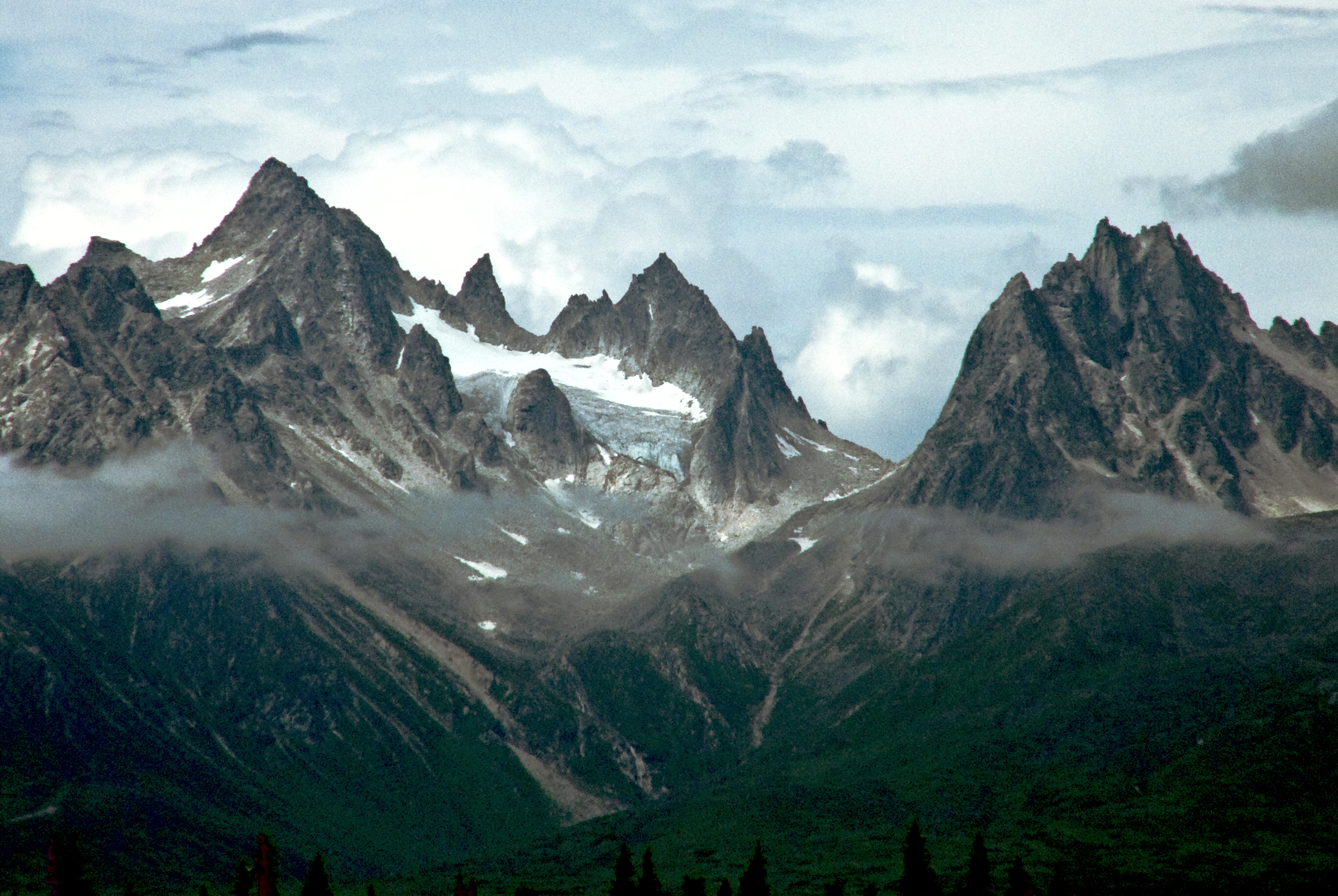
- Tokosha Mountains, east aspect

Highest point
- Elevation: 6,148 ft (1,874 m)
- Prominence: 2,898 ft (883 m)
- Isolation: 10.12 mi (16.29 km)
- Coordinates: 62°43′0″N 150°37′54″W

Geography
- Location within Alaska
- Interactive map of Tokosha Mountains
- Country: United States
- State: Alaska
- Borough: Matanuska-Susitna
- Protected area: Denali National Park
- Parent range: Alaska Range
- Topo map: USGS Talkeetna C-2

Geology
- Rock type: Granite

Climbing
- First ascent: 1975 David Johnston, Brian Okonek

Tokosha Mountains is a 6,148 ft (1,870 m) multi-peak massif located in the Alaska Range, in Denali National Park and Preserve, in Alaska, United States. It is situated between the toes of Ruth Glacier and Tokositna Glacier, 27 mi (43 km) south-southeast of Denali and 26 mi (42 km) northwest of Talkeetna. Despite its relatively low elevation, it is notable for its Teton-esque granite spires which can be seen from the George Parks Highway. Precipitation runoff from the mountain drains into the Tokositna River → Chulitna River → Susitna River. Topographic relief is significant as the highest summit, Grand Tokosha, rises 3,850 feet (1,173 meters) above the Ruth Glacier in one mile (1.6 km).

== History ==
In the Denaʼina language, tokosha means "treeless" or "treeless area". The mountain was named in 1906 by explorer Belmore Browne of the Cook Expedition which attempted to climb Denali. This landform's toponym was officially adopted in 1962 by the U.S. Board on Geographic Names. The first ascent of Grand Tokosha was made on March 3, 1975, by David Johnston and Brian Okonek.

== Climate ==
Based on the Köppen climate classification, Tokosha Mountains are located in a subarctic climate zone with long, cold, snowy winters, and short cool summers. Winter temperatures can drop below 0 °F with wind chill factors below −10 °F. The months of May through June offer the most favorable weather for climbing or viewing.

== Gallery ==
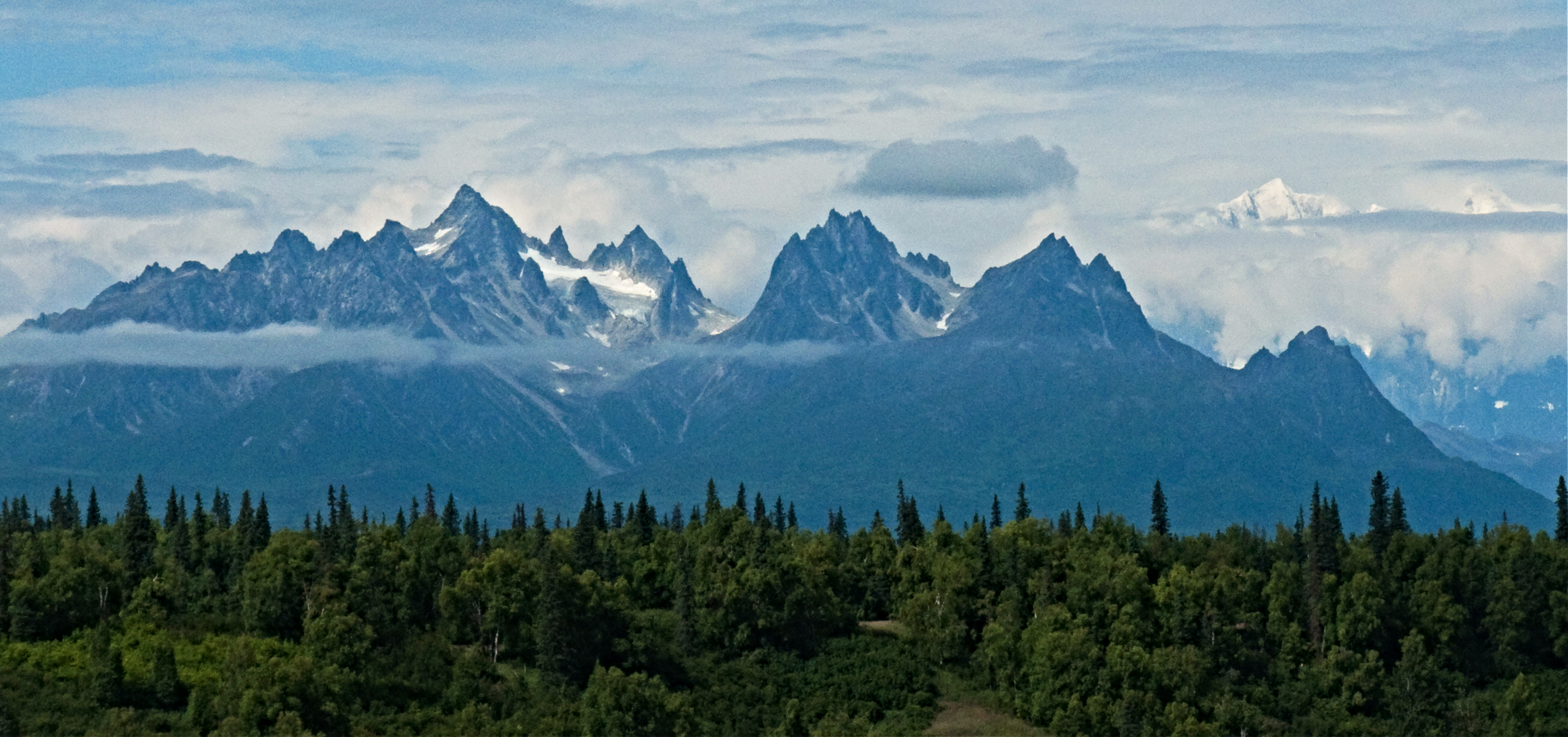
Tokosha Mountains seen from the George Parks Highway

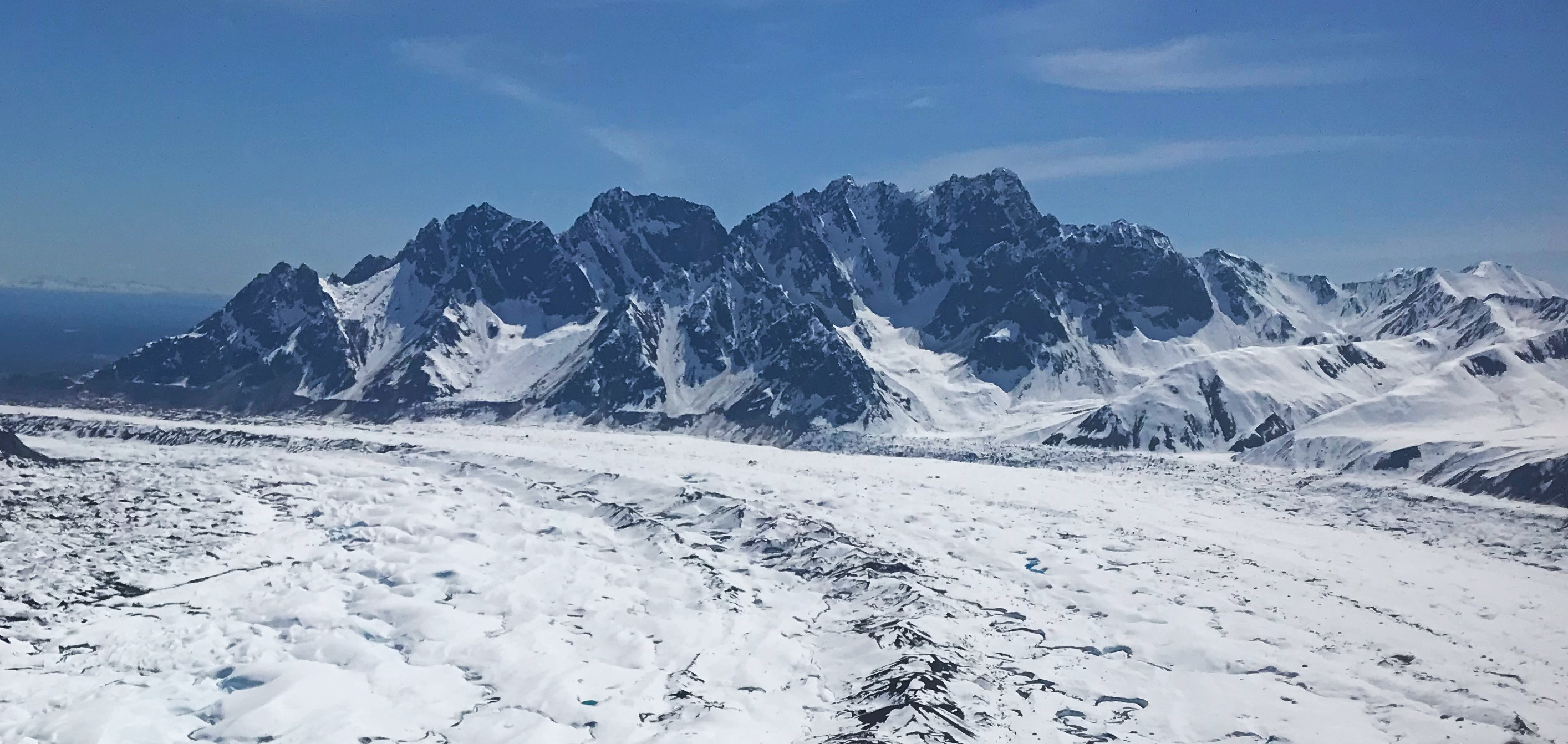
The north side of Tokosha Mountains seen flying over Ruth Glacier

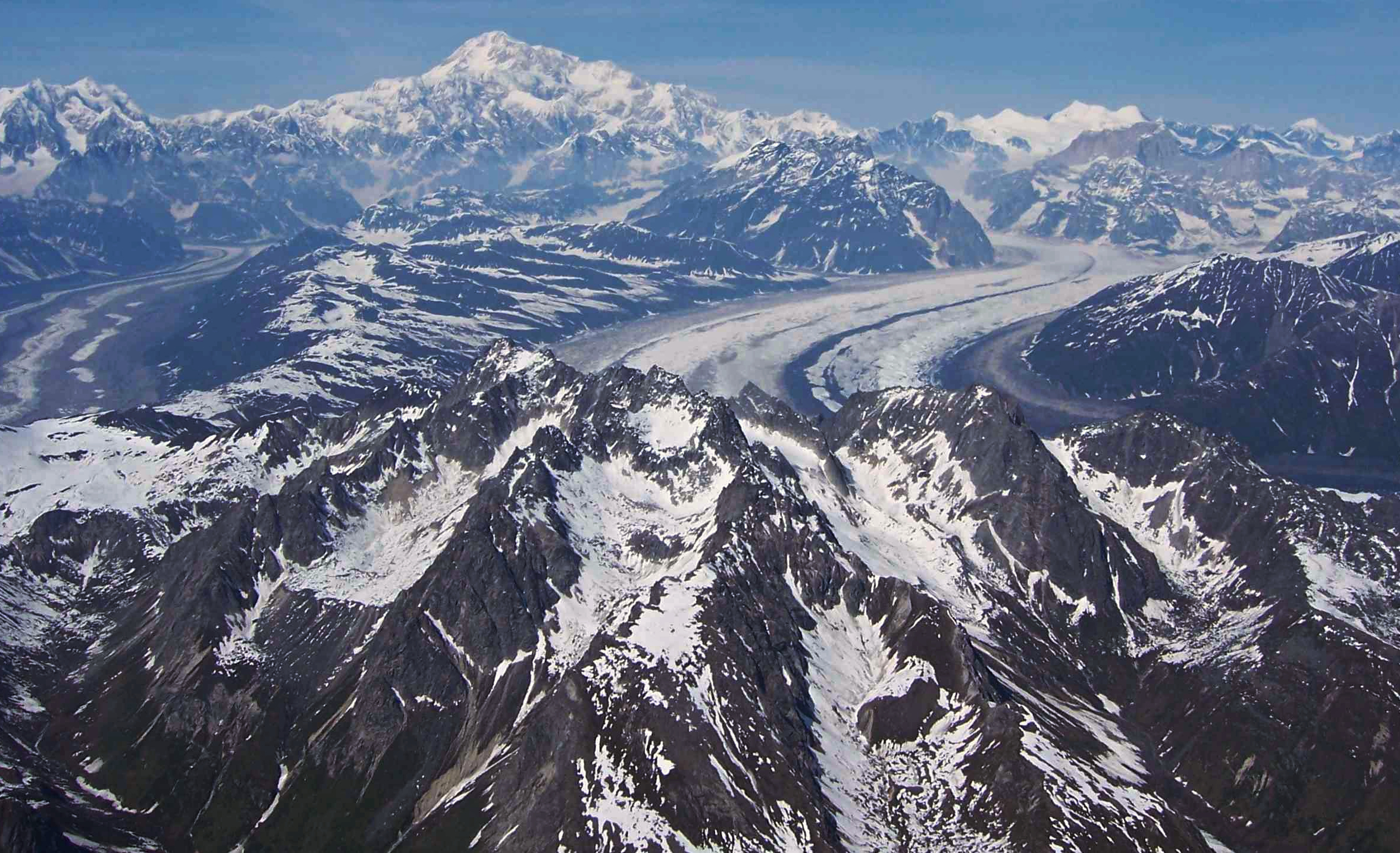
Aerial view of Tokosha Mountains in lower half of frame, with Ruth Glacier and Denali in the distance

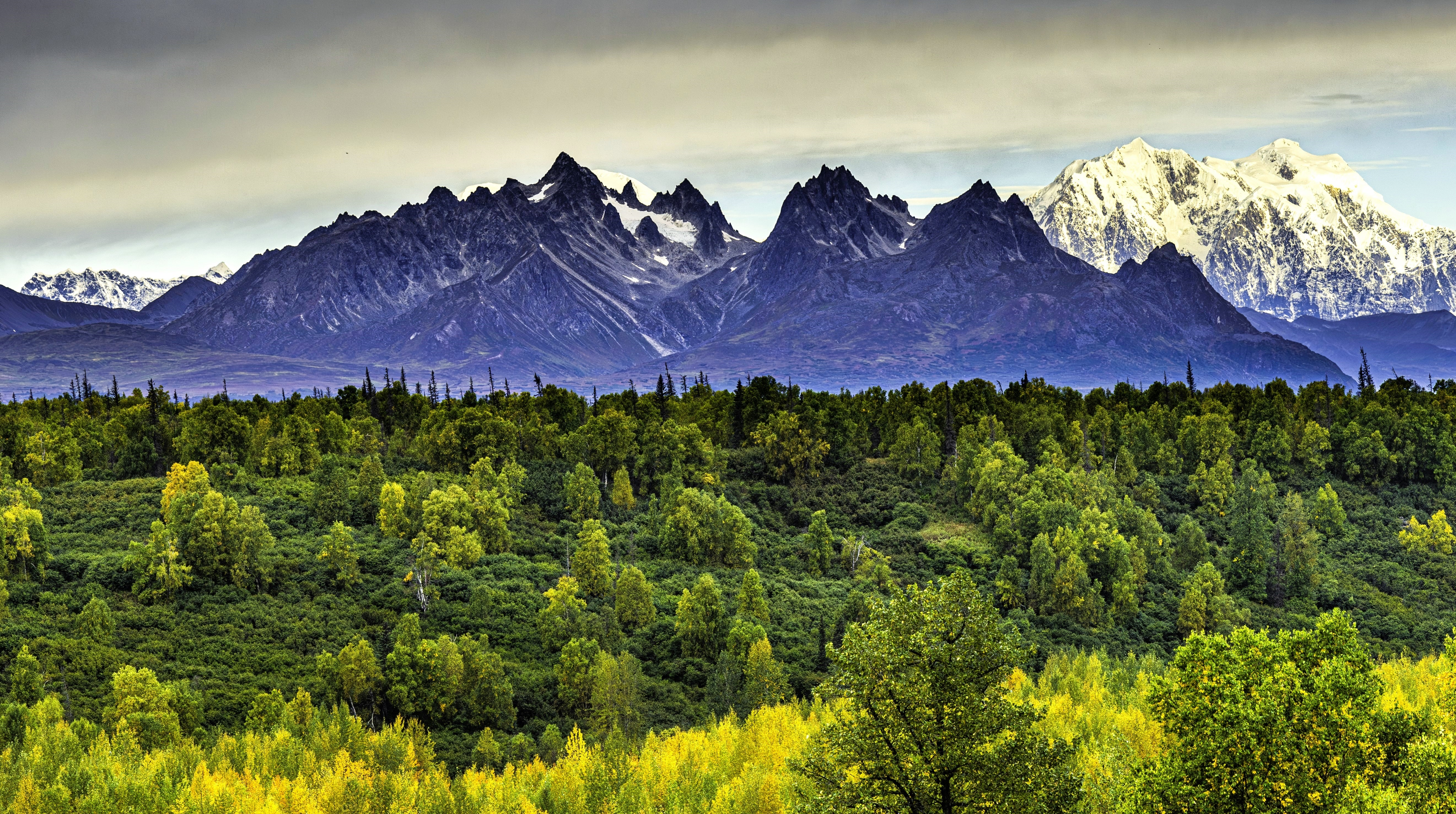
Tokosha Mountains viewed from the south viewpoint along Highway 3.
Mts. Hunter/Stevens in upper right.

== See also ==
- List of mountain peaks of Alaska
- Geology of Alaska
