= Yentna River =

River in Alaska, United States

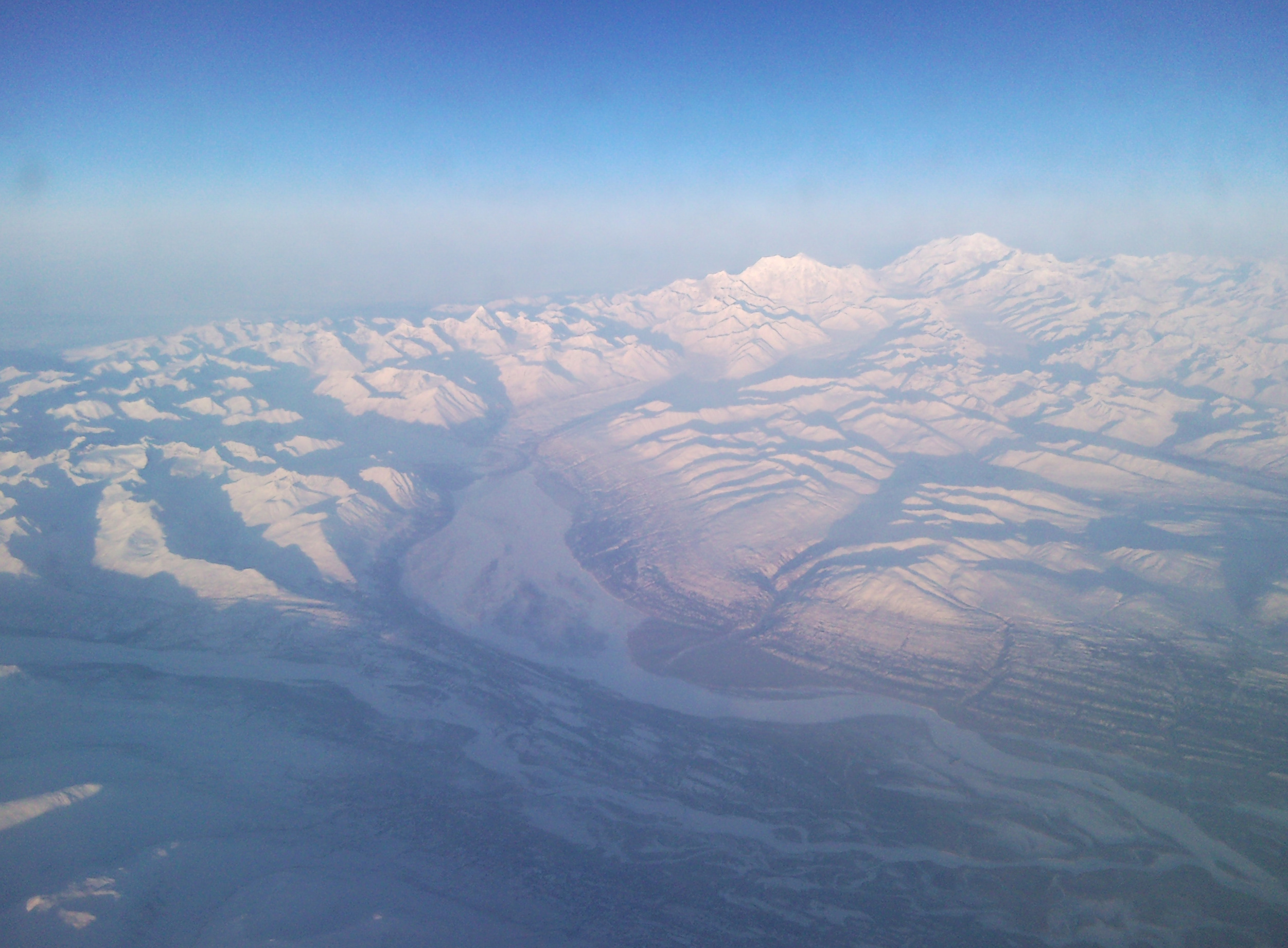
- Yentna River in Southcentral Alaska

- Location of the mouth of the Yentna River in Alaska
- Native name: Yentnu (Denaʼina)

Location
- Country: United States of America

Physical characteristics
- Source
  - location: East Fork Yentna River and West Fork Yentna River; Matanuska-Susitna Borough, Alaska
  - coordinates: 62°16′50″N 151°46′26″W
  - elevation: 200 ft (61 m)
- Mouth
  - location: Susitna River; Matanuska-Susitna Borough, Alaska
  - coordinates: 61°33′38″N 150°29′4″W
  - elevation: 26 ft (7.9 m)
- Length: 75 mi (121 km)

The Yentna River (Dena'ina: Yentnu) is a river in South Central Alaska, formed by its East Fork and West Fork at 62°16′50″N 151°46′26″W, flows South-East to Susitna River, 30 miles (48 km) North-West of Anchorage, Alaska, at Cook Inlet Low.

== History ==
Tanaina Indian name reported by Spurr (1900, p. 46), United States Geological Survey. "Sometimes called Johnson River after the first white man to ascend it."

The Iditarod Trail Sled Dog Race route travels along the Yentna River for about 40 miles, from the mouth at the Susitna River up to a tributary, the Skwentna River. The first checkpoint of the race at Yentna Station is located along the left bank of the river.

== Watershed ==
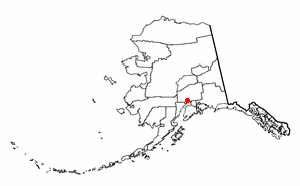
Location of Susitna, Alaska

It begins in the Mount Dall and Yentna glacier systems and flows southeast to the Susitna River 2 miles (3.2 km) north of Susitna. The river system (including upstream tributaries) is about 100 miles (160 km) long.

=== Tributaries ===
From mouth to source:

- Kahiltna River 61°51′11″N 150°46′46″W, Elevation: 75 feet (23 m)
- Bottle Creek (Yentna River) 61°57′49″N 151°4′44″W, Elevation: 125 feet (38 m)
- Skwentna River 61°59′8″N 151°8′23″W, Elevation: 125 feet (38 m)
- East Fork Yentna River 62°16′49″N 151°46′26″W, Elevation: 200 feet (61 m)
- West Fork Yentna River 62°16′49″N 151°46′26″W, Elevation: 200 feet (61 m)

Lake Creek just about 8 miles down river from Bottle Creek. Major fishing area: kings, reds, silvers. Winter sports, hunting. Moose Creek, Indian Creek, Fish lakes Creek, Hewitt Creek, Malone's Slough, Donkey Creek, Johnson Creek, Clearwater Creek, Rich Creek, Flag Creek, Delta Creek, Fourth of July Creek, & Kichatna River round out the rest of the main Yentna River Tributaries.

== See also ==
List of rivers of Alaska
