= Susitna Glacier =

Glacier in Alaska, United States

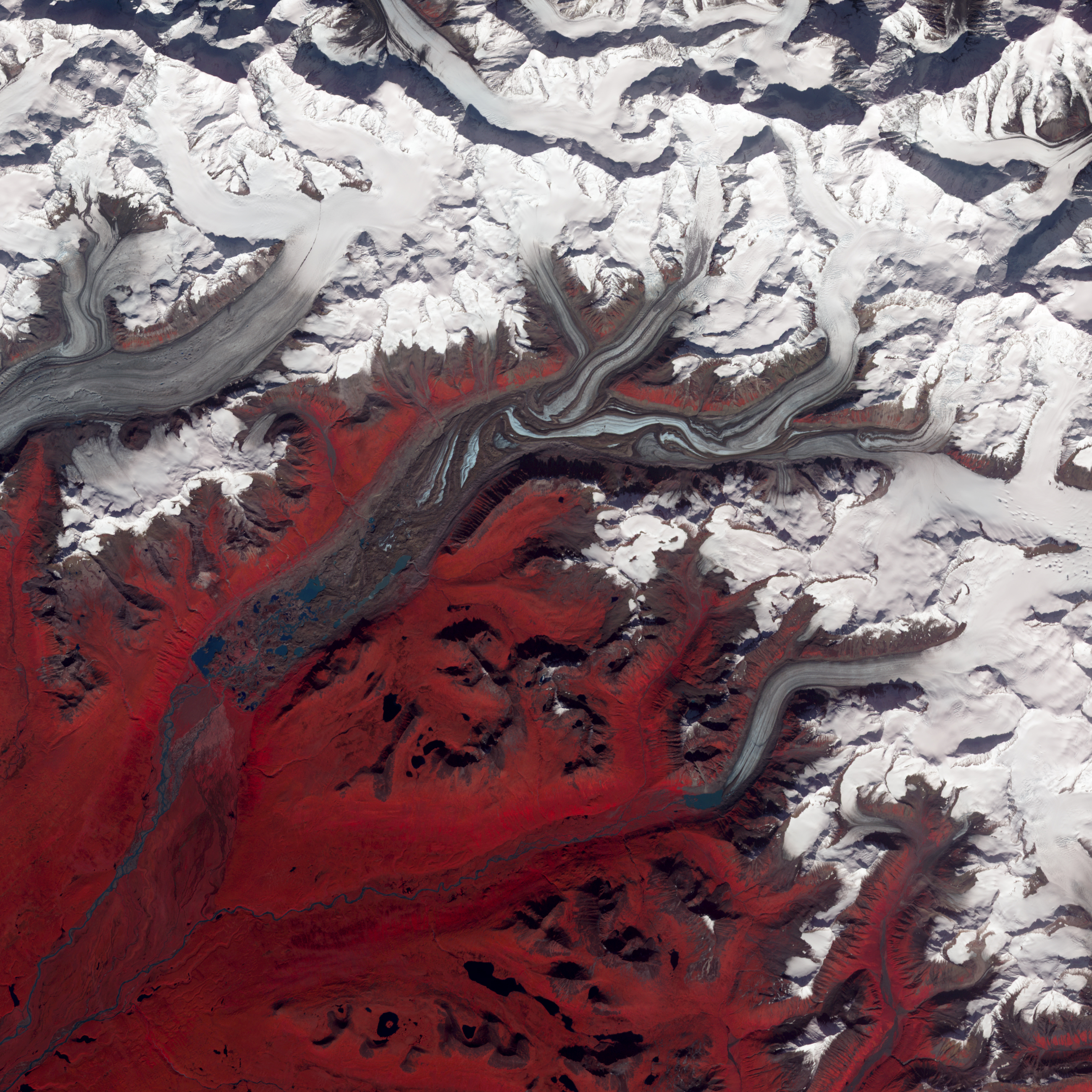
- False-colour image of Susitna Glacier.

- Location within Alaska
- Interactive map of Susitna Glacier
- Type: Valley glacier
- Location: Alaska Range, Alaska
- Coordinates: 63°35′N 146°45′W
- Terminus: Susitna River

Susitna Glacier is an alpine or valley glacier in the Alaska Range. Susitna Glacier flows over a seismically active area. The 7.9-magnitude 2002 Denali earthquake struck the region in November 2002. The earthquake initiated with thrust movement on the previously unrecognized Susitna Glacier fault.

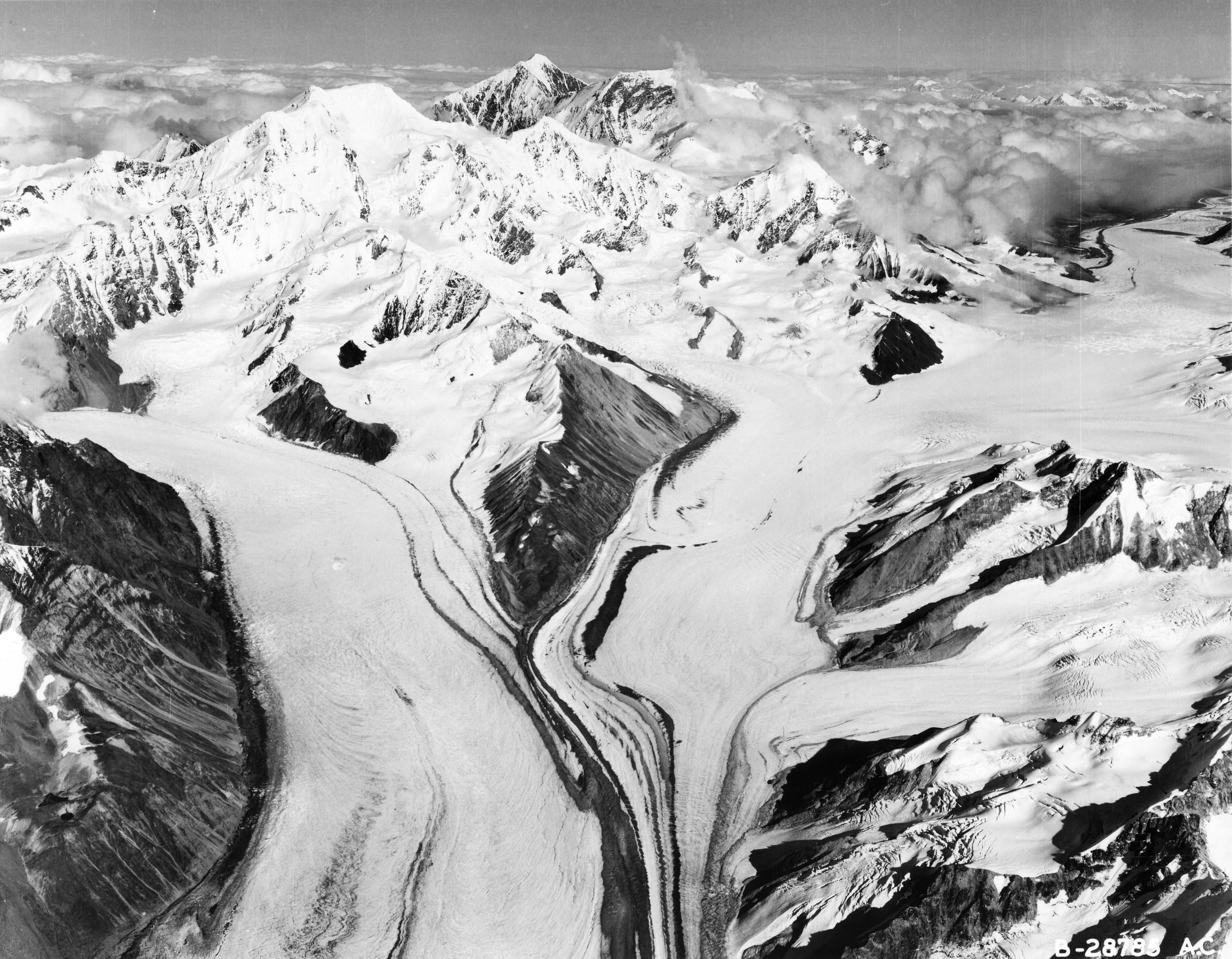
Aerial view of Susitna Glacier flowing from Moby Dick mountain

== See also ==
- Susitna River
- Matanuska-Susitna Valley
- 2002 Denali earthquake
