= Deshka River =

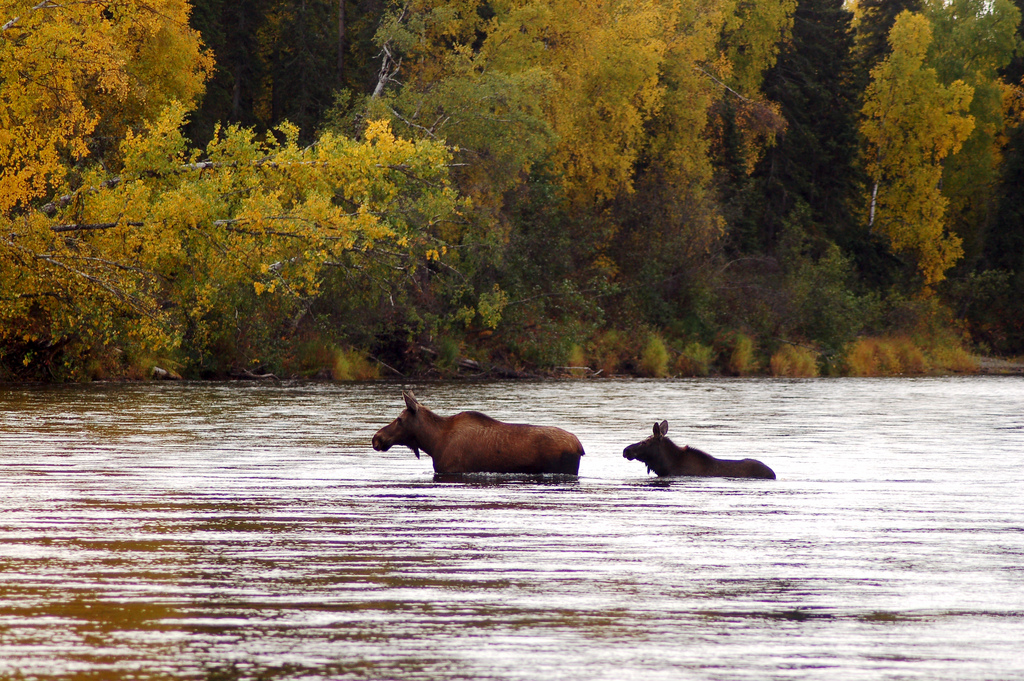
- Deshka River in Southcentral Alaska

Location
- Country: United States
- State: Alaska

Physical characteristics
- Source
  - coordinates: 61°59′15″N 150°23′45″W
  - elevation: 200 ft (61 m)
- Mouth
  - location: Susitna River, South-West of Willow, Alaska and North-East of Susitna, Alaska
  - coordinates: 61°41′34″N 150°18′23″W
  - elevation: 49 ft (15 m)
- Length: 44 mi (71 km)

The Deshka River is a 44 mi (71 km) long river in southern-central Alaska.

The Deshka River is one of Southcentral Alaska's premier sport fishing streams, with significant runs of Chinook and coho salmon, along with resident grayling, burbot, northern pike, and rainbow trout. Located within a roadless area, access to the river is difficult and is made usually by power boat from the Susitna River or by floatplane. The Matanuska-Susitna Borough owns much of the land along the final ten miles of the Deshka. The impacts of summer recreational use and tourists have caused loss of riparian vegetation and bank erosion along the Deshka's lower reaches, which has been partially remedied through a restoration project in the summer of 2002.

== Watershed ==
Heads at the confluence of Kroto Creek and Moose Creek, 3.5 miles (5.6 km) North of Neil Lake, flows south to join the Susitna River.

=== Tributaries ===
- Kroto Creek
- Moose Creek

== See also ==
- List of rivers of Alaska
