= Valdez Creek =

- Location of the mouth of the Valdez Creek in Alaska
- Native name: C'ilaan Na' (Denaʼina)

Location
- Country: United States
- State: Alaska
- District: Matanuska-Susitna Borough

Physical characteristics
- Source: Grogg Lake
  - location: Clearwater Mountains, Hayes Range
  - coordinates: 63°13′0″N 147°5′16″W
- Mouth: Susitna River
  - coordinates: 63°09′28″N 147°30′03″W
  - elevation: 2,467 ft (752 m)
- Length: 15 mi (24 km)

Valdez Creek (Dena'ina: C'ilaan Na') is a small headwater tributary of the Susitna River in the U.S. state of Alaska. It is also home to several gold mines, one of which was the largest placer gold mine in North America and has seen mining activity since the late 1890s.

== Geography ==
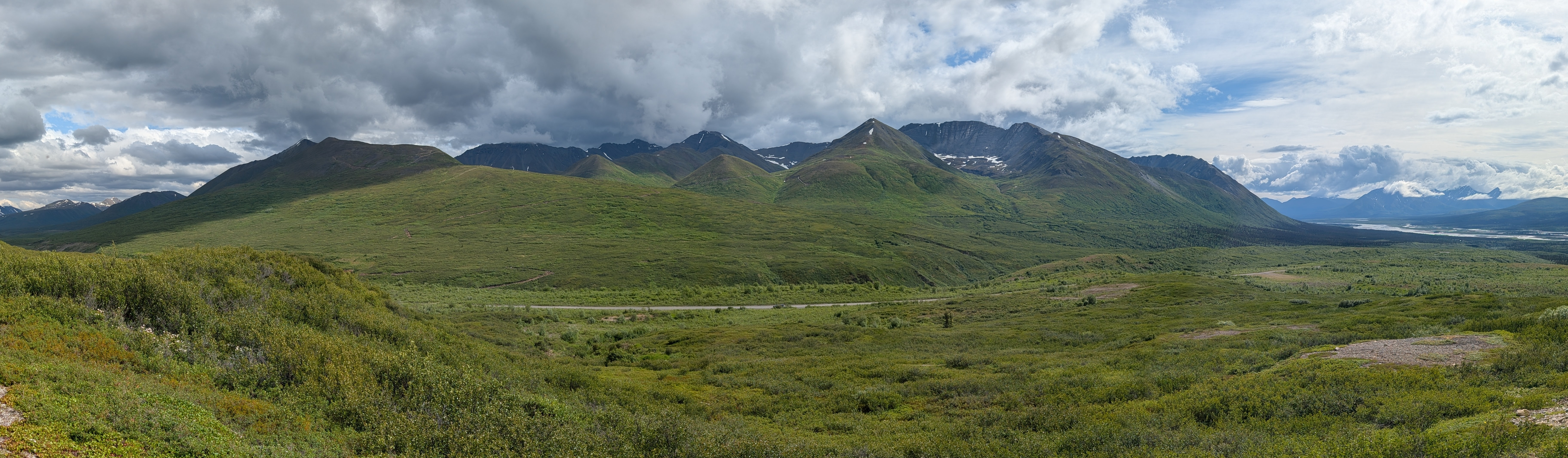
Valdez Creek valley looking south at the Clearwater Mountains from Rusty Hill. The Susitna River is at the far right.

The stream's headwaters start at Grogg Lake in the Clearwater Mountains, a subrange of the Alaska Range. It flows in a general southwesterly direction for about 15 miles (24 km) until it reaches the Susitna River a few miles north of the Denali Highway. From its headwaters, it flows through a glacial valley and is joined by several of its tributaries, but none are longer than 6 miles (10 km). The majority of Valdez Creek's drainage area is above the tree line. After flowing through a narrow canyon that is 30–150 ft (10–50 m) deep, it joins the Susitna River in its broad valley.

It is approximately 160 miles (260 km) north-northwest of Valdez, or 120 miles (190 km) directly south of Fairbanks. It is located nearly halfway between the Richardson Highway and the Alaska Railroad, 60 miles (100 km) west and 50 miles (80 km) east, respectively. Access to the area is via the Denali Highway, at approximately milepost 81.

Valdez Creek has cut its present channel through deep gravels and has intrenched itself in the underlying schist bed rock.

== History ==
Disappointed by failures of prospecting around Sunrise on the Kenai Peninsula in 1896, W.G. Jack and his party followed the Susitna River to its headwaters the next year, the first recorded non-natives to do so. Gold was reportedly first discovered by the party at a creek called "Galina" by the natives in the area. His party named the creek "Swollen Creek" after the healthy mosquito population that lived in the area that had given them numerous bites that became swollen. However, they were forced to abandon the area due to low provisions and looming winter.

Placer deposits were rediscovered on August 15, 1903, by Peter Monahan's party, and it was renamed to Valdez Creek, in honor of their hometown of Valdez. This set off a minor gold rush in 1904, but due to a lack of promising claims, most prospectors left that fall to return to Valdez.

Mining was restricted at the time to two localities on the stream—Lucky Gulch and the vicinity of Discovery claim at the mouth of Willow Creek. A hydraulic plant was installed on Valdez Creek below Willow Creek in 1908 with about 120 men engaged in mining on Valdez Creek during that summer, and around 20 men were permanent residents. Wages were reported as $1/hour, 3 times the normal wage for labor in Seattle. Food was regarded as exceptional as vegetables were grown in the summer and fish and game were plentiful.

The first permanent buildings in the area were built in 1913. By 1917, it was a self-sufficient mining community named "McKinley", likely due to proximity with the then-named Mt. McKinley, with a general store, post office, hydroelectric plant, and more. It was later renamed to "Denali" on August 4, 1922, reflecting the native name of Denali.

Transportation to the area before 1917 depended on the season, but both trails started at Valdez. The summer route started below Gulkana at Bear Creek to "flat country" then went northwesterly for around 130 miles (210 km). The winter route followed the Gulkana River then down the Maclaren River, which provided good conditions for sled transport. Fred Moffit noted that a few supplies arrived from Fairbanks via the Nenana River and Broad Pass. Once the Valdez-Fairbanks Trail was built, a more direct route from Paxson was used. A minority of prospectors used the Copper River and Northwestern Railway out of Cordova to Chitina, then followed previously established trails to Copper Center.

In the summer of 1977, two miners from Talkeetna bulldozed the Denali townsite area, fearing further restrictions on mining after a Bureau of Land Management team visited the former town to do a historical study and assessment.

The Denali Mining Company operated mines in the area from 1979 to 1983, and the Valdez Creek Joint Venture took over in 1984. A few years later, Cambior Mining Company succeeded the previous group. In 1992, the main open-pit mine was the largest placer mine in North America. Between 1984 and 1995, it was the largest gold mine in Alaska in 11 of those 12 years, however it closed in September of that last year.

Reclamation efforts were started after the closure of the mine, and Cambior Lake was created at the site of the old pit mine. However, during these efforts, invasive plants were introduced to the area, including smooth brome and alsike clover. Other invasive plants like foxtail barley, common dandelion, and others were noted on nearly the whole length of the creek when plant surveys were done in 2014.

As of 2021, a total of over 500,000 troy ounces (550,000 oz; 16 t) have been produced from the Valdez Creek area, with the vast majority of the gold being placer deposits. Despite being actively mined since the start of the 20th century, the mother lode for the gold has not been found as of 2023 and mineral surveys suggest that there is high potential for more gold in the area.

== See also ==
- List of rivers of Alaska
