= Mount Susitna =

Mountain in Alaska, United States

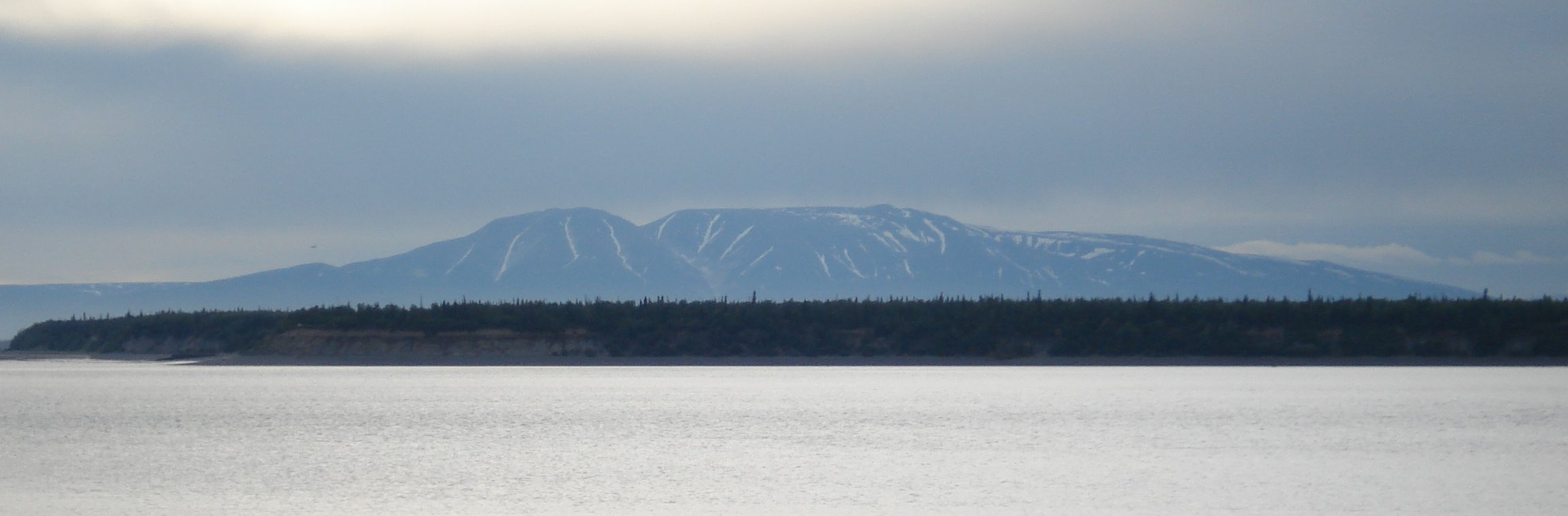
- Looking West at Mount Susitna across the Knik Arm of the Cook Inlet from Anchorage, Alaska

Highest point
- Elevation: 4,396 ft (1,340 m)
- Listing: List of mountain ranges in the world named The Sleeping Lady
- Coordinates: 61°28′27″N 150°44′07″W

Naming
- Native name: Dghelishla (Denaʼina)
- English translation: Sandy River or Little Mountain
- Pronunciation: /sʊˈsɪtnə/

Geography
- Location within Alaska
- Interactive map of Mount Susitna
- Location: Matanuska-Susitna Borough, Alaska, U.S.
- Parent range: [isolated]
- Topo map: USGS Tyonek B-2

Geology
- Mountain type: Summit

Mount Susitna, also known as Sleeping Lady, (Dena'ina: Dghelishla) is a 4,396-foot (1,340 m) mountain in the U.S. state of Alaska. It is located on the west bank of the lower Susitna River, about 33 miles (53 km) northwest of Anchorage, Alaska. The mountain is a prominent landmark in the Anchorage area and can be seen across the Knik Arm of the Cook Inlet from most of the city, especially at higher elevations.

== Etymology and Alaska Native names ==
The mountain's Dena'ina name is Dghelishla, meaning "Little Mountain"; in English it was simply named for the Susitna River, which means Sandy River. "Dinglishna" in Alaska is a similar word which means "Little Ridge that Extends".

== Legends ==
Mount Susitna is often called Sleeping Lady for its resemblance to a recumbent woman. The mountain is associated with a local legend in which a woman belonging to a race of giants vows to sleep until her beloved comes back from battle. The first known printing of the local legend was written by Nancy Lesh and published in 1962. A retelling of the legend was published in a 1994 picture book by Ann Dixon. Dixon and her publisher were sued for their version of the story, but a judge ruled that the story had become a legend and was therefore uncopyrightable.

In "A Dena'ina Legacy," Dena'ina elder Peter Kalifornsky tells the story of the Mountain People who gathered at Susitna, and a giant lady who said she would lie down by the river she loved to become Susitna Mountain. Her relatives followed, Kalifornsky said, to become Mount Redoubt, Mount Iliamna and the Chigmit Mountain Range. Another wandered inland to become Denali.

== Geology ==
=== Pleistocene ===
Mt. Susitna is a roche moutonnée, a landform created when a glacier flows over a resistant, topographically high, bedrock body, creating a smooth-sided and teardrop shaped feature aligned with the direction of ice flow.

The Anchorage bowl topography has been influenced by 5-7 glaciations. Over several thousand years, thick ice sheets from the Talkeetna, Chugach and Alaska Ranges flowed down Cook Inlet. The five well documented glaciations from oldest to most recent were the Mt Susitna, Caribou Hills, Eklutna, Knik and Naptowne. The earliest glaciation in the Anchorage area is known as the Mount Susitna for the erratics and other glacial features found on the top of Mount Susitna. This is the time period when it obtained its characteristic streamlined shape. It is dated to the late Pliocene to the early Pleistocene (2-6 million years ago).

=== Mesozoic ===
Mt. Susitna is part of a suite of Jurassic plutons of quartz monzonite to granodiorite composition.

== See also ==
- List of mountains named The Sleeping Lady
