= Chulitna River (Susitna River tributary) =

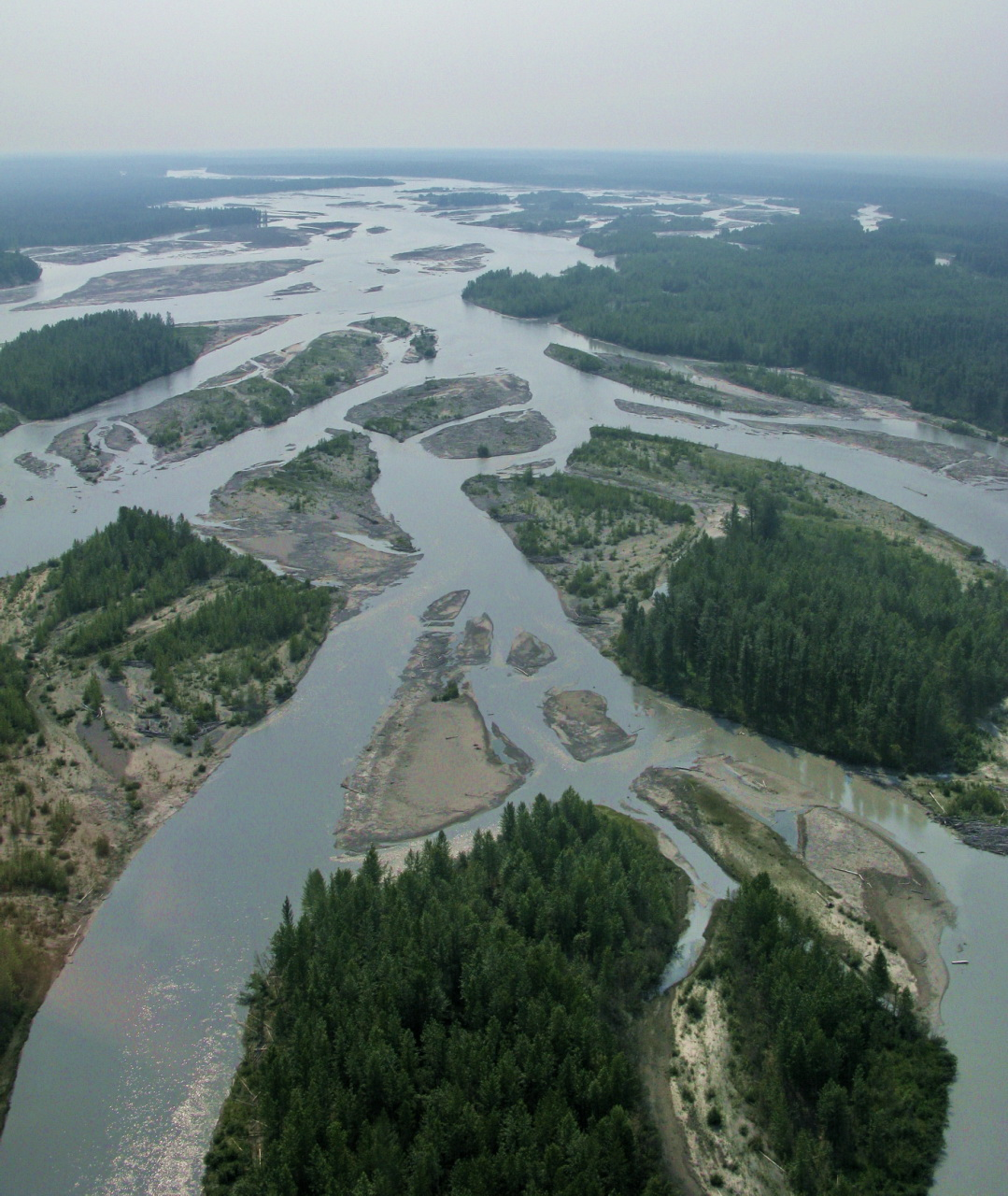
- View of Chulitna, Susitna, and Talkeetna rivers

- Location of the mouth of the Chulitna River in Alaska
- Etymology: Forearm River
- Native name: Ts'ilutnu (Tswana)

Location
- Country: United States
- State: Alaska

Physical characteristics
- Mouth: Susitna River
  - coordinates: 62°20′08″N 150°09′01″W
- Length: 70 mi (110 km)

The Chulitna River (Dena'ina: Ts'ilutnu) is a 110 km long right tributary of the Susitna River in southern part of interior Alaska. Three forks converge to form the river, which itself flows into the Susitna River near Talkeetna.

== Geography ==
Chulitna River originates from the confluence of Middle and East Fork Chulitna River in the valley between the Alaska Range and Talkeetna Mountains east of Denali, flows in a southerly direction to Talkeetna, where both it and the Talkeetna River empty into the Susitna River, which flows into Cook Inlet. Larger tributaries include West Fork Chulitna River, Ohio Creek, Fountain River, Hidden River, Coffee River and Tokositna River, all from the right. The catchment area of the Chulitna River covers about 6600 km^{2}. The mean discharge near the mouth is 250 m³ / s. The highest monthly discharges of the river, which is mainly fed by glacial meltwater, occur in the months of June to August.

The George Parks Highway from Anchorage to Fairbanks runs parallel to the entire river.

The name of the river is of local Alaska's natives and was documented in 1898 by G.H. Eldridge.

== Climate ==
The Chulitna River weather station is located near the Historic Chulitna River Lodge. Chulitna River has a subarctic climate (Köppen Dfc).

Climate data for Chulitna River, Alaska, 1991–2020 normals, 1971-2020 extremes: 1354ft (413m)
Month	Jan	Feb	Mar	Apr	May	Jun	Jul	Aug	Sep	Oct	Nov	Dec	Year
Record high °F (°C)	43 (6)	50 (10)	52 (11)	65 (18)	84 (29)	92 (33)	90 (32)	87 (31)	75 (24)	65 (18)	49 (9)	45 (7)	92 (33)
Mean daily maximum °F (°C)	18.8 (−7.3)	24.1 (−4.4)	30.1 (−1.1)	42.7 (5.9)	55.1 (12.8)	65.7 (18.7)	66.6 (19.2)	61.9 (16.6)	51.8 (11.0)	37.3 (2.9)	24.3 (−4.3)	20.8 (−6.2)	41.6 (5.3)
Daily mean °F (°C)	9.6 (−12.4)	14.0 (−10.0)	17.4 (−8.1)	29.2 (−1.6)	40.5 (4.7)	50.7 (10.4)	53.8 (12.1)	49.9 (9.9)	40.2 (4.6)	27.3 (−2.6)	15.6 (−9.1)	11.9 (−11.2)	30.0 (−1.1)
Mean daily minimum °F (°C)	0.3 (−17.6)	3.9 (−15.6)	4.7 (−15.2)	15.7 (−9.1)	25.9 (−3.4)	35.7 (2.1)	41.1 (5.1)	37.9 (3.3)	28.5 (−1.9)	17.4 (−8.1)	6.8 (−14.0)	3.0 (−16.1)	18.4 (−7.5)
Record low °F (°C)	−34 (−37)	−29 (−34)	−27 (−33)	−6 (−21)	6 (−14)	16 (−9)	26 (−3)	27 (−3)	−3 (−19)	−9 (−23)	−19 (−28)	−36 (−38)	−36 (−38)
Average precipitation inches (mm)	1.87 (47)	1.70 (43)	1.37 (35)	1.05 (27)	1.35 (34)	1.90 (48)	3.15 (80)	5.54 (141)	5.44 (138)	2.76 (70)	2.84 (72)	2.49 (63)	31.46 (798)
Average snowfall inches (cm)	28.9 (73)	29.4 (75)	22.7 (58)	13.6 (35)	2.1 (5.3)	0.0 (0.0)	0.0 (0.0)	0.0 (0.0)	1.7 (4.3)	16.2 (41)	35.8 (91)	37.5 (95)	187.9 (477.6)
Source 1: NOAA (1981-2010 snowfall)
Source 2: XMACIS2 (records)
