= Salamatof, Alaska =

Salamatof, Alaska Ken Dech’etl’t
- Census-designated place
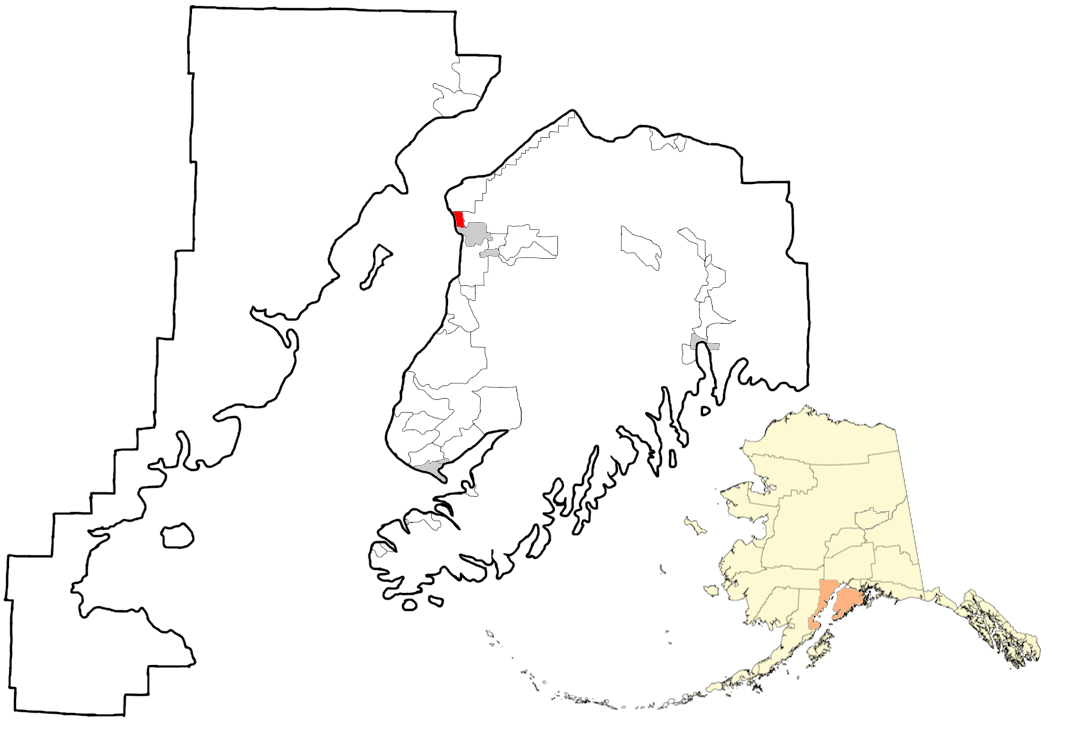
- Location in Kenai Peninsula Borough, Alaska
- Coordinates: 60°35′36″N 151°18′38″W
- Country: United States
- State: Alaska
- Census Area: Kenai Peninsula Borough

Government
  - Borough mayor: Peter Micciche
  - State senator: Jesse Bjorkman (R)
  - State rep.: Ben Carpenter (R)

Area
  - Total: 8.20 sq mi (21.24 km^{2})
  - Land: 8.03 sq mi (20.80 km^{2})
  - Water: 0.17 sq mi (0.44 km^{2})

Population (2020)
  - Total: 1,078
  - Density: 134.2/sq mi (51.83/km^{2})
- ZIP code: 99611
- Area code: 907
- FIPS code: 02-66510

Salamatof (Dena'ina: Ken Dech’etl’t) is a census-designated place (CDP) in Kenai Peninsula Borough, Alaska, United States. The population was 1,078 at the 2020 census, up from 980 in 2010. Salamatof is the location for the former Wildwood Air Force Station, which operated from 1965 to 1972 (from 1951 to 1965, it was an Army Station). Today, it is the Wildwood Correctional Complex.

== Geography ==
Salamatof is located on the western side of the Kenai Peninsula at 60°35′36″N 151°18′38″W (60.593250, -151.310547), and comprises populated areas between the city of Kenai to the south and unincorporated Nikiski to the north. It is bordered to the west by Cook Inlet.

According to the United States Census Bureau, the Salamatof CDP has a total area of 8.3 square miles (21.4 km^{2}), of which 8.1 square miles (21.0 km^{2}) are land and 0.2 square miles (0.4 km^{2}), or 2.05%, are water.

== Demographics ==
Historical population
Census	Pop.	Note	%±
1980	334		—
1990	999		199.1%
2000	954		−4.5%
2010	980		2.7%
2020	1,078		10.0%
U.S. Decennial Census

Salamatof first appeared on the 1980 U.S. Census as a census-designated place (CDP).

Its predecessor was Wildwood Air Force Station, which appeared on the 1970 census, and was located on the southeast side of the CDP. It had 750 residents stationed there before its closure in 1972.

=== 2020 census ===
As of the 2020 census, Salamatof had a population of 1,078. The median age was 40.8 years. 14.7% of residents were under the age of 18 and 13.6% of residents were 65 years of age or older. For every 100 females there were 219.9 males, and for every 100 females age 18 and over there were 252.1 males age 18 and over.

4.5% of residents lived in urban areas, while 95.5% lived in rural areas.

There were 244 households in Salamatof, of which 25.0% had children under the age of 18 living in them. Of all households, 51.6% were married-couple households, 19.3% were households with a male householder and no spouse or partner present, and 24.2% were households with a female householder and no spouse or partner present. About 31.2% of all households were made up of individuals and 16.0% had someone living alone who was 65 years of age or older.

There were 329 housing units, of which 25.8% were vacant. The homeowner vacancy rate was 8.2% and the rental vacancy rate was 0.0%.

Racial composition as of the 2020 census
Race	Number	Percent
White	761	70.6%
Black or African American	27	2.5%
American Indian and Alaska Native	189	17.5%
Asian	5	0.5%
Native Hawaiian and Other Pacific Islander	3	0.3%
Some other race	13	1.2%
Two or more races	80	7.4%
Hispanic or Latino (of any race)	22	2.0%

=== 2000 census ===
As of the census of 2000, there were 954 people, 220 households, and 163 families residing in the CDP. The population density was 117.7 inhabitants per square mile (45.4/km^{2}). There were 282 housing units at an average density of 34.8 per square mile (13.4/km^{2}). The racial makeup of the CDP was 71.80% White, 3.35% Black or African American, 19.92% Native American, 0.52% Asian, 0.10% Pacific Islander, 0.94% from other races, and 3.35% from two or more races. 3.35% of the population were Hispanic or Latino of any race.

There were 220 households, out of which 35.5% had children under the age of 18 living with them, 60.9% were married couples living together, 8.2% had a female householder with no husband present, and 25.9% were non-families. 20.5% of all households were made up of individuals, and 3.6% had someone living alone who was 65 years of age or older. The average household size was 2.65 and the average family size was 3.04.

In the CDP, the population was spread out, with 17.3% under the age of 18, 10.9% from 18 to 24, 39.2% from 25 to 44, 25.1% from 45 to 64, and 7.5% who were 65 years of age or older. The median age was 37 years. For every 100 females, there were 214.9 males. For every 100 females age 18 and over, there were 253.8 males.

The median income for a household in the CDP was $44,861, and the median income for a family was $46,719. Males had a median income of $40,250 versus $31,250 for females. The per capita income for the CDP was $16,306. About 11.9% of families and 11.9% of the population were below the poverty line, including 14.4% of those under age 18 and 7.7% of those age 65 or over.
