= Alexander Creek, Alaska =

Unincorporated community in the state of Alaska, United States

Alexander Creek, Alaska Tuqen Kaq' Alexander, Alaska
- Alaska Native Village Corporation
- Location of Alexander Creek in the state of Alaska
- Coordinates (USGS GNIS 2419533): 61°25′18″N 150°36′0″W
- Country: United States
- State: Alaska
- Borough: Matanuska-Susitna
- Township: T15N R7W Seward Meridian

Government
  - Borough mayor: Vern Halter
  - President of village corporation: Stephanie Thiele Thompson

Area
  - Total: 56.8 sq mi (147 km^{2})
- Elevation: 33 ft (10 m)

Population (1990)
  - Total: 40
- Time zone: UTC-9 (Alaska (AKST))
  - Summer (DST): UTC-8 (AKDT)
- ZIP code: 99645
- Area code: 907
- FIPS code: 02-01655
- GNIS feature ID: 2419533

Alexander (Dena'ina: Tuqen Kaq’) is an unincorporated community in Matanuska-Susitna Borough, Alaska, United States. An Alaska Native community with an Alaska Native Village Corporation, it lies on the Susitna River delta, near the mouth of Alexander Creek, and 27 miles (43 km) northwest of Anchorage, Alaska Cook Inlet Low. It is located within the boundaries of Susitna CDP.

== History ==
Alexander is located at 61°25′2″N 150°35′49″W, elevation: 30 feet (9.1 m). It is a small, 2.4 miles (3.9 km) long, Indian village which was reported in 1898 by Eldridge (1900, map 3).

== Geography ==
Alexander lies on the west bank of Alexander Creek near its confluence with the big Susitna River (about 10 miles (16 km) above the Susitna River mouth on Cook Inlet of the Pacific Ocean); approximately 27 miles (43 km) northwest of Anchorage, Alaska in the Matanuska-Susitna Borough, Alaska and the Anchorage Recording District.

- ANVSA Name Alexander, AK
- Land Area 56.8 square miles (147 km^{2})

The community is surrounded by federal and state forest lands.

== Demographics ==
Historical population
Census	Pop.	Note	%±
1980	11		—
1990	40		263.6%
U.S. Decennial Census

Alexander appeared on the 1980 and 1990 U.S. Census as an unincorporated Native Village (ANVSA). It has not appeared separately since and is instead located within the boundaries of the Susitna CDP.

== Economy ==
Alexander's economy is primarily a subsistence one: living off the land, supplemented by tourism (fishing/hunting guides) and harvesting/selling some renewable natural resources.

== Government ==
Alexander Creek is part of the Matanuska-Susitna Borough.

=== Alaska Native Village Corporation ===
Alexander Creek, Incorporated is an Alaska Native Corporation, incorporated under the Alaska Native Claims Settlement Act.

== See also ==
- ANCSA Alaska Native Village Corporations
- Alaska Native Village Corporations
