= Chickaloon, Alaska =

Village in Matanuska-Susitna Borough, Alaska

Chickaloon, Alaska Nay’dini’aa Na’
- CDP
- Location in Matanuska-Susitna Borough and the state of Alaska
- Coordinates: 61°47′38″N 148°28′58″W
- Country: United States
- State: Alaska
- Borough: Matanuska-Susitna

Government
  - Borough mayor: Edna DeVries
  - State senator: Mike Shower (R)
  - State rep.: George Rauscher (R)

Area
  - Total: 67.87 sq mi (175.78 km^{2})
  - Land: 67.09 sq mi (173.77 km^{2})
  - Water: 0.78 sq mi (2.01 km^{2})
- Elevation: 1,004 ft (306 m)

Population (2020)
  - Total: 254
  - Density: 3.8/sq mi (1.46/km^{2})
- Time zone: UTC-9 (Alaska (AKST))
  - Summer (DST): UTC-8 (AKDT)
- ZIP code: 99674
- Area code: 907
- FIPS code: 02-13340
- GNIS feature ID: 1400239

Chickaloon (Nay’dini’aa Na’ in Ahtna Athabascan; Nuk'din'itnu' in Dena'ina) is a native village in Matanuska-Susitna Borough, Alaska, United States. It is part of the Anchorage, Alaska Metropolitan Statistical Area. The population was 254 at the 2020 census, down from 272 in 2010.

The Alaska Native people of Chickaloon are a mixture of Ahtna and Dena'ina Athabaskan.

On May 31, 2021, an M6.1 Earthquake struck Chickaloon.

== Geography ==
Chickaloon is located at 61°47′38″N 148°28′58″W (61.793994, -148.482733).

According to the United States Census Bureau, the CDP has a total area of 80.2 square miles (208 km^{2}), of which 79.4 square miles (206 km^{2}) is land and 0.8 square miles (2.1 km^{2}) (1.05%) is water.

== Demographics ==
Historical population
Census	Pop.	Note	%±
1930	28		—
1940	11		−60.7%
1960	43		—
1990	145		—
2000	213		46.9%
2010	272		27.7%
2020	254		−6.6%
U.S. Decennial Census

Chickaloon first appeared on the 1930 U.S. Census as an unincorporated village. It appeared again on the 1940 & 1960 censuses, but was not returned separately in 1950, 1970 & 1980. It returned again beginning in 1990, when it was made a census-designated place.

As of the census of 2000, there were 213 people, 87 households, and 58 families residing in the CDP. The population density was 2.7 inhabitants per square mile (1.0/km^{2}). There were 208 housing units at an average density of 2.6 per square mile (1.0/km^{2}). The racial makeup of the CDP was 77.93% White, 1.41% Black or African American, 15.49% Native American, 0.94% Asian, 0.00% Pacific Islander, 1.88% from other races, and 2.35% from two or more races. 1.41% of the population were Hispanic or Latino of any race.

There were 87 households, out of which 31.0% had children under the age of 18 living with them, 58.6% were married couples living together, 3.4% had a female householder with no husband present, and 33.3% were non-families. 25.3% of all households were made up of individuals, and 4.6% had someone living alone who was 65 years of age or older. The average household size was 2.45 and the average family size was 3.00.

In the CDP, the population was spread out, with 25.4% under the age of 18, 3.3% from 18 to 24, 23.0% from 25 to 44, 41.8% from 45 to 64, and 6.6% who were 65 years of age or older. The median age was 44 years. For every 100 females, there were 129.0 males. For every 100 females age 18 and over, there were 120.8 males.

The median income for a household in the CDP was $49,792, and the median income for a family was $49,792. Males had a median income of $41,827 versus $36,607 for females. The per capita income for the CDP was $14,755. None of the families and 2.8% of the population were living below the poverty line.

== Education ==
The Ya Ne Dah Ah School teaches the Ahtna Athabaskan language as a part of its curriculum.

== In popular culture ==
In 2020, the town's school students were featured in an educational segment about Chickaloon and map keys during Molly of Denali episode "By Sled or By Snowshoe."

== See also ==
- List of census-designated places in Alaska
