= Matanuska-Susitna Valley =

Valley in Southcentral Alaska, north of Anchorage

Coordinates: 61°23′N 150°15′W

Map of the region

Matanuska-Susitna Valley (/mætəˈnuːskə suːˈsɪtnə/; known locally as the Mat-Su or The Valley) is an area in Southcentral Alaska south of the Alaska Range about 35 miles (56 km) north of Anchorage, Alaska. It is known for the world-record-sized cabbages and other vegetables displayed annually in Palmer at the Alaska State Fair. It includes the valleys of the Matanuska, Knik, and Susitna Rivers. 11,000 Mat-Su Valley residents commute to Anchorage for work, as of 2008. It is the fastest-growing region in Alaska and includes the towns of Palmer, Wasilla, Big Lake, Houston, Willow, Sutton, and Talkeetna. The Matanuska-Susitna Valley is primarily the land of the Dena'ina and Ahtna Athabaskan people.

The valleys are shaped by three mountain ranges: the Alaska Range, the Talkeetna Mountains, and the Chugach Mountains. The Matanuska-Susitna Valley was carved by glaciers, leaving thousands of lakes. The Mat-Su rivers and lakes are home to the spawning grounds of chinook, coho, sockeye, pink, and chum salmon. The area is home to 31 state parks and campgrounds.

The 23,000-square-mile (60,000 km^{2}) Matanuska-Susitna Borough (the Alaskan equivalent of a county) governs the Mat-Su Valley. According to the 2020 Census, the borough's population is 107,081, a 21.7% increase since 2010.

The City of Wasilla was founded on Dena'ina land when the Alaska Railroad was constructed in 1917. Knik, also on Dena'ina land, was the first boom-town in the valley and predates Wasilla. In 1893 the Alaska Commercial Company was built at Knik, and in 1898 Knik was settled by trappers and gold miners.

Talkeetna began in the late 1890s, with the construction of a trading station and later the Alaska Railroad. Today, Talkeetna serves as a tourist hotspot, and the starting point for mountaineers who climb Denali.

The Mat-Su Valley was explored by Russians in 1818.

In 1935, as part of the New Deal, 203 families from the Midwest traveled to Alaska and started the Matanuska Valley Colony. Families were specifically chosen from the states of Minnesota, Wisconsin and Michigan, due to their similarly cold winter climates. The family’s collective relocation was fictionalized in a chapter of the 1988 novel Alaska by James A. Michener.

The 1939 Slattery Report on Alaskan development identified the region as one of the areas where new settlements would be established through Jewish immigration. This plan was never implemented.

The region is also home to the Matanuska-Susitna College and the Mat-Su Valley Frontiersman newspaper.

== See also ==
- Anchorage metropolitan area
- Goose Bay Airport (Alaska)
- Matanuska Formation
- Matanuska-Susitna Borough, Alaska
