= Talkeetna River =

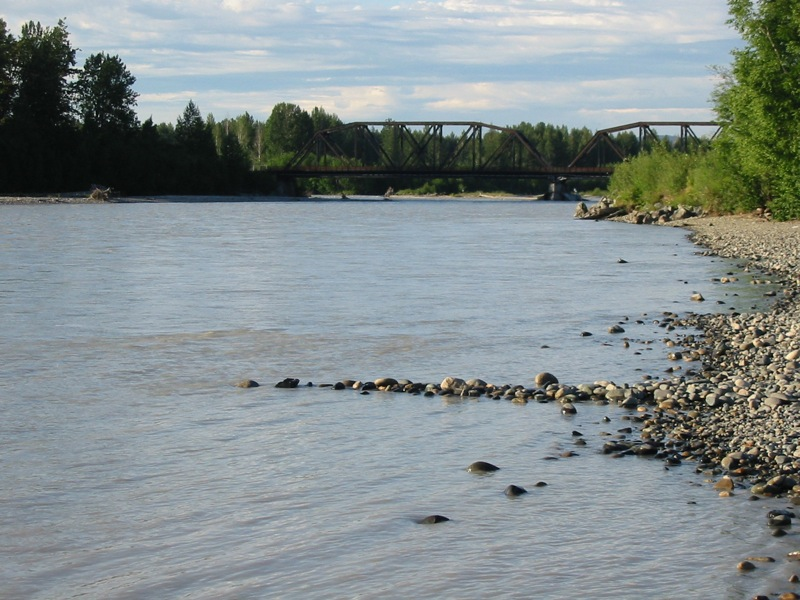
- Talkeetna River in Southcentral Alaska

- Location of the mouth of the Talkeetna River in Alaska

Location
- Country: United States
- State: Alaska
- Borough: Matanuska-Susitna

Physical characteristics
- Source
  - coordinates: 62°10′54″N 148°29′7″W Talkeetna Glacier
  - elevation: 4,250 ft (1,300 m)
- Mouth
  - coordinates: 62°19′31″N 150°7′13″W Susitna River near Talkeetna, Alaska
  - elevation: 299 ft (91 m)
- Length: 85 mi (137 km)

The Talkeetna River (Taa’i Na’ in Ahtna; K'dalkitnu in Dena'ina) is a river in Alaska.

== History ==
Tanaina Indian name reported in 1898 to mean "river of plenty" by G. H. Eldridge and Robert Muldrow, United States Geological Survey. or as K'dalkitnu (″food is stored river″).

Also known as:

- Talkeet River
- Talkeetno River
- Talkutna River

== Watershed ==
Heads at Talkeetna Glacier in Talkeetna Mountains at 62°11′00″N 148°29′00″W, flows North-West and South-West to Susitna River at Talkeetna, Alaska; Cook Inlet Low.

== See also ==
- List of rivers of Alaska
