= Susitna River =

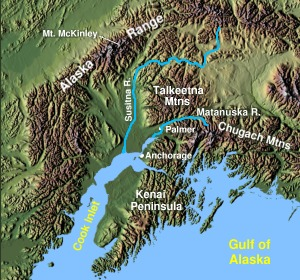
- Susitna River in Southcentral Alaska

- Location of the mouth of the Susitna River in Alaska

Location
- Country: United States

Physical characteristics
- Source
  - coordinates: 63°26′10″N 147°11′55″W Susitna Glacier on Mount Hayes
  - elevation: 2,500 ft (760 m)
- Mouth
  - coordinates: 61°16′14″N 150°34′33″W Cook Inlet of Pacific Ocean, at Matanuska-Susitna Borough, Alaska
  - elevation: 0 ft (0 m)
- Length: 313 mi (504 km)
- Basin size: 20,000 sq mi (52,000 km^{2})
- Discharge
  - average: 51,000 cu ft/s (1,400 m^{3}/s) at mouth

The Susitna River (/suːˈsɪtnə/; Ahtena: Sasutna’; Denaʼina: Susitnu) is a 313-mile (504 km) long river in the Southcentral Alaska. It is the 15th largest river in the United States, ranked by average discharge volume at its mouth. The river stretches from the Susitna Glacier to Cook Inlet's Knik Arm.

== Etymology and history ==
The Susitna River was named by the Dena'ina Alaska Native people meaning "sandy river" (Denaʼina: Susitnu). The river appears to have been first explored by outsiders in 1834 by a "Creole [Indian] named Malakov" and the name may have been obtained by the Russians at that time, recorded by the Russia Hydrography Department on chart 1378 dated 1847 as Р(ека) Сушитна (R(eka) Sušitna) "Sushitna River". The present spelling of the name has evolved due to euphemistic reasons. The 1890 census reported that Susitna Village on the east bank of the river had 146 Kenai Natives and 27 houses.

== Description ==
The Susitna River heads at Susitna Glacier, in Alaska Range, flows southwest to Cook Inlet, 24 miles (39 km) west of Anchorage, Alaska Cook Inlet Low.

There are several rivers flowing into the Susitna River including East Fork Susitna River and West Fork Susitna River. The Little Susitna River is a separate river system which flows into the Cook Inlet on the other side of Susitna Flats.

The Susitna along with the Matanuska River, drains the broad Matanuska-Susitna Valley south of the Alaska Range.

It rises in the Susitna Glacier on Mount Hayes in the Alaska Range near 63°30′N 147°15′W. It flows in winding course generally southwest to Curry, then south, along the west side of the Talkeetna Mountains, past Talkeetna, Chulitna River, and Susitna, and drains into Cook Inlet approximately 25 miles (40 km) west of Anchorage.

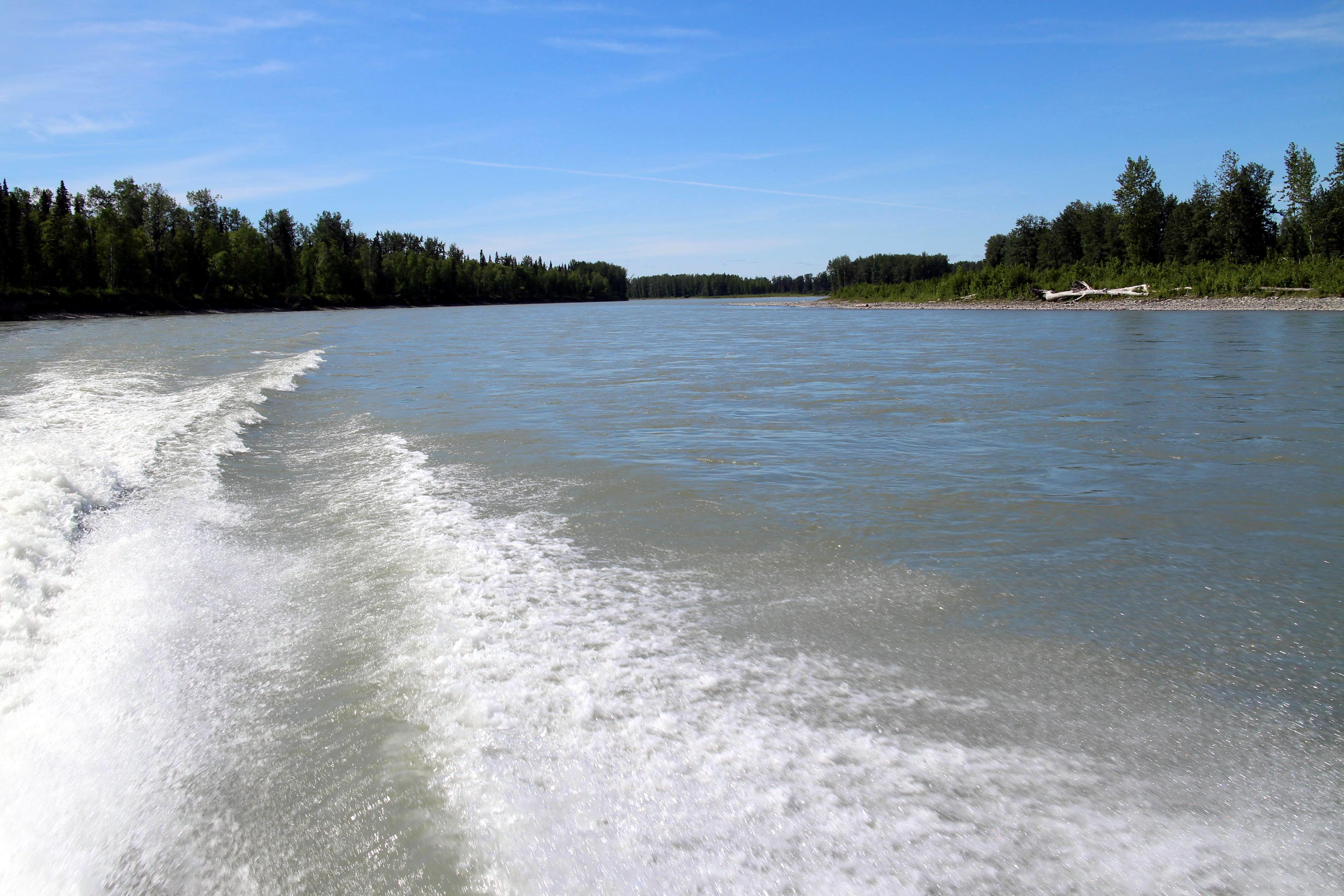
Susitna River on a clear sunny day in June 2015 near Talkeetna.

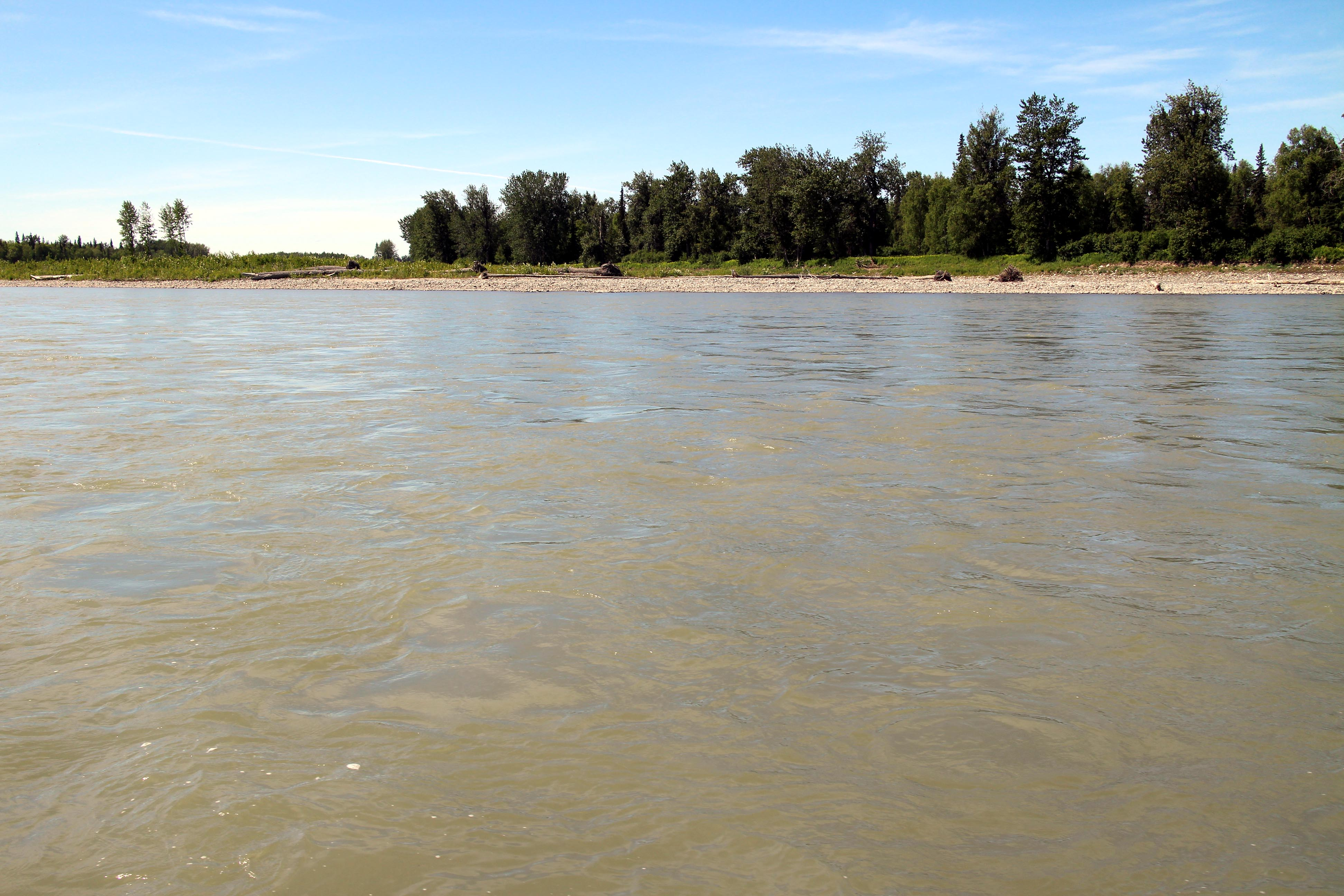
Susitna River on a clear sunny day in June 2015 near Talkeetna.

It receives the Yentna River from the northwest approximately 5 miles (8 km) north of Susitna. It is navigable to 85 mile (137 km) upstream from its mouth to Talkeetna. Valdez Creek, notable for its 1903 gold mining, is one of the small headwater tributaries of Susitna River.

The Susitna River is one of Southcentral Alaska's premier sport fishing streams, with significant runs of Chinook and Coho salmon, along with resident grayling, burbot, and rainbow trout. Located within a roadless area, access to the river is difficult and is made usually by power boat or by floatplane.

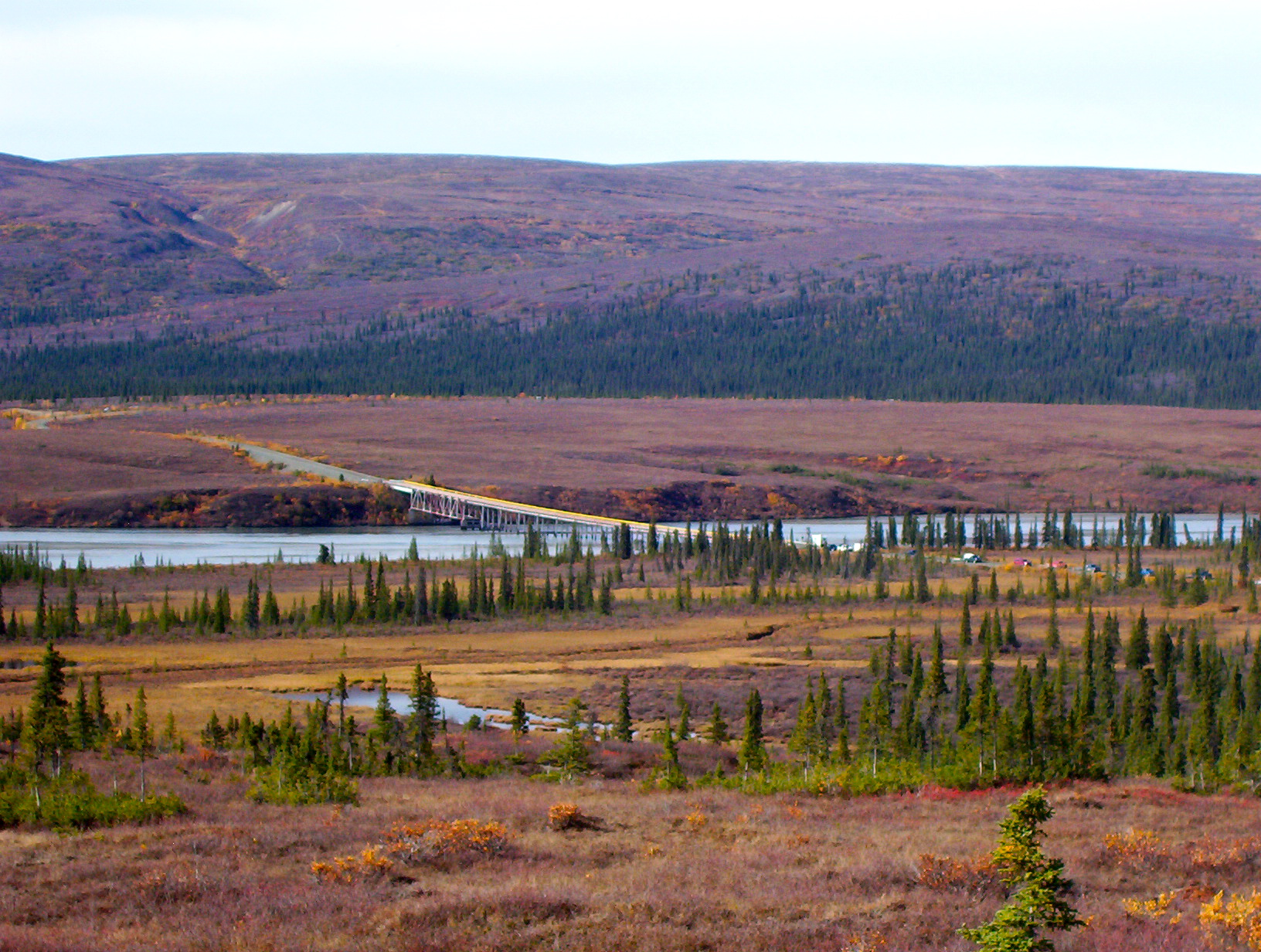
The Denali Highway crosses the upper Susitna river

Matanuska-Susitna Borough owns much of the land along the Susitna and Deshka Rivers. The impacts of summer recreational use and tourists have caused loss of riparian vegetation and bank erosion along the Deshka River's lower reaches, which has been partially remedied through a restoration project in the summer of 2002. However, the borough currently lacks either regulations to prevent further damage or the means to enforce such regulations.

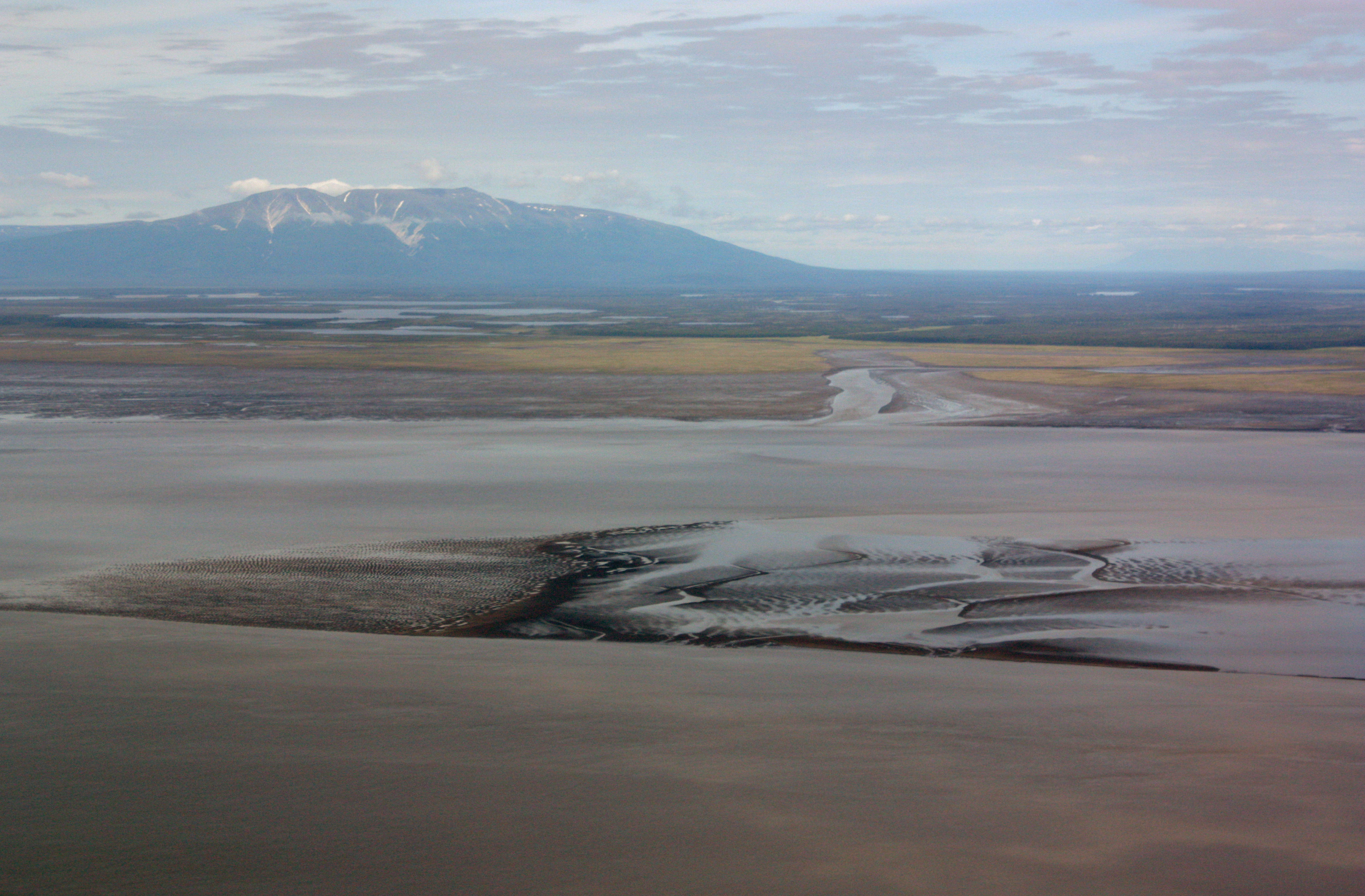
Susitna River delta with Mount Susitna on the left skyline.

== Geology ==
The Susitna Basin, is located about 50 miles from Anchorage. As of a 2018 USGS assessment, it probably contains technically recoverable oil and gas resources using current technology—in rocks of Tertiary age (about 66 to 2.6 million years old)

== Location ==
Susitna River is on the North side of Cook Inlet 22 miles (35 km) North-East of North Foreland. Mount Susitna, a prominent landmark along the upper part of the inlet, is about 6 miles (10 km) West of the Susitna River at a point 13 miles (21 km) above the mouth.

The channels across the flats at the mouth of Susitna River have depths of 2 feet (610 mm) or less at low water and change during the winter and spring because of ice and freshet action. The channels above the mouth are said to change frequently in the spring and early summer.

Launches navigate Susitna River to Yentna River, about 20 miles (32 km) above Cook Inlet, thence run occasionally up the Yentna River to the forks about 65 miles (105 km) from the Susitna River. The tides are not felt more than 7 miles (11 km) from the inlet, and above this the current is swift. Overhead power cables with a least clearance of 37 feet (11 m) cross the Susitna River about 5 miles (8 km) above its mouth.

Alexander, Alaska is a small settlement on the west side of Susitna River 10 miles (16 km) above the mouth. Susitna, Alaska is on the East side 18 miles (29 km) above the mouth and just below the mouth of the Yentna River; launches run to and from Anchorage, Alaska. Mail is delivered to both settlements twice monthly by airplane from Anchorage, Alaska.

Susitna Flats lie between big Susitna River and Little Susitna River and to the East of the latter.

Susitna Flats Light (61°15′10″N 150°29′17″W), 19 feet (5.8 m) above the water, is shown from a skeleton tower and is equipped with a racon.

Little Susitna River, 9 miles (14 km) West of Point MacKenzie, is said to be navigable for landing craft and skiffs at high water for about 8 miles (13 km).

The depths offshore and in the approach to Little Susitna River are subject to drastic and continual change.

== Bridges ==
The Susitna River Bridge is a railroad bridge of the Alaska Railroad in south-central Alaska. It spans the Susitna River on the eastern edge of Denali State Park near Gold Creek. The bridge is on the National Register of Historic Places.

Construction of the bridge took place from October 1920 to February 1921. The span is 503 ft., with a height of 71 ft. in the center; the steel weighs 2,000 tons, and rests on two concrete piers, each 50 ft. high and 70 x 40 ft. in cross-section, and each containing 1,500 cubic yards of concrete. The location was chosen, just downstream of a curve, after observing the pattern of ice jams through the preceding three years.

It is bridged by the George Parks Highway south of Talkeetna. South of that point, there are no other bridges, which contributes to the isolation of southwest Alaska.

== Ice ==
Between approximately October 19 and November 14 the Susitna River ices or freezes over for the winter. Between April 12 and May 10 the ice breaks-up for the summer.

== Tributaries ==
- East Fork Susitna River
- West Fork Susitna River
- Yentna River
- Deshka River
- Talkeetna River
- Chulitna River
- Oshetna River
- Tyone River
- Maclaren River
- Valdez Creek

== See also ==
- List of rivers of Alaska
