= Susitna, Alaska =

- Census-designated place
- Location in Matanuska-Susitna Borough and the state of Alaska

- Location within the state of Alaska
- Coordinates: 61°33′27″N 150°34′36″W
- Country: United States
- State: Alaska
- Borough: Matanuska-Susitna

Government
  - Borough mayor: Edna DeVries
  - State senator: Mike Shower (R)
  - State rep.: Kevin McCabe (R)

Area
  - Total: 218.76 sq mi (566.59 km^{2})
  - Land: 216.02 sq mi (559.48 km^{2})
  - Water: 2.75 sq mi (7.11 km^{2})
- Elevation: 33 ft (10 m)

Population (2020)
  - Total: 11
  - Density: 0.052/sq mi (0.02/km^{2})
- Time zone: UTC-9 (Alaska (AKST))
  - Summer (DST): UTC-8 (AKDT)
- Area code: 907
- FIPS code: 02-74340
- GNIS feature ID: 1410439

Susitna is a census-designated place (CDP) in Matanuska-Susitna Borough, Alaska, United States. It is part of the Anchorage Metropolitan Area. As of the 2020 census, the population of the CDP was 11.

Susitna was once home to the legendary Athabaskan elder, historian and ethnologist Shem Pete (c1896-1989), who documented countless locations travelling thousands of miles within the Matanuska-Susitna region. His works were published in Shem Pete's Alaska: The Territory of the Upper Cook Inlet Dena'ina.

== Geography ==
Susitna is located in southwestern Matanuska-Susitna Borough at 61°33′27″N 150°34′36″W (61.557631, -150.576743). It is primarily on the west side of the Susitna River, north of where the river flows into Cook Inlet. A portion of the CDP containing the actual settlement of Susitna is on the east side of the river, about 22 miles (35 km) as the crow flies southwest of Houston and 35 miles (56 km) west of Wasilla.

According to the United States Census Bureau, the Susitna CDP has a total area of 218.8 square miles (567 km^{2}), of which 216.0 square miles (559 km^{2}) are land and 2.7 square miles (7.0 km^{2}), or 1.25%, are water.

== Demographics and history ==
Historical population
Census	Pop.	Note	%±
1880	90		—
1890	142		57.8%
1910	233		—
1920	48		−79.4%
1930	91		89.6%
1940	12		−86.8%
1960	42		—
2000	37		—
2010	18		−51.4%
2020	11		−38.9%
U.S. Decennial Census

Susitna first appeared on the 1880 U.S. Census as the unincorporated Tinneh villages of Sushetno (combined total of 90 residents, all Tinneh, although they were listed separately as "Sushetno (1st) and (2nd) Villages" (with a population of 44 and 46, respectively). It was not specified which was the present village of Susitna. In 1890, it returned as "Sushitna" (including 2 other villages on Susitna River). All of the residents were Native. It did not return on the 1900 census. In 1910, it returned as Susitna, with a peak population of 233. It returned in 1920 as "Susitna Station."

In 1930, census enumerators returned it as two separate places: "Susitna" and "Susitna Station." It was divided on race, with Susitna Station (population 52), having 51 White residents and 1 Native and Susitna being the "native village", with 39 residents (all native). Depending upon the boundaries of the recording districts (whose maps have not confirmed which side of the 3rd Judicial District they were located within), each was listed in two different districts: Susitna was located in Talkeetna and Susitna Station in Wasilla. This may be erroneous, but further research is needed on the matter.

In 1940, it returned as "Susitna Station" again, with just 12 residents. It did not report again until 1960, when it returned as Susitna. It would not appear again after that until 2000, when Susitna was made a census-designated place (CDP). It was greatly enlarged from its original location on the east bank of the Susitna River to take in both sides of the river, and now the bulk of its area is on the west bank today.

As of the census of 2000, there were 37 people, 19 households, and 6 families residing in the CDP. The population density was 0.2 inhabitants per square mile (0.077/km^{2}). There were 102 housing units at an average density of 0.6 per square mile (0.23/km^{2}). The racial makeup of the CDP was 89.19% white, and 10.81% from two or more races.

There were 19 households, out of which 15.8% had children under the age of 18 living with them, 26.3% were married couples living together, 10.5% had a female householder with no husband present, and 63.2% were non-families. 47.4% of all households were made up of individuals, and 26.3% had someone living alone who was 65 years of age or older. The average household size was 1.95 and the average family size was 3.14.

In the CDP, the population was spread out, with 21.6% under the age of 18, 5.4% from 18 to 24, 24.3% from 25 to 44, 27.0% from 45 to 64, and 21.6% who were 65 years of age or older. The median age was 44 years. For every 100 females, there were 105.6 males. For every 100 females age 18 and over, there were 107.1 males.

The median income for a household in the CDP was $22,500, and the median income for a family was $51,250. Males had a median income of $51,250 versus $0 for females. The per capita income for the CDP was $17,355. There were no families and 16.1% of the population living below the poverty line, none of whom were aged under 18 or over 64.
