= Charcoal Island, Alaska =

Island in Alaska

Charcoal Island is an island in Sitka, Alaska. It was discovered and named in 1809 by Russian navigator Ivan Vasiliev. On the island, there is Sikta Rocky Gutierrez Airport, Mt. Edgecrumbe High School, and Mt. Edgecrumbe Hospital. It is located at 57°2′47″N 135°21′3″W.
