= Koyuk River =

Koyuk River Kuyuk
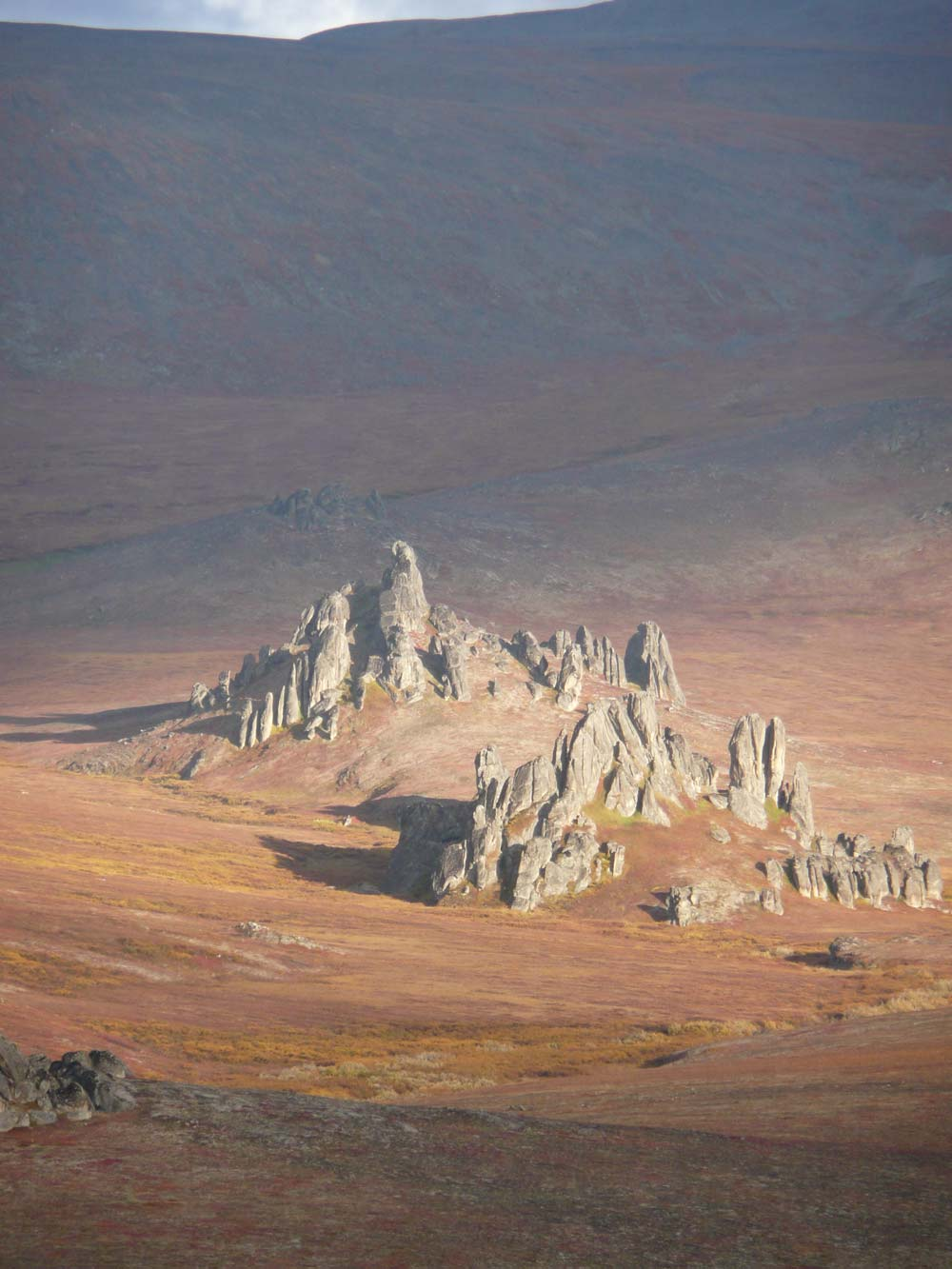
- Part of the Bering Land Bridge National Preserve, in the Koyuk River Valley

- Location of the mouth of the Koyuk River in Alaska
- Native name: Kuuyuk (Inuit)

Location
- Country: United States
- State: Alaska
- District: Nome Census Area

Physical characteristics
- Source: small lake 3 miles (4.8 km) north of Kuzitrin Lake
  - location: Bering Land Bridge National Preserve, Seward Peninsula
  - coordinates: 65°25′44″N 163°13′00″W
  - elevation: 1,526 ft (465 m)
- Mouth: Norton Bay
  - location: Koyuk
  - coordinates: 64°55′45″N 161°08′03″W
  - elevation: 0 ft (0 m)
- Length: 115 mi (185 km)

The Koyuk River (also spelled, Kuyuk) (Inupiaq: Kuuyuk; Yup'ik: Kuiguk) is a river on the Seward Peninsula of western Alaska, in the United States. The river originates in the interior of the peninsula, at the Lost Jim Lava Flow of the Bering Land Bridge National Preserve, where it flows southeast towards the mouth of Norton Bay on Norton Sound. The native village of Koyuk is located at its mouth. The two major tributaries are the Peace and Salmon rivers; other tributaries include Dime and Sweepstakes.

== Etymology ==
Its Inuit named as Tebenkof Eskimos, reported by Captain Tebenkov (1852, map 2), IRN, as Kvyguk or Kvieguk. The Western Union Telegraph Expedition spelled the name Koikpak ("big river"). The Seward map of 1867 gives Koipak, and later as Kayuk, Koyuk, and Kuyuk. The Kanguksuk is also known as the Left Fork of the Kviguk (Koyuk). The present spelling comes from Alfred Hulse Brooks', 1900 United States Geological Survey.

== Geography ==
The Koyuk River, one of the largest in the Seward Peninsula, originates in a lake (no designated name) bounded on the north by the Bendeleben Mountains, in the upper reaches of the Bering Land Bridge National Preserve, in Northwest Alaska. The upper reach is also reported as being made up of flat lava fields to the north of the mountains.

The 115-mile (185 km) long river flows southeast for 90 miles (140 km), then south for another 25 miles (40 km). The river empties into Norton Bay, which it enters via a tidal estuary downstream of the river's confluence with the East Fork Koyuk River near the village of Koyuk. The last stretch of the river, is in a southeasterly direction as it joins the bay, and flows through the tundra wetland area. The catchment in the middle and upper reaches has a horse-shoe shape, and the hills surrounding the valley lie in an elevation range of 2,000 to 3,000 feet (610 to 910 m); the two prominent mountains are the Bendeleben Mountains and Domes of Granite Mountain, the latter named after the granite geological formations.

In its initial reaches, the river has steep slopes with rapids in the upper most reaches having shallow depth of flows. The river widens as it flows down with more flow additions from tributaries which join it and the width of the river attains 820 feet (250 m), with a slow moving stretch of the river recording a 5-foot (1.5 m) depth of water. On both banks of the river rock exposures derived lava flows are bedded on a horizontal direction; the rockfall from these exposures has filled the river bed with boulders. While the lava beds were noted in the upper region of the river and also in the valley, geological formations in the valley were mapped by Walter Curran Mendenhall, the fifth director of the US Geological Survey. He reported these formations as basalts of Pleistocene or Late Pleistocene age. Gold, platinum, and radioactive minerals were reported by the U.S. Bureau of Mines in 1973, as well as lode and placer claims, along a 10-mile (16 km) wide stretch of the river.

Basin

The river becomes a broad estuary subject to tidal effect extending for long stretch upstream forming a flat mud- and sand-filled basin. The basin area measure approximately 2,000 square miles (5,200 km^{2}). The Bering Land Bridge National Preserve is in the uppermost part of the basin. Its drainage includes southeastern Seward Peninsula through Norton Bay.

== History ==
A study of the archaeological remains at the Lyatayak site, south of Cape Denbigh and south of Koyuk, indicated that the area was inhabited 6000 to 8000 years ago. The recorded history of Koyuk is traced to Lieutenant L.A. Zagoskin of the Imperial Russian Navy during the 1840s. In 1865, William Wennis of the Western Union Telegraph expedition reported that the Koyuk was deserted on account of possibly the smallpox epidemic wiping out the entire population of the village and that the village had been abandoned for 13 years. The Yupik-speaking Unali Eskimos and the Melemute Eskimos resettled in Koyuk during the 1860s to take advantage of caribou herding. In 1879, a trading post for furs was established at the river's mouth by the Alaska Commercial Company. During the gold rush, there was intense activity in the region but hardly any gold was found though claims had been staked at many places within the Koyuk River valley. By 1900, the village had declined to the level of subsistence economy, depending on fishing and hunting caribou and moose and picking on berries.

== Wildlife ==
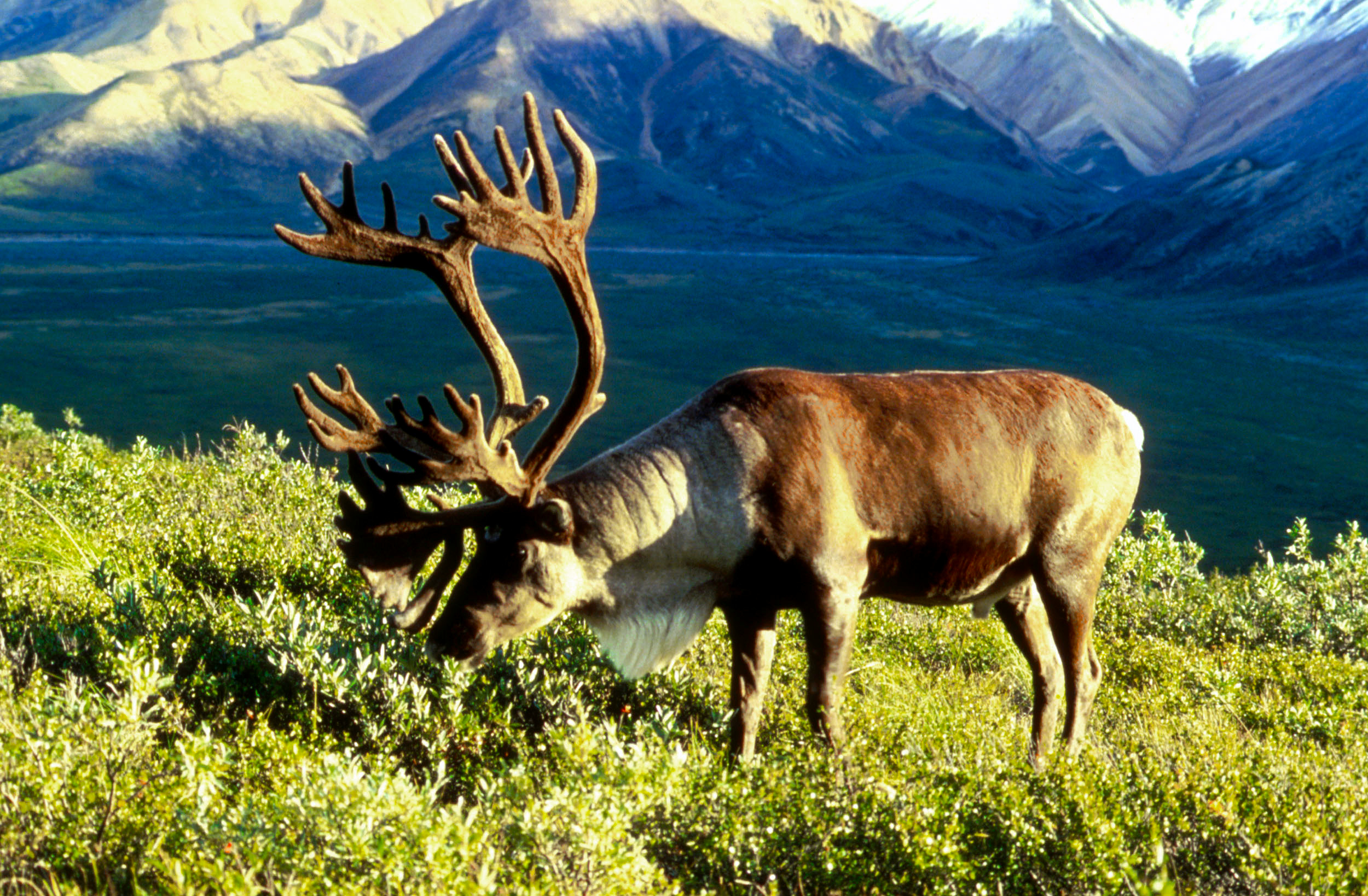
Caribou reindeer

Under the Alaska National Interest Lands Conservation Act (ANILCA) (P.L 96-487) the Koyuk River is categorized as "Freshwater Aquatic Herbaceous" and is one out of 25 nominated as the National Wild and Scenic Rivers. The river and the basin draining it is rich of wild life species, which consists of five fish species, 22 mammals species and 46 bird species.

The flora of the river watershed, in their descending order of distribution are: closed needleleaf forest dominating the riparian zone; closed tall shrub scrub is also part of the riparian zone, and open-air low shrub scrub with willows and grasses as dominant vegetation. The wet graminoid herbaceous habitat lies between the river riparian and higher ground. The mesic graminoid herbaceous forms the hilly tussock tundra. The dominant vegetation in the valley is of tundras, except in the basin area below Knowles Creek, where it consists of tree species of willows, spruce and birch.

The river is well known for its fishing resources. the fish species reported are Chinook salmon (Oncorhynchus tshawytscha), sockeye salmon (Oncorhynchus nerka), coho salmon (Oncorhynchus kisutch), steelhead/rainbow trout (Oncorhynchus mykiss), Dolly Varden trout (Salvelinus malma), northern pike (Esox lucius), grayling (Thymallus thymallus), Dolly Varden trout (Salvelinus malma malma), and Arctic char (Salvelinus alpinus). Some of the important mammals reported in the river basin are moose (Alces alces), grizzly bear (Ursus arctos horribilis), black bear (Ursus americanus), caribou (Rangifer tarandus), wolves (Canis lupus), lynx, red fox, beaver, and snowshoe hare (Lepus americanus). Some of the important bird species reported in the river watershed are: bald eagles, glaucous gulls, spruce grouse, northern flying squirrel, song birds, ravens, waterfowl, lesser golden-plover, whimbrel and Lapland longspur.

== Tourism ==
There are a network of trails in the basin, prominent among these are the Koyuk River-Buckland route and the Koyuk-Kiwalik route. The river is also popular for water sports such as kayaking and rafting.

== See also ==
- List of rivers of Alaska
