= Bering Land Bridge National Preserve =

Protected area in Alaska, United States

- IUCN category V (protected landscape/seascape)
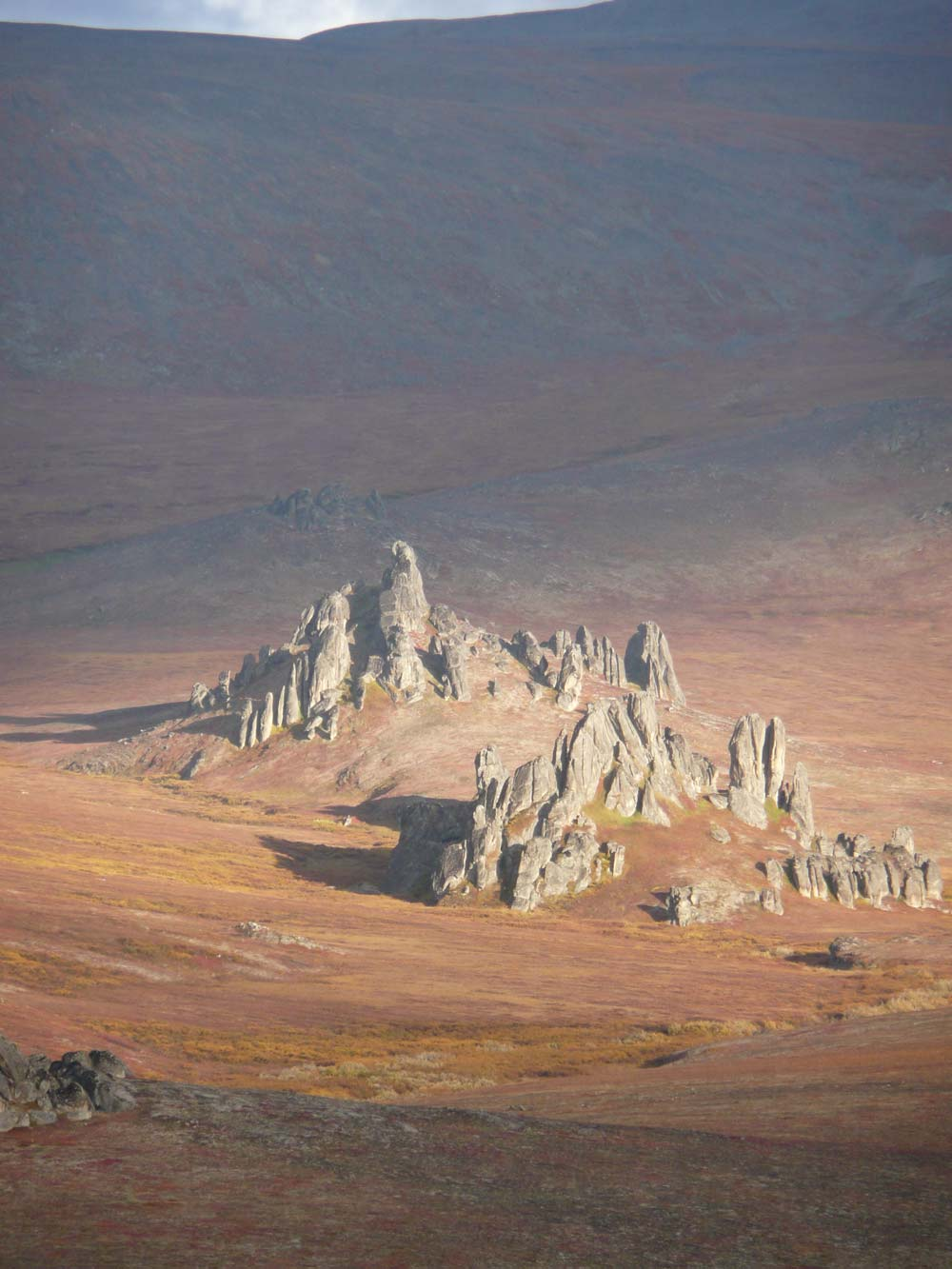
- Serpentine Tors

- Location within Alaska
- Location: Seward Peninsula, Alaska, United States
- Nearest city: Kotzebue, Alaska
- Coordinates: 65°50′N 164°10′W
- Area: 2,697,391 acres (10,915.95 km^{2})
- Created: 1 December 1978
- Visitors: 2,674 (in 2025)
- Governing body: National Park Service
- Website: Bering Land Bridge National Preserve

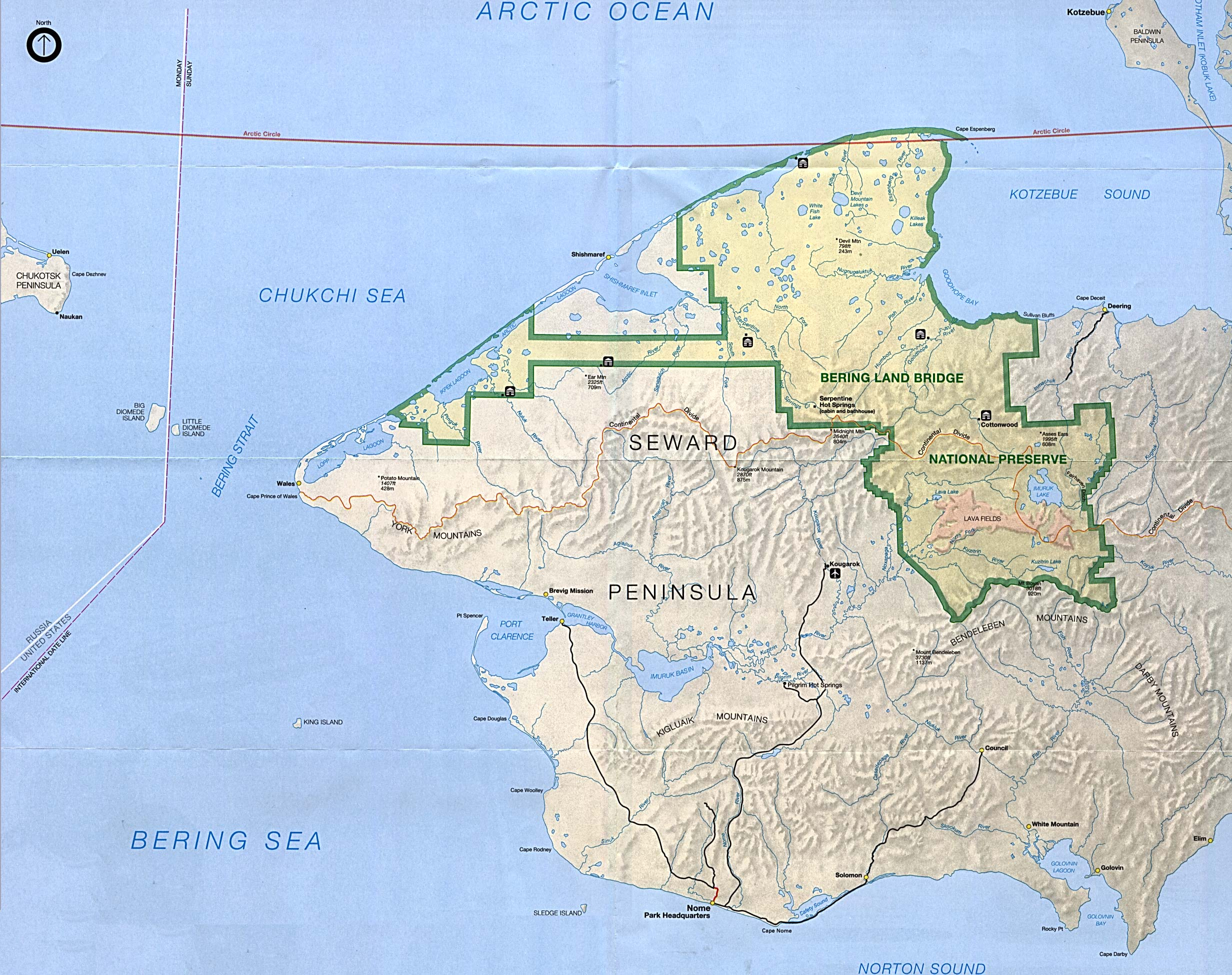
Map of Bering Land Bridge National Preserve

The Bering Land Bridge National Preserve is one of the most remote protected areas of the United States, located on the Seward Peninsula. The National Preserve protects a remnant of the Bering Land Bridge that connected Asia with North America more than 13,000 years ago during the Pleistocene ice age. The majority of this land bridge now lies beneath the waters of the Chukchi and Bering Seas. During the glacial epoch this bridge was a migration route for people, animals, and plants whenever ocean levels fell enough to expose the land bridge. Archeologists debate whether it was across this Bering Land Bridge, also called Beringia, that humans first migrated from Asia to populate the Americas, or whether it was via a coastal route.

Bering Land Bridge National Monument was established in 1978 by Presidential proclamation under the authority of the Antiquities Act. The designation was modified in 1980 to a national preserve with the passage of the Alaska National Interest Lands Conservation Act (ANILCA), which would allow both subsistence hunting by local residents and sport hunting. The preserve includes significant archaeological sites and a variety of geological features. The preserve has seen recent volcanic activity, with lava flows and lake-filled maars. Hot springs are a popular destination for tourists.

== Geography ==
The preserve lies on the northern side of the Seward Peninsula, with 2,697,391 acres (1,091,595 ha). The preserve extends along the coast from a point to the west of Deering along Goodhope Bay to Cape Espenberg, then westward along the shore of the Chukchi Sea. The boundary moves inland to avoid the village of Shishmaref and the Shishmaref Inlet, then rejoins the coast to include Ikpek Lagoon. A narrow corridor connects the Ikpek Lagoon section to the main preserve. The interior portions extend to and across the Continental Divide as far as the Bendeleben Mountains. The region around the continental divide includes volcanic areas such as Serpentine Hot Springs and lava fields between the Noxapaga River and the Kuzitrin River. The preserve's high point is Mount Boyan on the south border.

There are no roads into the preserve. Access to the preserve is by bush planes or boats during summer months and by ski planes, snowmobiles or dog sleds during the winter. Bering Land Bridge National Preserve contains several sites of geological and prehistorical significance. Serpentine Hot Springs is the preserve's most visited location. Other notable locations in the preserve include the Trail Creek Caves, Devil Mountain Lakes, and the Lost Jim Lava Flow.

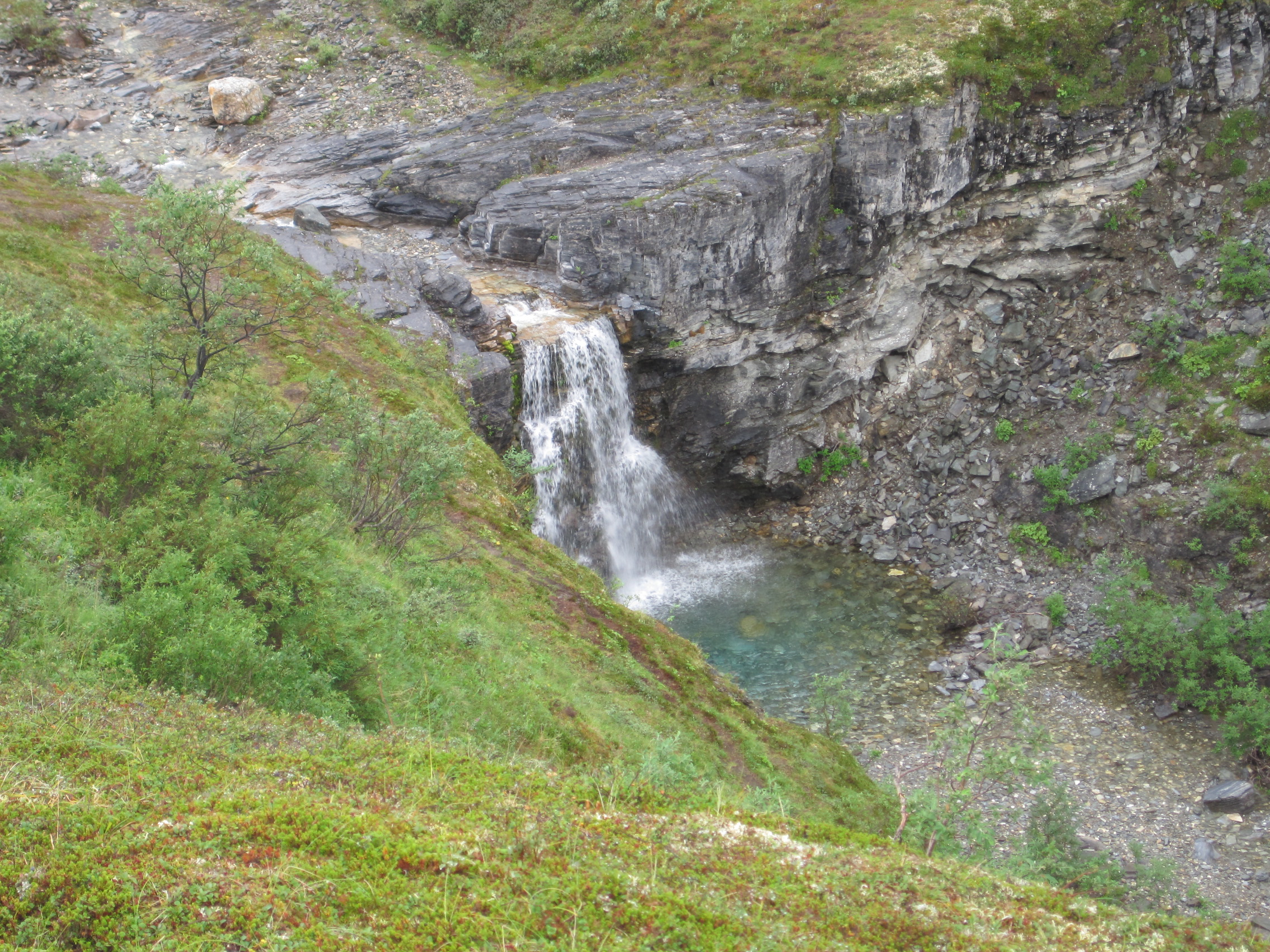
Dorothy Falls

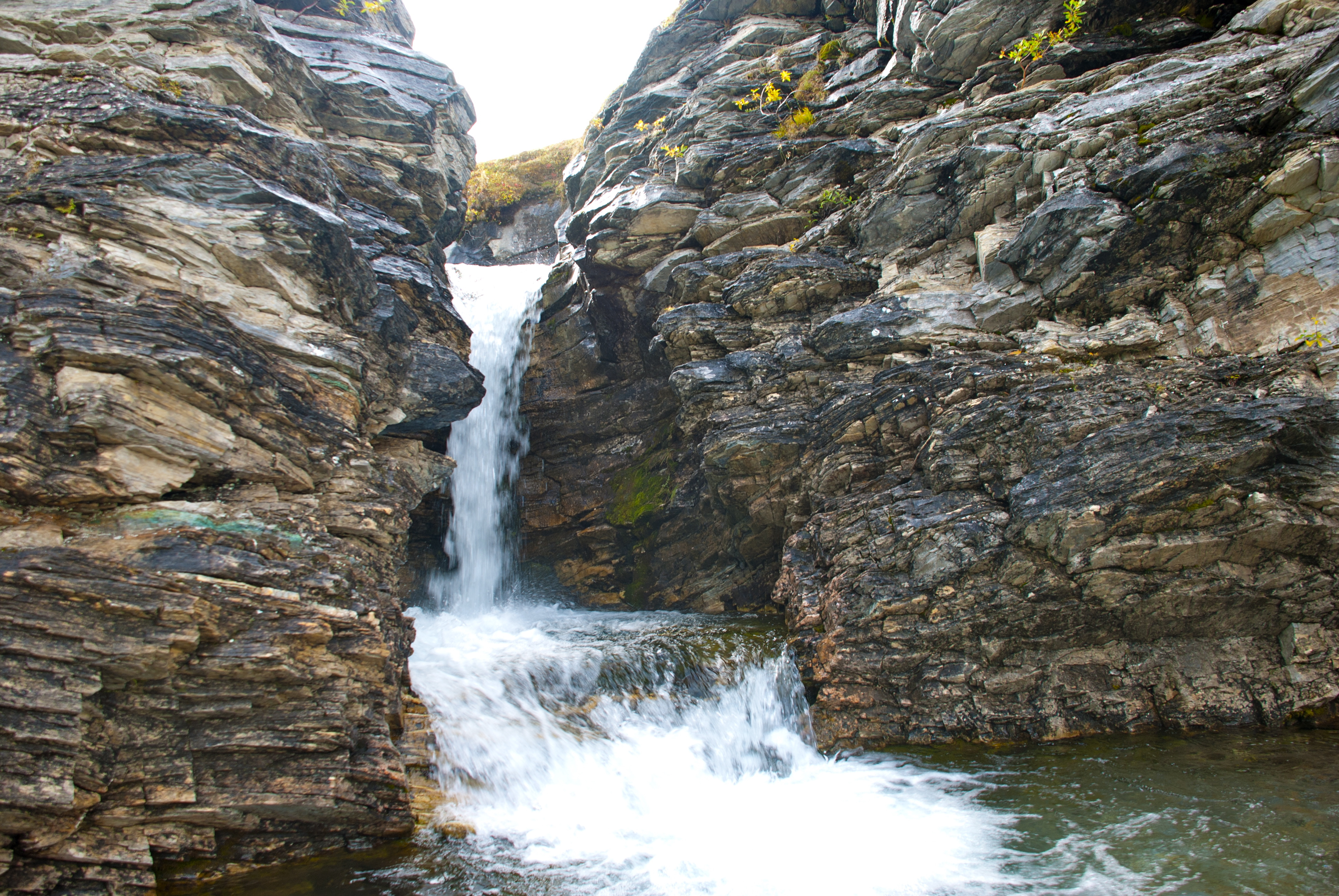
Copper Canyon

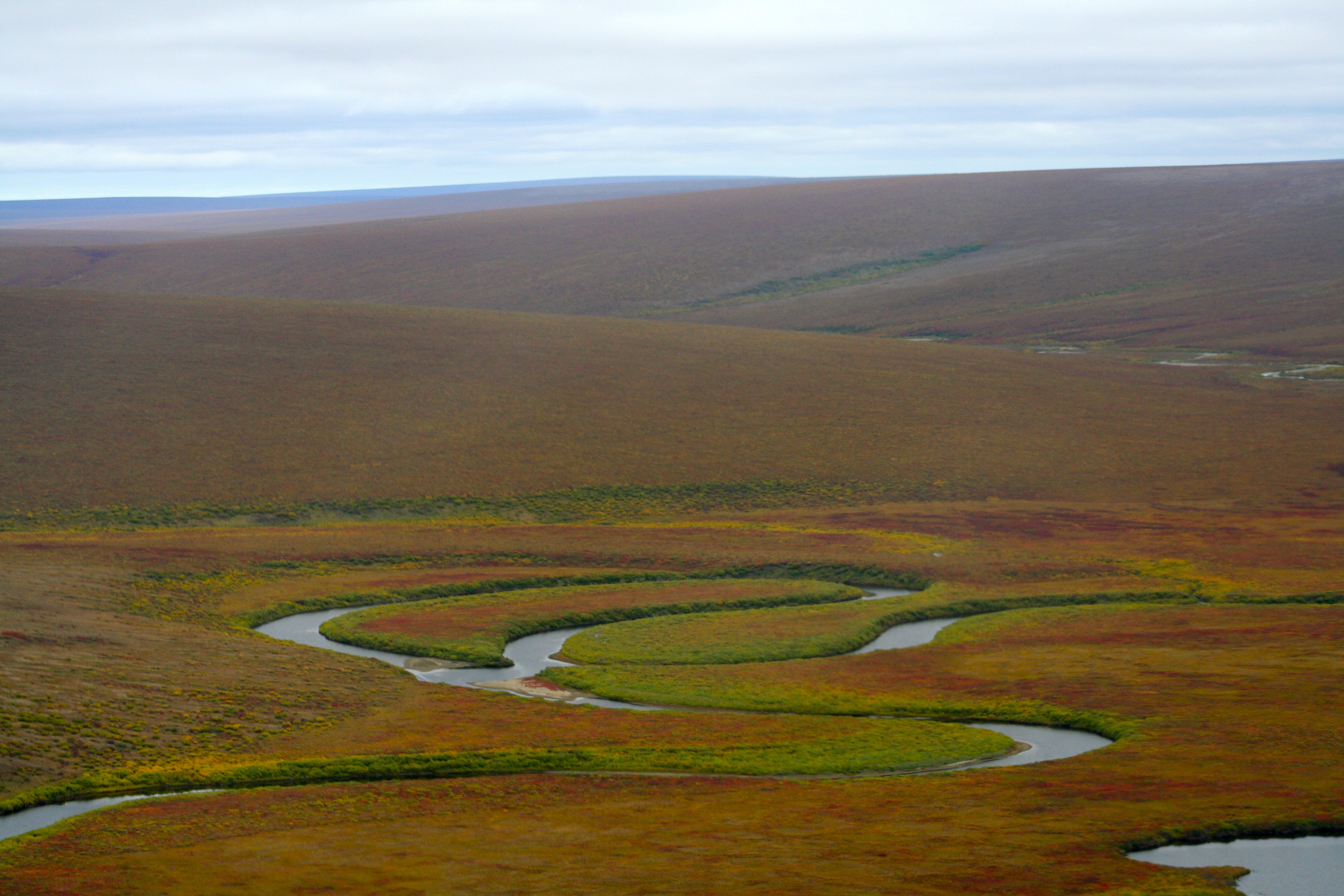
Cottonwood

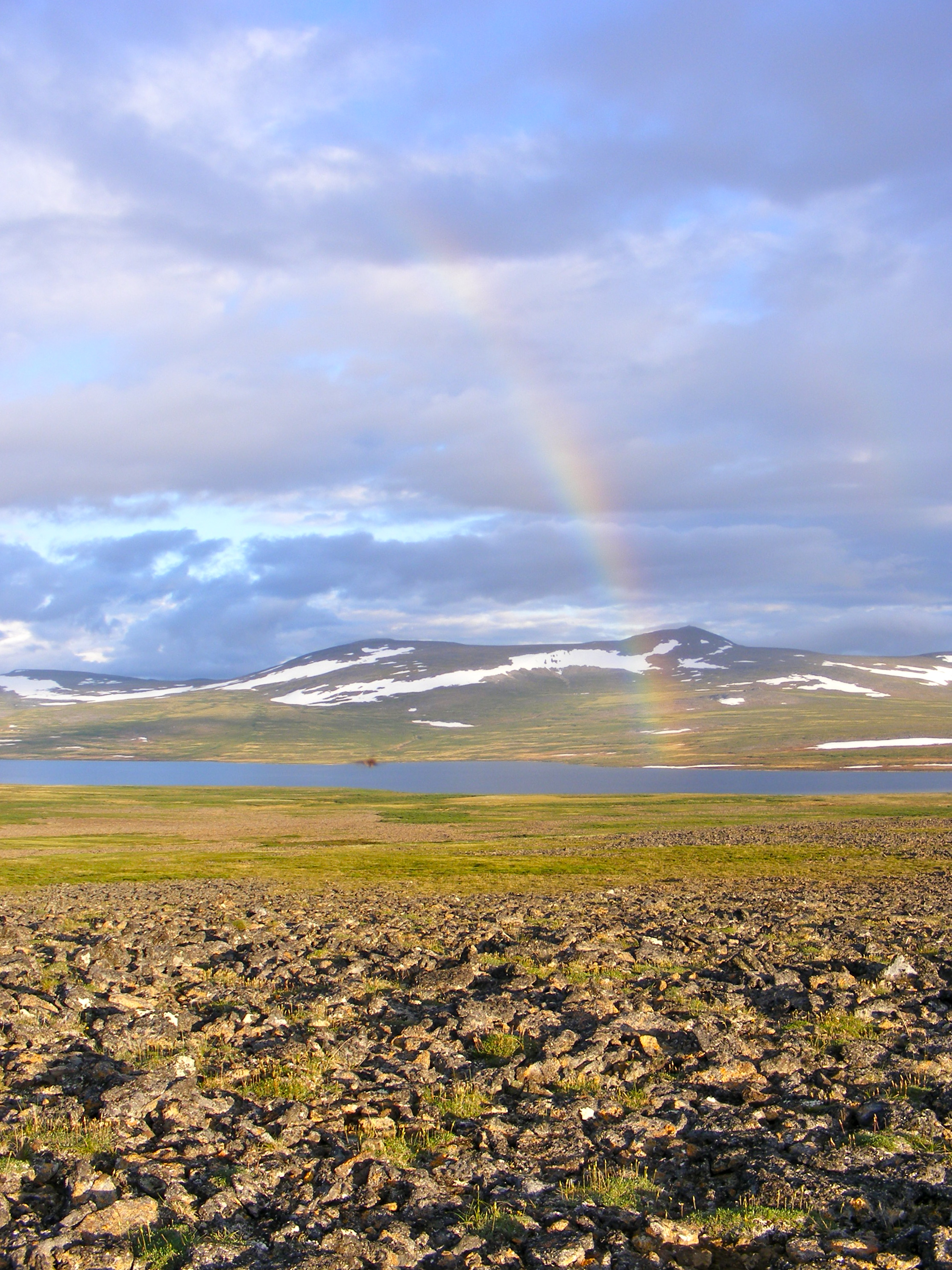
Kuzitrin Lake

=== Volcanism and geology ===
The Seward Peninsula is a remnant of the Beringia subcontinent that linked Alaska and Siberia during periods of low sea levels during ice ages. The region was mostly untouched by glaciers during the ice age. The preserve lands can be described by five physiographic zones: the northern coastal plan, the rolling stream-dissected uplands, the Imuruk lava plateau, the Kuzitrin flats, and the Bendeleben Mountains.

The Seward Peninsula is primarily composed of metamorphic blueschist, with deposits of sand, gravel, silt, loess and a few glacier-deposited moraines. The area around Cape Espenberg includes a series of relict beach ridges like those found farther north at Cape Krusenstern. These deposits are found mainly in the coastal plain, where they form a system of lagoons and barrier bars or spits. The rolling uplands lie inland and to the south of the coastal plain. The Serpentine Hot Springs and Trail Creek Caves are in this region of limestone, marble and other minerals.

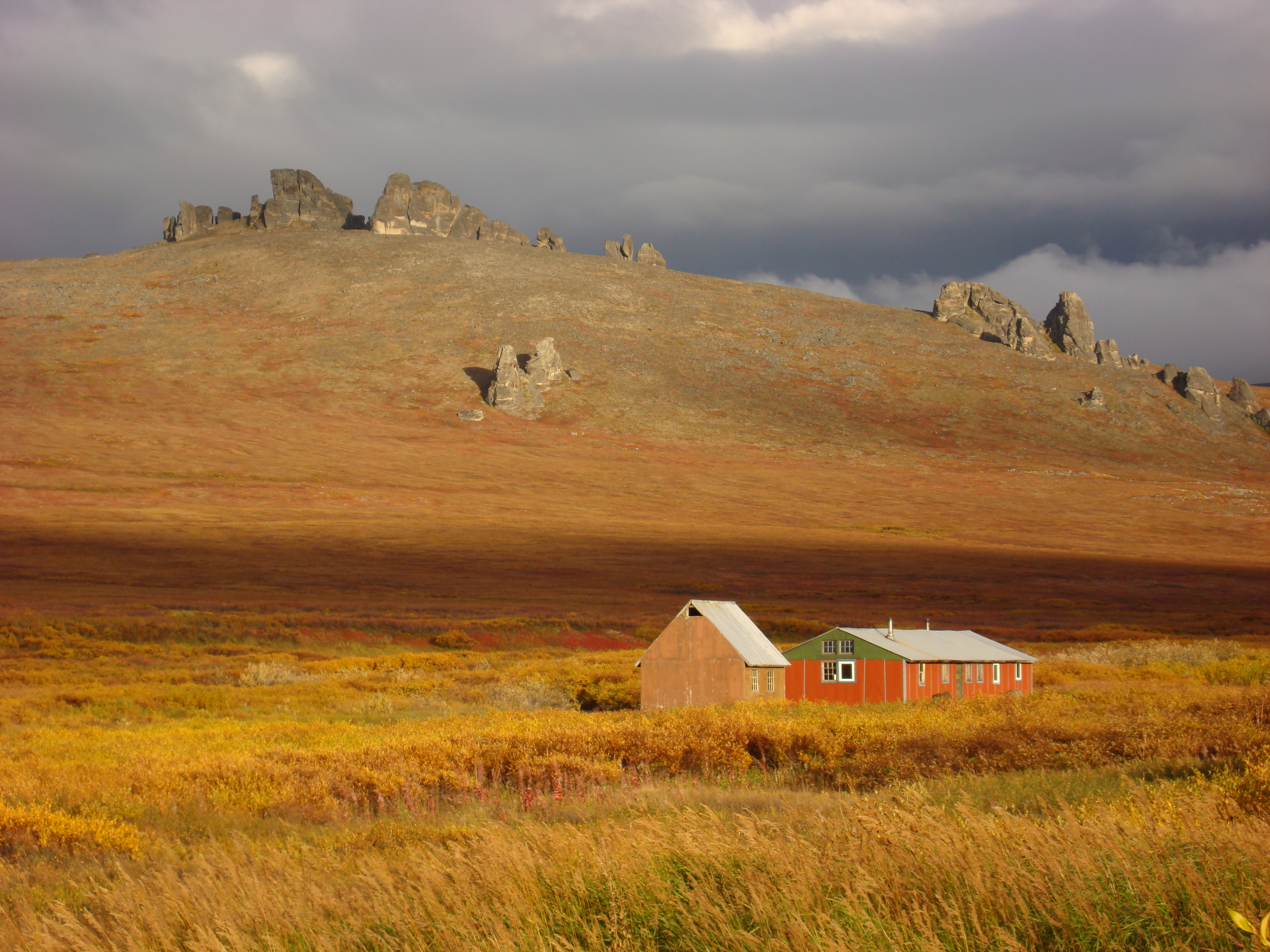
The tors and bunkhouse at Serpentine Hot Springs

Volcanic activity in the interior has left areas of basalt on the Imuruk lava plateau. The volcanic activity has been recent: the Lost Jim lava flow is estimated to be only 1,000 to 2,000 years old, produced from around 75 vents. The largest vent is the Lost Jim Cone, about 75 feet (23 m) high. One remnant of volcanism is the presence of hot springs. The Serpentine Hot Springs produce water at a temperature of 140 °F (60 °C) to 170 °F (77 °C), and have been used for millennia by local people. Granite tors are another volcanic remnant, formed underground and exposed by erosion. Bering Land Bridge has the four largest and northernmost maar lakes in the world at Espenberg, formed by phreatomagmatic eruptions leaving round craters. The ages of the lakes range from 100,000–200,000 years at Whitefish Maar, to 50,000 years at North Killeak Maar, 40,000 years at South Killeak Maar, and 17,500 years at Devil Mountain Maar.

The action of ice and permafrost produces features such as polygonal ice wedges and pingos.

=== Serpentine Hot Springs ===
Serpentine Hot Springs, (Inupiaq: Iyat or Uunaatuq), previously known as Arctic Hot Springs, is located in the Bering Land Bridge National Preserve. The springs are also referred to as Iyat, the Inupiaq word for cooking pot. Serpentine Hot Springs is on the northern part of the Seward Peninsula at 65°51′N, 164°43′W. The springs are situated on the right bank of Hot Springs Creek which flows to the Serpentine River, 47 miles NW of Imuruk Lake.

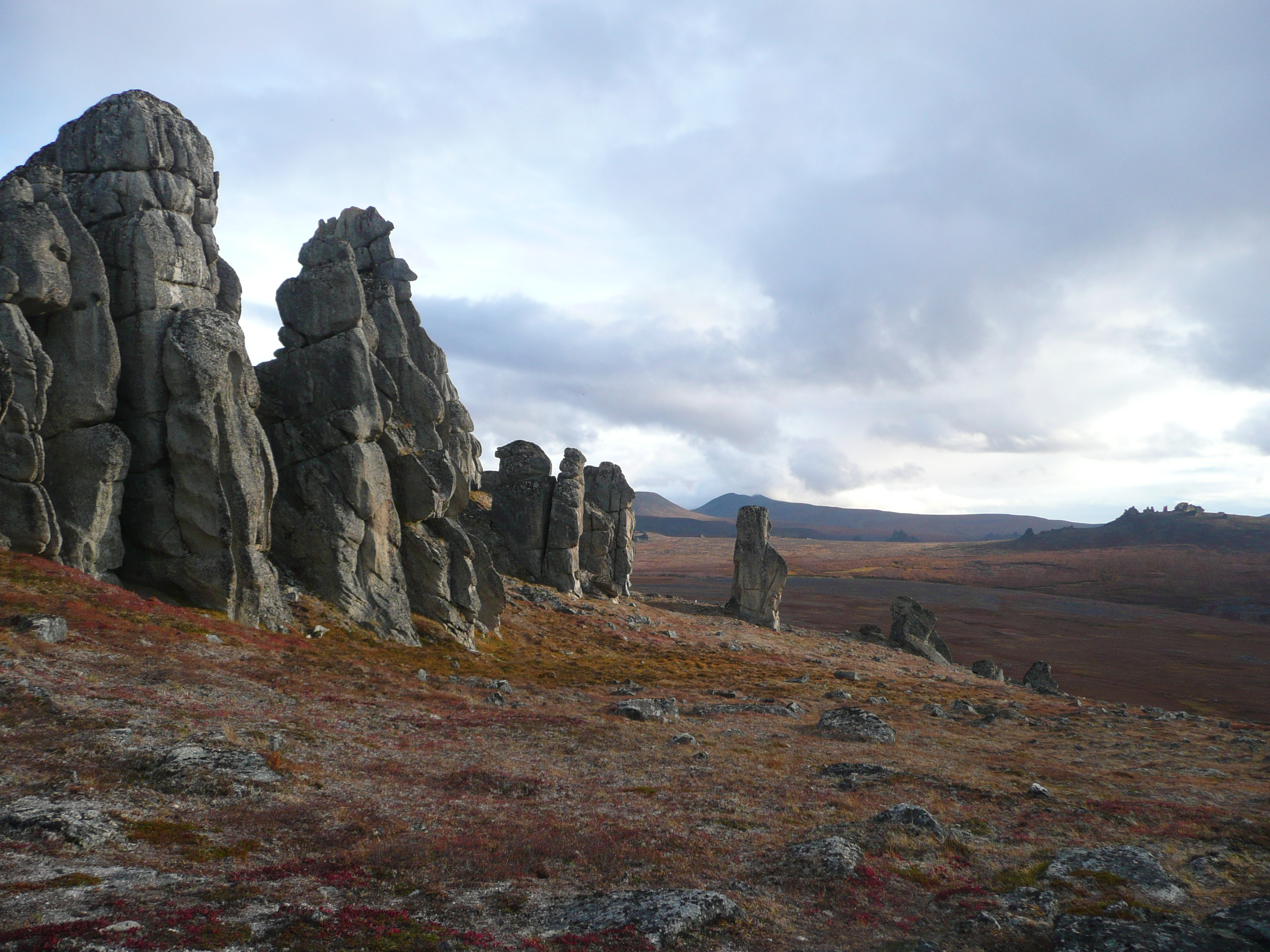
Serpentine rocks

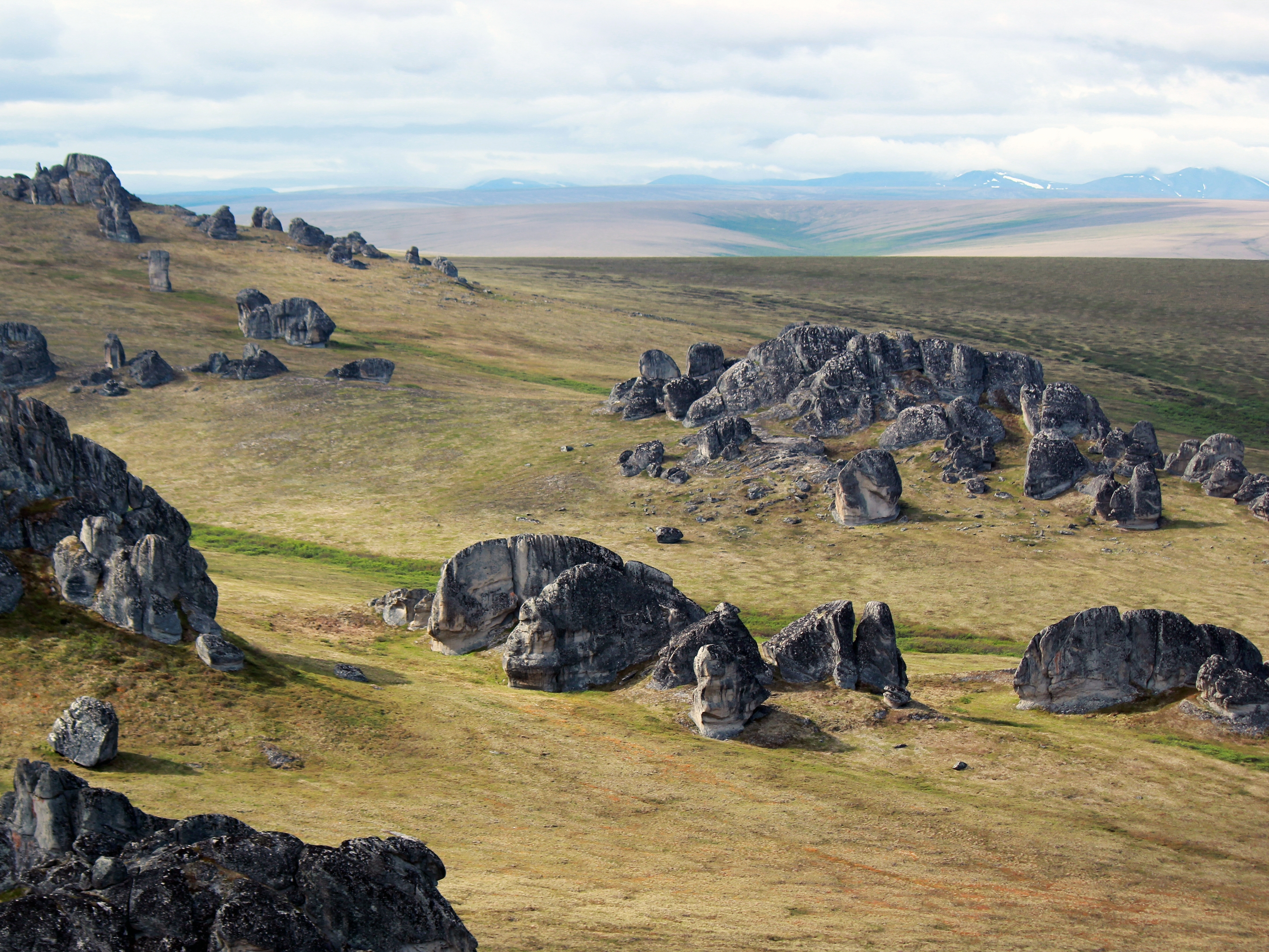
Serpentine Tors

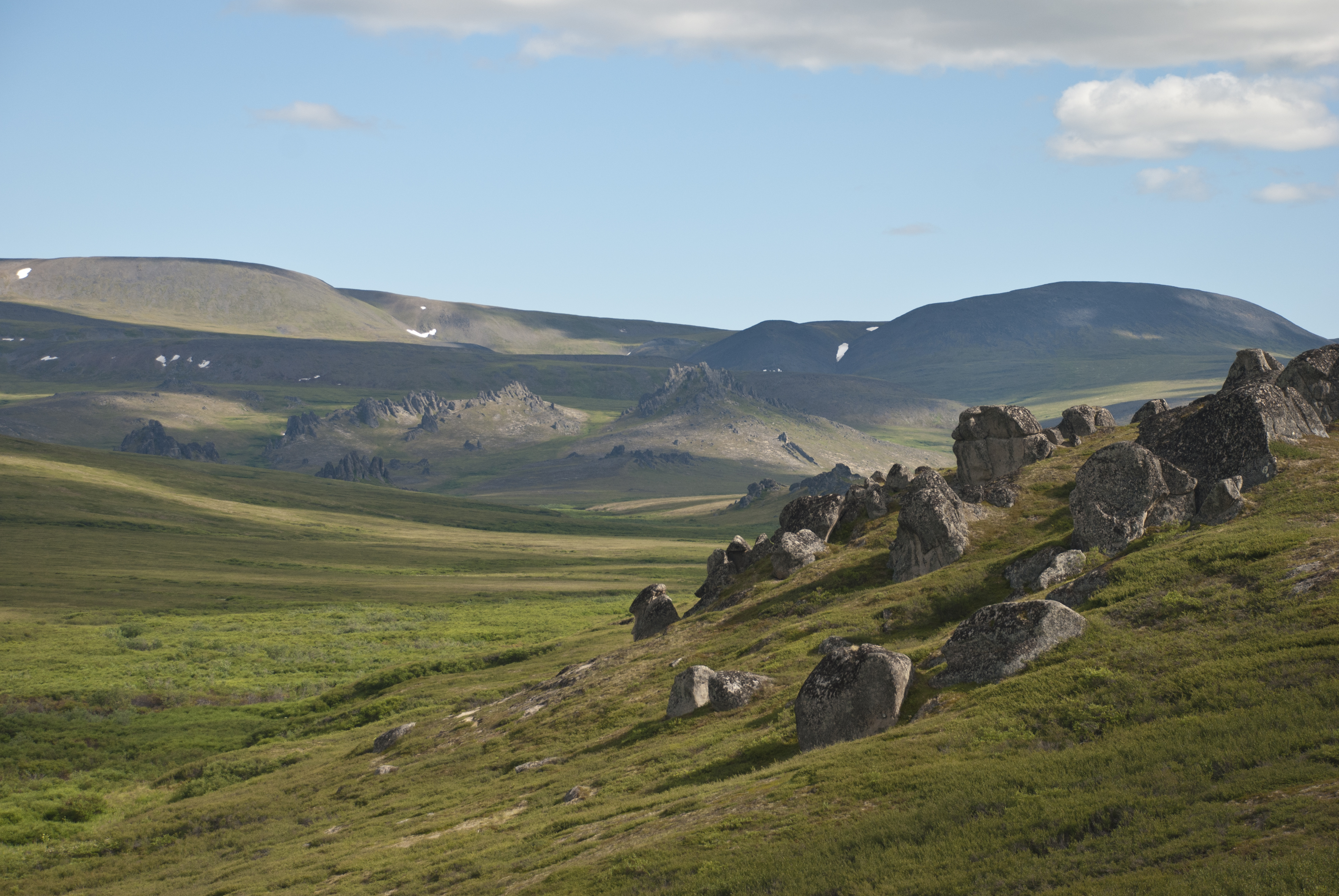
Serpentine Tors

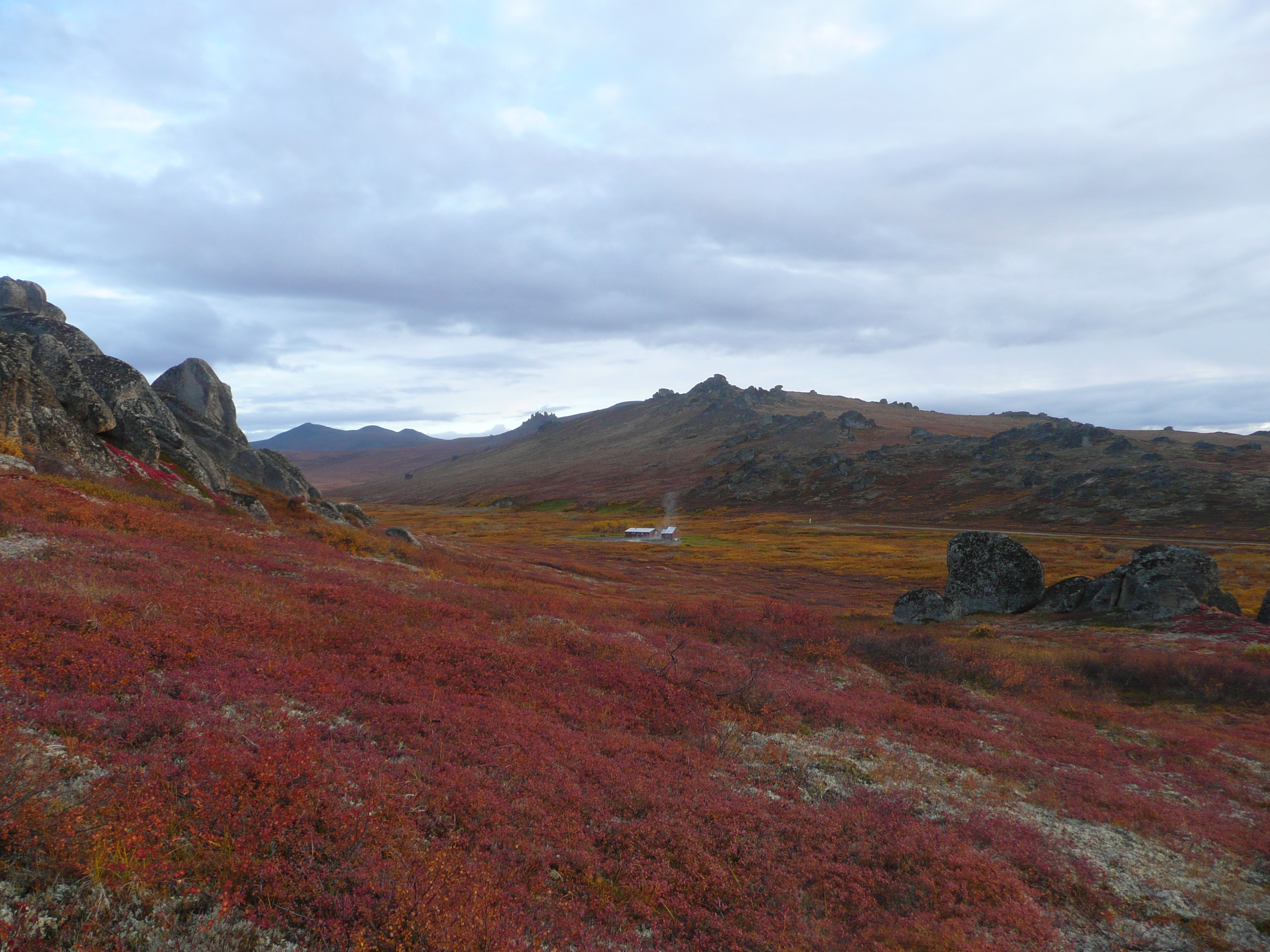
Serpentine Falls

== History ==
Serpentine Hot Springs was originally described by Arthur J. Collier in U.S. Geological Survey Bulletin (1902). Collier noted that Charles McLennan, who with a dog team and Inupiat assistants, was probably the first white man to reach the hot springs in May, 1900. McLennan may have staked a mining claim nearby but left the country by September, 1901. Another miner, John Sirene, built a cabin and maintained a garden at the springs. Miners used the area intermittently until around 1915, when prospectors built a cabin, bathhouse, and a bathing pool that was 10 to 12 feet in diameter nearby. A runway may have been constructed in 1923 and a bunkhouse was dragged in by Alaska Road Commission workers in 1949. In 1953, the nearby village of Shishmaref received $53,000 in state funds to construct a public bath house.

It is possible that the springs were used traditionally by Inupiat residents for cooking, for healing and spiritual purposes. Anthropologists who studied the Inupiat in the area reported local beliefs that the healing influences at the hot springs site was very strong.

== Ecology ==
Most of the land in the preserve is tundra, underlain by permafrost. The tundra supports a variety of low and slow-growing plants. The landscape is dominated by grasses and sedges, such as cottongrass. Large trees cannot survive on the tundra. Tree species are limited to dwarf species like Arctic willow, Alaska willow and dwarf birch. Berry-bearing plants in the preserve include bog blueberry, crowberry, low-bush cranberry and cloudberry or salmonberry. Lichens are found in rocky areas, including Cetraria, Cladina, Cladonia, Xanthoria and Umbilicaria genera. Mosses and liverworts in the preserve include Sphagnum peat mosses, Aulacomnium bog mosses, Dicranum forked mosses, Polytrichum haircap mosses and Rhizomnium. In spring the preserve features a variety of wildflowers, including Alpine Arnica, fireweed, Kamchatka rhododendron, Labrador tea, monkshood, one-flowered cinquefoil, harebell and alpine forget-me-not.

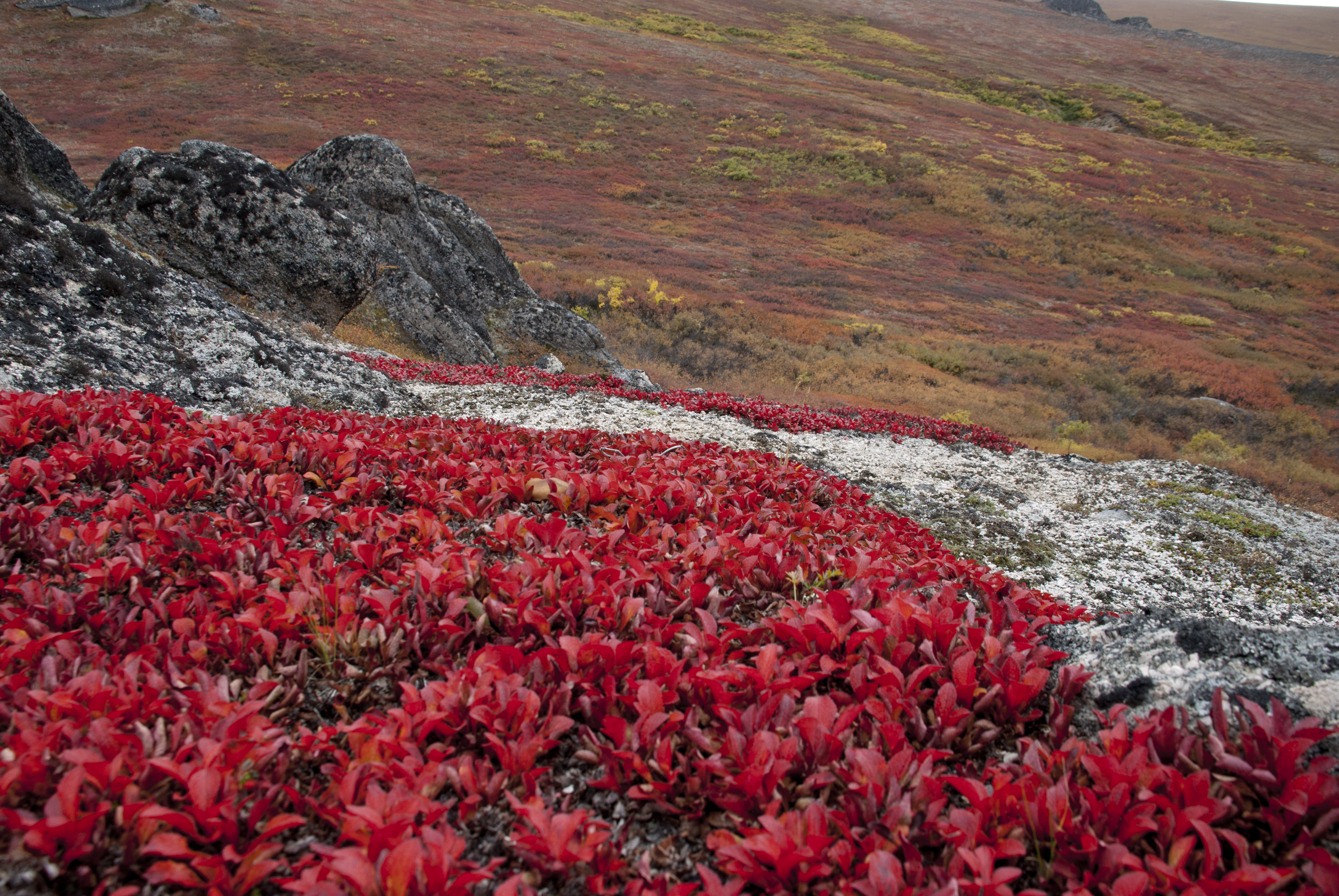
Arctostaphylos uva-ursi

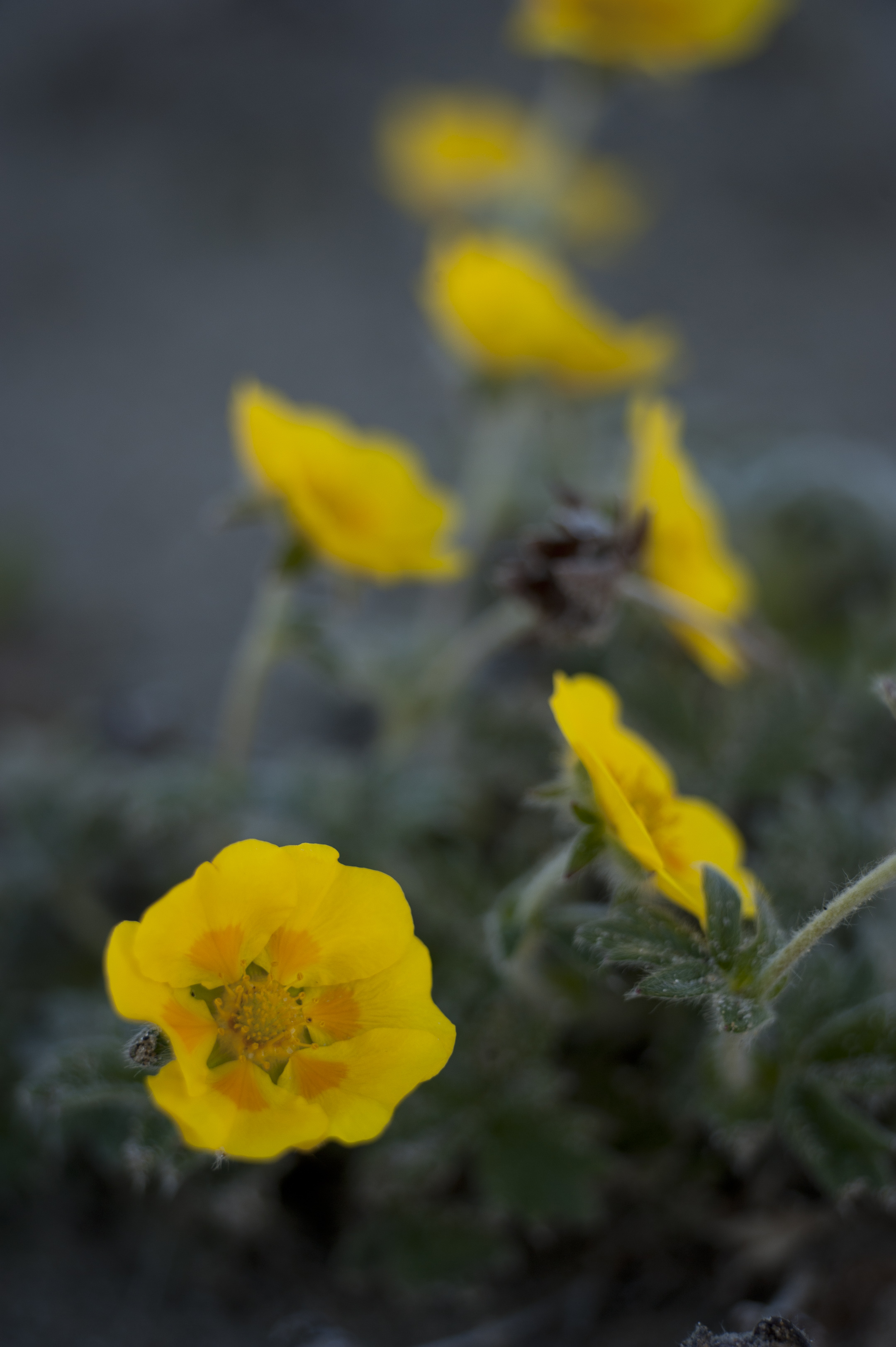
Potentilla uniflora

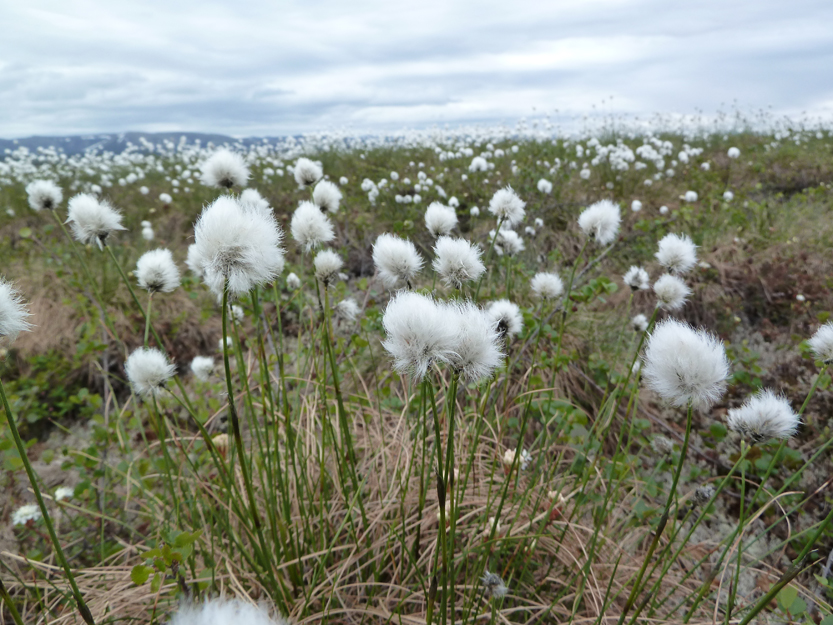
Eriophorum angustifolium

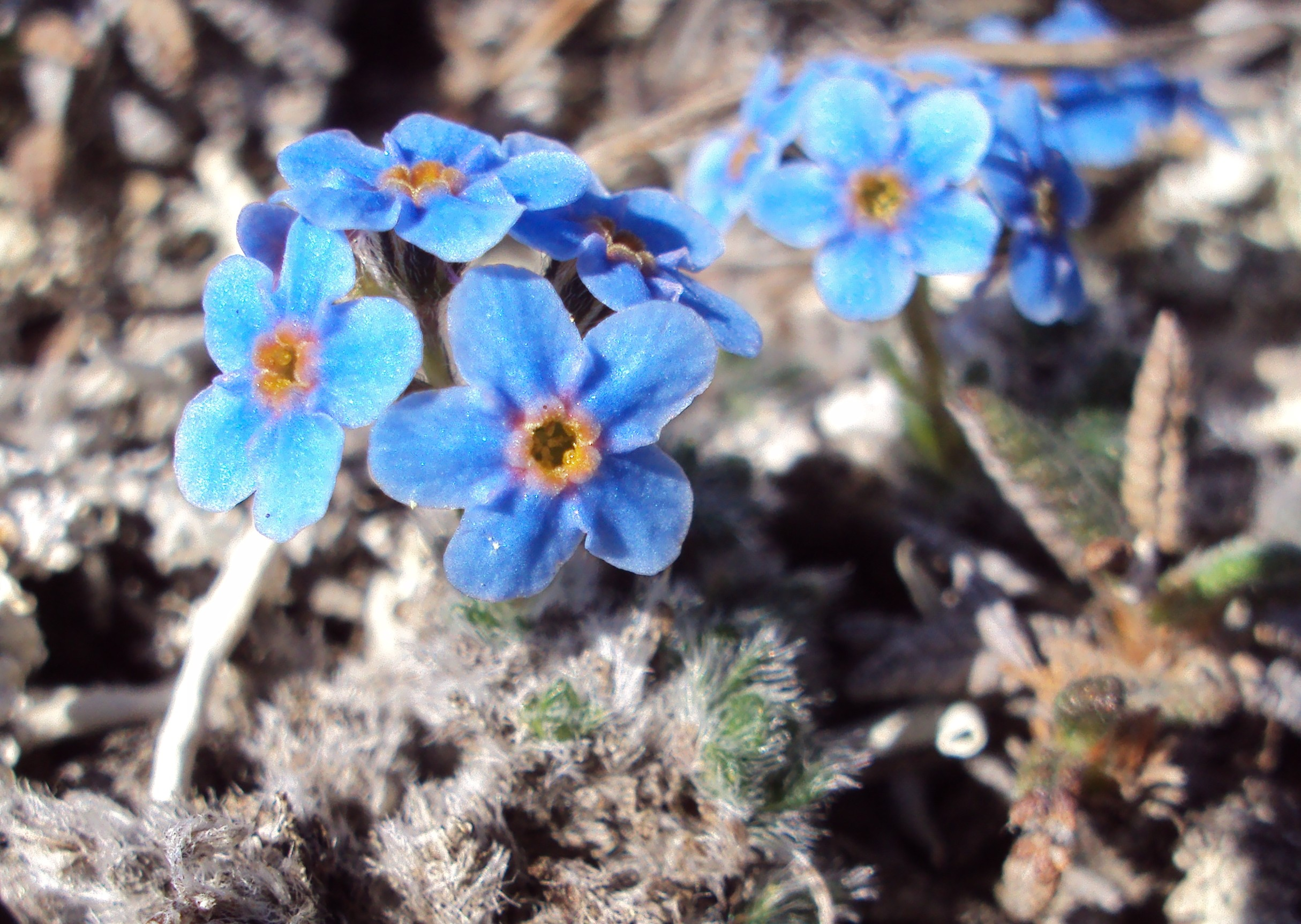
Eritrichium nanum

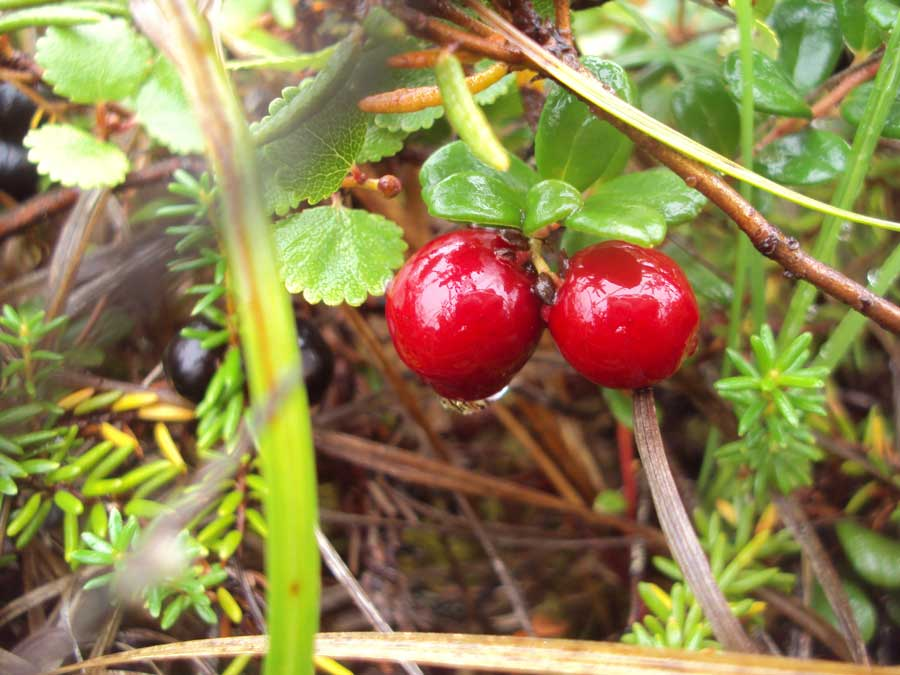
Vaccinium oxycoccos

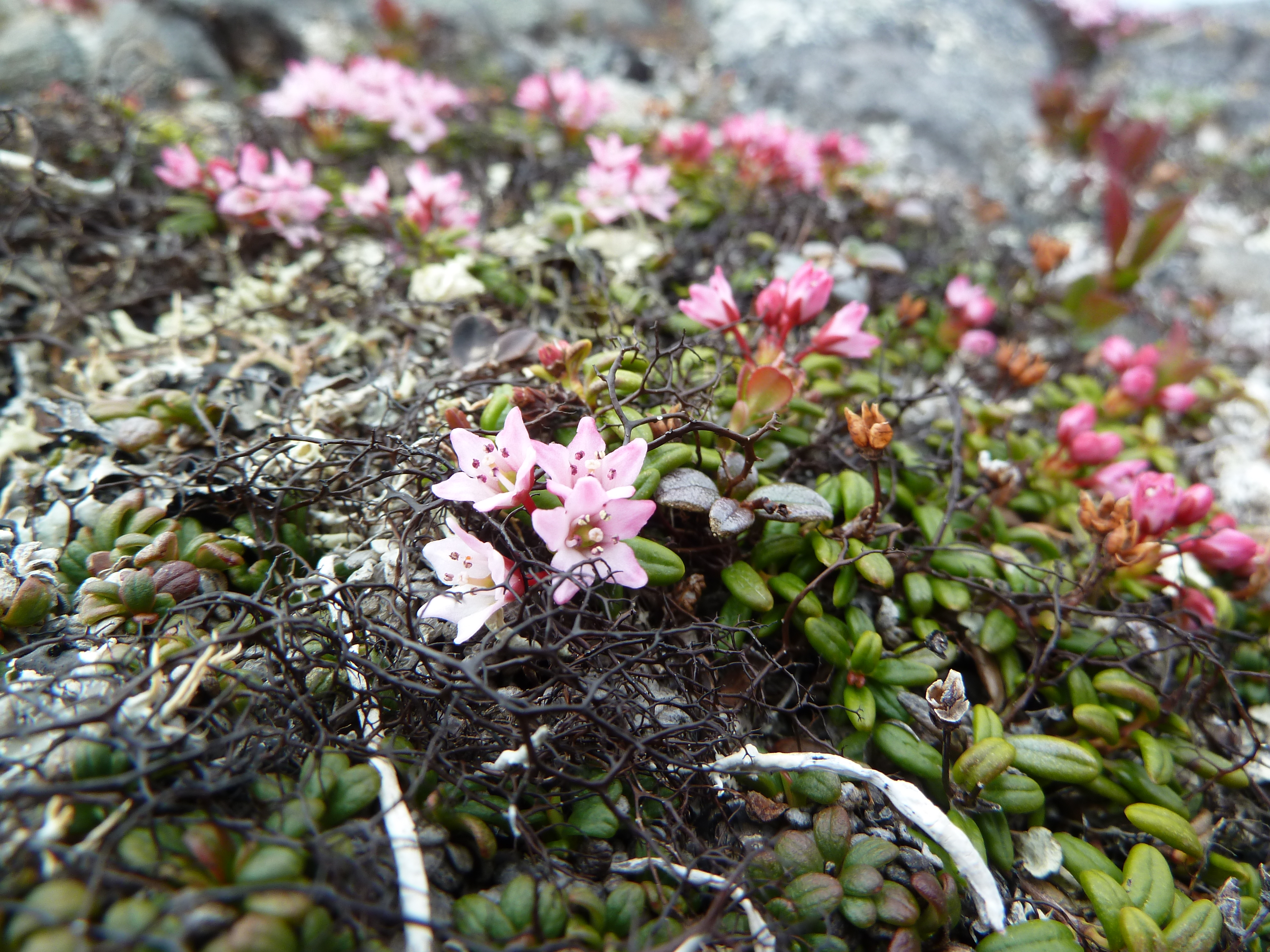
Kalmia procumbens

Caribou are survivors of the ice age environment in the preserve, together with reintroduced muskoxen. The muskoxen were reintroduced to the area in 1970, after being wiped out in the early 20th century. In addition to the native caribou, Siberian tundra reindeer (Rangifer tarandus sibiricus) were introduced in 1894, reaching a peak population of 600,000 animals in the 1930s. The herd has since been reduced to about 4,000. The Reindeer Act of 1937 prohibited ownership by non-Native Americans, and the reduced herds were managed by natives from that time onward. Other mammals in the preserve are walruses, polar bears, red foxes, brown bears, Arctic foxes, ribbon seals, wolverines and beavers. Significant nesting bird species include sandhill cranes and yellow-billed loons.

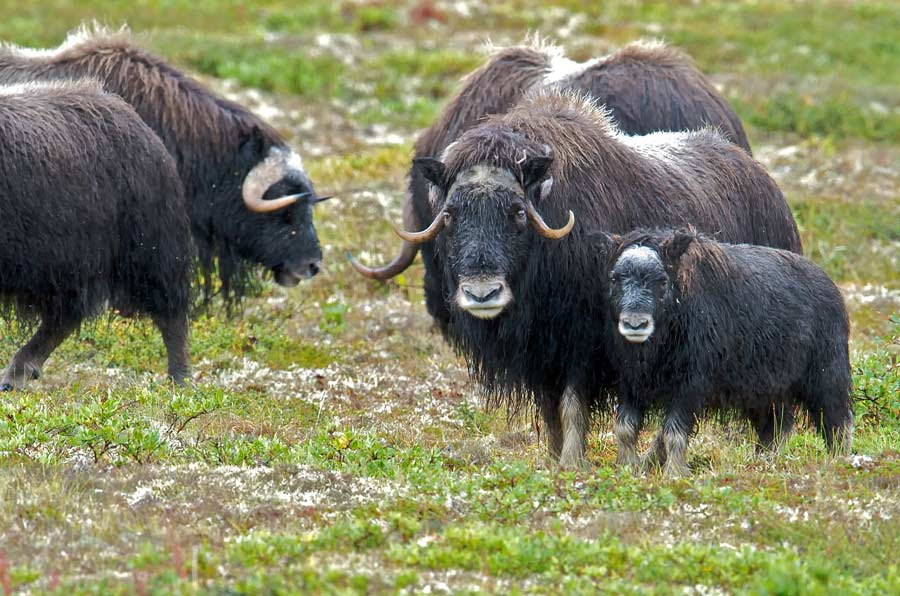
Muskox family

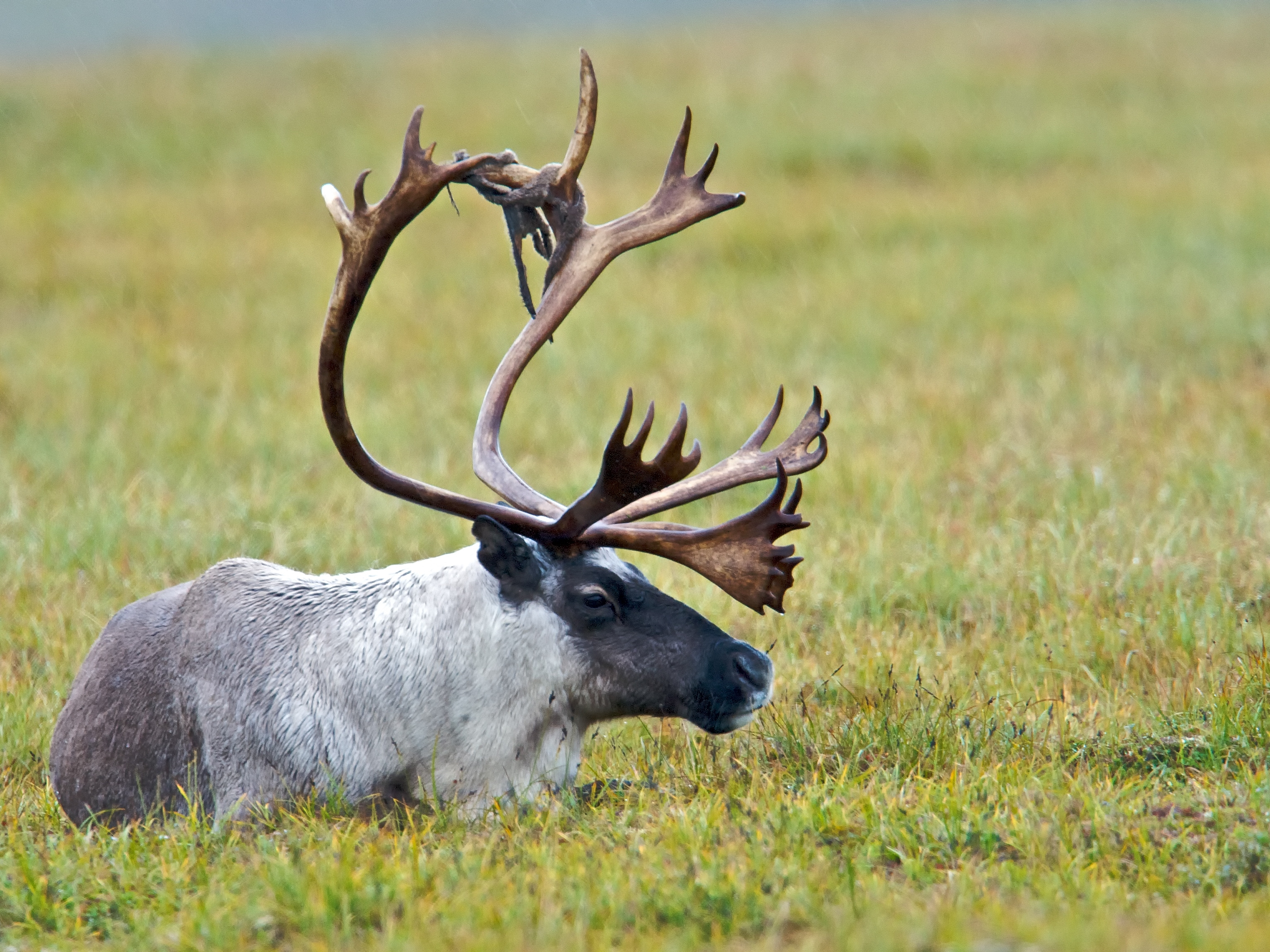
Caribou

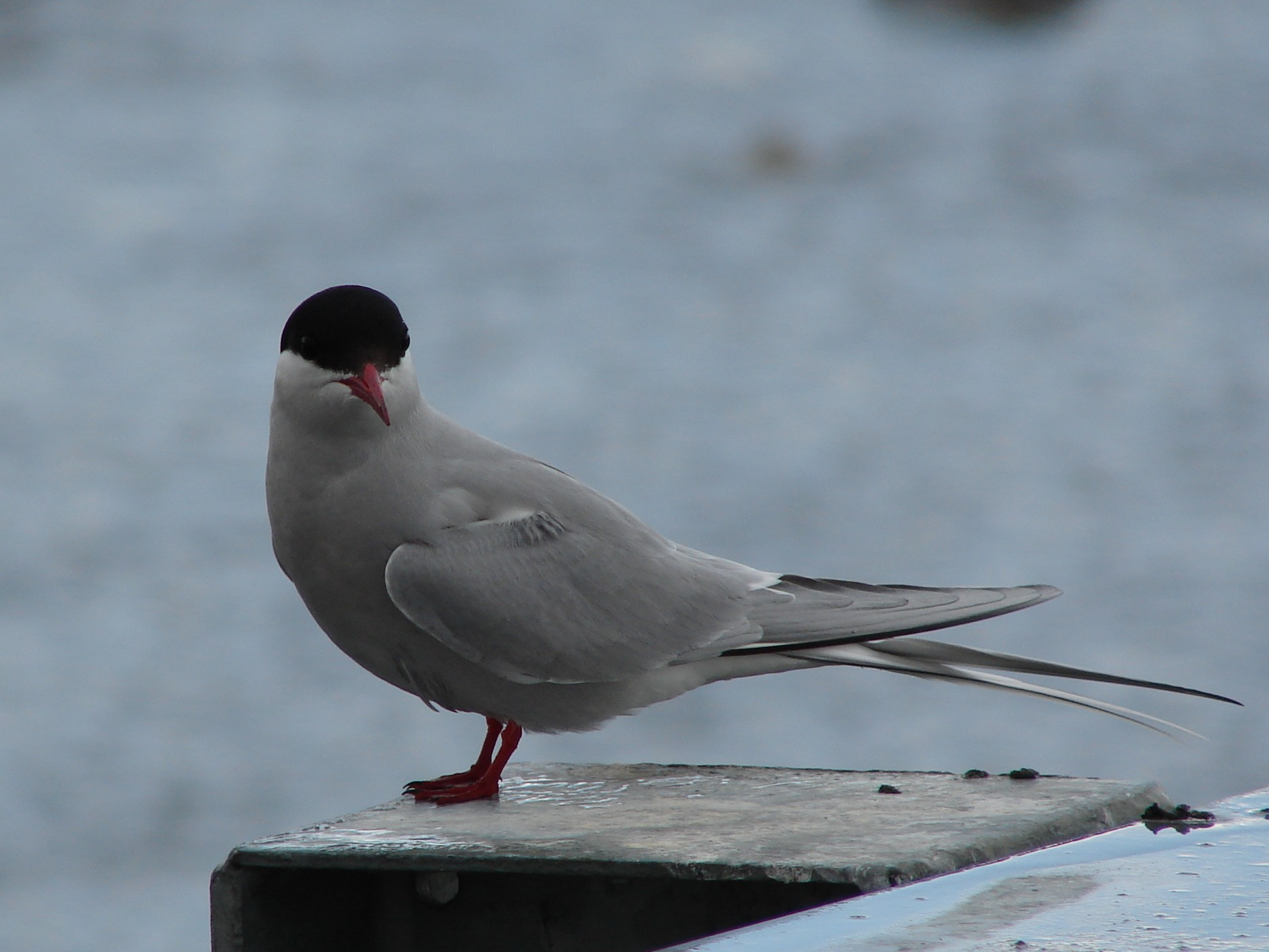
Arctic Tern

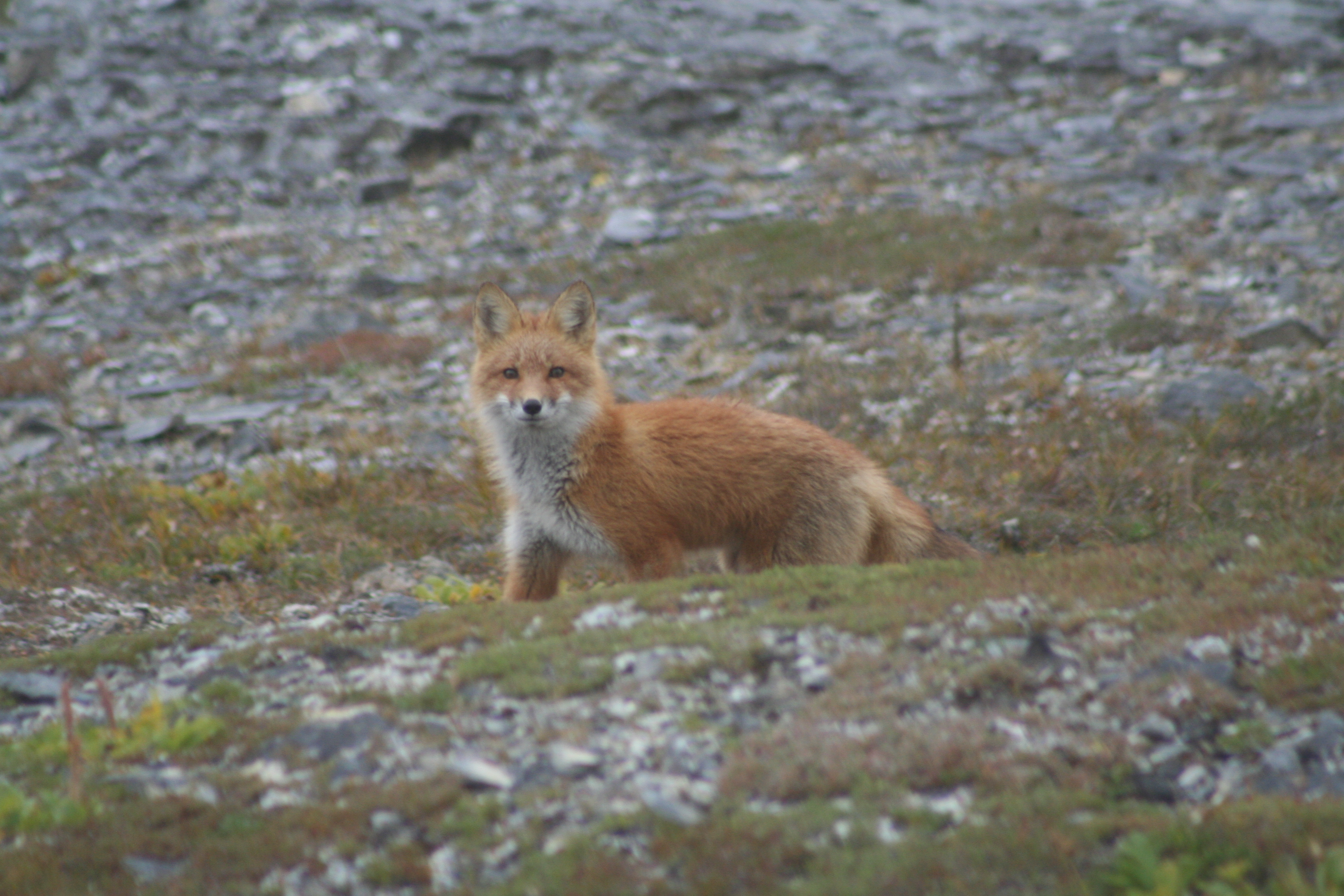
Red Fox

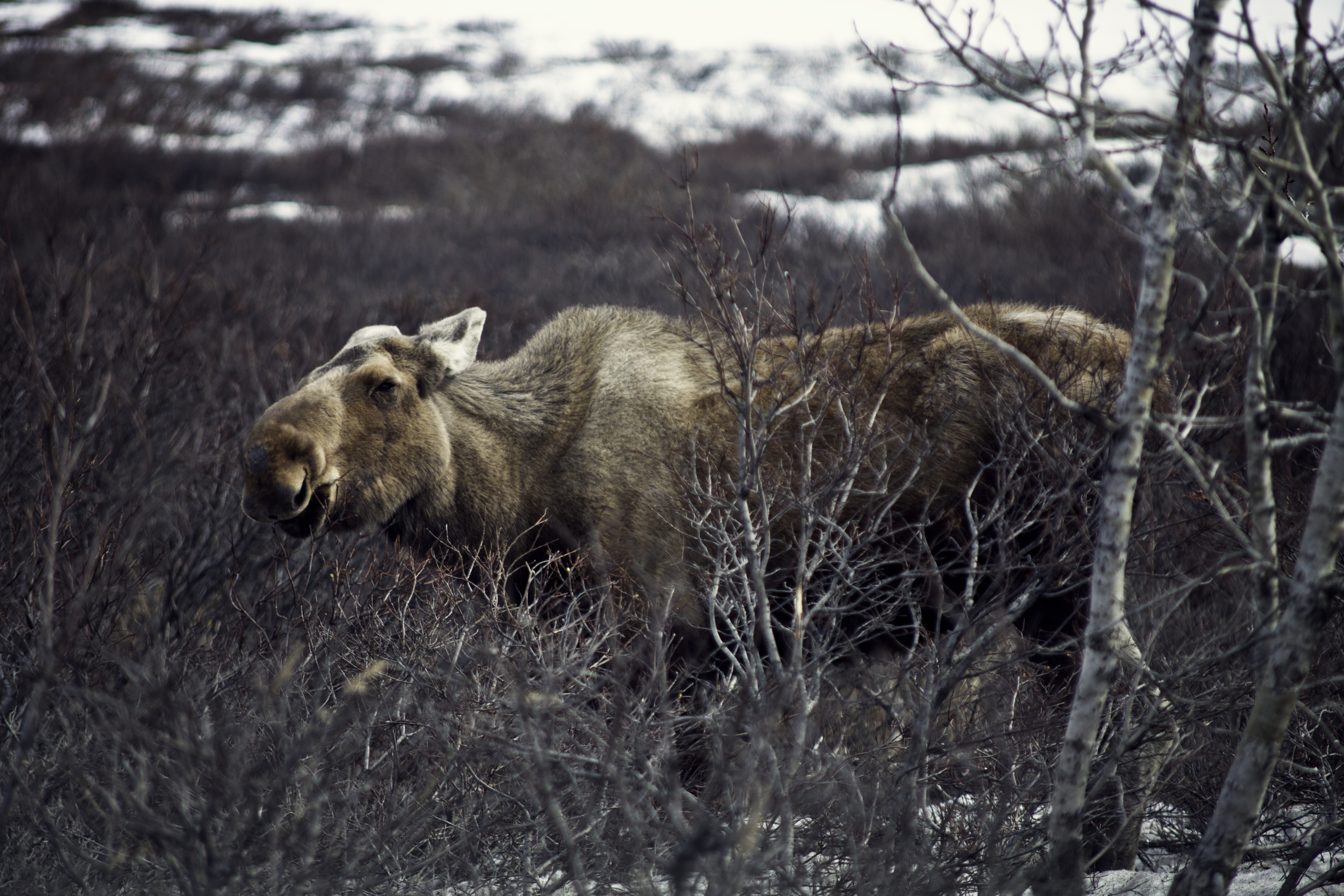
Moose

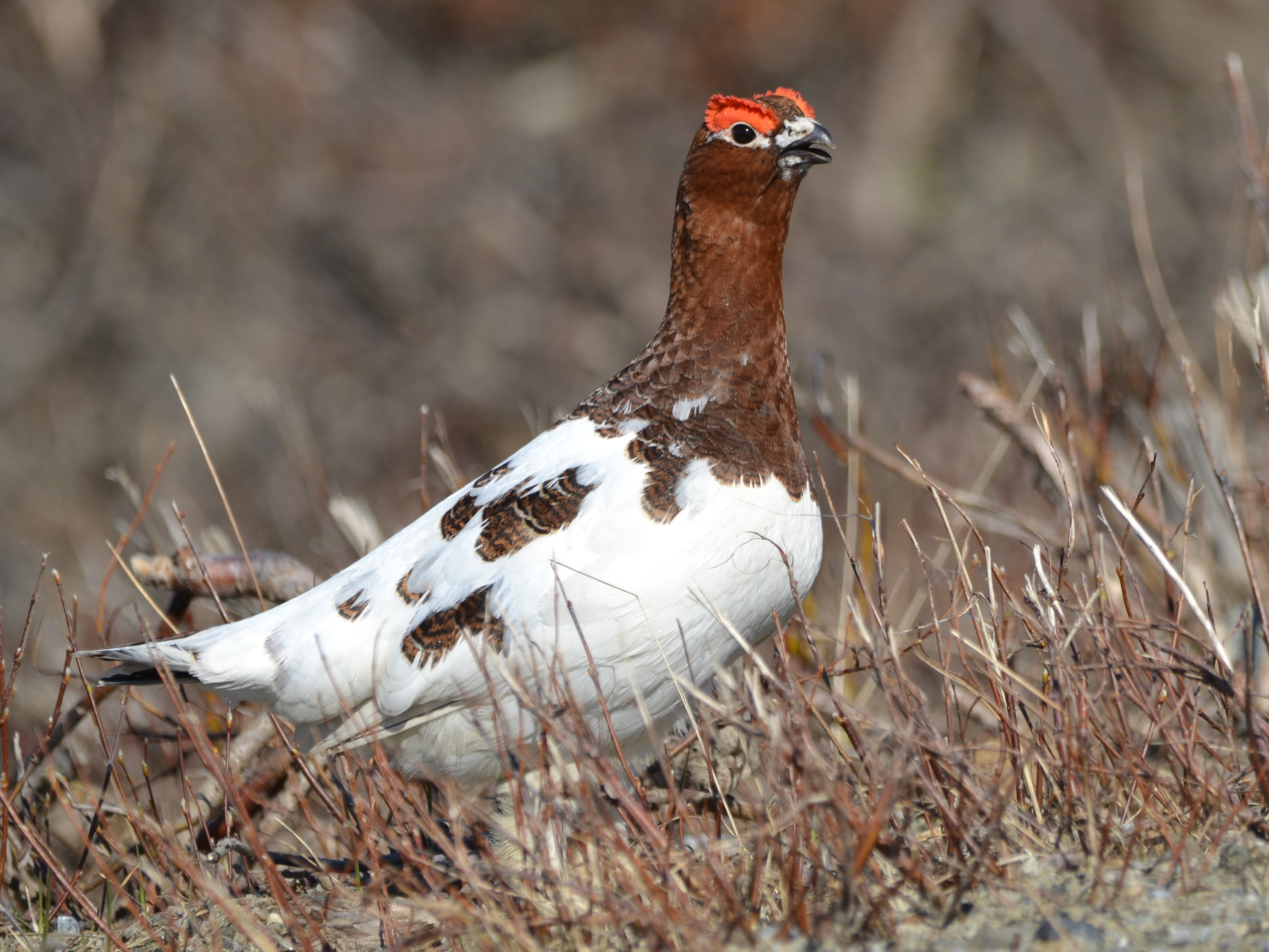
Willow ptarmigan

The Seward Peninsula's rivers and streams are habitat for freshwater fish and for anadromous salmon species. The principal salmon species are chinook, coho, sockeye, chum and pink salmon. Other salmonids such as Dolly Varden trout and Arctic grayling remain in freshwater throughout their life cycle. The preserve also harbors northern pike and other fish.

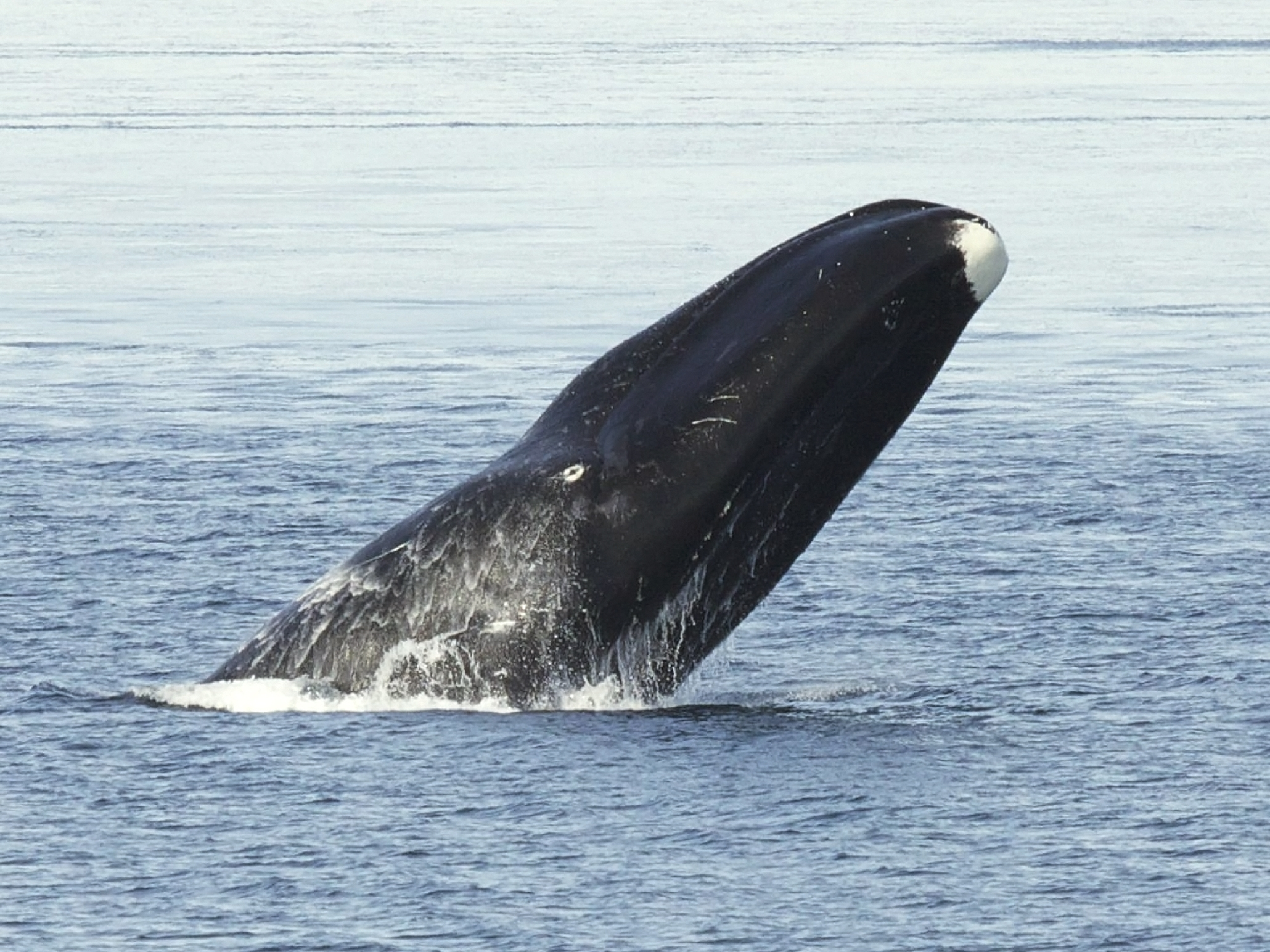
Bowhead whale breaching

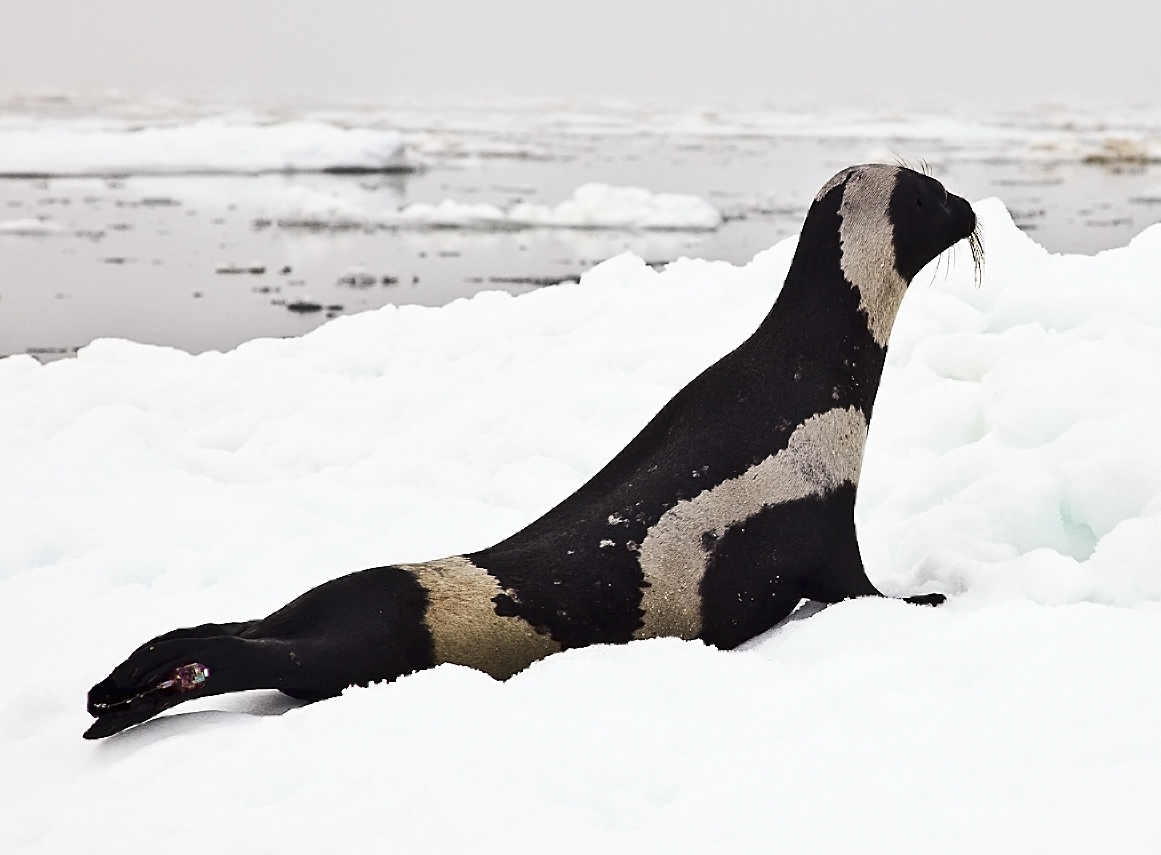
Ribbon Seal

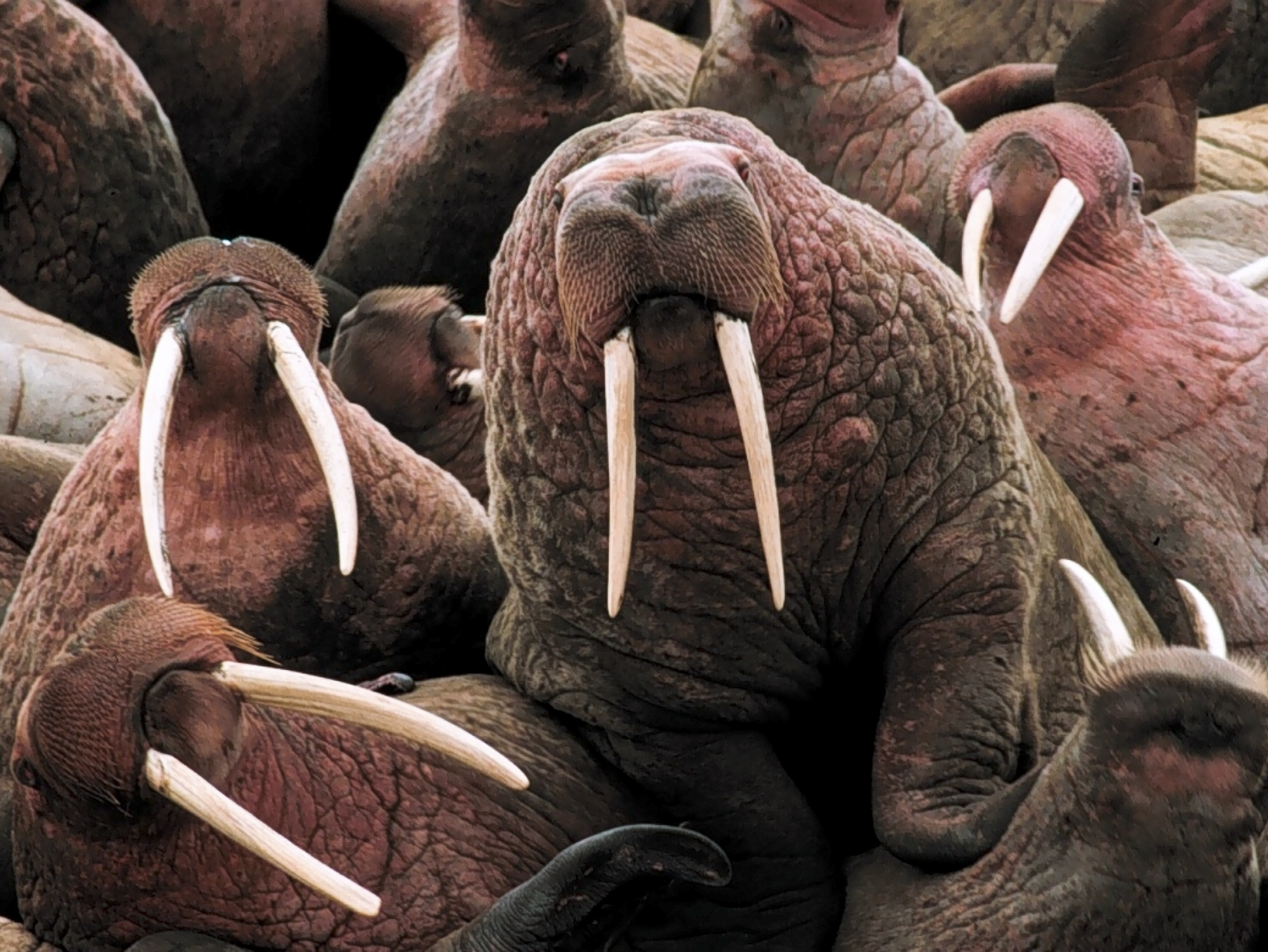
Walrus

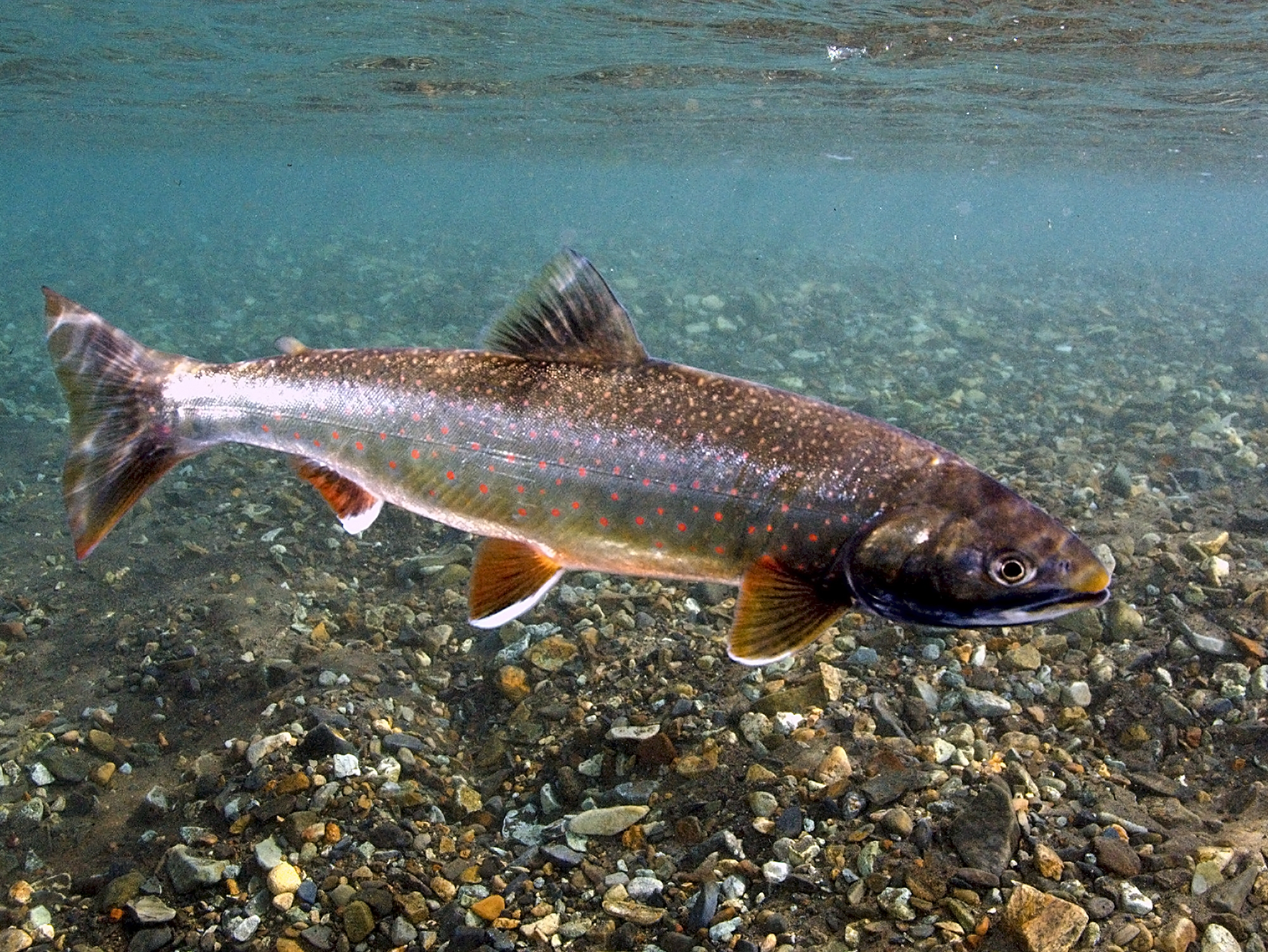
Dolly Varden trout

The preserve has weather typical of northwestern Alaska, with long cold winters. Weather is moderated by the coastal location, but temperatures can reach −65 °F (−54 °C) in winter and typical low temperatures in winter are −10 °F (−23 °C) to −20 °F (−29 °C). Summer temperatures average about 50 °F (10 °C). The average annual temperature is 21 °F (−6 °C).

=== Muskoxen mass death in 2011 ===
An entire herd of 55 muskoxen died in a storm surge in the National Reserve in February 2011. The herd had been crossing a bay in the Kotzebue Sound, when it was surprised by a combination of a tidal surge and flooding in connection with a winter storm. When the tidal surge reached the herd, it broke the ice underneath it and the herd plunged into the icy water. The temperature was below −30 °C, and the whole herd was killed and frozen in the ice. Four of the animals had been fitted with radio collars, and they were found by researchers looking for their signals. In addition to their reintroduction to this national preserve, the remaining population of muskoxen are currently in Gates of the Arctic National Park and Preserve as well as a local farm in Palmer which has existed since the mid-1950s.

== History ==
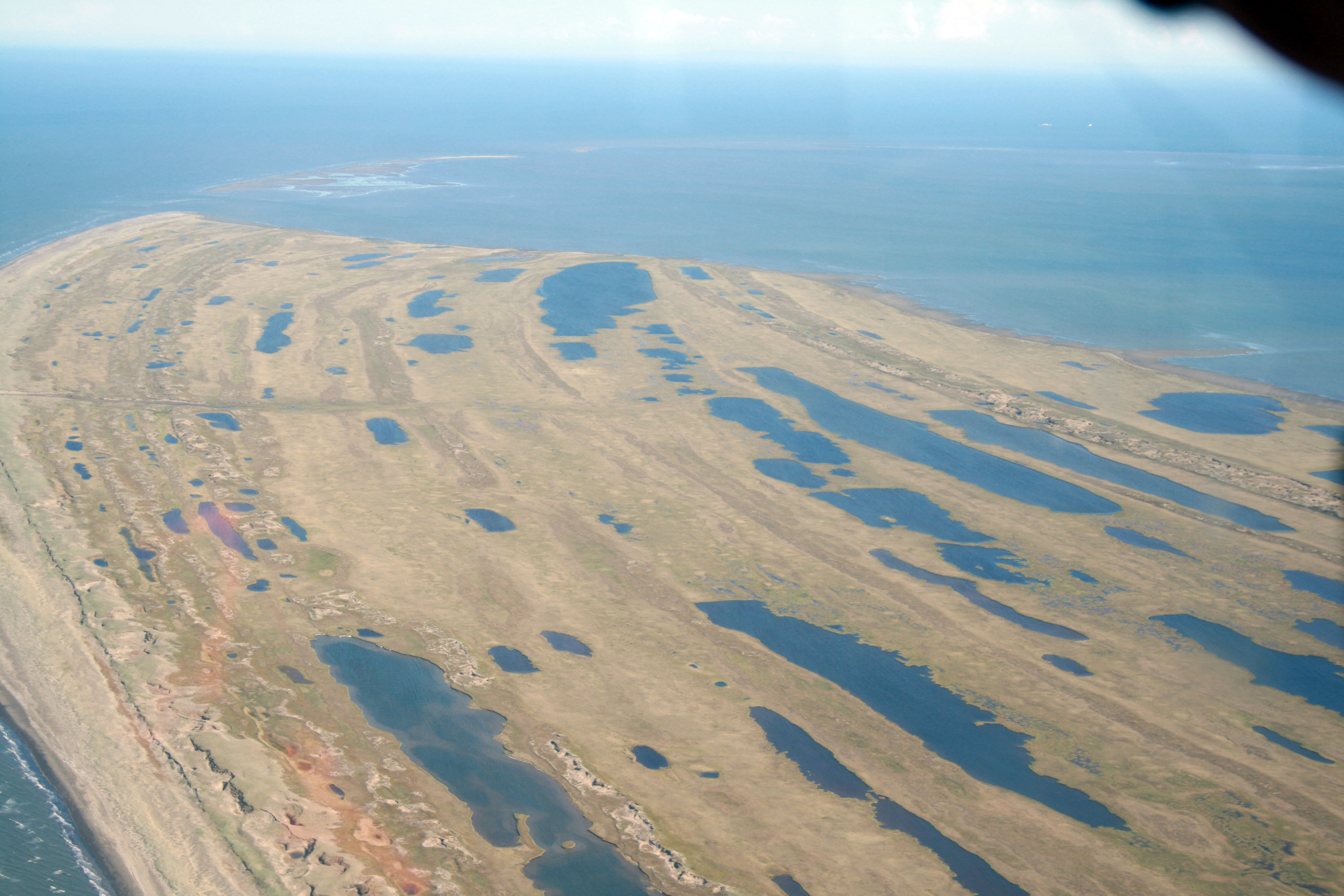
Cape Espenberg from the air

The Seward Peninsula, as part of Beringia, was a path for the migration of Asian peoples into the Americas. The earliest artifacts found in the area are modified animal bones dating to about 13,000 BC. These are not considered definitive, and the earliest undisputed evidence of human occupation are relics of the Paleo-Arctic tradition found in the Trail Creek Caves and dating to between 10,000 and 7,000 BC. Archaeological evidence suggests a gap in human occupation on the peninsula until about 4200 BC. Materials from the period 4000 to about 2000 BC, known as the Denbigh culture of the Arctic small tool tradition, have been found at Cape Espenberg, the Trail Creek Caves, Kuzitrin Lake and Agulaak Island. The Denbigh culture was followed by the Choris culture, which brought pottery and ground stone tools. Cape Espenberg, the Trail Creek Caves and the region around Lopp Lagoon were occupied during this time. This was followed by the Ipuitak culture from about 1900 BC to 1000 BC, at many of the same locations.

The Northern Maritime tradition followed, comprising the Birnirk, Western Thule and Kotzebue Period cultures. This series of cultures spanned the period from 600 AD to the early 1800s, when traditional lifestyles were disrupted by the arrival of Europeans in the area. The fur trade, whaling and missionary activities changed the local economy, which was further altered in the late 19th century by the arrival of prospectors looking for gold on the southern side of the Seward Peninsula. Prospectors spread out across the peninsula, with hydraulic mining undertaken in the Pinnel River in the preserve. The Seward Peninsula saw a further influx of outsiders during World War II, since Alaska was an important theater of the Pacific war.

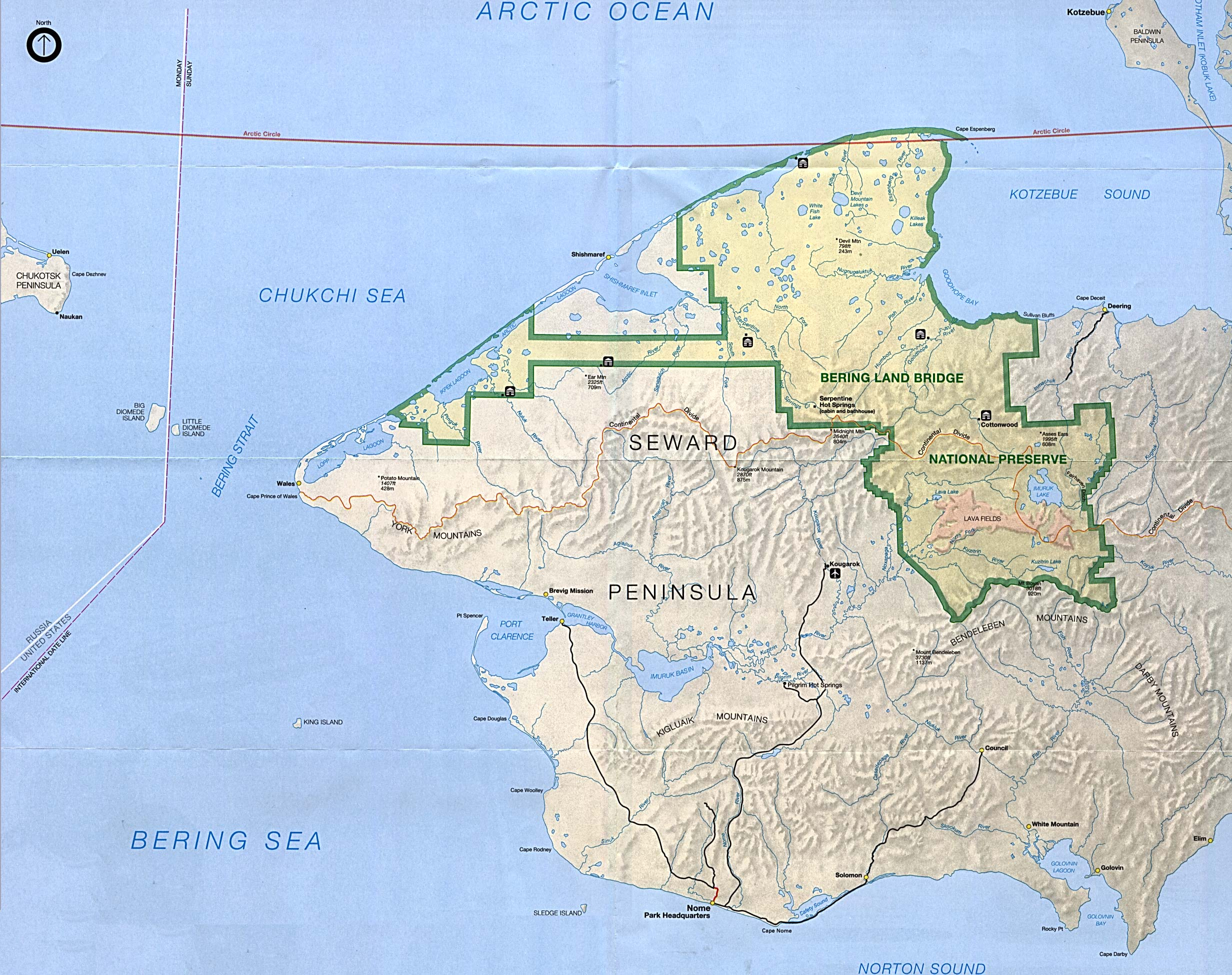
Map of the preserve on the Seward Peninsula

=== Administration and designations ===
Bering Land Bridge National Monument was established 1 December 1978, by President Jimmy Carter using his authority under the Antiquities Act. Carter took the action after the Alaska National Interest Lands Conservation Act (ANILCA) was held up in Congress. In 1980 ANILCA was passed, and was signed into law by Carter on 2 December 1980, converting the monument into a national preserve. The preserve's headquarters are in the Sitnasuak Building in Nome.

== See also ==
- Models of migration to the New World
