= Koyuk, Alaska =

Koyuk Kuuyuk (Inupiaq)
- City
- Location in Alaska
- Coordinates: 64°55′52″N 161°9′31″W
- Country: United States
- State: Alaska
- Census Area: Nome
- Incorporated: October 19, 1970

Government
  - Mayor: Darin Douglas, Sr.
  - State senator: Donald Olson (D)
  - State rep.: Neal Foster (D)

Area
  - Total: 5.10 sq mi (13.21 km^{2})
  - Land: 5.10 sq mi (13.21 km^{2})
  - Water: 0 sq mi (0.00 km^{2})
- Elevation: 33 ft (10 m)

Population (2020)
  - Total: 312
  - Density: 61.1/sq mi (23.61/km^{2})
- Time zone: UTC-9 (Alaska (AKST))
  - Summer (DST): UTC-8 (AKDT)
- ZIP code: 99753
- Area code: 907
- FIPS code: 02-41940
- GNIS feature ID: 1404981

Koyuk (Inupiaq: Kuuyuk) is a city in the Nome Census Area, Alaska, United States. As of the 2020 census, Koyuk had a population of 312.

== Geography ==
Koyuk is located at 64°55′52″N 161°9′31″W (64.931099, -161.158480). The village is located on the northern bank of the Koyuk River where it drains into Norton Bay.

According to the United States Census Bureau, the city has a total area of 4.7 square miles (12 km^{2}), all of it land.

== Demographics ==
Historical population
Census	Pop.	Note	%±
1930	110		—
1940	100		−9.1%
1950	134		34.0%
1960	129		−3.7%
1970	122		−5.4%
1980	188		54.1%
1990	231		22.9%
2000	297		28.6%
2010	332		11.8%
2020	312		−6.0%
U.S. Decennial Census

Koyuk first appeared on the 1930 U.S. census as an unincorporated village. It formally incorporated in 1970.

=== 2020 census ===
As of the 2020 census, Koyuk had a population of 312. The median age was 26.3 years. 39.7% of residents were under the age of 18 and 7.4% of residents were 65 years of age or older. For every 100 females there were 127.7 males, and for every 100 females age 18 and over there were 129.3 males age 18 and over.

0.0% of residents lived in urban areas, while 100.0% lived in rural areas.

There were 91 households in Koyuk, of which 46.2% had children under the age of 18 living in them. Of all households, 33.0% were married-couple households, 27.5% were households with a male householder and no spouse or partner present, and 20.9% were households with a female householder and no spouse or partner present. About 17.6% of all households were made up of individuals and 3.3% had someone living alone who was 65 years of age or older.

There were 103 housing units, of which 11.7% were vacant. The homeowner vacancy rate was 0.0% and the rental vacancy rate was 4.2%.

Racial composition as of the 2020 census
Race	Number	Percent
White	12	3.8%
Black or African American	1	0.3%
American Indian and Alaska Native	280	89.7%
Asian	2	0.6%
Native Hawaiian and Other Pacific Islander	0	0.0%
Some other race	0	0.0%
Two or more races	17	5.4%
Hispanic or Latino (of any race)	4	1.3%

=== 2000 census ===
As of the census of 2000, there were 297 people, 80 households, and 59 families residing in the city. The population density was 62.7 inhabitants per square mile (24.2/km^{2}). There were 95 housing units at an average density of 20.1 per square mile (7.8/km^{2}). The racial makeup of the city was 4.71% White, 91.92% Native American, 0.67% Asian, and 2.69% from two or more races.

Of the 80 households, 53.8% had children under the age of 18 living with them, 35.0% were married couples living together, 18.8% had a female householder with no husband present, and 26.3% were non-families. 21.3% of all households were made up of individuals, and 2.5% had someone living alone who was 65 years of age or older. The average household size was 3.71 and the average family size was 4.31.

In the city, the age distribution of the population shows 41.8% under the age of 18, 8.8% from 18 to 24, 30.0% from 25 to 44, 16.5% from 45 to 64, and 3.0% who were 65 years of age or older. The median age was 25 years. For every 100 females, there were 121.6 males. For every 100 females age 18 and over, there were 127.6 males.

The median income for a household in the city was $30,417, and the median income for a family was $20,625. Males had a median income of $25,625 versus $11,563 for females. The per capita income for the city was $8,736. About 29.3% of families and 28.0% of the population were below the poverty line, including 39.7% of those under the age of eighteen and 25.0% of those 65 or over.

== Education ==
Koyuk is served by the Bering Strait School District. Koyuk-Malimiut School serves grades Pre-K through 12.
