= Carl J. Lomen =

American entrepreneur and photographer

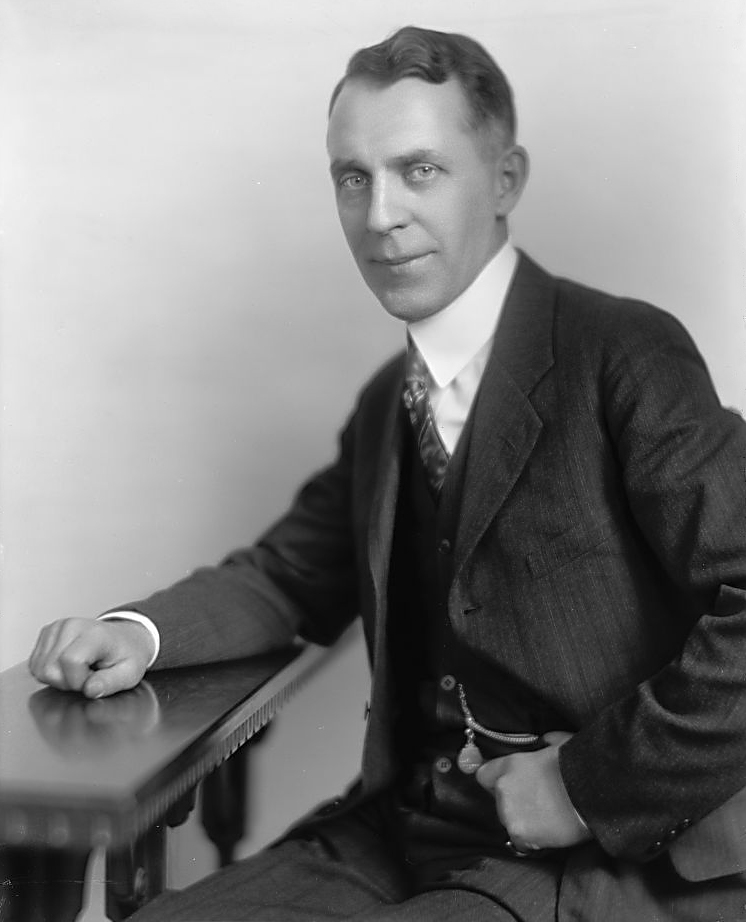
- Carl J. Lomen, prior to 1923
- Born: July 13, 1880; St. Paul, Minnesota, U.S.
- Died: August 16, 1965; Seattle, Washington, U.S.
- Occupations: Businessman, photographer

Carl Joys Lomen (July 13, 1880 – August 16, 1965) was an American entrepreneur and photographer. He was known as The Reindeer King of Alaska, because of his role in "organizing, promoting, marketing, and lobbying for the reindeer industry" in the first decades of the 20th century, as president of the Lomen Company.

In 1954, he published his autobiography, Fifty Years in Alaska (New York: David McKay). He died on August 16, 1965.
