= Lomen Company =

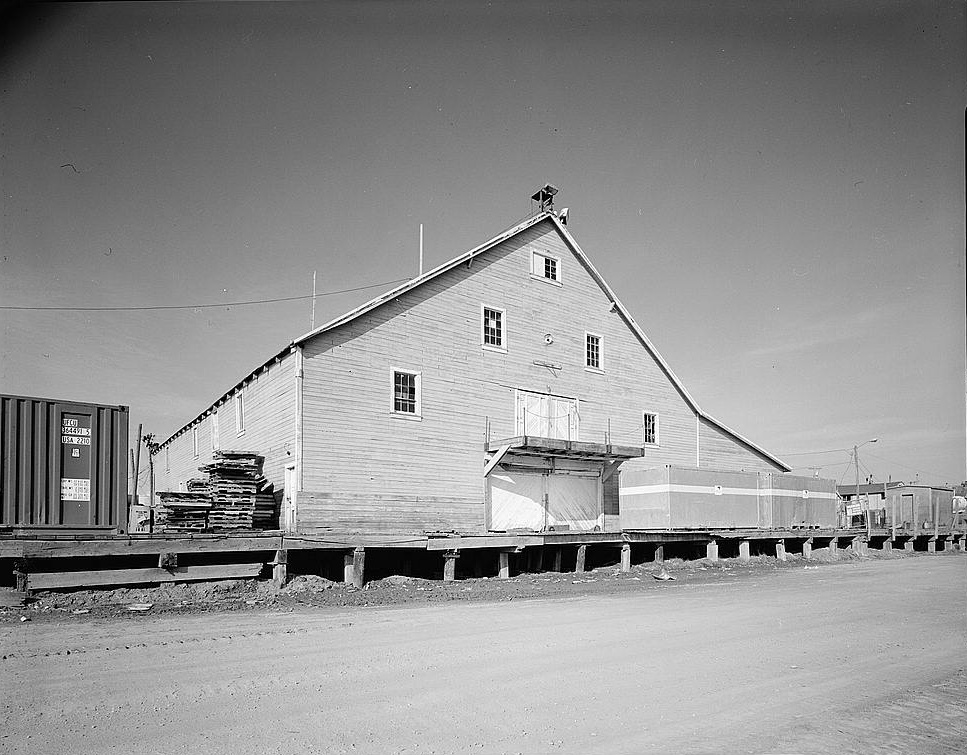
Lomen Company's warehouse at Nome, Alaska.

Lomen Company was an American meatpacking industry, founded in 1914 by brothers Carl and Alfred Lomen in the then Territory of Alaska.

== History ==
The Lomen Brothers invested in the purchase of reindeer herds, and between 1920 and 1929, they mounted a huge structure of slaughterhouses and processing facilities, still getting success with the crossbreeding of caribou and reindeer. Then they proceeded to dominate the export market of reindeer meat and skins for the United States, making inviable the competition for the Inuit small farmers. Between 1914 and 1929, Lomen acquired 14,083 reindeer, at the total cost of US$ 236,156.00.

At Christmas, 1926, in conjunction with Macy's, Lomen developed a clever marketing campaign to publicize its main product: the reindeer. Santa Claus in a sleigh pulled by reindeer, was introduced in several U.S. cities (including Boston, San Francisco, Chicago and Seattle, among others). The Lomen brothers still forged letters published in newspapers, where children asked for the presence of Santa and his reindeer in some cities. It has been argued that the reindeer-drawn sleigh became an integral part of the American Christmas story as a result of this marketing campaign. Reindeer were first associated with Santa Claus a century earlier, in Clement Clarke Moore's poem "A Visit from St. Nicholas", however.

The Lomen Company, however, began to have trouble with the lobby of cattle producers, who lobbied Congress to impose barriers to the promotion and sale of reindeer meat. Before that happened, in 1929, with the crash of 29, the market for Lomen's products began to decline. The final blow was given on September 1, 1937, when the Reindeer Act transferred the possession of all Alaskan reindeer herds to the Bureau of Indian Affairs (and, therefore, for the hands of the Inuit), paying $3 or $4 per head. The Lomen's herds was then acquired by the U.S. government for the gross amount of US$720,000.00.

Only in 1997 a court decision allowed to non-natives to acquire reindeer herds in Alaska.
