= Arnica alpina =

Arnica alpina is a botanical synonym of three species of plant:

- Arnica angustifolia, synonym published in 1799 by Johan Henrick Olin & Johan Fredrik Ladau
- Arnica montana, synonym published in 1821 by Ernst Gottlieb von Steudel
- Doronicum pardalianches, synonym published in 1796 by Richard Anthony Salisbury
