= Reindeer Act =

- Long title: An Act to provide subsistence for the Eskimos and other natives of Alaska by establishing for them a permanent and self-sustaining economy; to encourage and develop native activity in all branches of the reindeer industry; and for other purposes.
- Nicknames: Reindeer Industry Act of 1937
- Enacted by: the 75th United States Congress
- Effective: September 1, 1937

Citations
- Public law: 75-413
- Statutes at Large: 50 Stat. 900

Codification
- Titles amended: 25 U.S.C.: Indians
- U.S.C. sections created: 25 U.S.C. ch. 14, subch. VII § 500 et seq.

Legislative history
- Introduced in the Senate as S. 1722 by Elmer Thomas (D-OK) on May 6, 1937; Committee consideration by Senate Indian Affairs, House Rules, House Territories; Passed the Senate on May 10, 1937 (Passed); Passed the House on August 20, 1937 (Passed) with amendment; Senate agreed to House amendment on August 21, 1937 (Passed); Signed into law by President Franklin D. Roosevelt on September 1, 1937

The Reindeer Act or Reindeer Industry Act of 1937 is a United States federal law passed in 1937 by the U.S. Congress and signed into law by President Franklin D. Roosevelt on September 1 of that year. The act effectively prohibited the ownership of reindeer herds in Alaska by non-Native Americans. The act was intended to provide for Alaskan natives and to allow them to establish a self-sustaining industry. Authority to promulgate rules regarding the ownership and maintenance of reindeer herds was delegated to the Bureau of Indian Affairs via the Secretary of the Interior, who banned most transactions to non-natives.

The act was modeled in part on Norwegian and Swedish policies on the ownership of reindeer by the Sami people of Lapland. Many Sami had arrived in Alaska to manage the reindeer in the 1930s. The Alaskan Sami were required to sell their herds to the government, and many left Alaska after doing so.

For sixty years the Reindeer Act maintained a native and government monopoly in live reindeer in Alaska. By 1989 the regulations were challenged in court, resulting in a legal distinction between reindeer imported after 1937 by non-Natives and the Native herds. Between 1937 and 1940, the herd population declined drastically as reindeer joined native herds of caribou or were lost on the range. A 1997 decision opened ownership to non-natives.

== See also ==
- Lomen Company, which owned most of the reindeer in Alaska until 1937
- Alaska Reindeer Service, government office involved in the introduction of the reindeer industry to Alaska.
