= Lost Jim Lava Flow =

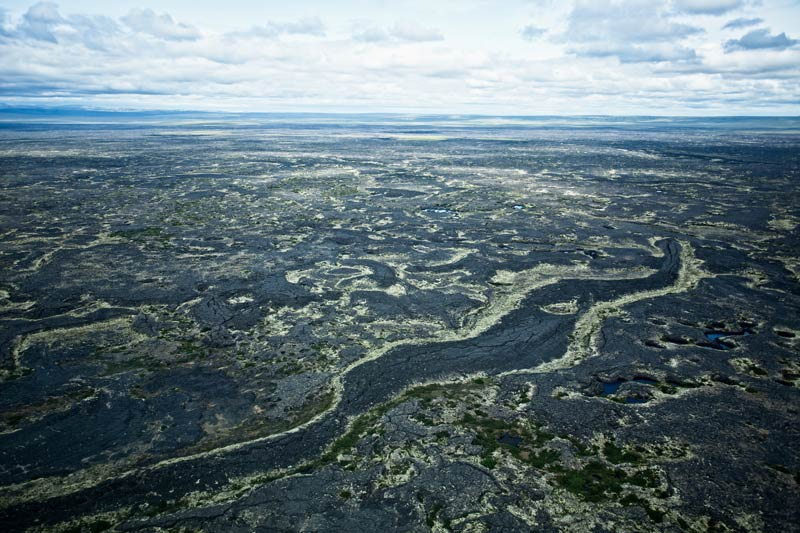
The Lost Jim Lava Flow

The Lost Jim Lava Flow, located in the heart of the Seward Peninsula in Alaska, is a Holocene lava flow in the Bering Land Bridge National Preserve. The name originates from a member of a USGS research team who became separated from the rest of the group while mapping the lava flow in 1947. The Lost Jim cone, its largest vent, is located at 65°29′19″N 163°17′49″W.
