= Espenberg =

Espenberg may refer to:

- Espenberg, Alaska, a settlement in Alaska
- Espenberg River, a river in Alaska
- Espenberg volcanic field, a volcanic field in Alaska
- Cape Espenberg, a cape on the Seward Peninsula in Alaska

== See also ==
- Espen Berg (disambiguation)
