= Aniakchak =

Aniakchak may refer to:

- Aniakchak National Monument and Preserve
- Mount Aniakchak
- Aniakchak River
