= Espen Berg =

Espen Berg may refer to:

- Espen Berg (humanitarian)
- Espen Berg (musician)

== See also ==
- Espen Berg-Knutsen, Norwegian sport shooter
- Espenberg (disambiguation)
