= Bernard R. Hubbard =

American geologist, explorer, and Jesuit priest

The Reverend Bernard R. Hubbard SJ
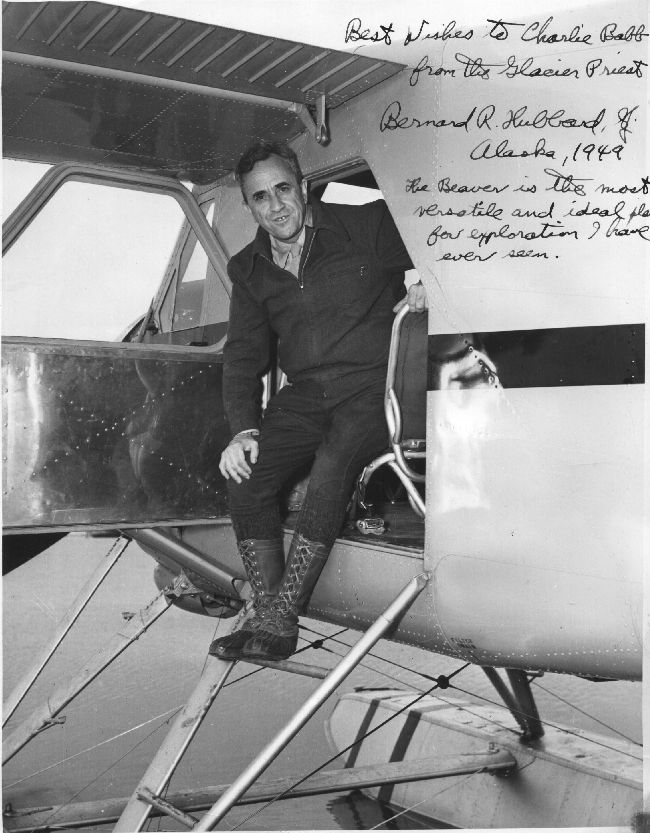
- Hubbard in a DHC-2 Beaver airplane, 1949
- Born: Bernard Rosecrans Hubbard; November 24, 1888; San Francisco, California, U.S.
- Died: May 28, 1962 (aged 73); Santa Clara, California, U.S.
- Other name: "Glacier Priest"
- Education: Los Angeles College
- Alma mater: Gonzaga University (MA)
- Occupations: Geologist, explorer, Jesuit priest

Bernard Rosecrans Hubbard (November 24, 1888 – May 28, 1962) was an American geologist and explorer who popularized the Alaskan wilderness in American media during the middle of the 20th century. Known as "the Glacier Priest", he was a Jesuit priest, head of the Department of Geology at the University of Santa Clara, California, and for a time was the highest-paid lecturer in the world, leading 31 expeditions into Alaska and the Arctic.

== Early life ==
Hubbard was born in San Francisco, California, on November 24, 1888, the son of George M. Hubbard (d. 1914) and Catherine Wilder Hubbard (d. 1910). His siblings were John, who became a mining engineer, and sister Mary Hubbard Stanley. Hubbard spent his childhood in Santa Cruz, California, living for a while in a house that his brother built in the mountains above Santa Cruz near Ben Lomond. The mountain house is now owned by the Lockheed Corporation and is marked with a commemorative plaque. Hubbard attended Santa Clara College from 1906 to 1908. On September 7, 1908, he entered the Society of Jesus, first studying at the Jesuit novitiate in Los Gatos 1908–1910, then at Los Angeles College 1913–1918. He then studied at the Mount Saint Michaels' Jesuit seminary in Spokane, Washington, where he received a Master of Arts degree in philosophy through Gonzaga University in 1921. Hubbard then studied theology in Innsbruck, Austria, where he was ordained a priest in 1923. During his time in Austria, he became enamored of the mountains and became known as "Der Gletscher Pfarrer" ("the Glacier Priest"). In 1925 and 1926 Hubbard completed his tertianship at St. Andrew-on-Hudson in Hyde Park, New York.

== Explorer and lecturer ==
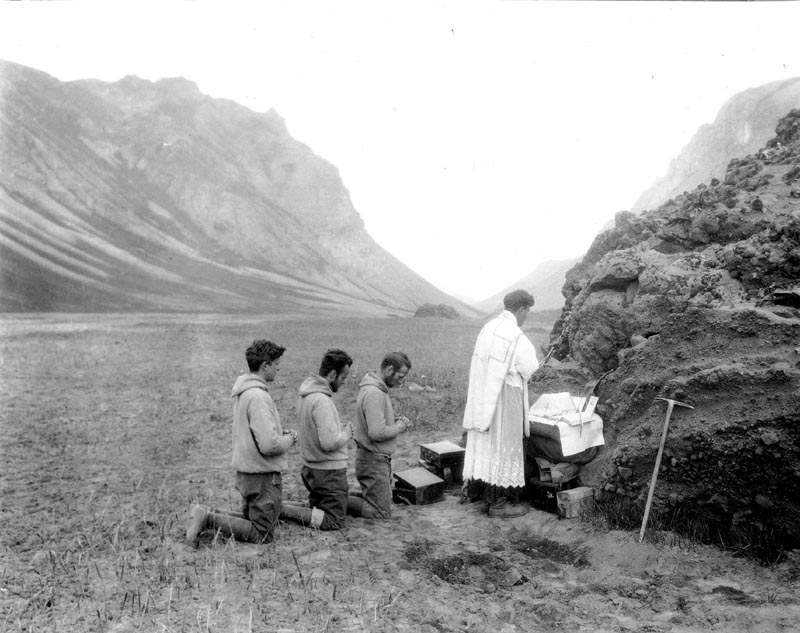
Hubbard celebrating Mass in Aniakchak

In 1926, Hubbard returned to Santa Clara College as a lecturer in German, geology and theology, teaching there until 1930. Colleagues noted that "his heart wasn't completely in academics." From 1927 to 1962, Hubbard undertook regular expeditions to Alaska during the summer, touring in the winter as a lecturer. He was described as the highest-paid lecturer in the world by the Literary Digest in 1937, receiving up to $2000 per lecture. Hubbard, with the approval of his Jesuit superiors, donated the proceeds of his lectures to the Jesuit mission in Alaska. Hubbard's first trip to Alaska was a study of the Juneau Icefield. In 1929 he visited the Valley of Ten Thousand Smokes, sparking his interest in volcanology. In 1930 he undertook the first significant expedition to the largely unknown volcanic crater at Mount Aniakchak, returning in 1931 after the Yukon trip and again in 1932. By a fortunate coincidence, there had been a moderate eruption of the Aniakchak volcano weeks before Hubbard and his party arrived on the second expedition in May 1931. On subsequent trips Hubbard explored the upper reaches of Taku Glacier and made a crossing of the Bering Strait by canoe. Another expedition in 1936 took Hubbard back to the Valley of Ten Thousand Smokes, farther east on the Alaska Peninsula.

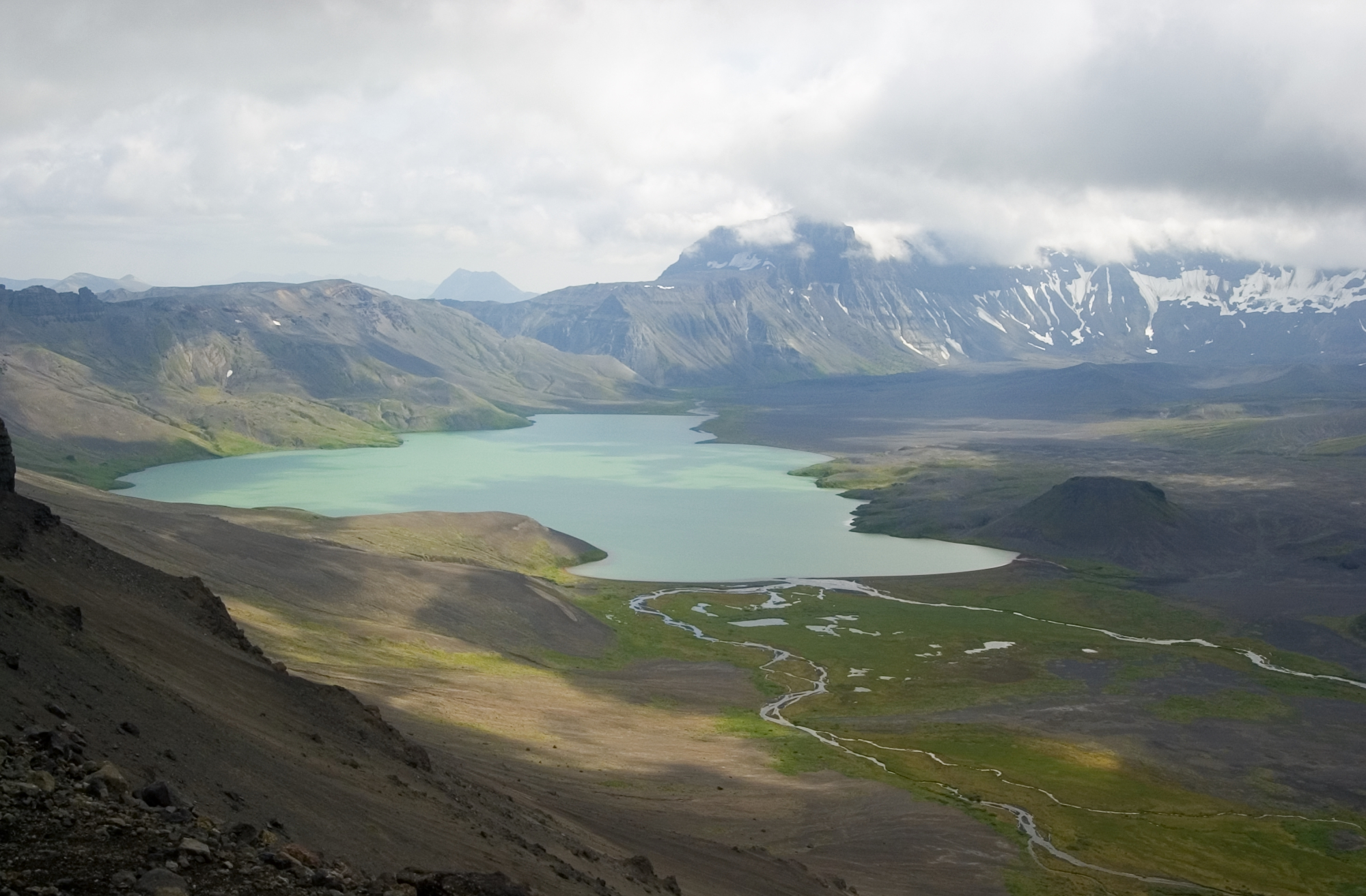
Surprise Lake in the Aniakchak caldera

Hubbard's 1931 expedition took him down the Yukon River, visiting missions on the way. He started in the winter from Nenana with a 13-dog sled, ending at Nulato. From there he want to Unalakleet, then to the Holy Cross mission on the Yukon by April 1931. From Holy Cross, he started out for the Alaska Peninsula in a floatplane, the first airplane ride of his life and the first flight along the Bering Sea coast. Hubbard and his flight crew flew directly across the peninsula at Aniakchak, viewing the aftermath of the May 1931 eruption from the air, and nearly crashing in the process. He joined three college students who had brought the expedition's gear to Kujulik Bay on June 12. They climbed to the entrance to the crater, encountering (and killing) bears as they went. They explored the still active crater for 33 days. On the 1932 expedition, Hubbard and pilot Frank Dorbandt made the first successful landing on a lake in a volcano, landing on Surprise Lake in the Aniakchak crater.

=== Anthropology ===
Hubbard did not enjoy the high regard of his former colleagues at Santa Clara, who complained that he made "outlandish blunders" in geology. Hubbard offered tart responses to criticisms from those he perceived as armchair academics, but through the 1930s his interests shifted to the culture of native Alaskans. Hubbard's reception from anthropologists was similar to his experience with geologists. Hubbard spent considerable time in 1937–38 documenting the Iñupiat and Yup'ik peoples, particularly the Iñupiat of King Island, advancing theories of linguistic relationships with Asian languages that did not find favor in scholarship. Hubbard produced extensive still photographic and cinematic documentation of King Islander life, totaling 11,000 stills and 40,000 feet (12,000 m) of movie film. As with his photographs of volcanic features, his photographic documentation of native culture has been more enduring than his writings.

=== Lectures ===
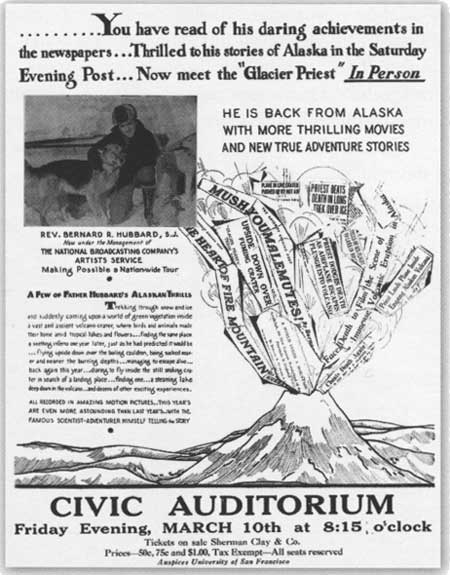
A flyer for a Hubbard lecture

Described as a riveting lecturer, Hubbard was skilled in the creation of early multimedia presentations using still pictures, films and his own dramatic narration. Hubbard used a writing style similar to that of Jack London, who had done his own part to popularize the Alaskan frontier in the early 20th century. A dramatic retelling of his first visit to Aniakchak by Alaskan author Barrett Willoughby entitled "The Moon Craters of Alaska" in the Saturday Evening Post made his reputation in December 1930. Following the eruption at Aniakchak in May 1931, Hubbard was invited to lecture at the Interior Department in Washington, where National Park Service director Horace M. Albright was considering Aniakchak as a new national monument. Hubbard's before-and-after images of Aniakchak in 1930 and 1931 – entitled in typical Hubbard prose as "Paradise Found" and "Paradise Lost" – have provided valuable baseline data for estimates of vegetative growth and recovery after volcanic activity. Hubbard compiled the movie footage he shot on his 1930–1932 expeditions into the 1933 film Aniakchak, which was distributed by Fox Studios and played worldwide. Hubbard maintained a grueling lecture schedule. In 1944–45 he gave 93 lectures in 63 days to audiences of up to 7000 people at such venues as Shrine Auditorium in Los Angeles, Constitution Hall in Washington, D.C., and Carnegie Hall in New York.

Hubbard's lecture career also provided commercial opportunities. In addition to the wilderness and adventure stories, audiences appreciated the stories of Hubbard's sled dog team. When looking for a spokesperson to promote its innovative dry kibble dog food (named "Friskies"), Carnation chose Hubbard and sled dog Katmai as spokesperson and spokescanine.

=== Later career ===
In 1930, Hubbard had started a mutually beneficial relationship with the Alaska Packers' Association (APA), which operated salmon canneries in the region. Hubbard wrote positively about the salmon industry and produced Alaska's Silver Millions, a documentary on salmon and canneries. Hubbard received transportation and logistical assistance from the APA, and was a lobbyist for the APA in Washington while Alaskan statehood was under debate in the 1950s.

During and after World War II, Hubbard advised the U.S. military on matters associated with Alaska, as well as lecturing and ministering to military personnel. Following an evening with Hubbard in late 1945, General George S. Patton described Hubbard as "very anti-Russian and anti-Semitic and talks very well when he forgets to advertise himself." In the war years, he traveled the world to document Jesuit missions that had been damaged or destroyed during the war, raising funds for their reconstruction. In the late 1940s, he established Hubbard Laboratories (also known as Hubbard Educational Films) to produce and distribute documentaries. In 1955, Hubbard suffered a stroke in Hartford, Connecticut, followed by more in subsequent years. Hubbard appeared on the April 30, 1958, episode of This Is Your Life.

== Death and legacy ==
Hubbard reduced his activities until his death by his fifth stroke on May 28, 1962, at the Donohoe Infirmary at the University of Santa Clara, aged 73. Hubbard was remembered by Newsweek in this notice:

Died: The Rev. Bernard Rosencrantz Hubbard, 73, the Glacier Priest, a tireless Jesuit who led 32 expeditions to Alaska and once listed the requisites of an explorer as "a strong back, a strong stomach, a dumb head, and a guardian angel."

Hubbard received honorary doctorate degrees from Marquette University in 1937 and from Trinity College of Connecticut in 1941. He wrote three books and published stories in numerous periodicals, including National Geographic and the Saturday Evening Post.

== Works ==
=== Books ===
- Mush, You Malamutes (1932)
- Cradle of the Storms (1935)
- Alaskan Odyssey (1952)

=== Movies ===
- Aniakchak (1933)
- Alaska's Silver Millions (1936)

== See also ==
- Gardiner Greene Hubbard, one of the founders of the National Geographic Society, namesake of several Alaskan landmarks
- Aniakchak National Monument and Preserve, established in 1978, 41 years after it was first proposed

== Bibliography ==
- Ringsmuth, Katherine Johnson (2007) Beyond the Moon Crater Myth: A New History of the Aniakchak Landscape, National Park Service
- Scarborough, Caprice Murray; Kingston, Deanna M. (2001), The Legacy of the "Glacier Priest": Bernard R. Hubbard, S.J. Santa Clara, California: Santa Clara University, Department of Anthropology and Sociology
