= Pre-Columbian trans–Bering Strait contact =

Ancient contacts between peoples from Alaska and Siberia

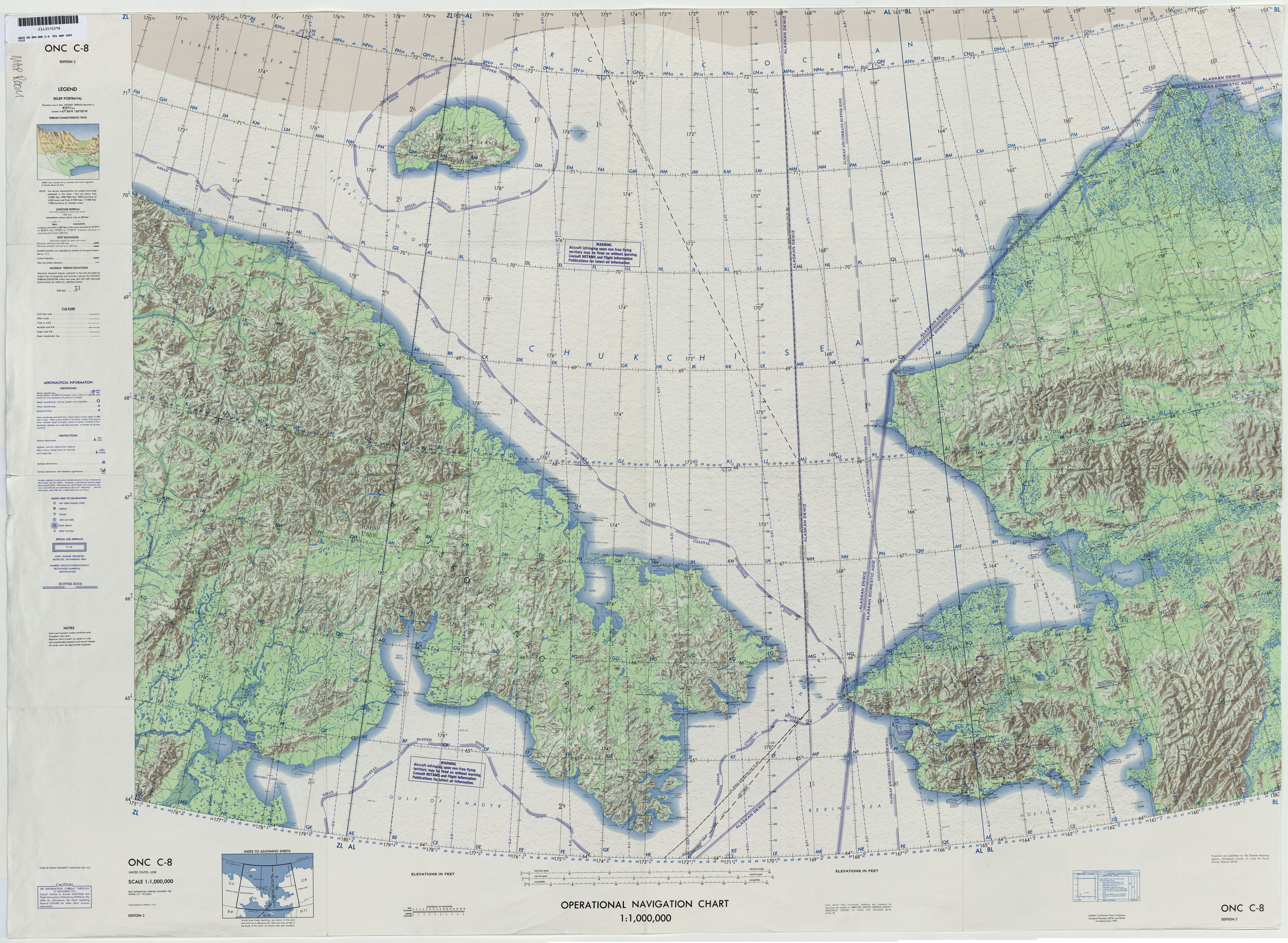
Defense Mapping Agency topographical map of the Bering Strait, 1973

The similar cultures of peoples across the Bering Strait in both Siberia and Alaska suggest human travel between the two places ever since the strait was formed. After Paleo-Indians arrived during the Last Glacial Period and began the settlement of the Americas, a second wave of people from Asia came to Alaska around 8000 BCE. These Na-Dene peoples, who share many linguistic and genetic similarities not found in other parts of the Americas, populated the far north of the Americas and only made it as far south as Oasisamerica. It is suggested that by 4000–3000 BCE Paleo-Eskimo peoples began coming to the Americas from Siberia. They were subsequently replaced by the Thule people around 1200 CE. Inuit tribes live today in both Asia and North America and there is much evidence that they lived in Asia even in prehistory.

== Metal artifacts ==
Bronze artifacts discovered in a 1,000-year-old house in Alaska suggest pre-Columbian trade. Bronze working had not been developed in Alaska at the time, and the findings suggest the bronze came from nearby Asia—possibly China, Korea, or Russia. Also inside the house were found the remains of obsidian artifacts, which have a chemical signature that indicates the obsidian is from the Anadyr River valley in Russia.

Pre-Columbian contact between Alaska and Kamchatka via the subarctic Aleutian Islands would have been conceivable, but the two settlement waves on this archipelago started on the American side and its western continuation, the Commander Islands, remained uninhabited until after Russian explorers encountered the Aleut people in 1741. There is no genetic or linguistic evidence for earlier contact along this route. The Asian war bow appears to have been introduced to North America in the 7th century via the Bering Strait, as well as laminar armour in the 9th century.

In June 2016, Purdue University published the results of research on six metal and composite metal artifacts excavated from a late prehistoric archaeological context at Cape Espenberg on the northern coast of the Seward Peninsula in Alaska. Also part of the team were researchers from the University of Georgia and the University of Pennsylvania. The report is the first evidence that metal from Asia reached prehistoric North America before the contact with Europeans, stating that X-ray fluorescence identified two of these artifacts as smelted industrial alloys with large proportions of tin and lead. The presence of smelted alloys in a prehistoric Inuit context in northwest Alaska was demonstrated for the first time and indicated the movement of Eurasian metal across the Bering Strait into North America before sustained contact with Europeans.

We believe these smelted alloys were made somewhere in Eurasia and traded to Siberia and then traded across the Bering Strait to ancestral Inuits [sic] people, also known as Thule culture, in Alaska. [...] Two of the Cape Espenberg items that were found – a bead and a buckle — are heavily leaded bronze artifacts. Both are from a house at the site dating to the Late Prehistoric Period, around 1100-1300 AD [...] The belt buckle also is considered an industrial product and is an unprecedented find for this time. It resembles a buckle used as part of a horse harness that would have been used in north-central China during the first six centuries before the Common Era.

— H. Kory Cooper, Purdue.

== Venetian glass ==
In February 2021, a controversial study claimed that Venetian glass trade beads had been found at three prehistoric Inuit sites in Alaska. The authors believe the beads were transported from Venice, Italy, across Eurasia and over the Bering Strait, making this discovery "the first documented instance of the presence of indubitable European materials in prehistoric sites in the western hemisphere as the result of overland transport across the Eurasian continent." After radiocarbon dating materials found near the beads, archaeologists estimated their arrival on the continent to sometime between 1440 and 1480, predating Christopher Columbus. The dating and provenance has been challenged by other researchers who point out that such beads were not made in Venice until the mid-16th century and that an early 17th century French origin is possible.

== See also ==
- Bering Strait crossing
- Beringia
