= Mount Aniakchak =

Caldera in Alaska

Aniakchak Caldera
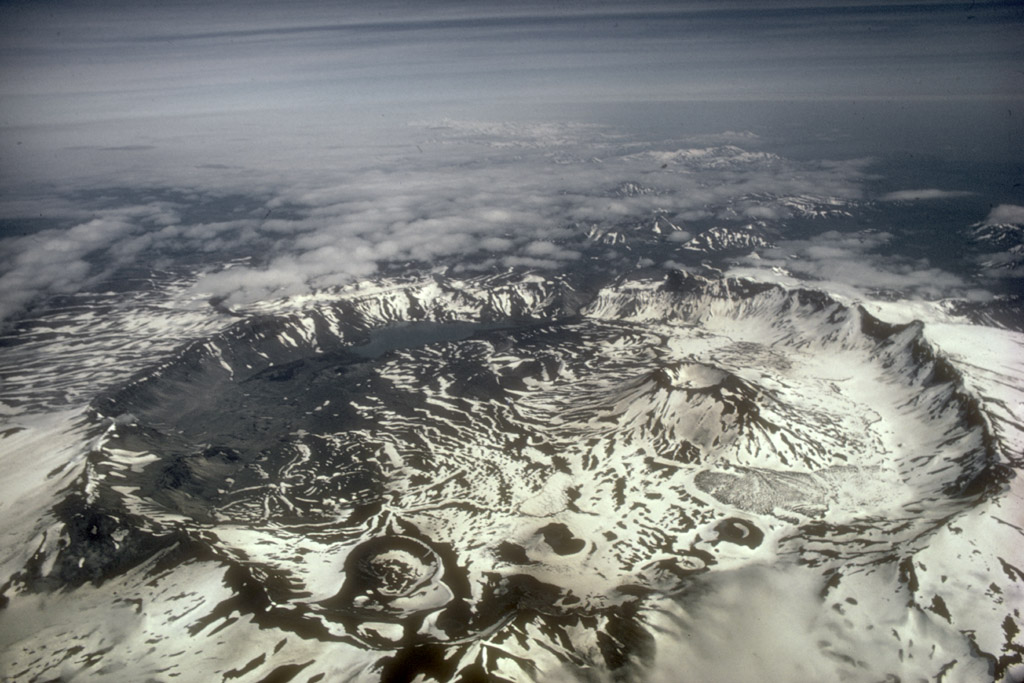
- Mount Aniakchak caldera

Highest point
- Elevation: 1,341 m (4,400 ft)
- Coordinates: 56.88°N 158.15°W

Geography
- Location within Alaska
- Location: Aniakchak National Monument and Preserve, Alaska, US
- Parent range: Aleutian Range
- Topo map: USGS Chignik D-1

Geology
- Formed by: Subduction zone volcanism
- Mountain type: Caldera (Stratovolcano)
- Volcanic arc: Aleutian Arc
- Last eruption: May to June 1931

U.S. National Natural Landmark
- Designated: November 1967

Mount Aniakchak (Russian: Аниакчак) is a volcano on the western Alaska Peninsula. Part of the Aleutian Volcanic Arc, it was formed by the subduction of the oceanic Pacific Plate under the North American Plate. Aniakchak is a 10 kilometers (6.2 mi) wide caldera with a break to the northeast. The caldera contains Surprise Lake and many volcanic cones, maars and craters, including Vent Mountain. The volcano has erupted mainly calc-alkaline rocks ranging from basalt to rhyolite.

Activity began in the Pleistocene. Aniakchak is one of the most active volcanoes in Alaska and underwent several significant caldera-forming eruptions. The largest eruption is known as Aniakchak II and took place in 1628/1627 BCE. During this eruption, pyroclastic flows swept all the flanks of the volcano and caused a tsunami in Bristol Bay. Tephra from the eruption rained down over Alaska, with noticeable deposits being left as far as northern Europe. The eruption depopulated the central Alaska Peninsula and caused cultural changes in Alaska. Together with other volcanic eruptions at that time, Aniakchak II may have caused climatic anomalies. The present-day caldera formed during this eruption. A lake formed in the caldera, which drained in one of the largest known floods of the Holocene. Many lava domes and cones were emplaced within the caldera after the Aniakchak II eruption, with some events depositing ash over Alaska.

The last eruption took place in 1931. It was intense, forming a new crater in the caldera and causing ash fallout over numerous towns in Alaska. The volcano is monitored by the Alaska Volcano Observatory (AVO). The area around the volcano is the Aniakchak National Monument and Preserve, maintained by the National Park Service.

== Geography and geomorphology ==
Aniakchak is about 670 kilometers (420 mi) southwest from Anchorage, Alaska, within the Aniakchak National Monument and Preserve (Bristol Bay Borough) on the Alaska Peninsula between Bristol Bay (Bering Sea) and the Pacific Ocean. Port Heiden is 25 kilometers (16 mi) west from the volcano, other towns within 100 kilometers (62 mi) from Aniakchak are Chignik Lake, Chignik, Chignik Lagoon, Pilot Point and Ugashik.

Aniakchak 3D

The volcano is a 10 kilometers (6.2 mi) wide and 500–1,000 meters (1,600–3,300 ft) deep caldera, formally named Aniakchak Crater. It is surrounded by gently sloping terrain (Note: The landscape is full of lakes except directly north of Aniakchak, probably due to the lakes being filled and obliterated by its volcanic activity) between the Aleutian Range to the southwest and Bristol Bay to the northeast. The Aleutian Range is not high but its mountains rise directly from the sea. Outside of the caldera the volcano is notably asymmetric, with the northwestern side having a less eroded appearance than the southeastern. The highest point of the rim is the 1,341 meters (4,400 ft) high Aniakchak Peak on the southern caldera rim. A 200 meters (660 ft) deep prominent v-shaped gap in the northeastern caldera rim is known as The Gates. Steep walls cut into fossil-bearing nonvolcanic rocks, with only the top 500 meters (1,600 ft) of the cut rock being part of the actual Aniakchak volcano. Outcrops in The Gates bear traces of hydrothermal weathering. There is a single report of volcanic caves at Aniakchak.

A number of secondary cones, lava domes, maars and tuff cones dot the caldera floor, the largest is the 2.5 kilometers (1.6 mi) wide and 500 meters (1,600 ft)-1 kilometer (0.62 mi) high Vent Mountain (Note: Formal name) just south of the caldera centre. Other craters are the semicircular Half Cone (Note: Formal name) in the northwestern, the 1 kilometer (0.62 mi) wide 1931 Main Crater and West Dome in the western, Slag Heap and Doublet Crater in the western-southwestern, New Cone, Breezy Cone, Windy Cone and two water-filled maars in the southeastern, and Surprise Cone, Bolshoi Dome, Vulcan Dome and Pumice Dome in the eastern sectors of the caldera.

Milky-green Surprise Lake (Note: Formal name) has an area of 2.75 square kilometers (1.06 sq mi) and abuts the inner northeastern margin of the caldera. Its water is about 19.5 meters (64 ft) deep and originates from various hot springs, cold springs and meltwater. Lake waters are continually mixed by strong winds. Hydrothermal inputs give the lake its color. The lake, which formed behind the deltas of several creeks, drains through The Gates valley at 335 meters (1,099 ft) elevation above sea level in the eastern caldera rim, the only outlet of the caldera. The outlet forms the Aniakchak River, a National Wild and Scenic River flowing to the Pacific Ocean. In 2010, one of the maars in the caldera broke out, causing a flood in the Aniakchak River. Meshik Lake is south of the caldera. The Meshik and Cinder Rivers drain the rest of the volcanic edifice, to Bristol Bay. A 1 square kilometer (0.39 sq mi) debris-covered glacier is in the southern sector of the caldera and has emplaced moraines. Other small glaciers have developed on Aniakchak Peak and Vent Mountain. Landslides have affected the eastern walls of the caldera.

== Geology ==
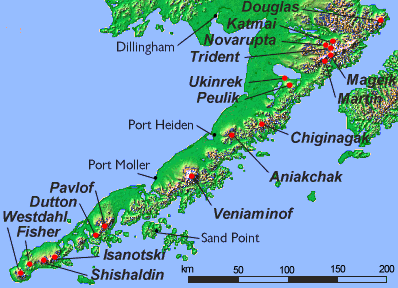
Neighboring volcanoes

Southwest of Aniakchak, the Pacific Plate subducts beneath the North America Plate (Note: Or rather, the Bering Block) at a rate of about 65 millimeters per year (2.6 in/year). This subduction is responsible for the activity of the 4,000 kilometers (2,500 mi) long Aleutian Volcanic Arc. It extends from Kamchatka across the Aleutian Islands to Alaska and features more than forty active volcanoes. It is one of the most active volcanic arcs in the world, with multiple eruptions each year. The Aleutian Volcanic Arc is part of the wider Pacific Ring of Fire and began erupting during the Tertiary period. Volcanoes close to Aniakchak include Yantarni to the east, Black Peak and Veniaminof to the southwest; Black Peak has emplaced ash layers on Aniakchak. The segment of the Aleutian Volcanic Arc from the central Aleutian Islands to the western Alaska Peninsula, which includes Aniakchak, features some of the largest volcanoes of the arc. The arc is split by a tectonic discontinuity at the longitude of Aniakchak; east of this discontinuity earthquake activity differs and the arc begins to turn clockwise. Seismic tomography has found evidence that here the boundary between the Pacific Plate and the former Kula Plate was subducted, forming a slab window; the high activity of Aniakchak and neighbouring Veniaminof might be facilitated by magma upwelling in this slab window and its accumulation in the crustal discontinuity.

The volcano grew on a westward-sloping basement formed by Mesozoic-Tertiary sedimentary rocks, which crops out south of the volcano and within the caldera. Chronologically, they are part of the Jurassic Naknek, Cretaceous Staniukovich, Cretaceous Chignik, Paleocene-Eocene Tolstoi, and Eocene-Oligocene Meshik Formations. The crust is mostly andesitic. The Alaska-Aleutian Batholith may extend under the volcano. An aeromagnetic anomaly overlies Aniakchak; similar anomalies are found on neighboring volcanoes but also on much older plutonic complexes in the region.

During the Last Glacial Maximum more than 11,700 years ago, the region was covered by ice. When the glaciers retreated at the end of the ice age, they left numerous elongated moraines, U-shaped valleys, and various kinds of lakes (including kettle lakes and proglacial lakes). Two separate glaciations have been defined at Aniakchak.

=== Composition ===
Aniakchak has erupted rocks ranging from basalt to rhyolite, which define a calc-alkaline (Note: Between 450,000–240,000 years ago, Aniakchak also erupted tholeiitic rocks) rock suite typical for volcanic arc rocks. Phenocrysts are rare, they include amphibole, augite, clinopyroxene, hornblende, hypersthene, ilmenite, iron sulfide, magnetite, olivine, orthopyroxene, plagioclase and quartz, depending on the rock unit. Temperatures of 870–900 °C (1,600–1,650 °F) have been inferred for dacitic magmas in the Aniakchak II eruption; the temperature of the andesite is unknown.

None of the Aniakchak volcanic rocks are derived directly from the mantle. Rather, mantle-derived basaltic melts, enriched by fluids produced during subduction, ascend into the crust into a "mush"-like region above 15 kilometers (9.3 mi) depth at Aniakchak. They receive a contribution from subducted sediments. Magmas differentiate within this mush region at low pressures and high temperatures, where fractional crystallization and melting of crustal rocks modify their chemistry. The rhyodacitic and rhyolitic rocks form in such mush regions. Separate magma bodies can form and absorb melts from surrounding rock. Part of the mush region was emptied during the Aniakchak II eruption. After the caldera-forming eruptions, fractional crystallization of newly arrived andesitic magmas yielded the silicic magmas erupted later.

== Climate, fauna and vegetation ==
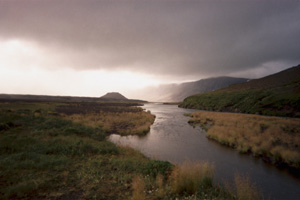
Landscape inside the caldera

The climate east of the Aleutian Range is wet and mild, while west of the mountains, there is less precipitation and higher temperature variation. The closest weather stations to Aniakchak are at Kodiak and Cold Bay, close to sea level. They show mean annual temperatures of 3–5 °C (37–41 °F) and mean annual precipitation reaching 870–1,380 millimeters (34–54 in).

The main vegetation in the region is tundra. It consists of ericaceous heath, forbs, lichens, mosses and shrubs. Meadows grow on mountain ridges and in moist valleys; the latter include wetlands formed by forbs, grasses and sedges The cinder and ash cones are sparsely covered with grasses, forbs and lichens, while meadows and herbs cover the caldera floor. Some ash-covered terrain is barren of vegetation, but features wind-blown dunes.

Kodiak bears, foxes and caribou populate the region, while Alaska blackfish, Chinook salmon, chum salmon, coastrange sculpin, Coho salmon, Dolly Varden trout, ninespine stickleback, Pacific staghorn sculpin, pink salmon, rainbow trout, sockeye salmon, starry flounder and threespine stickleback occur in the rivers, including Aniakchak River. Sockeye salmons and Dolly Varden trouts occur in Surprise Lake, and a population of less than 20,000 salmon spawns there. The salmon arrived in Surprise Lake after it overflowed the caldera rim and connected with the ocean, and since then evolved into two distinct populations that reproduce in different parts of Surprise Lake. Some of these fish species migrate between the sea and the rivers; they provide nutrients to waterbodies they ascend into and are economically important.

== Human history, name and use ==
The Alaskan Peninsula was settled about 7,000 years ago by people who practiced hunter-gatherer lifestyles. After being driven away by the Aniakchak II eruption and eruptions of neighboring volcanoes, humans resettled the region beginning 1,600 years ago, building numerous villages. The central Alaskan Peninsula is inhabited by the Alutiiq people. Beginning in 1741, Russians and later Americans visited the region and left their cultural imprint on the native population.

The volcano was discovered in 1922 and originally named "Old Crater"; "Aniakshak" is a misspelling. The name "Aniakchak" is probably Alutiiq and may be related to the Yupik word anyaraq which means "the way to go out". It was deemed a National Natural Landmark in 1967 and became part of the Aniakchak National Monument and Preserve in 1980 after the passage of the Alaska National Interest Lands Conservation Act. Owing to its remote location and hostile climate, Aniakchak is rarely visited; on average there are fewer than 300 visitors every year, making it the perhaps least visited national park in the NPS system. The area is noted for dinosaur fossils, including fossilized footprints, recovered from the Chignik Formation. They have provided insights into the ancient environment. Recreational activities include backpacking, camping, fishing, hunting, and rafting. There are seasonal hunting and fishing lodges around Aniakchak, but otherwise there is little infrastructure. Access is mostly by boat plane to Surprise Lake.

== Eruption history ==
Aniakchak began erupting at least 850,000 years ago. Two stages of early activity (850,000–550,000 and 440,000–10,000 years ago) built a composite volcano formed by lava flows and rock fragments produced by a central vent. Tephra layers on St. Michael Island imply that Aniakchak erupted 15,505 ± 312 years ago, but any evidence close to the volcano has been erased by erosion. At the end of the Pleistocene, Aniakchak was a glacially eroded mountain with its summit south of the present-day caldera. An ancestral caldera may have been the source of a significant glacier in the Birthday Creek drainage, but if such a caldera formed, its explosive activity left no traces.

At least forty eruptions took place during the Holocene, half before and half after the second caldera-forming eruption, equivalent to one eruption every 340 years after the second caldera-forming event. This rate is the highest of all volcanoes in the eastern Aleutian volcanic arc. Most Holocene eruptions have not produced known tephra deposits. There is evidence that after several eruptions, humans abandoned sites close to the volcano. Lava flows were emplaced on the northern flank of the volcano.

Three major eruptions took place during the Holocene: The Aniakchak I, Black Nose Pumice, and Aniakchak II eruptions. The Aniakchak I eruption took place 9,500–7,500 years ago, and emplaced volcanic bombs and ignimbrites on the volcano and in surrounding valleys. They are similar in appearance and chemistry to the Aniakchak II deposits, but can be distinguished with the help of trace element data. A tephra layer in central Alaska has been attributed to the Aniakchak I eruption. How the volcano appeared after the Aniakchak I eruption is unclear; conceivably, either a small caldera formed or the caldera rapidly filled with ice. The so-called Black Nose Pumice was emplaced 7,000 years ago during several closely spaced Plinian eruptions and consists of two pumice fallout layers, separated by an ignimbrite. It is partly eroded or buried by products of the Aniakchak II eruption. A tephra layer in Southeastern Alaska was attributed to an unidentified eruption of Aniakchak 5,300–5,030 years before present, but may have originated at Mount Edgecumbe instead. Shortly before the Aniakchak II event, a smaller eruption may have emplaced a tephra layer in the Brooks Range of northern Alaska.

Other large caldera-forming eruptions in Alaska took place at Mount Okmok, Fisher Caldera, and Veniaminof, with lesser events at Kaguyak and Black Peak. Unlike them, before the caldera-forming eruption, Aniakchak was a small volcanic edifice.

=== Aniakchak II eruption ===
Various dating methods, mostly relying on radiocarbon, have yielded ages of around 3,000–4,000 years for the eruption. Owing to the multitude of methods, the dates span a wide range, but consensus has developed around a 1628/1627 BCE date derived from ice cores. Other Alaskan volcanoes erupting around that time are Veniaminof and Hayes. Numerous scientific efforts, investigating caldera formation in the Aleutian Volcanic Arc and geology, geophysics, petrology and volcanology, have been carried out on the Aniakchak II eruption, and the caldera has been compared to Ceraunius Tholus on Mars.

Before the eruption, Aniakchak was a 2,300 meters (7,500 ft) high deeply eroded stratovolcano with two separate magma bodies, one andesitic and the other rhyodacitic, under Aniakchak at least 4.1–5.5 kilometers (2.5–3.4 mi) in depth. These two magma bodies had evolved independently in the time before the eruption. Triggered either by the failure of the magma chamber roof or by an earthquake, one of the two magma bodies leaked into the other. At least ten smaller explosive eruptions occurred before the climactic event, which probably occurred during summer. A more than 25 kilometers (16 mi) high eruption column rose over the volcano and produced a lapilli and volcanic ash fallout. Data from ice cores imply that there may have been more than one explosion, with a larger initial event followed by a lesser one. The column then collapsed, and highly mobile pyroclastic flows consisting of andesite and rhyodacite swept the volcano, filling in valleys, making turns and moving upslope over topography. They had sufficient speed to cross 700 meters (2,300 ft) high topography 20 kilometers (12 mi) away from the vent. During the initial stages of the eruption, a topographic barrier may have existed on the southeastern side of Aniakchak. The flows buried a surface of about 2,500 square kilometers (970 sq mi), running over distances exceeding 60 kilometers (37 mi) to Bristol Bay and the Pacific Ocean. When they plunged into the sea, the flows triggered up to 7.8 meters (26 ft) high tsunamis on the northern shore of Bristol Bay. It is possible that there was a strait connecting the Pacific Ocean and Bristol Bay before the eruption, where the Meshik River exists today, and this was filled in by rocks during the Aniakchak II eruption. The volcano collapsed like a piston, forming the caldera. Landslides on its inner walls enlarged the caldera depression. The eruption evacuated the magmatic system of Aniakchak, and subsequent eruptions had a different chemistry.

The Aniakchak II eruption is the largest known eruption at Aniakchak, and one of the largest Holocene eruptions in North America, comparable with the 1912 Katmai and early Holocene Mount Mazama events. A volcanic explosivity index of 6 or 7 has been assigned (Note: The former size estimate would make it comparable to the 1991 eruption of Mount Pinatubo, the latter with eruptions like Kurile Lake, Kikai, 1815 eruption of Mount Tambora and 1257 Samalas eruption and make Aniakchak one of the largest Holocene eruptions in the world.) to the eruption. It yielded more than 50 cubic kilometers (12 cu mi) in rock (pyroclastic flows and tephra), and total tephra volume may have reached 114 cubic kilometers (27 cu mi). The initial stage of the eruption produced rhyodacitic rocks, then both andesite and rhyodacite erupted, and at the end it was andesitic. The pyroclastic flow deposits are rich in pumice and scoria and mostly unwelded. They reach thicknesses exceeding 100 meters (330 ft) where they ponded against pre-existing topography.

The eruption produced more than 100 cubic kilometers (24 cu mi) tephra, which fell out north of the volcano in an elongated area extending across western Alaska, including the Alaska Peninsula, Bristol Bay, the Kuskokwim and Yukon River Deltas, Norton Sound and the Seward Peninsula. Tephra thickness decreases from 1 meter (3 ft 3 in) 300 kilometers (190 mi) from the vent to 1 centimeter (0.39 in) 1,500 kilometers (930 mi) from the vent. (Note: The Aniakchak II eruption was once considered a possible source of the "Cantwell Ash" in central Alaska but is today attributed to the Hayes volcano) The Aniakchak II tephra is one of the most significant tephras of the Northwest Pacific region and has been used as a stratigraphic marker owing to widespread, pristine appearance and characteristic color.

Tephra has been found at Chignik Bay, in the Ahklun Mountains, Zagoskin Lake on St. Michael Island, Lake Hill on St. Paul Island, Cape Espenberg and Whitefish Lake on the Seward Peninsula (western Alaska), lakes in the Alaskan Brooks Range, the Mount Logan icefield at the Alaska-Canada border, and the Bering and Chukchi Seas northwest of Alaska. Thinner tephra has been recovered more than 4,500 kilometers (2,800 mi) from the volcano, in numerous ice cores of Greenland, in Nordan's Pond on Newfoundland, in marine sediment cores east of Greenland, in sediments from Northern Ireland and Wales in the British Isles, and in Finland. The Aniakchak tephra has been used to date sediments and scientific findings between Greenland, Canada and the Chukchi Sea.

==== Impacts on humans and the environment ====
Vegetation and human populations on the Alaska Peninsula were devastated by the eruption. The pyroclastic flows would have killed everything in their path and buried the remains. The landscape remained unvegetated for more than a millennium. Together with eruptions of neighboring Black Peak and Veniaminof, the Aniakchak II eruption might have depopulated part of the area around Aniakchak. Earthquakes might have alerted inhabitants of the impending catastrophe but they may not have had time to escape to safe distance. The resulting gap in settlement between the eastern and western parts of the Alaska Peninsula may explain why the Alutiiq people and Aleut people are separate. Areas close to the volcano remained uninhabited for more than two millennia, and it is possible that the Brooks River Archeological District on the northern Alaska Peninsula became the destination of survivors. Over Alaska and Beringia, it is conceivable that the eruption forced humans to rely more on marine resources and thus prompted the archaeological transition from the Arctic small tool tradition to the Norton tradition and human migration to coastal sites. In Central Alaska, a decline in human activity 3,500 years ago may have been a consequence of volcanic eruptions like Aniakchak II and the "Jarvis Creek" event of Hayes volcano. The eruption caused a decline in caribou populations of the western Arctic. There is evidence that peat accumulation at Cape Espenberg was interrupted by the eruption, and vegetation growth was slow for up to a century at 1,100 kilometers (680 mi) from the volcano.

The Aniakchak II eruption took place during the 17th century BCE, an era with numerous volcanic eruptions; other volcanoes that erupted at that time are Mount St. Helens, Vesuvius and in particular the Minoan eruption of Santorini and separating their dates and respective influences is difficult. The eruptions caused a volcanic winter at a time when global climate was undergoing a cooling resembling the Little Ice Age, leading to a climate transition around the Mediterranean. Several cultural changes, such as the end of the Arctic Nordic Stone Age and the westward spread of the Seima-Turbino culture in western Eurasia, have been linked to the Aniakchak II eruption, although a direct causal link is unproven.

A sulfur yield of 32 ± 11 teragrams has been reconstructed, making Aniakchak II one of the largest sulfur-producing volcanic eruptions of the late Holocene. Babylonians observing Venus during the reign of King Ammi-Saduqa reported a haze which may have been from the Aniakchak eruption.

=== Intracaldera lake ===
Within a few decades, the caldera filled with water until more than half of the caldera floor was submerged. Water levels may have reached 490 meters (1,610 ft) or 610 meters (2,000 ft) elevation; a wave-cut terrace is found at the former altitude, but the appearance of the lava domes implies a higher water level. (Note: In the latter case, the lake would have been at least 400 meters (1,300 ft) deep, with a surface area of about 38 square kilometers (15 sq mi) and water volume of 3.7 cubic kilometers (0.89 cu mi).) Lake sediments built up in numerous places inside the caldera. Water eventually overflowed a stable sill, thus establishing a constant water level.

About 1,860 years before present, it drained catastrophically through a notch in the northeastern rim, forming The Gates gorge, in one of the largest known floods (Note: Sometimes it is stated to be the largest, but the Mount Okmok outburst flood reached a higher discharge of 1,900,000 cubic meters per second (67,000,000 cu ft/s)-2,000,000 cubic meters per second (71,000,000 cu ft/s); this may be one of the largest floods of the Holocene. The other known floods exceeding the Aniakchak flood are the largest Missoula Flood, the Altai floods and a flood at Nevado de Colima in Mexico.) (peak discharge of 1,100,000 cubic meters per second (39,000,000 cu ft/s)) of the Holocene. The overflow was caused either by headward erosion of a river outside the caldera, capturing it, or a consequence of eruptions that stirred the lake and formed waves which overtopped its rim. The resulting flood scoured the river valley, forming a scabland, and deposited gravel bars, a large alluvial fan at the outlet and numerous boulders with sizes of up to 27 meters (89 ft) along the Aniakchak River. The flood destroyed a village on Aniakchak Bay at the Pacific coast, 40 kilometers (25 mi) from the volcano. It appears to have displaced humans from the mouth of the Aniakchak River, where a two-century hiatus in human occupation has been recognized. The lake did not drain entirely during this flood, with a significant water body remaining inside the caldera that left a terrace 82 meters (269 ft) above the present-day Surprise Lake. The subaqueous eruptions and the abrupt emptying of the lake have drawn scientific interest, and the breakout flood has been compared to similar floods at other volcanoes like Lake Taupō, Lake Tarawera (both New Zealand), Mount Okmok (Alaska) and Ksudach (Russia), and crater breakout floods on Mars.

=== Post-caldera volcanism ===
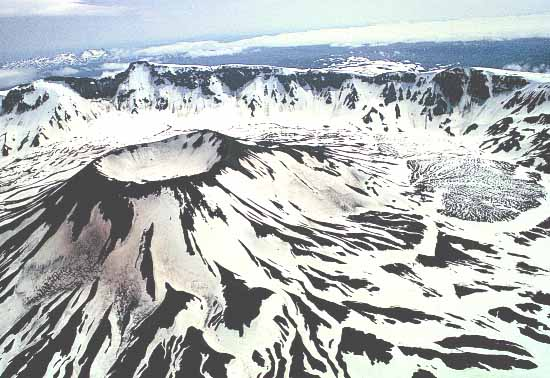
Vent Mountain at Aniakchak

Post-caldera activity was in roughly equal degrees explosive and effusive; many eruptions were both. Nine separate structures were emplaced in the caldera, partly in or under the lake. Half Cone and Vent Mountain were the site of multiple eruptions. Most of the vents are located at the caldera margin, probably along a ring fracture on the caldera floor. A first (Note: Whether a 3,100 years old tephra from Aniakchak was actually produced in an eruption 3,100 years ago or is simply a reworked Aniakchak II tephra is unclear) post-caldera explosive eruption occurred 2,300 years ago. Afterwards, several undated lava domes (Bolshoi Dome, Pumice Dome, West Dome, and Vulcan Dome) were emplaced in the caldera lake. The Pumice Dome eruption crossed the caldera rim to produce a 3 kilometers (1.9 mi) long lava flow outside the caldera. Distal andesitic tephras found in Greenland ice strata provide possible evidence of two unidentified explosive Aniakchak eruptions, one in 88 CE and another in 536 CE, and tephra of this time may extend to Finland. About 900 ± 80 years ago, Surprise Cone was emplaced inside the remnant caldera lake. Conceivably, its eruption and that of the other tuff cones was triggered by the drainage of the caldera lake, which depressurized the magma system. Half Cone erupted 840 ± 30 and 570 ± 40 years ago and activity alternated between Vent Mountain and Half Cone. Vent Mountain emplaced lava flows and tephra on the caldera floor. One pyroclastic flow crossed the northern caldera rim. The post-caldera activity has resulted in widespread ashfall over southwestern Alaska and the Alaskan Peninsula.

The largest post-caldera eruption at Aniakchak took place 400 years ago. It had a volcanic explosivity index of 3–4, destroying Half Cone in a series of Plinian eruptions and emplacing the Cobweb lava flow. Pyroclastic flows and ash fallout reached thicknesses of 40 meters (130 ft), with ash falling 330 kilometers (210 mi) away in north-northeastern direction. The layered eruption deposits crop out in Half Cone. Inflow of new magma and crystallization of old magma probably triggered the eruption, increasing the pressure in the magmatic system until magma began to propagate to the surface. During the course of the eruption, magma composition changed from dacite to basaltic andesite, a typical phenomenon at Alaskan volcanoes and other eruptions of Aniakchak; however, the distinction between the "pink" and "brown" pumices is not due to this compositional gap. Another eruption may have occurred at the same time on Vent Mountain, and a tephra in Skilak Lake may also come from this eruption. Plummer et al. 2012 suggested this eruption as the 1453 mystery eruption. In 2024, the date 1600 was proposed, as well as a link to tephra and sulfate deposits in Greenland and climatic anomalies in that year (compounding these caused by Huaynaputina). There may or may not have been another eruption before the 1931 event.

==== 1931 eruption ====
The last eruption (Note: Reports of an eruption in 1942 are uncertain, and the 25 June 1951 eruption is discredited) began on 1 May 1931. Initially, white clouds rose over the volcano at 10:00 am 1 May, followed by ash at 12:00 pm. Intense explosions occurred that day and on the 11 and 20 May, accompanied by sounds of explosions. The eruption was observed by Jesuit priest and geologist Bernard R. Hubbard, who visited the caldera after the eruption, making this eruption well-documented. It was both explosive and effusive: Explosions at the 1931 Main Crater produced tephra fallout, reaching thicknesses of 40 meters (130 ft) mostly to the northwest. Lava flows issued from Doublet Crater, Main Crater and Slag Heap and filled the bottom of the Main Crater. Volcanic lightning was reported during the eruption. Ash fell in various communities, including Chignik, Kanakanak, Katmai National Park, Kodiak Island, Nushagak Peninsula, Port Heiden, (Note: The town was named Meshik at that time) and Holy Cross 600 kilometers (370 mi) north of the volcano. The ash clouds were thick enough to plunge the land into darkness, and there were widespread problems with radio communications. Ash has been recovered from ice cores in the Saint Elias Mountains of Yukon, Canada. In June, the new vents were still emitting volcanic gases with a smell of sulfur, and Surprise Lake and Aniakchak River were discolored. Lava stopped flowing in July.

According to Hubbard, the pre-eruption caldera was a "wonderland" with plants and springs, while describing the post-eruption caldera as "an abomination of desolation" and comparing it to the Moon. The eruption sterilized much of the caldera and killed numerous animals, with Hubbard noting dead birds in the caldera, and ash ingestion resulted in numerous casualties among caribou and reindeer.

The total volume of rock reached 0.9 cubic kilometers (0.22 cu mi), making this eruption one of the largest eruptions in Alaska during the 20th century. It consists of three separate tephra units formed by various ash-to-lapilli sized rocks and three lava flows consisting of trachydacite, basaltic andesite and andesite. Several different sources of magma contributed to this eruption, and a few centuries before the eruption new basaltic melts had entered the system. Magma ascended along ring faults on the caldera floor. The eruption was initially magmatic, then became phreatomagmatic when decreasing magma ascent speed allowed water from the lakes in the caldera to flow into the vent. Later, water inflow lessened, and activity returned to magmatic. The magmas became more mafic and less viscous over the course of the eruption, causing a transition to Strombolian eruptions.

=== Present-day status ===
Aniakchak is dormant, with occasional seismic activity (Note: The volcano is known for producing bogus seismic signals during bad weather) clustered at shallow depths under the caldera. Satellite imagery has noted ongoing sinking of the caldera floor, with the rate (a few millimeters per year) decreasing over time. The subsidence may be due to the degassing and cooling of magma under the volcano. The magmatic system under Aniakchak is still active. Sometimes volcanic ash is blown away by wind, forming visible clouds that extend outside the crater.

There are active fumaroles and hot springs in the caldera, mostly around the 1931 vents and along Surprise Lake respectively. Water temperatures in the hot springs reach 21–25 °C (70–77 °F). Helium and carbon dioxide emissions have been noted from a spring next to Surprise Lake. The magma chamber of Aniakchak is estimated to hold about 129×10^{18} calories (5.4×10^{20} J) of heat.

== Hazards and monitoring ==
The volcano is classified as a "high-threat volcano" (Note: "High threat" is the second-highest in a five-class scale, which considers both the threat posed by a volcano and the infrastructure/population/other human uses at risk) by the United States Geological Service. Future eruptions will most likely occur within the caldera, in particular its southwestern sector. Explosive eruptions may occur if the magma is volatile-rich or it interacts with water inside the caldera. Degassed magma would produce lava flows. Large caldera-forming eruptions are improbable in the near future, as there does not seem to be a large contiguous magma body under Aniakchak.

Specific hazards include: The main danger from future activity at Aniakchak is high ash clouds. Aircraft flying into volcanic ash clouds can suffer engine failures, and Aniakchak is located beneath one of the major air routes of the North Pacific. Precipitating volcanic ash can smother plants and make roads slippery, irritate eyes and lungs, and damage machinery. Ashfall would most likely occur north to east of the volcano but can occur in any direction Pyroclastic flows and pyroclastic surges are fast-flowing avalanches/clouds of hot rock. Owing to their enormous speed and high temperature, they tend to kill everything in their path. Future eruptions would most likely create such flows within the caldera, but only larger events would pose a threat outside of it. Lava domes and lava flows can be extruded within the caldera. They are slow, but steam explosions or pyroclastic flows caused by collapses of lava domes can amplify their threat. Snow and ice within the caldera – and during larger eruptions, outside – can melt when impacted by the fallout of hot rocks. The loose volcanic ash on the slopes of Aniakchak can be liquefied by rainfall. Either can produce mudflows, which threaten valleys running from the caldera. While the hot springs and fumaroles are not a threat by themselves, in case of the ascent of new magma, temperatures and carbon dioxide concentrations may rise to dangerous levels. The vents can eject volcanic bombs, large blocks that fall down close to the vent. Landslides or subaqueous explosions can cause floods or local tsunamis from the lakes in the caldera. Hazards exist mainly within the caldera.

Aniakchak is monitored by the Alaska Volcano Observatory since 1997 through seismometers and satellite images, and collects reports from visitors to the caldera and aircraft to detect renewed activity. The observatory publishes a volcano hazard level; in case of an eruption, it would coordinate with government agencies and publish updates through the Internet and other means.

== See also ==
- List of National Natural Landmarks
- List of volcanoes in the United States
