= Espenberg, Alaska =

Espenberg Iñuiġniq
- Unincorporated community
- Location within the state of Alaska
- Coordinates: 66°35′34″N 163°57′53″W
- Country: United States
- State: Alaska
- Borough: Northwest Arctic
- Elevation: 13 ft (4 m)
- Time zone: UTC-9 (Alaska (AKST))
  - Summer (DST): UTC-8 (AKDT)
- GNIS feature ID: 1412994

Espenberg (Iñupiaq: Iñuiġniq) is a settlement in the U.S. state of Alaska, located 50 mi (80 km) northwest of Deering on the Seward Peninsula at the mouth of the Espenberg River by the Chukchi Sea. It lies within the Northwest Arctic Borough, consisting of a site with five or six buildings. The name is derived from nearby Cape Espenberg.
