= Devil Mountain (Alaska) =

Mountain in Alaska, United States

- Location within Alaska

Highest point
- Elevation: 794 ft (242 m)
- Coordinates: 66°17′45″N 164°31′28″W

Geology
- Mountain type: Shield volcano
- Volcanic field: Espenberg volcanic field
- Last eruption: Pleistocene

Devil Mountain (Iñupiaq: Iġġiasaaq) is a small shield volcano in the U.S. state of Alaska, located 5 mi (8.0 km) south of the Devil Mountain Lakes and 53 mi (85 km) northwest of Deering. It has an elevation of 794 ft (242 m) or 797 ft (243 m).

The mountain is part of the Espenberg volcanic field, a group of Pleistocene maars and shield volcanoes at the northern tip of the Seward Peninsula just south of the Arctic Circle.

Devil Mountain was named Teufelsberg by Lieutenant Otto von Kotzebue in 1816, which means Devils Mountain in the German language.
