= Devil Mountain Lakes =

Lake in the state of Alaska, United States

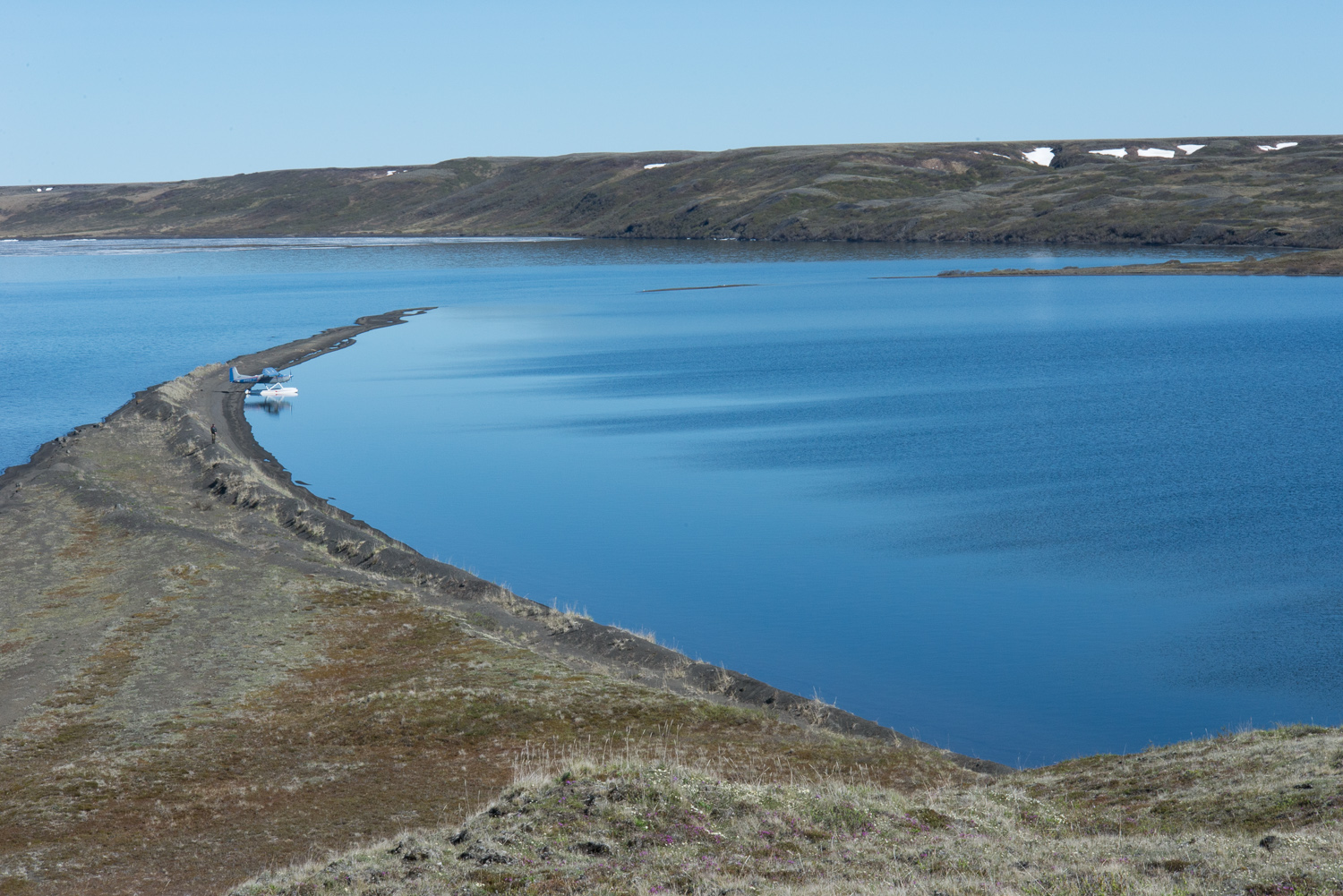
The Devil Mountain Lakes are the largest Maar lakes in the world.

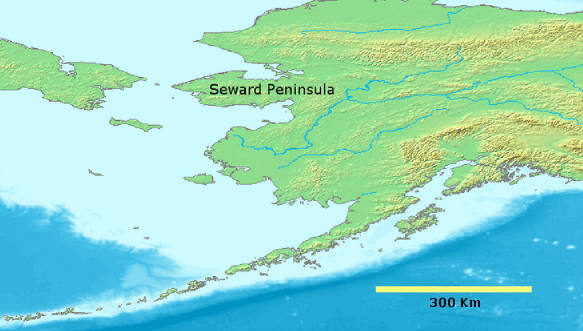
Seward Peninsula with Devil Mountain Lakes at the top

Devil Mountain Lakes (Inupiaq: Qitiqłiik) is a maar (a form of crater lake) in the western part of Alaska. The lake is considered to be the largest maar in the world; it is part of the Espenberg volcanic field.

== Geography ==
Devil Mountain Lakes is located about 100 km (62 mi) southwest of Kotzebue on the northern part of the Seward Peninsula. The coordinates are 66°23′41″N 164°29′18″W.

The crater lake has a diameter of about 8 kilometers (5.0 mi); it is part of the Bering Land Bridge National Preserve. It consists of two connected craters, North Devil Mountain Lake with a diameter of about 5.1 km (3.2 mi), and South Devil Mountain Lake with a diameter of about 3.4 km (2.1 mi).

There are several nearby maars, such as the Killeak Lakes (North Killeak maar and South Killeak maar) and White Fish Lake (Whitefish Maar). The area is sometimes also called Espenberg Maars.

== History ==
The lake was probably shaped during volcanic eruptions about 21,000 years ago during the Pleistocene Ice Age as lava flows came through the permafrost creating violent underground explosions.

On December 1, 1978, the nature reserve was established as "Bering Land Bridge National Monument"; on December 2, 1980, its name was changed to "Bering Land Bridge National Preserve".

== See also ==
- Devil Mountain
