= Aniakchak National Monument and Preserve =

Region of Alaska

- IUCN category V (protected landscape/seascape)
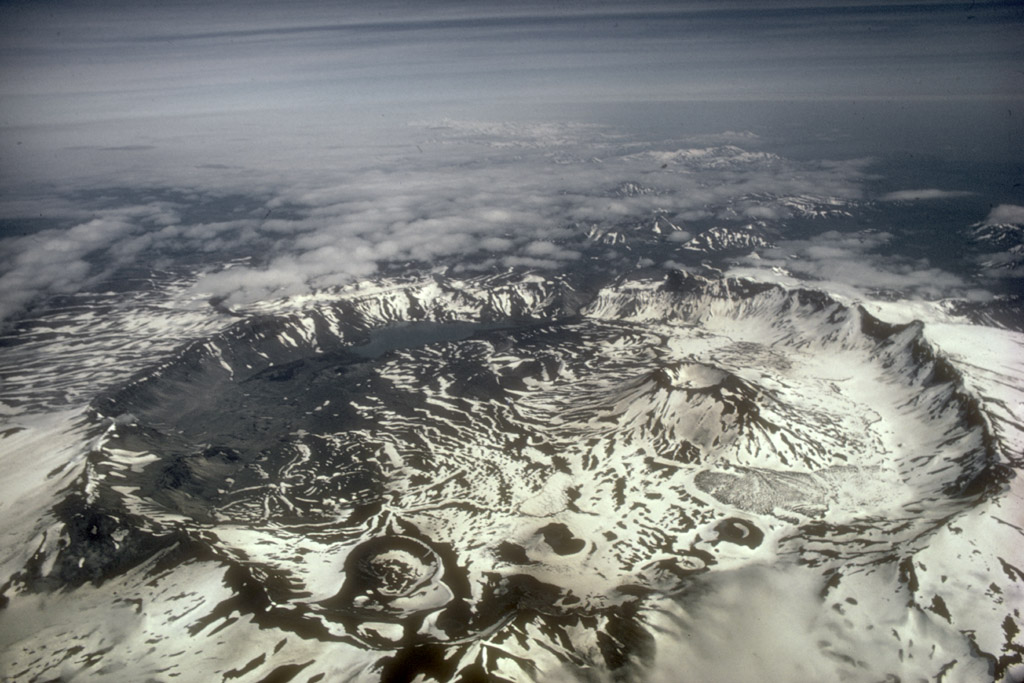
- Aerial view of the caldera of Mount Aniakchak from the west

- Location within Alaska
- Interactive map of Aniakchak National Monument and Preserve
- Location: Lake and Peninsula Borough, Alaska, U.S.
- Coordinates: 56°50′N 158°15′W
- Area: 601,294 acres (2,433.35 km^{2})
- Created: December 1, 1978
- Visitors: 247 (in 2025)
- Governing body: National Park Service
- Website: Aniakchak National Monument and Preserve

U.S. National Natural Landmark
- Designated: 1970

U.S. National Monument
- Designated: December 1, 1978

Aniakchak National Monument and Preserve is a U.S. National Monument and National Preserve, consisting of the region around the Aniakchak volcano on the Aleutian Range of south-western Alaska. It has erupted at least 40 times over the last 10,000 years. The 601,294-acre (243,335 ha) monument is one of the least-visited places in the National Park System due to its remote location and difficult weather. The area was proclaimed a National Monument on December 1, 1978, and established as a National Monument and Preserve on December 2, 1980. The National Monument encompasses 137,176 acres (55,513 ha) and the preserve 464,118 acres (187,822 ha). Visitation to Aniakchak is the lowest of all areas of the U.S. National Park System, according to the NPS, with only 100 documented recreational visits in 2017. Most visitors fly into Surprise Lake inside Aniakchak Crater, but the frequent fog and other adverse weather conditions make landing in the lake difficult. It is also possible to fly into the nearby village of Port Heiden and proceed overland to the Aniakchak Crater.

The core of the national monument lands encompasses the 6-mile (9.7 km) wide Aniakchak Crater. The high point on the caldera rim is Aniakchak Peak. The lake within the caldera, Surprise Lake, is the source of the Aniakchak River. Multiple streams and rivers within the caldera flow into Surprise Lake to form it. In addition to Surprise Lake, the other prominent feature inside the caldera is Vent Mountain, the site of the most recent (1931) eruption within the caldera. The preserve lands flank the monument on either side. Subsistence hunting is allowed in both the monument and preserve, and sport hunting is allowed in the preserve. The region was virtually unexplored until the 1920s, when exploration for oil brought reports of an un-described volcano. A moderate eruption in 1931 forming Vent Mountain resulted in significant publicity, spurring studies to declare the region a national monument. It was not until 1978 that a monument was proclaimed by President Jimmy Carter under the Antiquities Act. The monument and preserve were established within their final boundaries in 1980 with the passage of the Alaska National Interest Lands Conservation Act.

== Description ==
Aniakchak National Monument and Preserve is located about 450 miles (720 km) southwest of Anchorage, Alaska, on the Alaska Peninsula. It is not accessible by road, except from Port Heiden, a nearby village, and then only to the outer flanks of the caldera. The only ways to reach the monument are by floatplane to lakes, particularly Surprise Lake, or sheltered coastal waters, or by boat or airplane to coastal towns near preserve lands followed by overland or overwater traverse. Notoriously bad weather makes access to Aniakchak unpredictable. Drop-offs and pick-ups may be significantly delayed. There are no permanent facilities in the monument and the NPS does not require visitor registration. Visitor services are provided by the interagency King Salmon Visitor Center in King Salmon, Alaska, shared with Lake Clark National Park, Katmai National Park and Preserve, and other National Park Service and U.S. Fish and Wildlife Service units and Alaska local and state agencies. The monument adjoins the Alaska Peninsula National Wildlife Refuge on its northeast and southwest sides. Monument lands amount to 137,000 acres (55,000 ha), and preserve lands 465,000 acres (188,000 ha).

The national monument is centered on the 6-mile (9.7 km) diameter crater of ancient Mount Aniakchak, which was destroyed and the resulting crater formed during a caldera collapse event about 3,700 years ago. The original mountain, about 7,000 feet (2,100 m) tall, collapsed into its magma chamber, leaving an approximate 3,300-foot (1,000 m) deep summit crater. (The elevation of the high point on the crater rim, Aniakchak Peak, is approximately 4,380 feet. The elevation of the low point of the caldera floor, at the mouth of Surprise Lake and the beginning of the Aniakchak River, is approximately 1,055 feet.) The monument and surrounding preserve include the volcanic feature, the wild Aniakchak River, the Bristol Bay coastal habitat, and portions of the coast of the Pacific Ocean.

Prominent features within Aniakchak crater include Surprise Lake and the Gates (the cleft in the caldera rim through which the Aniakchak River flows from Surprise lake to the Pacific Ocean) and Vent Mountain.

The Aniakchak River flows 30 miles to Aniakchak Bay on the coast and can be navigated by inflatable raft or kayak. Upper stretches of the river drop as much as 75 feet per mile and narrow to as little as 15 feet. Lower sections widen into meandering oxbows at sections within view of Cape Horn.

=== Geology ===
The monument and preserve include four major physiographic regions. The monument is centered on the mountains of the Aleutian Range and Aniakchak Crater. The volcano's caldera presents an active volcanic and geothermal landscape and Surprise Lake, the source of the Aniakchak River. Extending outward from the mountains are the glacially altered river valleys. The coastline region extends for 52 miles (84 km) along the southeastern side of the peninsula where it faces the Pacific Ocean.

The mountain spine of the Aleutian Range consists of uplifted mountains of moderate height, reaching 2,500 metres (8,200 ft). The mountain environment is predominantly alpine tundra. Superimposed on the mountain chain are a series of volcanoes, the largest of which is the remnant of Mount Aniakchak, now largely collapsed into its caldera, the floor of which lies about 1,100 feet (340 m) above sea level. The caldera was once partly filled by a crater lake that covered about 50% of the crater. The caldera wall was eventually breached, leading to a catastrophic flood as the lake drained. Its remnant is Surprise Lake, the source of the Aniakchak River.

The river valley zones are subdivided into southeastern and northwestern areas. On the southeast side, the rivers fall steeply through volcanic ash deposits where vegetation has largely recolonized the areas devastated by the volcano's eruption. On the northwest side, the rivers are more gently sloped and the land is boggy with lush vegetation. The southeast coastal region is deeply indented, with coastal cliffs, headlands and islands. Three large bays are the remnants of earlier volcanic craters. The two larger bays are Aniakchak and Amber Bays, and the smaller is Kejulik Bay. All have cinder-covered beaches between the sea and large freshwater lagoons.

== Ecology ==
The Alaska Peninsula climate is cool and wet. Regular Pacific Ocean storms produce estimated annual precipitation exceeding 100 inches (250 cm) along the coast, with more precipitation probable in the mountains. The weather is typically cloudy and windy, producing low ceilings and rough waters that make both aviation and boating hazardous.

Encompassing coastal and mountain habitats, Aniakchak is home to a wide variety of plants and animals. Large terrestrial animals include caribou, Alaskan moose, brown bears, wolf packs and wolverines. Marine mammals include harbor seals, sea lions and sea otters. The 1931 volcanic eruption at Vent Mountain within the crater disrupted plant communities around the volcano, which are now recovering and which are the subject of scientific research.

== History ==
The prehistory of the Aniakchak area is only beginning to come to light as a result of recent archaeological surveys funded by the National Park Service. Present-day native residents consider themselves to be of Aleut ancestry, but linguistic studies indicate that they are related to the similarly named Alutiiq people of Peninsula Yup'ik ancestry. Currently, there is no evidence to suggest when Alutiiq-speaking people first arrived in the region. Archaeological data reveal that the entire central Alaska Peninsula was occupied, abandoned, and re-colonized numerous times, perhaps in response to recurrent catastrophic volcanism and subsequent processes of ecological succession. Nothing is known of the people who lived in the area prior to the 3,700 BP eruption of the Aniakchak volcano. Because there is ample evidence for human habitation in areas nearby, prior to the caldera-forming eruption, it is unlikely that the Aniakchak region was uninhabited. However, the eruption fundamentally altered the landscape, and likely buried the pre-eruption evidence for human activity under many meters of volcanic debris. Lands nearest the caldera were largely uninhabited for millennia: the Pacific Coast was re-colonized by approximately 2000 years ago while the Meshik River drainage was re-colonized approximately 1700 years ago. The cultural affiliations of these colonists have not yet been determined, however it is likely that different people moved into the area at different times.

Russian exploration of Alaska began in the mid-18th century, with fur traders arriving shortly afterwards to take advantage of the sea otters that populated the coast. Traders and native trappers took sea otters along both sides of the Aleutian peninsula. The first recorded mention of the Aniachak region appears in an 1827 atlas, which notes "Baie Amah-chak" and "Cap Kumlik". In 1831 the coast was mapped by the Russian Navy and followed up by two more expeditions in the 1840s. The region was mostly avoided through the rest of the 19th century, apart from a few fur trappers who did not prosper.

The development of the salmon fishing industry in Alaska brought a cannery to Chignik Lagoon in 1882, about 50 miles (80 km) southwest of the future monument. The industry expanded, building fish traps in Aniakchak Bay by 1917. Other traps followed through 1937, some operating until 1949. The Alaska Packers' Association built a bunkhouse on Aniakchak Bay in the 1920s to house workers who maintained the trap and harvested fish during the summer months. At the same time, fur trappers arrived, this time to gather furs from inland mammals.

Reports of oil seeps on the peninsula and on the cape between Aniakchak and Amber Bays in the 1920s brought petroleum exploration and claims, some of which described the "Aniakchak Field". Detailed surveys established that the seeps did not exist, and that much of the region was composed of non-oil-bearing igneous rock, ending speculation. The reports did provoke interest from the U.S. Geological Survey, and in 1922 and 1925 USGS parties surveyed the region. These surveys brought the first detailed accounts of what they described as an "extinct volcano", of which fragmentary information had only emerged after 1919. However, in 1931 Half Cone, one of the cinder cones in the caldera, erupted throughout May of that year, causing ashfalls at distances up to 300 miles (480 km).

Father Bernard R. Hubbard was a Jesuit priest and professor of geology at Santa Clara University in California, who had been exploring Alaska's volcanoes and glaciers every summer season since 1927 and writing about them in best-selling books and in publications such as National Geographic and the Saturday Evening Post. Intrigued by the Alaska Peninsula's volcanoes, he first visited the Aniakchak region in 1930. Hubbard and four companions arrived at the mouth of the Aniakchak River in June 1930. They used a 15-foot (4.6 m) open motorboat to boat up the river, then explored the caldera, finding fumaroles in the crater. They returned in 1931 in time to document (somewhat inaccurately) the aftermath of the May eruption. In 1932 Hubbard and pilot Frank Dorbrandt flew into the caldera and landed on Surprise Lake. Hubbard's dramatically written but mostly accurate descriptions of the region appeared in the New York Times and captured popular imaginations, publicizing the Aniakchak region for the first time. Hubbard described the area as a "wonderland". A follow-up article by Barrett Willoughby in the Saturday Evening Post entitled "The Moon Craters of Alaska" discussed Hubbard's expedition to Aniakchak and nearby Mount Veniaminof in greater detail. National Park Service director Horace M. Albright and his then-assistant Arno B. Cammerer saw the stories and started preparation of documents to proclaim a national monument under the Antiquities Act. After the proposed boundary was altered to exclude regions thought by the USGS to be potential oil sources, the proposed monument was circulated among other federal and territorial agencies for comment. Although there was no particular objection to the monument, there was no strong push for the designation, and the Aniakchak project was shunted aside in favor of a proclamation expanding Katmai National Monument.

In 1932, Aniakchak Bay and the lagoon behind were discovered to have rich beds of razor clams. A cannery was established that year, quickly exhausting the stocks. Over the next decades the region became largely deserted, frequented only by trappers and fishermen. A flurry of renewed interest in oil leases in the 1950s came to nothing. In the 1960s, sport hunters began to frequent the area, focusing primarily on bear and caribou.

=== National monument ===
Interest in a National Park Service unit at Aniakchak was renewed in the 1960s. In 1964, newly appointed Park Service director George B. Hartzog Jr. initialed a study of Alaskan lands titled Operation Great Land. The study recommended protection of Aniakchak. Further studies supported the report's recommendations. In the interim, the Aniakchak caldera was designated a national natural landmark in August 1970. In 1971 the Alaska Native Claims Settlement Act (ANCSA) was passed, which established a framework for the disposition of federal lands in Alaska. The process dictated by ANCSA required agencies to "withdraw" lands which they felt they should administer. The Park Service withdrew 740,200 acres (299,500 ha) around Mount Aniakchak in 1973. The same year a 1,500,000-acre (610,000 ha) Aniakchak Caldera National Recreation Area was proposed, extending to both sides of the peninsula and including Port Heiden on Bristol Bay. Opposition from native groups and the presence of mining claims on some lands forced a scaled-back plan for Aniakchak Caldera National Monument that, at 580,000 acres (230,000 ha), was close to the present area. At about the same time the Aniakchak River was nominated for the National Wild and Scenic Rivers System.

The proposal for a national recreation area was in part a response to concerns that national monument designation would prohibit sport hunting. An early version of the Alaska National Interest Lands Conservation Act (ANILCA), introduced in 1977, addressed the hunting issue by proposing a national monument in the core of the area around the caldera and a national preserve, which would allow sport hunting, in adjacent areas. By late 1978 the bill had become stalled in Congress. With a deadline approaching for the disposition of the lands, President Jimmy Carter was compelled to act.

Aniakchak National Monument was proclaimed on December 1, 1978, by Carter using his authority under the Antiquities Act. The monument covered 380,000 acres (150,000 ha), excluding the area between the caldera and the coast. In 1980 the Alaska National Interest Lands Conservation Act (ANILCA) was finally passed, establishing the unit as a national monument surrounded by a larger national preserve that extended to the coast on the south side of the peninsula. The monument allows subsistence hunting by local residents in most areas and the preserve allows both subsistence and sport hunting. Sport hunting and trapping are therefore only permitted in Aniakchak National Preserve. The most common species hunted include moose and brown bear.

In 1989 the Exxon Valdez oil spill brought oil contamination to the Aniakchak coast. The spill took place on March 24, but oil did not reach the coast of the preserve until July 2. Roughly two thirds of the 68 miles (109 km) of coast were oiled, but not heavily. Cleanup continued from 1989 into 1990.

Aniakchak has the lowest visitor total of any publicly open national park unit in the United States. The number of people actually entering the area is certainly higher, the result of subsistence hunting policies which do not count subsistence hunters, and a few commercial hunting guides hold commercial use permits in the preserve. The National Park Service manages Aniakchak through Katmai National Park and its superintendent.

=== Historic structures ===
- Aniakchak Bay Historic Landscape District
- U.S. National Register of Historic Places
- U.S. Historic district
- Alaska Heritage Resources Survey
- Location within Alaska
- Location: Aniakchak National Monument and Preserve
- Nearest city: Chignik, Alaska
- Coordinates: 56°45′30″N 157°31′19″W
- Area: 2,100 acres (850 ha)
- NRHP reference No.: 97000016
- AHRS No.: SUT-016
- Added to NRHP: February 14, 1997

The Aniakchak Bay Historic Landscape District, also known as the Aniakchak Bay House Pits, surrounds the Aniakchak River from Aniakchak Crater to Aniakchak Bay. It was listed on the National Register of Historic Places in 1997. The site includes the former Columbia River Packers Association cabin at the mouth of the river and surrounding lands, for a total of 10 contributing properties. Archaeological surveys of the area have turned up evidence of native occupation over the last 2000 years.

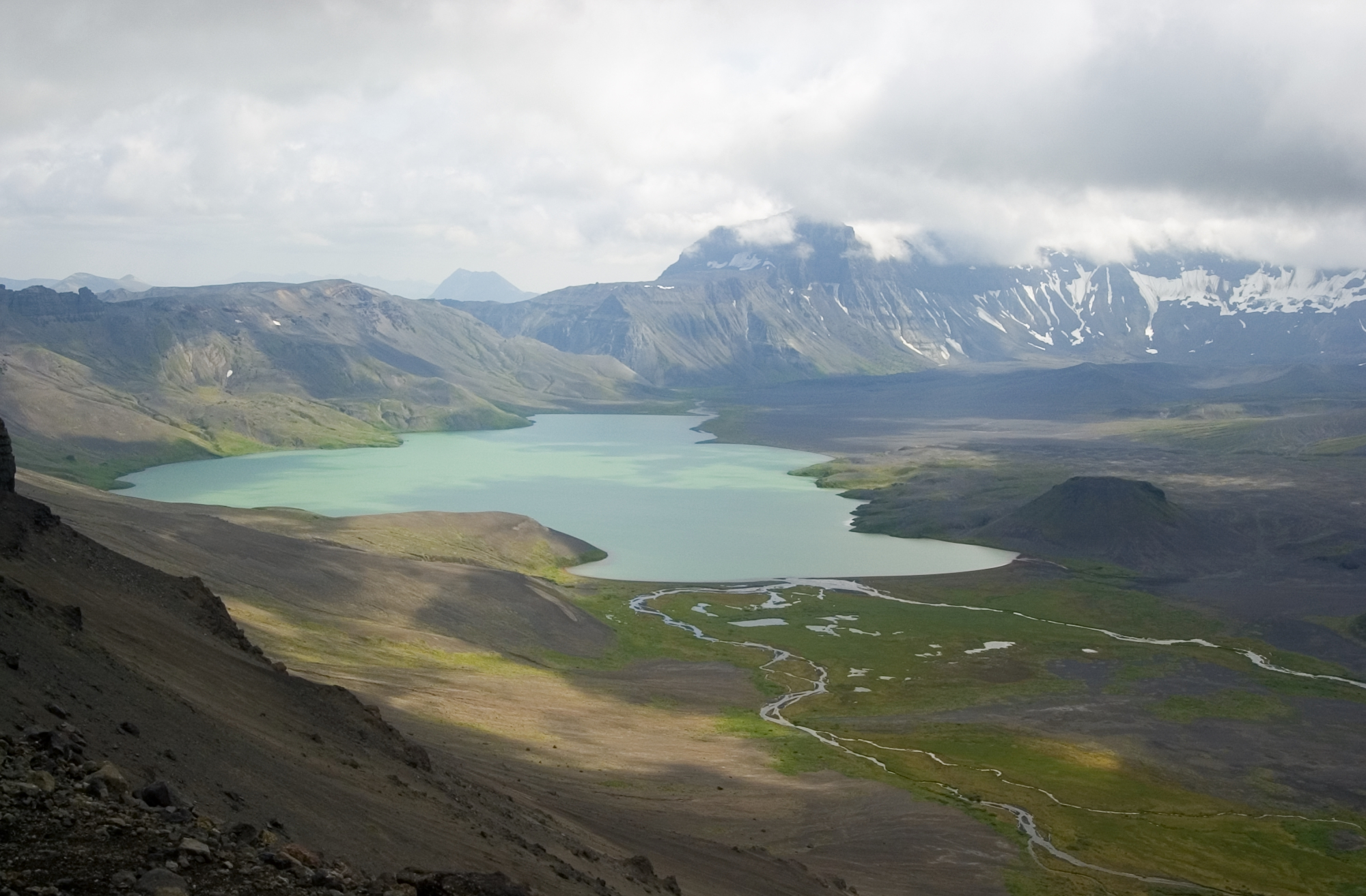
Surprise Lake within the Aniakchak Caldera.

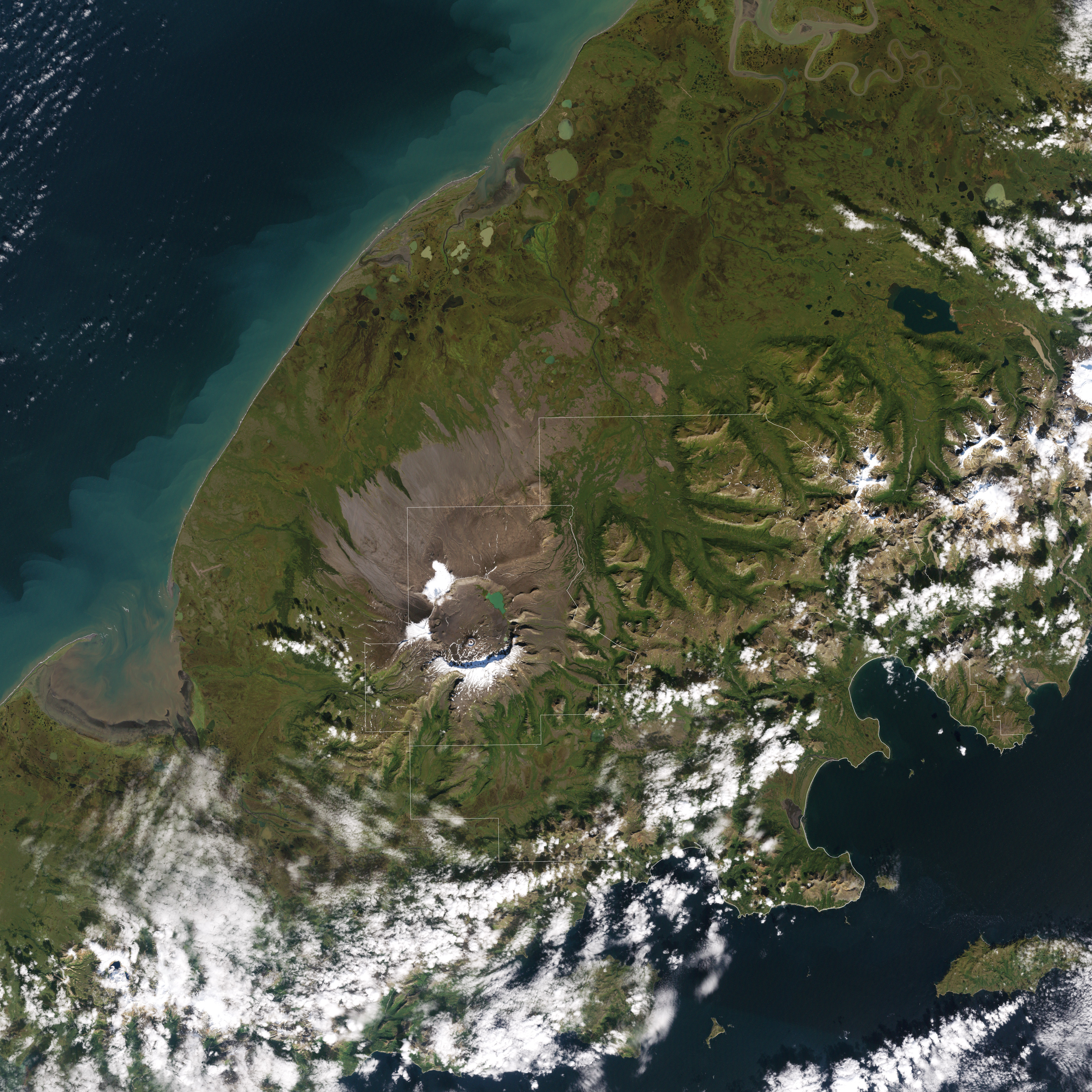
Natural-colour satellite image of Aniakchak National Monument and Preserve.

== See also ==
- List of national monuments of the United States

== Bibliography ==
- Norris, Frank B. (1996) Isolated Paradise: An Administrative History of the Katmai and Aniakchak NPS Units, Alaska, National Park Service
- Ringsmuth, Katherine Johnson (2007) Beyond the Moon Crater Myth: A New History of the Aniakchak Landscape, National Park Service
