= Rocking Moon =

1926 film

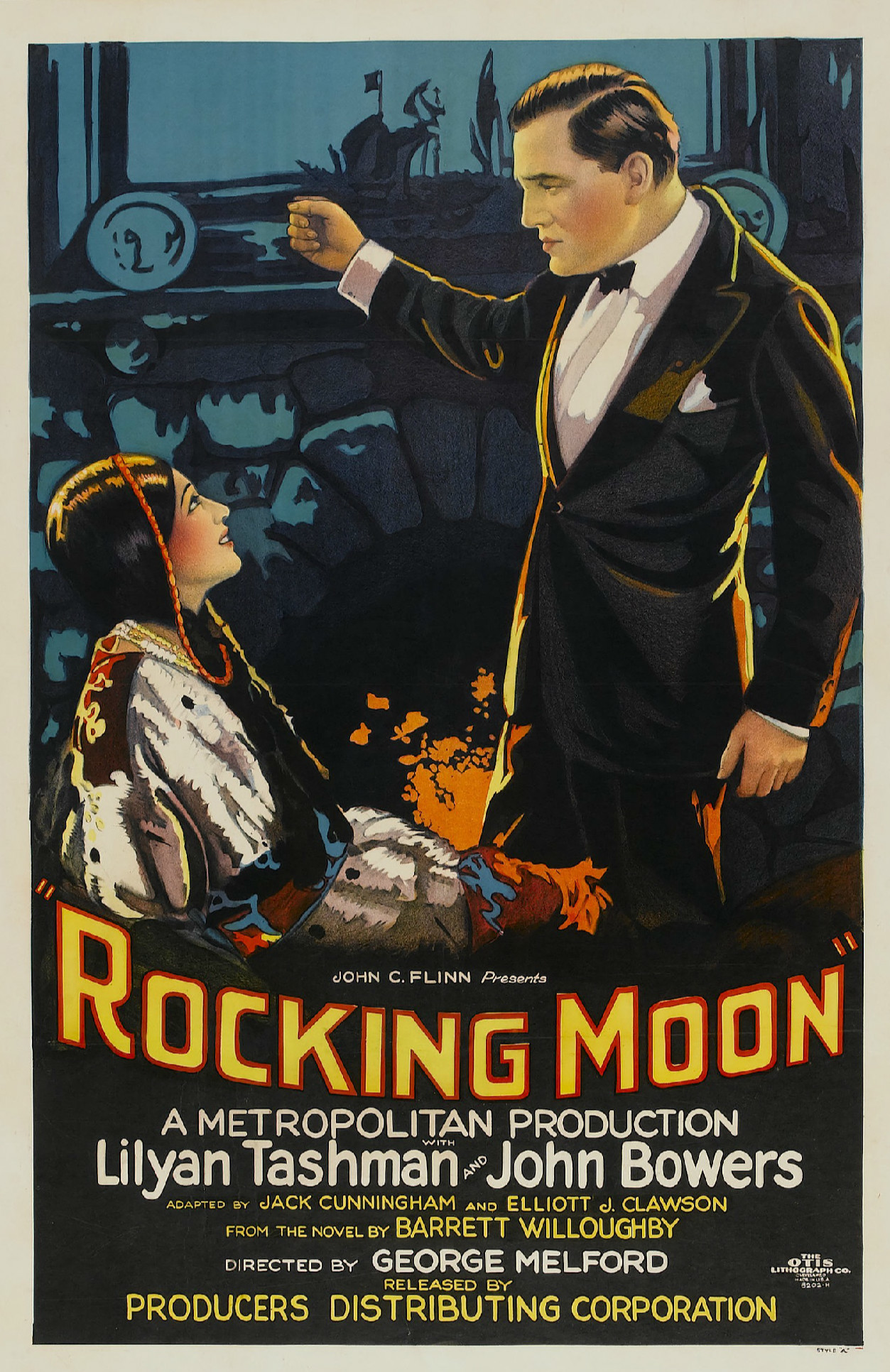
- Lobby poster
- Directed by: George Melford; Edward Bernudy (assistant)
- Written by: Jack Cunningham; Elliott J. Clawson
- Based on: Rocking Moon by Barrett Willoughby
- Produced by: Metropolitan Pictures
- Starring: Lilyan Tashman
- Cinematography: Charles G. Clarke; Joe La Shelle
- Distributed by: Producers Distributing Corporation
- Release date: January 10, 1926
- Running time: 7 reels
- Country: United States
- Language: Silent (English intertitles)

Rocking Moon is a 1926 American silent drama film directed by George Melford and starring Lilyan Tashman and John Bowers. It was released by Producers Distributing Corporation.

== Plot ==
As described in a film magazine review, Sasha Larianoff operates a blue fox farm on Rocking Moon Island, assisted by Gary Tynan. She hopes to pay off a mortgage held by trader Nick Nash with the season's receipts. Sasha's foxes disappear and so does Gary. Nash, who desires Sasha, tells her that Gary has played her falsely. However, Gary has been trapped and bound by invaders of the farm. Escaping, he finds a cavern which contain the missing fox pelts. Gary overcomes Nash, who turns out to be the leader of the bandits, in a terrific fight and wins Sasha's love.

== Cast ==
- Lilyan Tashman as Sasha Larianoff
- John Bowers as Gary Tynan
- Rockliffe Fellowes as Nick Nash
- Laska Winter as Soya
- Luke Cosgrove as Colonel Jeff
- Eugene Pallette as Side Money

== Preservation ==
With no prints of Rocking Moon located in any film archives, it is a lost film.
