= Yantarni Volcano =

Remote andesitic stratovolcano in the U.S. state of Alaska

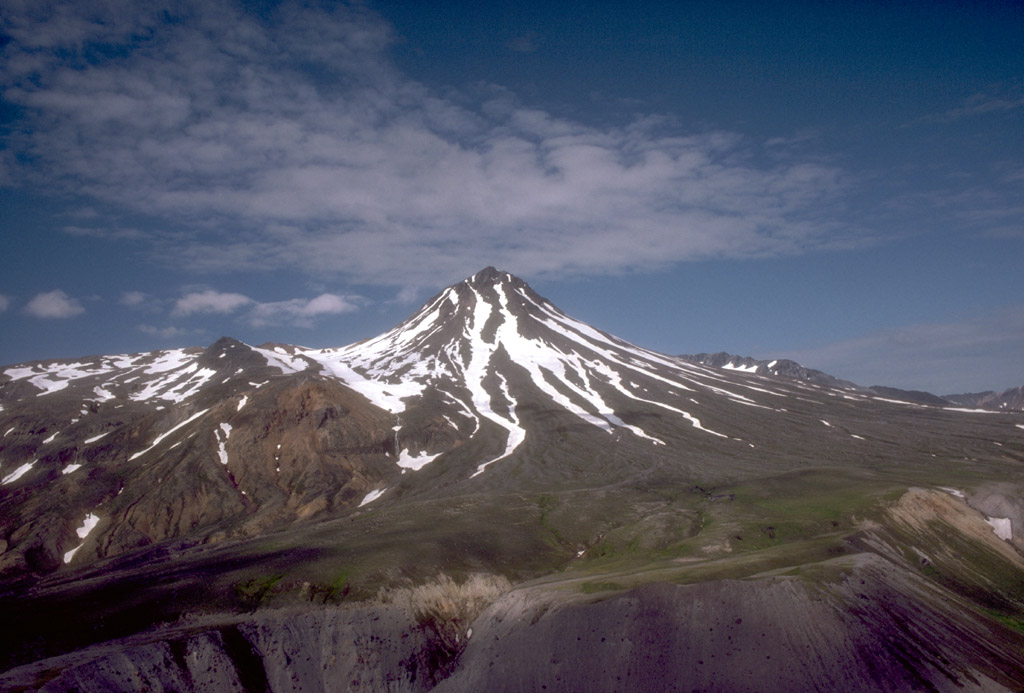
- Yantarni Volcano, September 1985

Highest point
- Elevation: 4,383 ft (1,336 m)
- Prominence: 2,789 ft (850 m)
- Coordinates: 57°01′05″N 157°11′00″W

Geography
- Location within Alaska
- Location: Alaska Peninsula, Alaska, USA
- Parent range: Aleutian Range
- Topo map: USGS Ugashik A-4

Geology
- Formed by: Subduction zone volcanism
- Rock age: Pleistocene to Holocene
- Mountain type: Stratovolcano
- Volcanic arc: Aleutian Arc
- Last eruption: 800 BCE ± 500 years

Yantarni Volcano is an andesitic stratovolcano in the U.S. state of Alaska. It is on the Alaska Peninsula, in the Aleutian Range, between Mount Aniakchak and Mount Chiginagak volcanoes. The volcano was not discovered until 1979 due to its remote location, lack of documented historic activity, and its rather modest summit elevation. The mountain was named after nearby Yantarni Bay, which in turn was named by Russian explorers after the abundance of amber (янтарь/yantarʹ) in the area.

== Geology ==
The current cycle of eruptive activity began in middle Pleistocene time with extrusion of andesitic lava flows, perhaps from multiple vents. By the late Pleistocene, central-vent volcanism had initiated construction of a small stratovolcano.

== 800 BCE ± 500 years eruption ==
The cone was breached sometime in the late Holocene, between 2 and 3.5 ka, during the only Holocene event. The eruption was similar to that of Mount St. Helens and was followed by the emplacement of 1 cu km of pyroclastic flows related to growth of the summit lava dome. It had a Volcanic Explosivity Index of 5.

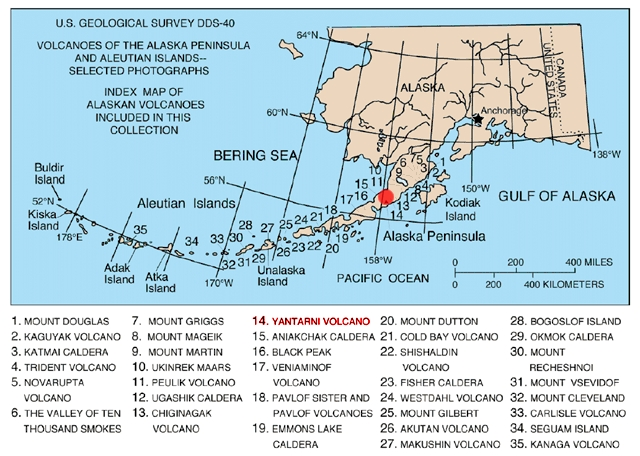
Map showing volcanoes of Alaska. The mark is set at the location of Yantarni Volcano.

== Sources ==
- Volcanoes of the Alaska Peninsula and Aleutian Islands-Selected Photographs
