= Aniakchak River =

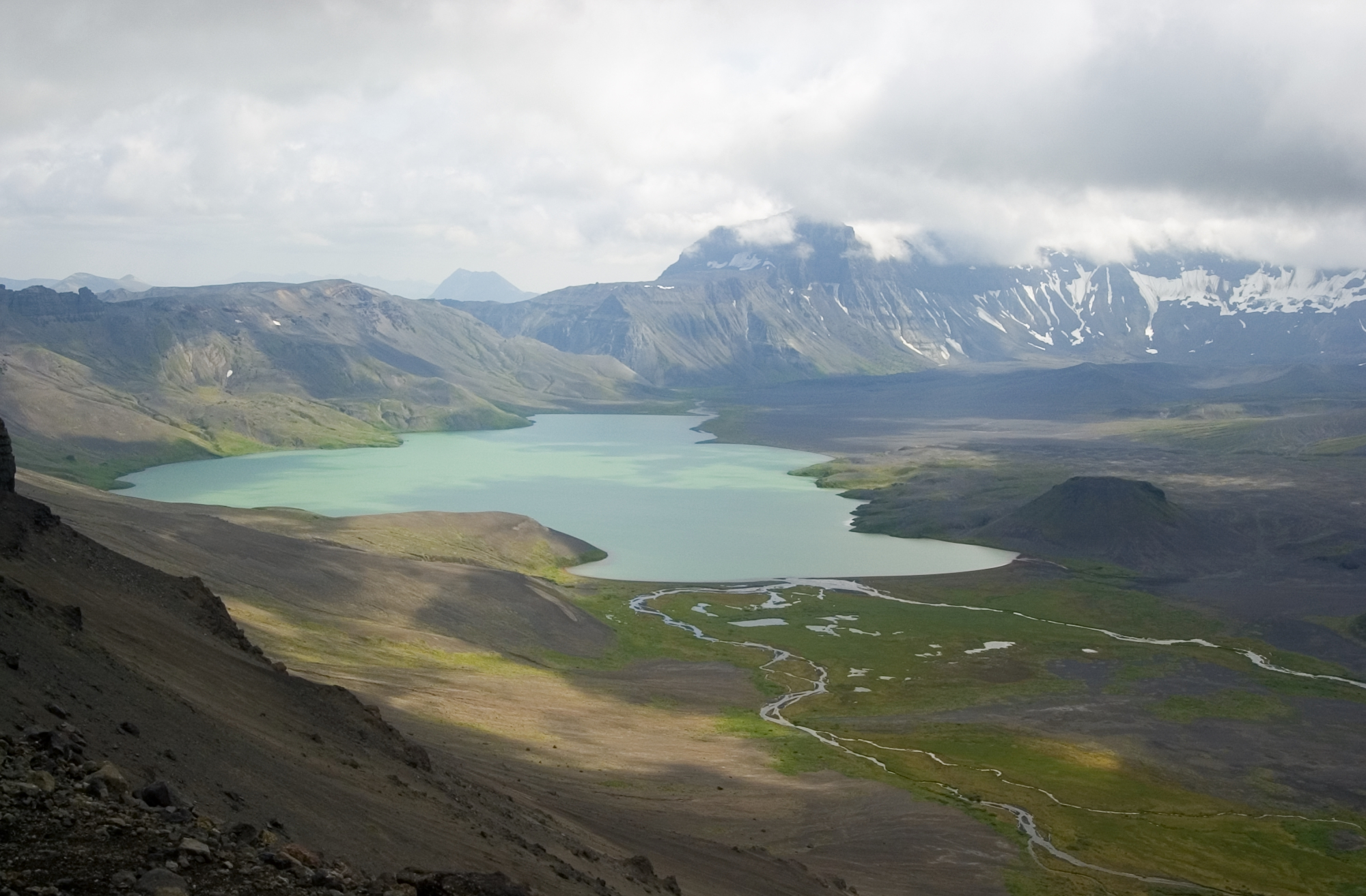

- Location of the mouth of the Aniakchak River in Alaska

Location
- Country: United States
- State: Alaska
- Borough: Lake and Peninsula

Physical characteristics
- Source: Surprise Lake in the crater of Mount Aniakchak, Aleutian Range
  - location: Aniakchak National Monument and Preserve, Alaska Peninsula
  - coordinates: 56°56′45″N 158°10′44″W
  - elevation: 2,511 ft (765 m)
- Mouth: Aniakchak Bay
  - location: 11.5 miles (18.5 km) west of Cape Kunmik
  - coordinates: 56°45′49″N 157°29′43″W
  - elevation: 0 ft (0 m)
- Length: 27 mi (43 km)

National Wild and Scenic River
- Type: Wild
- Designated: December 2, 1980

The Aniakchak River is a stream, 27 miles (43 km) long, in Lake and Peninsula Borough on the Alaska Peninsula in the United States. It arises in Surprise Lake in the crater of Mount Aniakchak, a volcano in the Aleutian Range. It flows eastward from Aniakchak National Monument and Preserve into Aniakchak Bay and the Pacific Ocean.

In 1980, a total of 63 miles (101 km) of streams, including the main stem Aniakchak and several tributaries, all within Aniakchak National Monument and Preserve, were designated "wild" and added to the National Wild and Scenic Rivers System. The "wild" tributaries are Hidden, Mystery, and Albert Johnson creeks and the North Fork Aniakchak River.

== Boating ==
The Aniakchak River is floatable in small to medium rafts and other watercraft. However, The Alaska River Guide advises against trying it "unless you are an expert paddler, extremely self-reliant in Alaska wilderness camping, and ready for severe weather and self-rescue." From a put-in at Surprise Lake, the river begins quietly, but downstream of the Aniakchak Crater wall it plunges through 15 miles (24 km) of rocky rapids rated between Class II (medium) to IV (very difficult) on the International Scale of River Difficulty. Below the rapids, the rest of the river is rated Class I (easy).

In addition to rapids and low temperatures, hazards include winds up to 100 miles per hour (160 km/h) that can damage tents and other equipment and prevent airplanes from landing at the lake or on the bay. Brown bears frequent the area. Sharp rocks in the river may tear holes in inflatable boats. These and other limits reduce the number of parties floating this river to only a few each year, mainly in July.

== See also ==
- List of rivers of Alaska
