= Barrett Willoughby =

American novelist (1901–1959)

Florance Barrett Willoughby
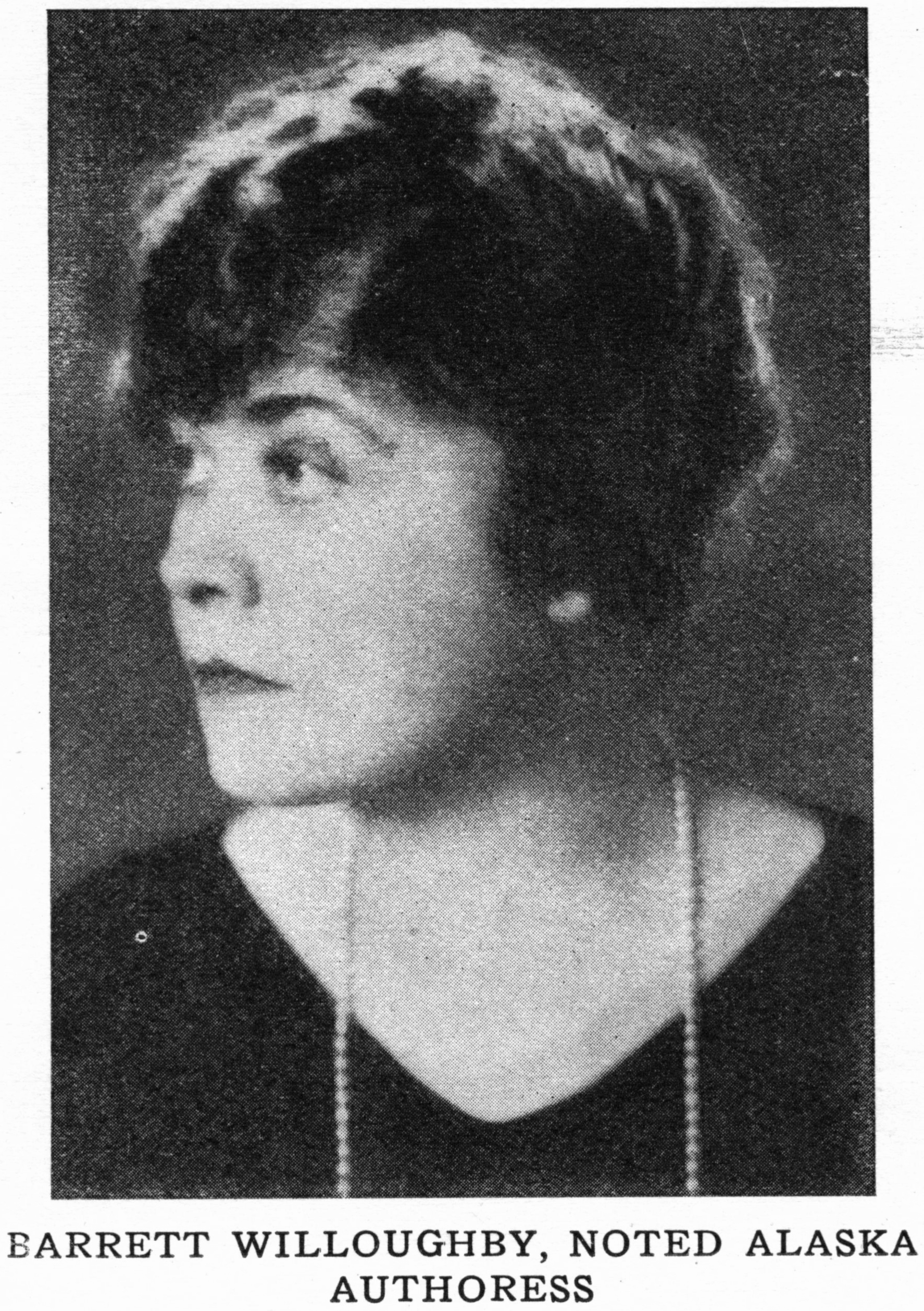
- Born: May 18, 1901; District of Alaska, United States
- Died: July 29, 1959 (aged 58); Berkeley, California
- Occupation: Writer (novelist)
- Writing career
- Pen name: Barrett Willoughby
- Period: 20th century
- Genre: fiction

Barrett Willoughby (May 18, 1901 – July 29, 1959), a.k.a. Florance Barrett, was a best-selling novelist who wrote works of romantic fiction and nonfiction from the 1920s through the 1940s. Her writing was mainly mostly set in Alaska, where she spent many years. Some of her works were made into movies.

Her date of birth is disputed but in the 1910 and 1920 censuses she records her date of birth as May 1886 Wisconsin.

Her social security application recorded May 28 of 1891.

Florence Barrett was married three times: Oliver L. Willoughby, Robert H. Prosser and Larry O’Connor.

She married Oliver L. Willoughby in 1907 and is listed on the 1910 census living in Cordova, Alaska.

She married Robert Henry Prosser 19 Oct 1927 in Coconino County AZ. He contracted meningitis while visiting family in Pennsylvania and died in June 1928.

She married Larry O’Connor July 17, 1935 in Reno NV and filed for divorce July 20, 1942.

== Bibliography ==
- Where the Sun Swings North (1922)
- The Devil Drum (1925)
- Rocking Moon (1925)
- Gentlemen Unafraid (1926)
- The Trail Eater (1929)
- Sitka, Portal to Romance (1930)
- Spawn of the North (1932)
- Alaskans All (1933)
- River House (1936)
- Alaska Holiday (1940)
- The Golden Totem, a novel of modern Alaska (1945)

== Filmography ==
- Rocking Moon (*a movie was made in 1926 Rocking Moon)
- Spawn of the North

== Sources ==
- Ferrell, Nancy Warren (1994). Barrett Willoughby: Alaska's Forgotten Lady. Fairbanks: University of Alaska Press.
