= Espenberg River =

Coordinates: 66°35′41″N 163°57′32″W

The Espenberg River is a 21-mile-long (34 km) river in Alaska's North Slope flowing northeast into the Chukei Seas.

This river is located in the Seward Peninsula, 50 miles (80 km) northwest of Deering. Its name is derived from the nearby point of sand, Cape Espenberg.

== See also ==
- List of Alaska rivers
