= Espenberg volcanic field =

Historical volcanic area in Alaska, United States

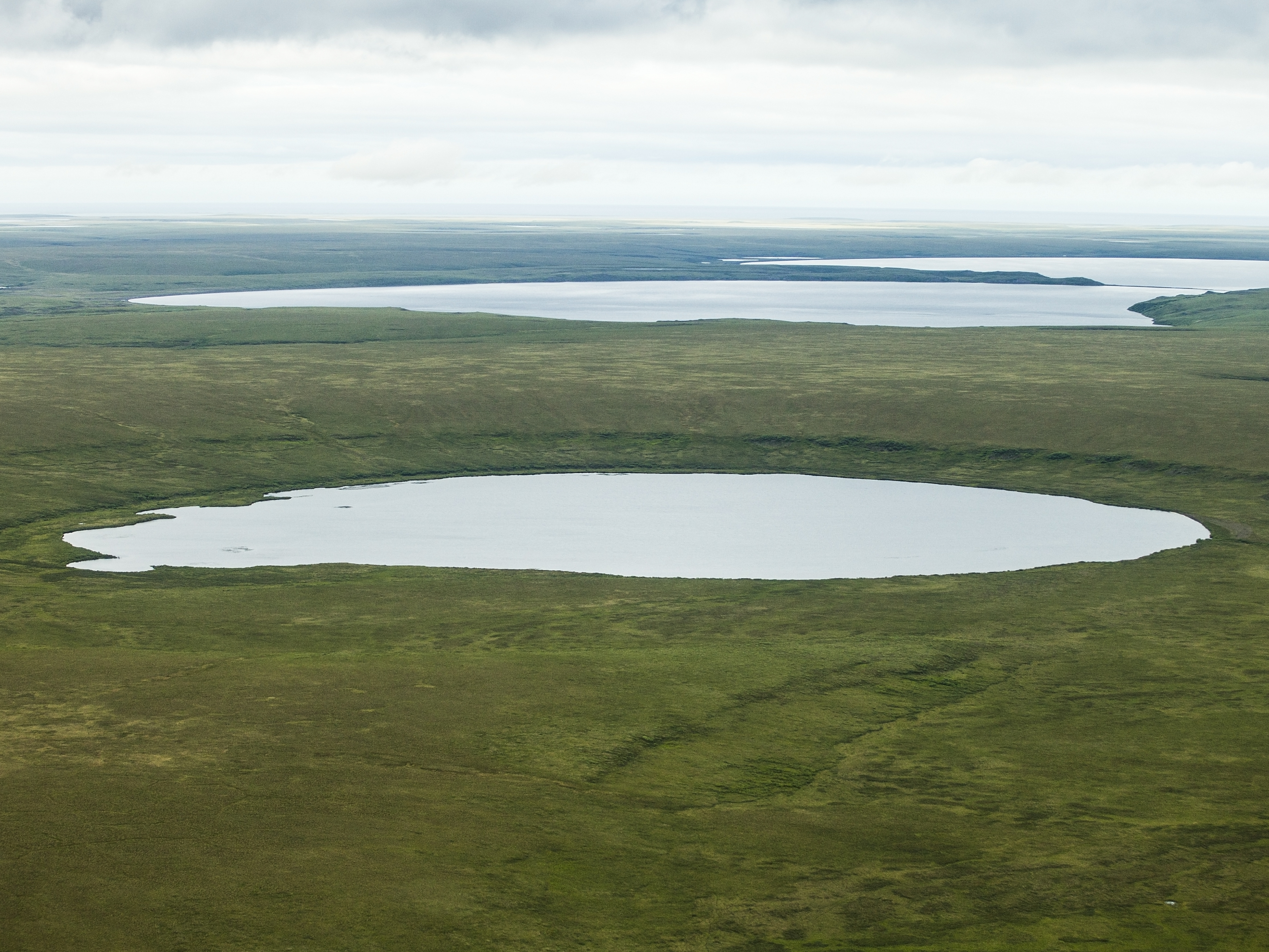
- Whitefish Maar

Highest point
- Peak: Devil Mountain
- Elevation: 797 ft (243 m)
- Coordinates: 66.35°N 164.33°W

Geography
- Location within Alaska

Geology
- Last eruption: Pleistocene

Espenberg is a volcanic field in Alaska that contains the largest maars on Earth. It was active during the Pleistocene until 17,500 years BP, when a large eruption formed the 8 by 6 kilometres (5.0 mi × 3.7 mi) wide Devil Mountain Maar and deposited tephra over 2,500 square kilometres (970 sq mi), burying vegetation and forming the largest maar on Earth. Other maars in the field are the North and South Killeak Maars and Whitefish Maar, and Devil Mountain is a shield volcano.

The large size of these maars has been attributed to the interaction between permafrost and ascending magma, which favoured intense explosive eruptions. Soils buried underneath the Devil Mountain Maar tephra have been used to reconstruct the regional climate during the Last Glacial Maximum. The maars are part of the Bering Land Bridge National Preserve.

== Toponyms ==
"Killeak" means "East" in the Inupiaq language. Devil Mountain Maar is also known as "Qitiqliik" or "Kitakhleek" ("Double Lakes") and Whitefish Maar as "Narvaaruaq" or "Navaruk" ("Big Lake"). This volcanic field is also known as the Cape Espenberg-Devil Mountain volcanic field.

== Geography and geomorphology ==
The Espenberg volcanoes lie on the northern Seward Peninsula in Alaska. They are the northernmost volcanoes of North America with late Pleistocene activity, lying just south of the Arctic Circle. Other volcanoes of the Seward Peninsula are found at Imuruk Lake. There are no roads in the area but the maars can be readily reached from the sea by following streams or by chartered bush aircraft.

Espenberg is located on a peninsula between the Chukchi Sea to the north and west and Goodhope Bay to the east. From east to west lie North and South Killeak Maar, Devil Mountain Maar and Whitefish Maar; additionally there are cinder cones, lava flows and five small shield-like volcanoes such as Devil Mountain. Devil Mountain appears to be capped with an alignment of cinder cones with associated lava flows. Volcanologically, the field is situated in a back-arc region. Volcanic rocks from the field have basaltic compositions.

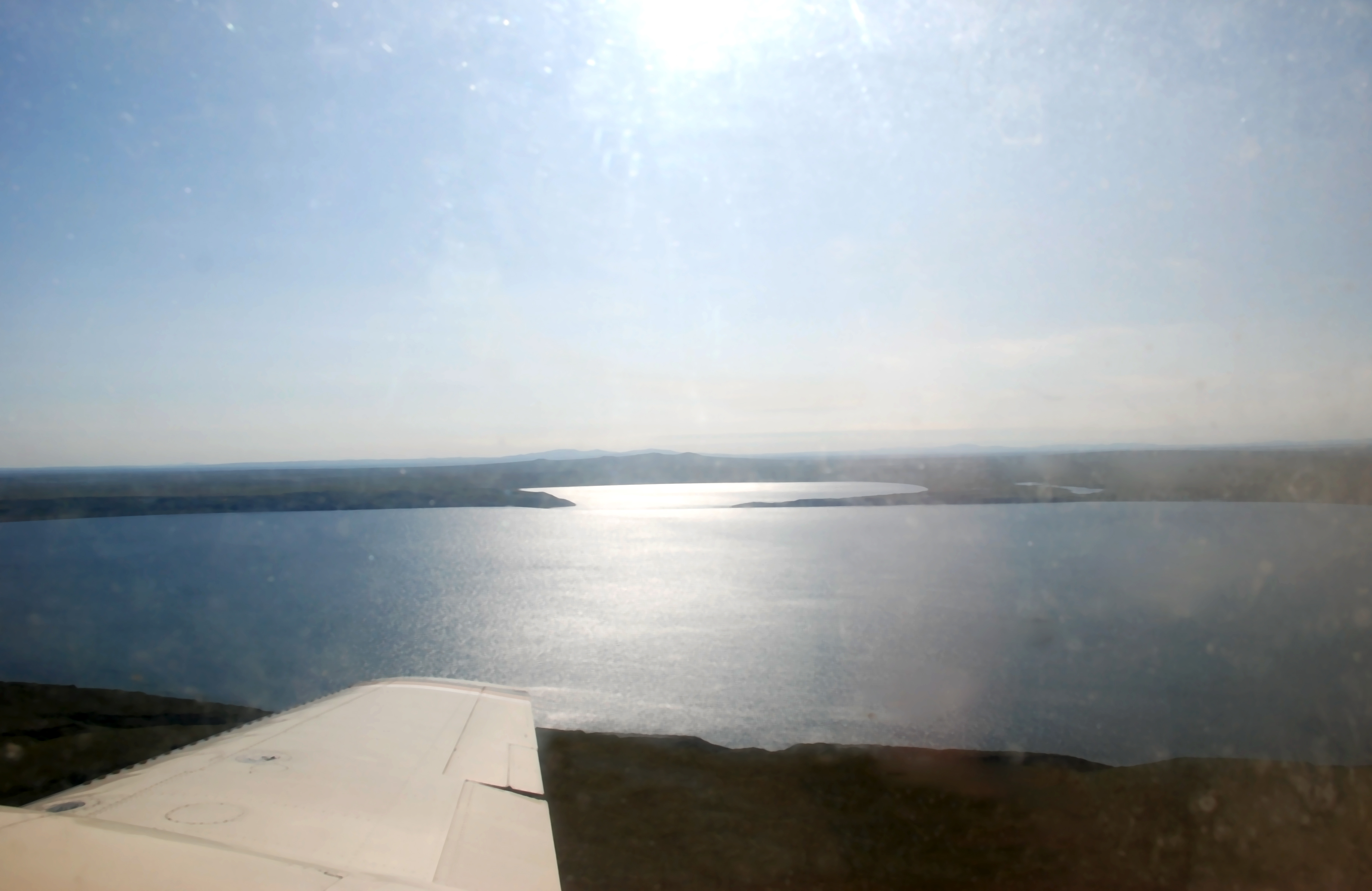
Devil Mountain Maar

Devil Mountain Maar is 8 by 6 kilometres (5.0 mi × 3.7 mi) wide and 200 metres (660 ft) deep, while North Killeak Maar, South Killeak Maar and Whitefish Maar are 4 kilometres (2.5 mi), 5 kilometres (3.1 mi) and 4.3 kilometres (2.7 mi) wide and the Killeak Maars reach depths of over 60 metres (200 ft); Whitefish Maar is much shallower with a depth of 6 metres (20 ft). Such dimensions make the Espenberg maars the largest known on Earth and the Espenberg maars comparable in size with calderas; other maars at lower latitudes are much smaller. The maars are mostly circular with the exception of Devil Mountain Maar which is partly separated by a small sand spit into the northern 5.1 kilometres (3.2 mi) wide North Devil Mountain Maar and the 3.4 kilometres (2.1 mi) wide South Devil Mountain Maar; formerly they were considered to be two separate maars.

The water surface of the maars lies between 60–80 metres (200–260 ft) below their rim. Eight 0.1–1 kilometre (0.062–0.621 mi) wide and 50–100 metres (160–330 ft) deep crater-like depressions lie underwater in Devil Mountain Maar and similar but partly filled depressions are also found at the Killeak Maars. Layered volcanic deposits crop out in 10–40 metres (33–131 ft) high cliffs around Devil Mountain Maar and within gullies around the other maars.

The maars are emplaced in over 300 metres (980 ft) thick lavas and sediments of Pleistocene age. The Singeakpuk River, the Kalik River, the Kitluk River, the Espenberg River and the Kongachuk Creek flow through the volcanic field; the Kitluk River drains Devil Mountain Maar. Other than volcanic constructs, plateaus, thermokarst lakes, dry lakes and yedoma hills dot the landscape.

== Climate, biota and human use ==
At Kotzebue, 60 kilometres (37 mi) northeast of the volcanic field, annual temperatures fluctuate between 11.9 °C (53.4 °F) in July and −20.2 °C (−4.4 °F) in January. Annual precipitation there is about 230 millimetres per year (9.1 in/year), mostly falling during summer. The vegetation belongs to the Bering tundra ecoregion and is not uniform over the area. Green alder thickets and willow grow on the maar benches; at Tempest Lake north of Devil Mountain Maar the vegetation is characterized by a tundra featuring forbs, mosses, sedges and shrubs and is quite dense. Caribou used to be frequent in the area, and there are numerous fish in the maars.

Native Americans used the maars as a source of fish and as hunting grounds, and remains of human activity have been identified at their shores. Devil Mountain was used as a lookout post, navigational landmark and as a source of rocks for sinkers and weights. In recent times, sediment cores were obtained from North Killeak Maar and Whitefish Maar; the former has been used to reconstruct the past climate of the region during the Holocene, including the occurrence of cold periods. The Espenberg volcanoes are part of the Bering Land Bridge National Preserve.

== Eruption history ==
The non-maar vents at Espenberg appear to be over 500,000 years old, given that they are covered with vegetation and the lavas shattered by frost, and are probably older than the maars. The Espenberg maars were originally considered to be of Holocene age, but research has shown that the latest eruptions occurred during the Pleistocene. Various dating methods have been used to determine the ages of the Espenberg maars:

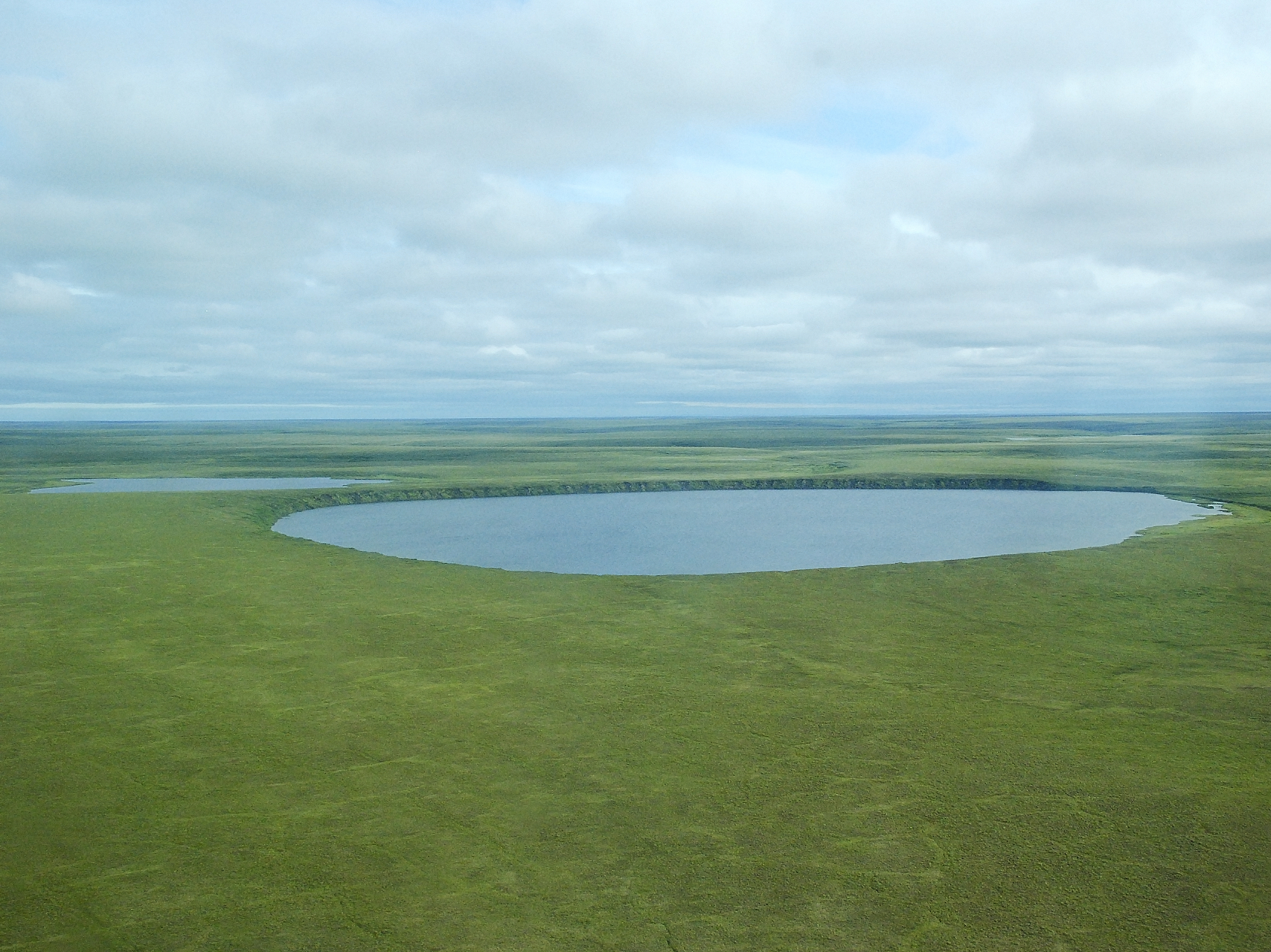
North and South Killeak Maar

- Whitefish Maar might be 100,000 – 200,000 years old, perhaps 160,000 years ago. Sedimentation since the eruption has partly filled in Whitefish Maar and reduced its depth.
- North Killeak Maar is over 125,000 years old, older than South Killeak Maar.
- South Killeak Maar formed over 40,000 years ago.
- Devil Mountain Maar is the youngest vent, it formed 17,500 years BP and is the most recent volcanic event of the area. Formerly it was believed that its northern half was 7,100 years old.

All maars formed in one complex eruption sequence which in the case of Devil Mountain Maar probably lasted only a few weeks to months. During the eruption, numerous individual explosions and surges took place and emplaced base surges and Strombolian deposits, while frozen blocks of sediment were ejected from the vents. Devil Mountain Maar appears to have formed from the coalescence of several vents during the course of the eruption. Individual explosive events formed the depressions on the floor of the maars.

Devil Mountain Maar deposited a tephra called the Devil Mountain Lake tephra over an area of 2,500 square kilometres (970 sq mi). It reached thickness of more than 1 metre (3 ft 3 in) over an area of 1,200 square kilometres (460 sq mi), burying soil and vegetation and falling into lakes. The soil found underneath the Devil Mountain Maar tephra is known as Kitluk paleosoil. Plant remains found buried underneath the tephra are well preserved and have been used to infer climatic and biotic conditions during the Last Glacial Maximum in the region; vegetation at that time was apparently different from today and there was no widespread ice cover. The tephra is used as a tephrostratigraphic marker for the late Pleistocene. The eruption of the Killeak Maars also produced tephra deposits, which are also found in lakes and have similar compositions to the tephra of the Devil Mountain Maar. Their deposition disrupted local wetlands and altered the topography.

=== Mechanism of formation ===
Maars are after cinder cones the second-most common type of volcano. They form when magma interacts explosively with surrounding rocks, excavating broad but shallow craters on the surface. The Espenberg maars are the first known maars to have formed within permafrost; other large maars in permafrost have been found in the Pali-Aike volcanic field of Argentina. Interactions between magma and ice are different than these between lava and ice, as ice conducts heat only slowly and a large amount of energy is consumed during its sublimation; thus its melting and explosive evaporation occurs only slowly.

The maars lie in c. 100 metres (330 ft) thick permafrost, which was probably thicker during the Pleistocene when the maars formed. The abundant ice would have produced a limited amount of water due to thermodynamic limitations of magma-induced ice melting, creating an ideal environment for highly explosive eruptions which may have been further intensified by the release of methane during the thawing of the permafrost. Landslides at the margins of the volcanic vents expanded the forming craters and supplied additional ice to the evaporation processes, ultimately yielding the large size of the Espenberg maars. The eruptions that formed the Espenberg maars occurred during fully glacial climate, while interglacial (including Holocene) eruptions on the Seward Peninsula have yielded lava flows; this implies that the glacial climate influenced the types of eruption that took place.

The Espenberg maars have been used as analogues for certain craters on the planet Mars.

== See also ==
- List of volcanic fields
