= Cape Espenberg =

Cape on the Seward Peninsula in Alaska

Coordinates: 66°33′32″N 163°37′01″W

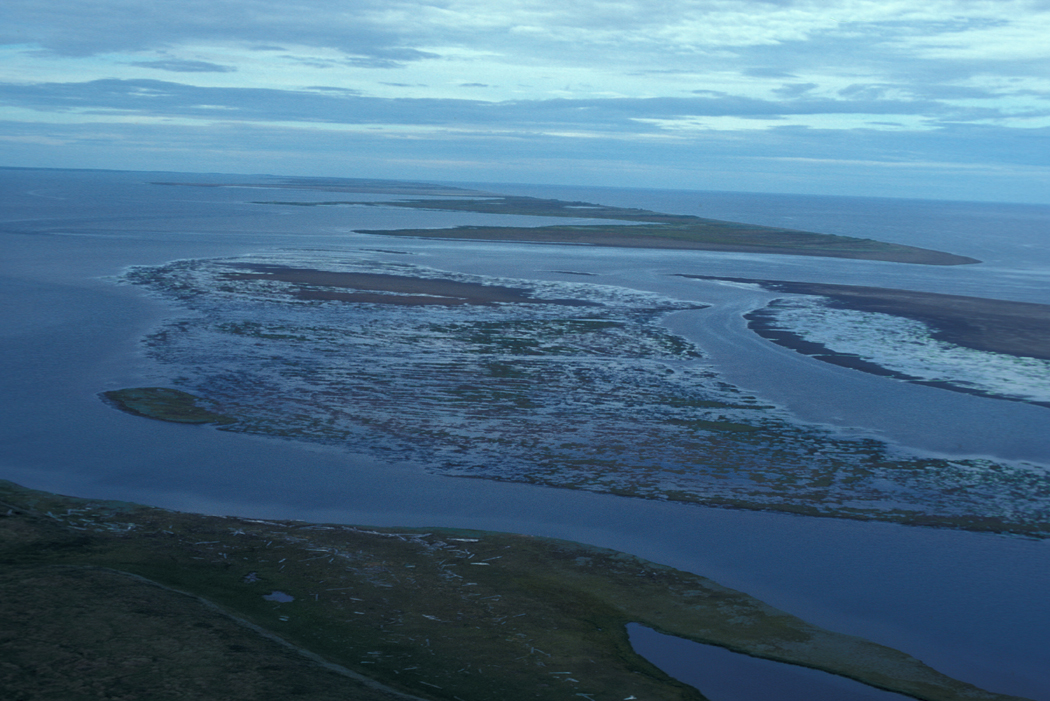
Barrier islands and lagoons at Cape Espenberg

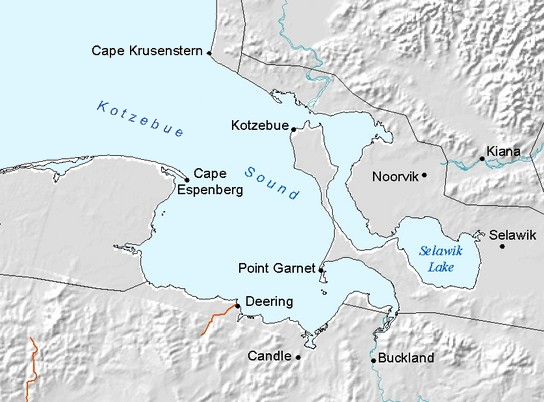
Map showing Kotzebue Sound and Cape Espenberg

Cape Espenberg is a cape located on the Seward Peninsula in Alaska, on the Chukchi Sea coast.

Cape Espenberg points northwards, 42 mi NW of Deering, Kotzebue-Kobuk Low. On its southeastern side there is the small Goodhope Bay, an inlet of the Kotzebue Sound.

Named in 1816 by Lt. Otto von Kotzebue (1821, p. 236) for Dr. Karl Espenberg, a surgeon who accompanied Captain (later Admiral, IRN) Adam Johann von Krusenstern on his voyage around the world in 1803–06.

Cape Espenberg lies on the Arctic Circle at the terminus of a 30 km long mainland attached beach ridge plain at the northern limit of Seward Peninsula, in western Alaska. At the entry of the shallow Kotzebue Sound embayment, Cape Espenberg faces a potential open water fetch of 1000 km across the Chukchi Sea, an impact that is restricted by a perennial ice cover decreasing in duration the last 10 years.

Cape Espenberg, located 40 km east of a pronounced easterly deflection in the coast, is the depositional sink of a 200 km long littoral transport system fostered by a dominant west to northwest wind regime. Due to an abundant offshore source, sandy barrier islands front most of the northwest facing Seward Peninsula from Bering Strait into Kotzebue Sound, enclosing several extensive lagoons. The Chukchi Sea is microtidal < 50 cm, and the prevailing westerly currents maintain a series of widely spaced offshore bars that typically damp onshore wave energy. Storm surges occur with some regularity in the fall, with the extreme events, attaining a maximum elevation of 3 to 4 meter.

The beach is extremely planar and composed of comparatively well-sorted fine and medium sand, with a few stray cobbles of uncertain but probable ice-rafted origin. Dunes occur in the back beach, stabilized by grass, attaining a height of ca. 4 m. The sand is considered by geologists to reflect multiple sources. Its most common constituent, a fine quartzose sand is most dense on the shallow shelf north of Bering Strait and reflects a complex history. A significant amount of Yukon River sand entered the southern Chukchi Sea during the Holocene transgression, hypothetically forming and reworking a series of early Holocene barriers into a retreat massif similar to that of the mid-Atlantic.

A secondary source of sand may be as a fluvial addition from south-trending paleo-Noatak and Kobuk rivers cross the exposed subcontinent of Beringia, and reworked into Pleistocene dunes during lower sea levels. The dark medium sand reflects updrift bluff erosion of a tephraeous maar eruption about 17,000 years ago. Sand supply is maintained by onshore transport during a five-month open water period from June to November. Although in the long-term, as established by geological 14C ages, over the last 4000 years, sand transport is onshore and progradational, in the short term, storms and transient current reversals lead to offshore transport and erosion of Espenberg beaches. Locally, beaches have witnessed significant width and depth reductions in the last five years; current reversals are also possibly more common.

A variety of clastic additions are common on the beach; these include the bones of Pleistocene megafauna (mostly horse, bison or mammoth), modern and ancient shell valves. Drift wood is concentrated in the storm beach and within the mouths of surge channels that cross cut the beach ridges. The wood, mostly spruce (Picea spp. ) is transported from the forested Yukon River drainage; cottonwood and birch are rare. Current reversals, resulting from easterly winds, lead to beach erosion, and are often coupled with the deposition of starfish and of eel grass from the enclosed lagoon.

Lying wholly within tundra, dune formation is furthered along the Espenberg beach by the winter drying of beach sand, onshore winds in late spring, and the dominance of sand-burial tolerant beach grass (Elymus spp.). High dunes correlate with heightened storm events during the Little Ice Age and contain evidence of shell beds emplaced during storm surges. Intense storms produced erosional truncations across the spit between 1000 BC and AD 200 and during the Little Ice Age.

The beach featured lies about 1 km Northwest from the navigational light at the Cape and can be considered unaffected by human processes, since the National Park Service restricts the use of motor vehicles and the region is nearly uninhabited. The closest settlement is ca. 10 km away and consists only of several cabins used seasonally by Inupiat hunters and fishers.

== History ==
Over 4,000 years of prehistory are revealed at Cape Espenberg, as documented by archaeological surveys since the 1950s when J.Louis Giddings visited the Cape. Research by the National Park Service has included survey by Jeanne Schaaf in 1986 and excavations led by Roger Harritt in 1988 and 1989. The Espenberg dunes contain small sites as well as extensive villages with dozens of house depressions. The cultural chronology of the Cape is constructed on the basis of >120 radiocarbon ages. Since 2007, several research projects were funded by the National Science Foundation, led by John F. Hoffecker, Owen K. Mason and Claire M. Alix. The dunes contain a remarkable record of architectural history and cultural change in relation to climate change. The earliest occupations at the Cape ca. 2500 calibrated BCE record the first maritime adaptions along the north Alaska coast.

In 2011, archaeologists found metal artifacts at Cape Espenberg, including a cast bronze buckle, very likely smelted in East Asia, either Siberia or farther South. The finds were discovered adjacent to a house inhabited by the Birnirk people, the presumed ancestors of the modern Inuit. The metal objects were not locally cast, based on metallurgical analyses (X-ray fluorescence) by Purdue University Assistant Professor H. Kory Cooper. The metal was deposited at Cape Espenberg at least 500 years before sustained contact with Europeans in the late 1700s. While the metal is not directly dated, the "buckle" was attached to a leather strap that yielded a calibrated radiocarbon date of ca AD 1200.
