= Mary River (Alaska) =

River in Alaska, United States

Mary River is a waterway in the U.S. state of Alaska. Situated on the northwestern portion of Seward Peninsula, it was included in the Agiapuk River mining district.

The Mary River has a length of about 20 miles (32 km) and flows into the upper end of Imuruk Basin. About 5 miles (8.0 km) from its mouth, the river forks, the two branches being of about equal size. The lower part of the course of the Mary River is within the flats which border Imuruk Basin. Above these flats, the valleys of the two branches of the Mary River are wide, and within them, the rivers meander over broad flood plains. Between the forks of the river there is a broad, flat-topped ridge, with an elevation of 700 feet (210 m), which is partly covered with washed gravel. At the edge of the Imuruk lowlands, where the Mary River enters them, there are gravel bluffs and isolated gravel buttes. These bluffs and buttes are remnants of a higher gravel plain. On the ridge between the forks of the Mary River, there are two low, rocky buttes, which, on account of the general low relief of the region, stand out as landmarks. These buttes are composed of white crystalline limestone, whose bedding is obscured by jointing and cleavage. Except for these buttes, the bed rock, as indicated by fragments found on the surface, consists of calcareous mica schists. The Kuzitrin slates form a broad belt of dark schistose quartzites between the Mary River and the Kuzitrin at Mary's Igloo. About the heads of the two branches of the Mary River, the bed rock consists of calcareous and graphitic schists similar to those on Igloo and Budd creeks, tributaries of the American River. Little bed rock is exposed on the Mary River. Gold is not known to have been found on this river.
