= Parmenter =

Parmenter is a surname. Notable people with the surname include:

- Amy Parmenter (born 1997), Australian netball player
- Carolyn Parmenter, fictional character in the Marvel Universe
- Charles S. Parmenter (1933–2025), American chemist
- Christine Whiting Parmenter (1877–1953), American author
- Dennis Parmenter (1950–2020), Illinois politician
- Doug Parmenter (born 1987), British musician
- Ezra Parmenter (1823–1873), Massachusetts politician
- Ian Parmenter (1945–2024), Australian celebrity chef, winemaker and author
- Michael Parmenter (born 1954), New Zealand choreographer and dancer
- Ross Parmenter (1912–1999), Canadian music critic, editor and author
- Roswell A. Parmenter (1821–1904), New York politician
- Steve Parmenter (born 1977), English association football player
- Terry Parmenter (born 1947), English association football player
- William Parmenter (1789–1866), US Representative from Massachusetts
