= Eight Cousins =

1875 novel by Louisa May Alcott

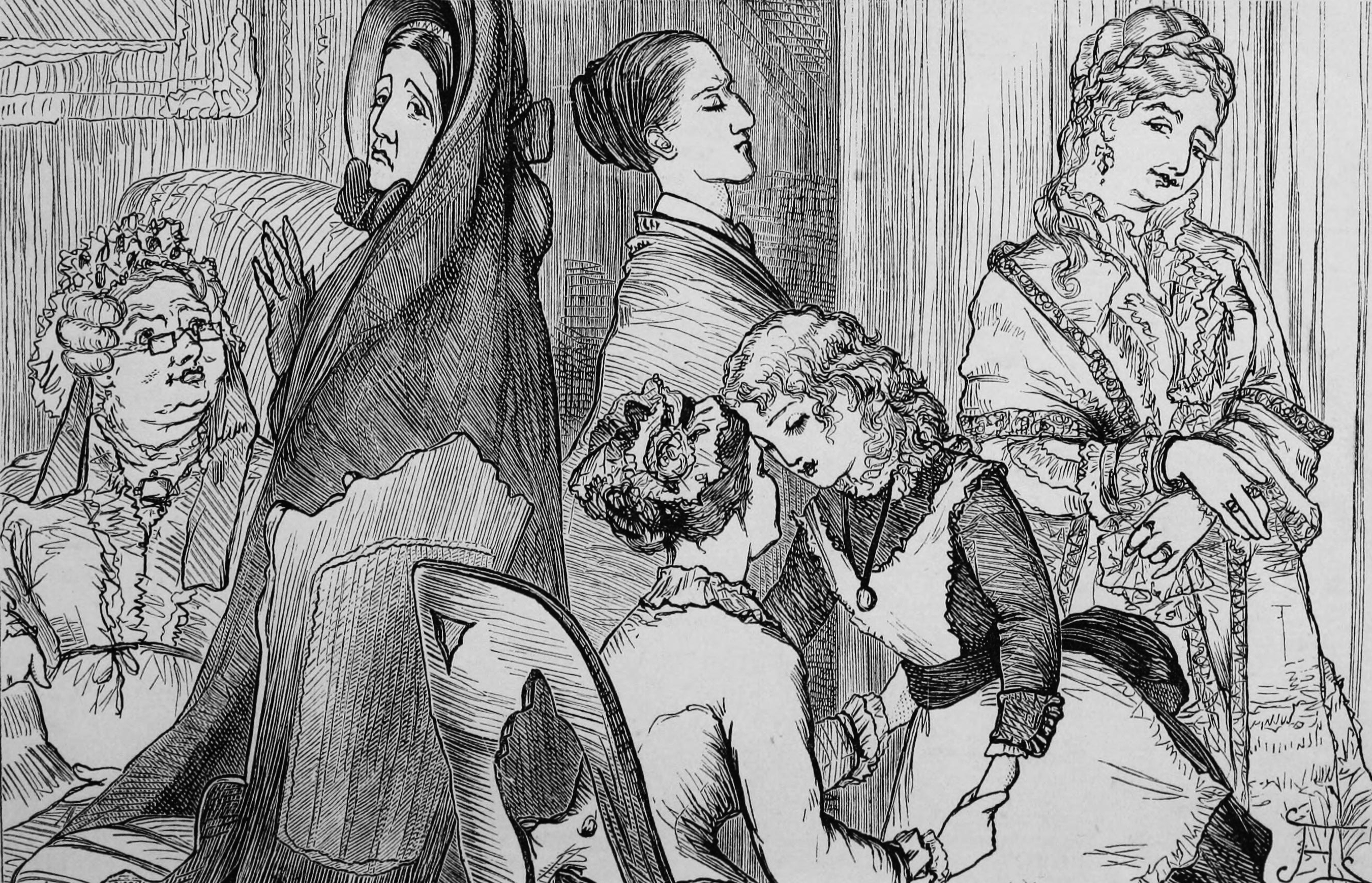
- Rose and her Aunts, frontispiece illustration in first edition
- Author: Louisa May Alcott
- Language: English
- Publisher: Roberts Brothers.
- Publication date: 1875
- Publication place: United States
- Pages: 290
- Followed by: Rose in Bloom

Eight Cousins, or The Aunt-Hill was published in 1875 by American novelist Louisa May Alcott. It was originally published as a serial in St. Nicholas and is part of the Little Women Series. It is the story of Rose Campbell, who has been recently orphaned and resides with her maiden great aunts, the matriarchs of her wealthy family near Boston, until her guardian, Uncle Alec, returns from abroad to take over her care. Through his unorthodox theories about child-rearing, she becomes happier and healthier while finding her place in her family of seven boy cousins and numerous aunts and uncles. She also makes friends with Phebe, her aunts' young housemaid. Eight Cousins received both favorable and unfavorable reviews in the early days of its publication. Reviews focused on Alcott's stylistic tone as well as the portrayal of characters and realism. In Eight Cousins, Alcott discusses transcendental education, child-rearing, and social differences.

== Characters ==
Rose Campbell: The central character of the novel is the daughter of the recently deceased George Campbell, one of six Campbell brothers who are nephews of Aunts Plenty and Peace Campbell. She is heiress to his considerable fortune. (The Campbells, wealthy residents of Boston, are of Scottish descent, and some of them are engaged in the China trade.) Rose has never known her mother and has lived apart from the rest of the Campbell family all her life. She is slightly vain

=== The aunts of the "Aunt-hill" ===
- Plenty Campbell: Maiden great-aunt of Rose and matriarch of the family.
- Peace Campbell: Maiden sister of Plenty. An invalid, she has a tragic history. Her lover died hours before their wedding, and "gentle Peace" never recovered from the blow.
- Myra Campbell: She is a widow and we never learn her husband's name. Myra is a gloomy, self-absorbed hypochondriac, obsessed with medicines and mortality. Her presence is tolerated rather than welcomed by the rest of the family. She is the mother of the only other female Campbell cousin, Caroline, who died young – possibly "dosed to death" – inadvertently poisoned by her mother.
- Jane Humphries Campbell: Wife of Uncle Mac and mother of Rose's cousins Mac and Steve. Aunt Jane is a stern disciplinarian, and she is completely reliable. Rose comes to like and trust her.
- Clara Campbell: Wife of Uncle Stephen, who is absent in India. Clara is a social butterfly, completely absorbed in Boston's high society. She looks forward to sponsoring Rose's debut in a few years’ time and secretly plans that Rose shall marry her son Charlie.
- Jessie Campbell: Wife of Uncle Jem, a sea captain. Jessie has raised four sons – Archie, Will, Geordie, Jamie – almost without the assistance of her husband, who is always away at sea. Steady, wise, and loving, Jessie is Rose's favorite aunt and the nearest substitute she has to a mother. Jessie is the aunt most trusted by Rose's guardian, Uncle Alec.

=== The Campbell brothers, uncles of Rose and nephews of Aunts Peace and Plenty ===
- Alec: The principal male character. A seafaring doctor, he became Rose's guardian when her father George died. He has never married; we are led to assume that the great love of his life was Rose's mother, who chose to marry George. Alec has "advanced" ideas about child-rearing, which he implements in so gentle and loving a fashion that Rose is restored to health and happiness in spite of her fears. The aunts are nervous about (or even opposed to) some of Alec's ideas, but they come to trust him implicitly.
- Mac: Married to Jane and father to Rose's cousins Mac and Steve. He is engaged in the China trade and has a warehouse on the bay. A trifle henpecked by his wife, he spends most of his time in his counting-house. He is very fond of Rose and secretly hopes that she will marry one of his sons.
- Jem (James): Married to Jessie and father to Rose's cousins Archie, Will, Geordie, and Jamie.
- Stephen: Married to Clara and father to Rose's cousin Charlie. His profession is never specified. Living in India, he never makes an appearance in Eight Cousins.
- George: Recently deceased father of Rose. Uncle Alec and he "fell out" because they loved the same woman. Years later they met and made up, and George asked Alec to look after Rose if anything happened to him.

=== The Campbell cousins, in order of age ===
- Archibald (Archie): Eldest son of Jem and Jessie. Eldest of all the cousins at age 16, of steady and thoughtful character, he is the Chief, much respected by all the boys and an "older brother" figure to Rose.
- Charles C. (Charlie): Also known as Prince Charlie, the "flower of the family," considered the most handsome, talented, and promising of the lot. Age 16. He is the spoiled only child of Stephen and Clara. Charlie and Archie are inseparable friends and lead the way in all exploits.
- Alexander Mackenzie (Mac): Elder son of Mac and Jane. Age 15. Known as the Bookworm, or simply "the Worm," Mac always has his nose in a book and is regarded as the wisest and most learned of the cousins, although deficient in basic social skills through absent-mindedness and lack of interest.
- Stephen (Steve): Mac's younger brother. Age 14. A good-natured though rather conceited dandy, he idolizes Charlie and copies him in everything.
- William (Will): Jem and Jessie's second son. Age 12.
- George (Geordie): Jem and Jessie's third son. Age 11.
- James (Jamie): Jem and Jessie's youngest. Age 6.
- Pokey: Jamie's "doll", a little girl cousin, Age 3.

=== Other characters ===
- Phebe Moore: Housemaid of Aunts Plenty and Peace, a girl from the poor house, who is employed on trial at the opening of the story. Lonely Rose befriends Phebe and then "adopts" her as a sister, teaches her improvements in reading and writing skills, admires Phebe's marked musical talent and upright character, and includes her in all aspects of her life as Phebe becomes her personal maid.
- Debbie(also called Dolly later in the book in some editions): Bad-tempered but good-hearted cook in Aunt Plenty's household.
- Annabelle Bliss( earlier editions called her Adriana Blish): Friend of Rose. She is "the model child of the neighborhood," daughter of a prominent Boston family whom the aunts consider suitable for Rose to know; however Rose can't bear her. Alcott frequently satirized fashionable, empty-headed girls in her novels.
- Mother Atkinson: Kindly doyenne of the wholesome mountain household (location unspecified, but probably in Maine or New Hampshire), known as Cosey Corner, where Rose and various family members spend several memorable summers.
- Fun See: A Chinese boy who has come to America to be educated in a western school.
- Whang Lo: An elderly Chinese merchant who does business with Uncle Mac Campbell; he wears Western dress and speaks good English.

The Alcotts themselves would summer in a location called "Happy Corner" in Walpole, New Hampshire, but the description of "Cosy Corner" places it within walking distance of Mount Washington, very likely in Intervale. In the 19th century, New Englanders who could afford it went to the mountains or the seashore for the fresher, cooler air considered sovereign for physical and mental complaints.

== Background ==
Eight Cousins was serialized December 1874–November 1875 in Good Things: A Picturesque Magazine for the Young of All Ages. From January–October 1875 it appeared in St. Nicholas. Eight Cousins was Alcott's first serialized novel in St. Nicholas; she had previously published a short story in the magazine. Because the book was too long for the St. Nicholas serial, Alcott offered to remove two chapters that could later be included when the story was published in book form. The book edition, published by the Roberts Brothers, was available in the latter part of 1875 with illustrations from various artists. In 1927 it was published by Little, Brown and included illustrations by Harriet Longstreet Price, then in 1948 as a Rainbow Classic with illustrations by C. B. Falls. Ethel H. Freeman adapted the book into a play in 1934.

Three companies contended for publication rights of Eight Cousins before it was written. Alcott wrote, "I rather enjoyed it, and felt important with Roberts, Low, and Scribner all clamoring for my 'umble works." One of the novel's minor characters, who Rose dislikes, was originally named after Alcott's childhood acquaintance Ariadne Blish. Blish was concerned about Alcott's use of her name. Caroline Healey Dall told this to Alcott, who clarified that Ariadne "was a very well behaved child who was held up to naughty Louisa as a model girl." Afterward Alcott changed the character's name to Annabel Bliss.

== Plot ==
Thirteen-year-old Rose Campbell is a sickly orphan who attended boarding school for a year after her father died. She now lives with her great aunts, Plenty and Peace, at the Aunt Hill and is heiress to a large fortune. Aunt Plenty gives Rose several medications because of her sickliness. After a week of living there, she meets and befriends the housemaid, Phebe Moore and adopts her as a sister. Rose tries to avoid meeting her seven boy cousins, who are known as the clan. Their names are Archie, Charlie, Mac, Steve, Will, Geordie, and Jamie, and they are the sons of her four other aunts. The next morning, Rose meets her uncle, who is a doctor and her guardian. He throws her medication out the window and says he is in charge of her health. Later Uncle Alec and the aunts discuss what to do with Rose. Aunt Jane thinks that Rose should have been kept in boarding-school; Aunt Clara thinks she should be put in a finishing-school for a year and then sent into society; Aunt Myra thinks Rose will die; and Aunt Jessie agrees with Alec, who wants to improve Rose's health for a year before letting her decide with whom to live. Rose wants to adopt Phebe as her sister, but cannot until she is older. One day Uncle Alec tells Rose to run around the garden. Afterward, he tells her to loosens her belt to make it easier for her to breathe

Rose and Uncle Alec take his boat to Uncle Mac's dock. There, they meet two Chinese gentleman, Whang Lo and Fun See, the latter of whom entertains Rose with things he has brought from China. For the Fourth of July Uncle Alec, Rose, and the clan camp on a nearby island. Wanting Phebe to participate, Rose leaves the last day of the camping trip; she sends Phebe to the island and does Phebe's chores at home. Mac, from studying outside all day on the camping-trip, gets a sunstroke. After this, his eyes give out from reading. Because he is consigned to a dark room for a long time and forbidden to read, Rose reads to him. The Clan disturbs Mac in his rest, and after a scolding from Rose, decide to be more helpful. To help Mac with his boredom, Uncle Alec sends Mac, Rose, Aunt Jessie, Jamie, and two friends to the mountain village of Cosey Corner to stay with a woman named Mother Atkinson. Jamie and his friend join The Cosey Corner Light Infantry, whose members are the neighborhood children. On Rose's fourteenth birthday she falls off a horse going to meet Uncle Alec and sprains her ankle. While her ankle heals, Mac and The Cosey Corner Light Infantry entertain her with skits.

At Uncle Alec's recommendation, Aunt Plenty teaches Rose how to bake bread and Aunt Peace teaches her how to sew. One afternoon Rose discovers Charlie and Archie smoking and encourages them to quit, then Aunt Jessie has Will and Geordie burn their yellow-back novels. Although Uncle Alec discourages Rose from the professional study of medicine, he educates her in physiology so she can take charge of her own health. During the family Christmas dinner Archie's father Uncle Jem shows up after being at sea for several years. In February Rose contracts pneumonia while waiting for Mac in the cold. When Charlie finds out, he chastises Mac. Feeling remorseful, Mac visits Rose in her room in the middle of the night and begs for forgiveness, which she grants. Still recovering, Rose gives Phebe some schooling. Later, Archie and Charlie have an argument about Charlie's choice of friends, and Rose resolves it by encouraging both boys to apologize. Now having lived at the Aunt Hill with Uncle Alec for a year, Rose is free to choose with whom to live. Because she has come to love him, Rose chooses to stay with Uncle Alec.

== Reception ==
Eight Cousins was Alcott's last work to receive major critical attention. The Daily Graphic praised it as "the best book" Alcott wrote. The Boston Daily Advertiser praised its moral lessons of obedience and kindness, while The Literary World criticized its "vague kind of didacticism" and claimed that Rose was an unrealistic character and that her eventual good health was unrealistic. The Daily Evening Traveller called Rose a "beautiful" character and her cousins "lifelike". The New York Tribune opined that Little Women was a better book. In reference to the illustrations, the Springfield Daily Republican noted differences in their quality. Henry James wrote a review of Eight Cousins in The Nation that called it an "unhappy amalgam of the novel and the story-book". He called Alcott "clever" but felt her "satirical tone" in the novel was not appropriate for children. Specifically, he felt that Alcott's portrayal of the adults would foster disrespect in children. James disliked the novel's realism, thinking that Alcott should have included elements of fantasy. Feeling that Louisa Alcott broke barriers of class-based prejudice, her father Bronson Alcott commended her "sympathy with the lower and laboring class" in Eight Cousins.

When Aunt Jessie convinces Will and Geordie to give up their yellow-back books, she explains that she feels they are unfit for children. William Taylor Adams saw this conversation as a criticism of his Oliver Optic's Magazine, claiming that the arguments against the magazine were inaccurate. In response, The Literary World wrote that it was improper for literary rivals to criticize each other, saying that Adams was impolite and that Alcott had no "right to complain of his prompt retaliation."

== Major themes ==
=== Education and health ===
Critics of Eight Cousins view Uncle Alec as exemplary of Alcott's views on children's education as informed by transcendentalism, which favored an untraditional education. Uncle Alec educates Rose at home, not in traditional subjects but in skills such as domestic governance and physical health. As the child of transcendentalist Bronson Alcott, Louisa Alcott's education was similar to what is outlined in Eight Cousins. Alec's methods may also be informed by John Dewey's constructivism, in which students are active participants in the learning process. According to Liberal Studies professor Cathlin Davis, learning was not "hands-on" in the traditional schools of Alcott's time and says that Uncle Alec's method uses "active learning." As part of this, Rose and Alec visit Uncle Mac's warehouse, and she learns about "navigation, geography, grammar, arithmetic, and keeping [her] temper". Rose and Phebe participate in peer-to-peer education; while Rose helps Phebe with reading, Phebe helps her with arithmetic. Her education under Alec involves little book-learning, which reflects Bronson Alcott's ideas of education. Rose expresses that she is "almost dead with lessons" from boarding school and says she learns better a little at a time.

In the preface to the first edition of Eight Cousins, Alcott wrote of Alec's educational and health methods, "Uncle Alec's experiment was intended to amuse the young folks, rather than suggest educational improvements for the consideration of the elders." This statement was contradicted in her letters. English professor Ruth DyckFehderau argues that despite Alcott's preface, she is suggesting education reforms. Alec's methods were not unusual, since other children's books of the time addressed similar topics and other people recommended similar health methods.

Aunt Plenty's physiological understanding of the female sex informs her treatment of Rose's health, such as giving her several medications; it is based on the idea that women have fragile health. Through Alec's profession as a doctor, Alcott spoke against this common perception. Alec seeks to improve Rose's health by giving her milk and oatmeal, by getting rid of her medicines, and by keeping her from wearing corsets.

=== Child-rearing ===
Claudia Mills argues that Eight Cousins is a commentary on how children should be raised in the home. The goal of the aunts and uncles is to decide whose child-rearing methods are the best for Rose. Four of her aunts have different approaches to how children should be raised. Myra is a hypochondriac who overdosed and killed her daughter Caroline with medication. Jane believes in rigorous education for children and ignores her sons because of her housekeeping. Clara views childhood as a time to prepare for fashionable society, which Alcott criticizes. Jessie, who believes children should learn "self-sacrifice", is a female mother figure but is not as prominent as Alec. Alec's methods of child-rearing include health and education reforms. Rose choosing to live with Alec at the end shows her favor of his child-rearing methods.

DyckFehderau points out that fathers do not take a prominent role in the book and suggests that Alec is both a father and a mother figure. Alec's motherhood role, according to DyckFehderau, does not diminish 19th century feminism. Alcott viewed men and women as equal, and creating a male mother figure allowed her to remove gendered roles in Rose's household. In her other books Alcott attributes happiness or unhappiness in family life to the mother, possibly because of the social perception that mothers were responsible for morality within the home. Rose's well-being at the end of the novel is attributed to Alec. English professor Claudia Nelson argues that Alec's child-rearing methods are more important to him than Rose is, claiming that Alcott hints at this same idea. One example Nelson gives is when both Mac and Alec are held accountable for Rose's pneumonia from sitting in the cold.

=== Class and social "othering" ===
Class distinctions in Eight Cousins are manifest in interactions between Rose and Phebe. Rose tries to "cross the class barrier" by befriending Phebe, professor of children's literature Kristina West explains. Rose later adopts Phebe as her sister, giving her the opportunity to extend charity. As part of the serving class, Phebe does not receive an education. Rose seeks to help Phebe with her education, dissolving class distinctions. This peer-to-peer education is stopped when Alec sends Phebe to school. To Phebe, chores are a duty, but to Rose, chores are a form of amusement.

According to West, Rose is set up as "other" from her aunts and cousins due to generational and behavioral differences. Rose must get used to the Campbell "culture" because she has been kept from knowing the family her entire life, explains English professor Lordina Cohoon. Cohoon claims that Rose's frequent association with Chinese objects, such as those Alec gives her from his voyages to China, is paralleled with her foreignness as a female among male cousins. Through his child-rearing methods, Uncle Alec takes Rose from being foreign to her family to being an active participant in the Campbell family.

== Works cited ==
- Cheney, Edna Dow (2010). Louisa May Alcott: Her Life, Letters, and Journals. Carlisle, Massachusetts: Applewood Books. ISBN 978-1-4290-4460-8.
- Clark, Beverly Lyon, ed. (2004). "Eight Cousins (1875)". Louisa May Alcott: The Contemporary Reviews. Cambridge University Press. ISBN 0-521-82780-9.
- Cohoon, Lorinda B. (2008). "'A Highly Satisfactory Chinaman': Orientalism and American Girlhood in Louisa May Alcott's Eight Cousins". Children's Literature. 36. Johns Hopkins University Press: 49–71. doi:10.1353/chl.0.0018 – via Project MUSE.
- Davis, Cathlin M. (2011). "An Easy and Well-Ordered Way to Learn: Schooling at Home in Louisa May Alcott's Eight Cousins and Jack and Jill". Children's Literature in Education. 42 (4): 340–353. doi:10.1007/s10583-011-9136-1 – via Springer Link.
- DyckFehderau, Ruth (1999). "Moral Pap and Male Mothers: The Political Subtexts of Louisa May Alcott's 'Eight Cousins or, The Aunt Hill'". Legacy. 16 (2). University of Nebraska Press: 154–167. JSTOR 25679300.
- Hamblen, Abigail Ann (1970). "Louisa May Alcott and the "Revolution" in Education". The Journal of General Education. 22 (2). Penn State University Press: 81–92. JSTOR 27796204.
- Maibor, Carolyn R. (2006). "Upstairs, Downstairs, and In-Between: Louisa May Alcott on Domestic Service". The New England Quarterly. 79 (1): 65–91. JSTOR 20474412.
- Mills, Claudia (1989). "Choosing a Way of Life: 'Eight Cousins' and 'Six to Sixteen'". Children's Literature Association Quarterly. 14 (2). Johns Hopkins University Press: 71–75. doi:10.1353/chq.0.0825 – via Project MUSE.
- Nelson, Claudia (1988). "Family Circle or Vicious Circle?: Anti-Paternal Undercurrents in Louisa May Alcott". Children's Literature Association Quarterly. 1988 (1). Johns Hopkins University Press: 70–76. doi:10.1353/chq.1988.0003 – via Project MUSE.
- Shealy, Daniel (2004). "'Work Well Done':Louisa May Alcott and Mary Mapes Dodge". In Gannon, Susan R.; Rahn, Suzanne; Thompson, Ruth Anne (eds.). St. Nicholas and Mary Mapes Dodge: The Legacy of a Children's Magazine Editor, 1873–1905. McFarland and Company, Inc. pp. 171–178. ISBN 978-0-7864-1758-2.
- Stern, Madeleine B. Stern (1977). "Louisa M. Alcott in Periodicals". Studies in the American Renaissance. 1. Twayne Publishers: 369–386. JSTOR 30227439.
- Stern, Madeleine B. (1985). "Louisa Alcott's Self-Criticism". Studies in the American Renaissance: 333–382. JSTOR 30227539.
- Ullom, Judith C., ed. (1969). Louisa May Alcott: An Annotated, Selected Bibliography. Washington, D.C.: Library of Congress. pp. 46–49.
- West, Kristina (2020). Louisa May Alcott and the Textual Child: A Critical Theory Approach. London: Palgrave Macmillan. doi:10.1007/978-3-030-39025-9. ISBN 978-3-030-39025-9.
- Williamson, Beata (2017). "Henry James, Louisa May Alcott, and the Child". Beyond Philology (14/3): 113–129 – via Knowledge Base of the University of Gdansk.
- Zehr, Janet S. (1987). "The Response of Nineteenth-Century Audiences to Louisa May Alcott's Fiction". American Transcendental Quarterly. 1 (4). Kingston, Rhode Island: 323–342. ProQuest 1302500928.
