= Candle Creek =

- Location of the mouth of Candle Creek in Alaska
- Native name: Kuugaaluk (Inupiaq)

Location
- Country: United States
- State: Alaska
- City: Candle

Physical characteristics
- Source
  - location: Alaska
  - coordinates: 65°54′52″N 161°55′11″W

Basin features
- River system: Kiwalik River

Candle Creek (Iñupiaq: Kuugaaluk) is a western tributary of the Kiwalik River, located on the Seward Peninsula of the U.S. state of Alaska. The unincorporated community of Candle is less than a mile away, while the village of Kiwalik is about 13 miles (21 km) away. The creek's name is attributed to the resemblance of the trees on the banks of the creek to candles when they are covered with snow. With the discovery of gold in 1901, Candle Creek's reputation as a top gold-yielding site was fixed.

== Geography ==
Candle Creek is situated at the head of the main divide between the north and south drainages of the Seward Peninsula. It follows a north-northeast course, joining Kiwalik River at Candle, 6 miles (9.7 km) above the head of Spafarief Bay. It is 9 miles (14 km) south of the sand pit on which the village of Kiwalik is situated. The stream occupies a broad, shallow valley with only mildly sloping sides, making its movement more difficult. In addition to gold, other minerals found include arsenopyrite, pyrite, galena, chalcopyrite, magnetite, ilmenite, rutile, zircon, garnet, and cerussite. Bean and Blank creeks are eastern tributaries, while Jump, Patterson, Potato, Ptarmigan, Thomas, and Willow creeks are western tributaries.

== Geology ==
In 1901, placer gold was discovered on Candle Creek both in the river bed and the valley. The geological setting of the valley is attributed to late Precambrian, early Paleozoic eras. Quartz, mica and schists are the formations recorded, marked by quartz stringers and granitic dikes. The river bed is of schist bedrock which is covered by a thick mantle of 12–18 feet (3.7–5.5 m) of gold-bearing creek gravels. The valley is covered is with 10–20 feet (3.0–6.1 m) of ice, overburden, rock falls, and tundra vegetation. Placer gold finds are covered by iron oxide in the form of dark organic matter. Gold was also discovered in gravel in ironstone concretions. Other minerals found in placer gold are arsenopyrite, large amount of pyrite, galena, chalcopyrite, ilmenite, rutile, garnet, cerussite and sometimes also magnetite.

== Mining history ==
Soon after the discovery of gold at Nome, prospectors explored the more readily accessible streams of Seward Peninsula. Candle Creek was staked in July 1901, by Enos Thomas, Alexander Patterson, Robert W. Snyder, and James Blankenship. Although Blankenship was probably the first miner to drive stakes on Candle Creek, the other three men were the first to enter the region. They are credited as the original discoverers of gold on Jump Creek, a small tributary which originates from the west and joins Candle Creek, about 1.5 miles (2.4 km) above Kiwalik River. These four men staked claims on the most promising portions of the main stream, each staking one claim on the lower ends of the tributaries, thus acquiring rights to a considerable amount of ground. Other miners arrived within a few months. During the summer of 1902, mining occurred between Potato Creek and Kiwalik River, resulting in a large amount of the easily extractable gold being recovered. In the following year, prospecting decreased. About twelve small plants were at work in 1916–17 on Candle Creek and its tributaries. Placer mining, including dredging, boomed till the 1950s. According to reported figures, the gold mined in the creek was more than 600,000 ounces. Candle Creek's name is derived from a natural phenomenon noted by the mining prospectors during the spring months, when the snow-covered twigs on the creek bank resemble candles.
