= Kiwalik, Alaska =

Unincorporated community in the state of Alaska, United States

Kiwalik
- unincorporated community
- Location within the state of Alaska
- Coordinates: 66°01′22″N 161°50′31″W
- Country: United States
- State: Alaska
- Borough: Northwest Arctic

Government
  - Borough mayor: Clement Richards, Sr.
  - State senator: Donny Olson (D)
  - State rep.: Dean Westlake (D)
- Time zone: UTC-9 (Alaska (AKST))
  - Summer (DST): UTC-8 (AKDT)
- GNIS feature ID: 1413351

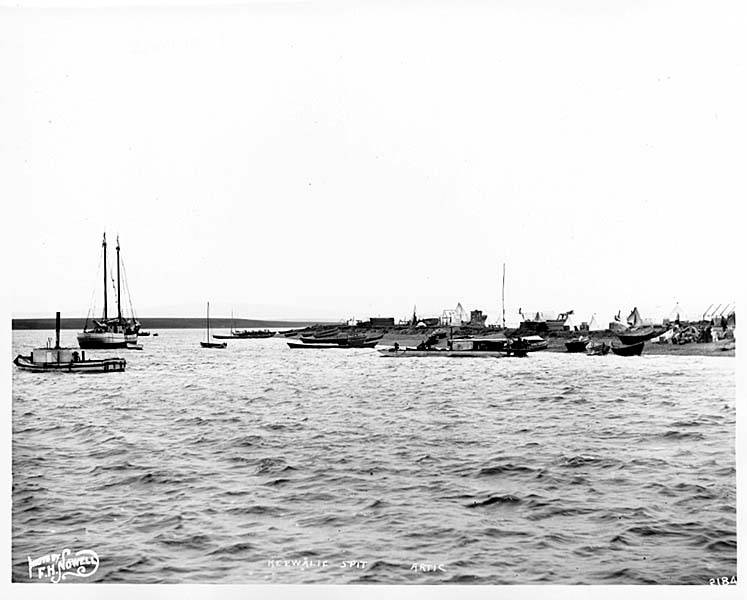
Kiwalik Spit

Kiwalik (sometimes written Keewalik) is an unincorporated community in the Northwest Arctic Borough in the U.S. state of Alaska. It is located where the Kiwalik River flows into Kotzebue Sound on the Seward Peninsula, 97 km (60 mi) south of Kotzebue.

Kiwalik was once a small community that supported mining operations at Candle, 7 miles (11 km) away on the Kiwalik River, by Candle Creek. It is now used only by subsistence hunters and travelers who stop to use the public shelter cabin on the public road (Kiwalik-Candle route) to access the graveyard, which is surrounded by private property. The community is now abandoned and dilapidated, filled with rusty hulks, trash and broken down buildings.

The Kiwalik river area is often featured on the National Geographic Channel series Life Below Zero as one of the places the Hailstone family visits for hunting and gathering, thus demonstrating the subsistence skills necessary for life in this landscape and climate.

== Demographics ==
Historical population
Census	Pop.	Note	%±
1880	12		—
1930	12		—
1940	24		100.0%
U.S. Decennial Census

Kiwalik first reported on the 1880 U.S. Census as an unincorporated Inuit village of "Kugalukmute." It did not appear on the census again until 1930, when it reported as "Keewalik." It reported again as Keewalik in 1940. It has not reported separately since.

The "Kugalukmute" were the people on the Kuguruk river, (kugurukmuit) the river just to Kiwalik rivers west.
