= Rose in Bloom =

1876 novel by Louisa May Alcott

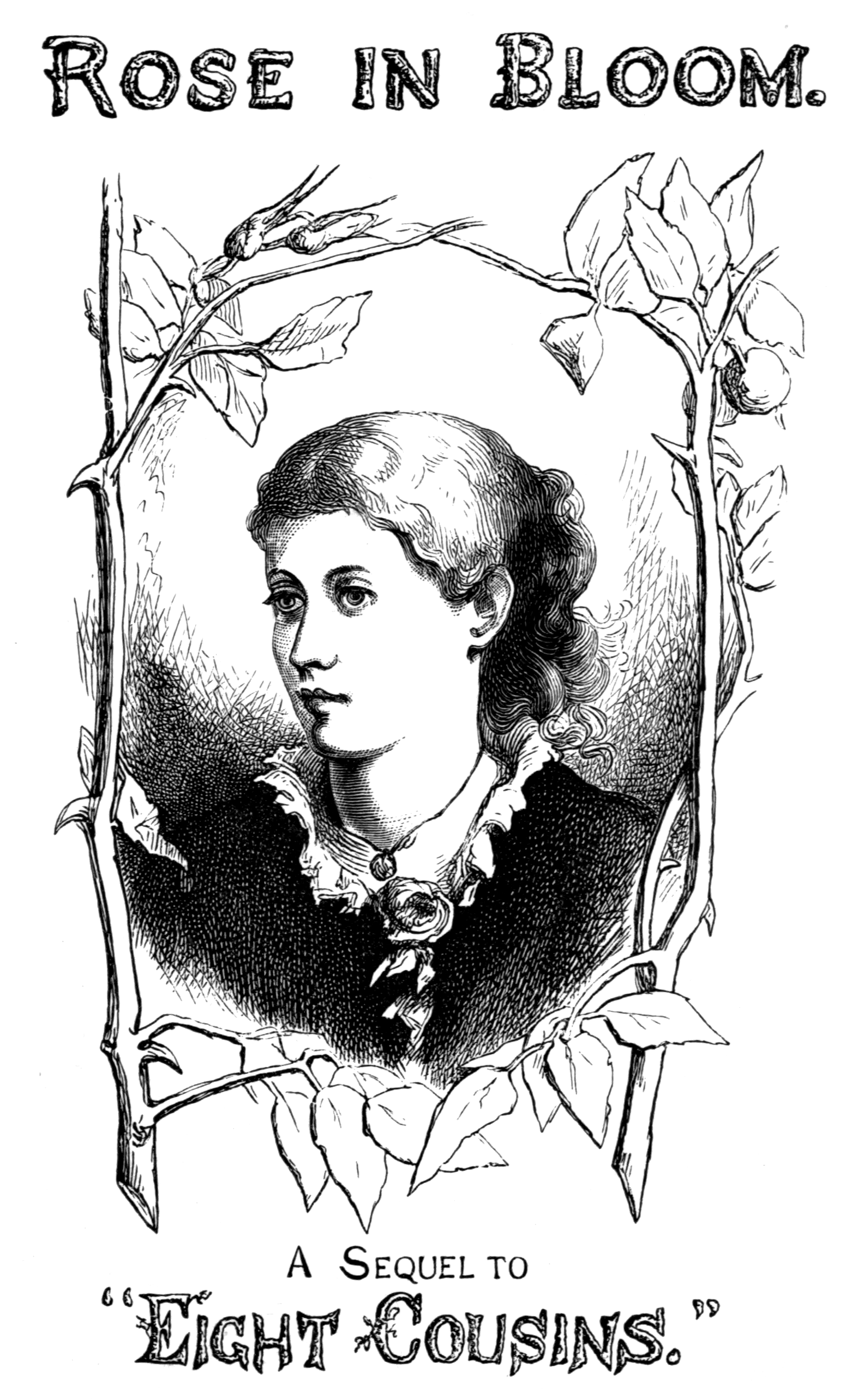
- First edition frontispiece
- Author: Louisa May Alcott
- Language: English
- Publisher: Roberts Brothers
- Publication date: 1876
- Publication place: United States
- Media type: Print
- Preceded by: Eight Cousins

Rose in Bloom is a novel by Louisa May Alcott published in 1876 and is a sequel to Eight Cousins. It depicts the story of a nineteenth-century girl, Rose Campbell, finding her way in society, seeking a profession in philanthropy, and finding a marriage partner. Considered enjoyable by some readers and dull by others, the novel received generally positive reviews. Its themes include philanthropy, independence in women, the impact of society, and class differences.

== Publication history and adaptations ==
Alcott took three weeks to write Rose in Bloom while taking care of her mother, Abba Alcott, and finished it in September 1876. It was published by the Roberts Brothers in November. Little, Brown and Company republished it in 1919 with one illustration by Frank Thayer Merrill. In 1927 it was published by the same company with color illustrations by Hattie Longstreet Price. In 1935 John D. Ravold published a play adaptation of the novel and called it Rose in Bloom: A Play in Three Acts, from the Book by Louisa M. Alcott. The play takes place in 1885 in one room of the Campbell house.

== Plot ==
The story begins when Rose returns home from a years-long trip to Europe. While Rose spends the evening with her cousins, the youngest cousin, Jamie, accidentally mentions that the aunts want Rose to marry one of her cousins to keep her fortune in the family. Rose is indignant, declaring that she can manage her property well on her own and that she will focus on philanthropic work. Phebe also comes home, no longer the servant that Rose "adopted" but as a young woman with a cultured singing ability, having formally studied music. Rose challenges anyone who would look down on Phebe. Phebe is readily accepted as part of the Campbell family until Rose's cousin Archie falls in love with her; the family feel that Archie would be marrying beneath himself. Phebe, whose pride and debt to the family make her wish to prove herself before she will accept Archie's proposal, leaves the Campbells' home and sets off to make a name for herself as a singer to try to earn the Campbell's respect.

After some time at home, Rose comes out into society, though Uncle Alec is hesitant because he fears it will have a negative impact on her. She promises to try high society for only three months. During that time, she and her cousin Steve teach Steve's brother Mac how to dance and dress properly for social events. Mac is grudging, but he eventually learns how to be a gentleman. Meanwhile, another cousin Charlie decides, with his mother's blessing, that he will marry Rose. As he courts her, she begins to give in to his charm. He derails the budding romance by coming to her house late one night, very drunk, which ruins her respect for him. After her three months of society are over, Rose begins to focus on her philanthropic projects and convinces Charlie to refrain from alcohol and achieve temperance in order to win her love and respect. With the help of Uncle Alec, she tries to help Charlie, but fails. Charlie's life ends in an alcohol-induced accident on the eve of a voyage to India to see his father and join his business. Although Rose was never in love with Charlie, she hoped that he would improve his habits so they could see what relationship they could develop.

Shortly after Charlie's death, Mac brings Rose a three-year-old orphan whose mother recently died at the hospital; Rose adopts the child and names her Dulce. Several months later, Rose finds out that Mac is in love with her. She has never thought of him as anything but a bookworm and refuses his love, but she declares deep respect for him. This gives Mac hope, and he goes to medical school, willing to wait for her. She is touched by his devotion and begins to see him clearly for the first time, realizing that he is the man she wants to marry. He publishes a small book of poetry to wide critical success, earning her respect even more deeply. His absence while at medical school helps her realize she loves him.

While Rose discovers her romantic feelings for Mac, Steve and his sweetheart, Kitty, become engaged. Kitty, who looks to Rose for sisterly guidance, is willing to follow Rose's advice on improving her mind. The Campbells reach a crisis when Uncle Alec becomes dangerously sick while visiting Mac. Phebe nurses him back from the brink of death, at personal peril, and returns him to the anxious Campbells. She is greeted as a member of the family, sealing her own engagement with Archie with everyone's blessing. The homecoming is completed for Rose when she reunites with Mac and finally declares her love.

== Reception ==
Rose in Bloom received general positive reviews shortly after publication. The Literary World opined that Alcott's style improved, but mentioned a dislike of the novel's "sickly sentiment". Springfield Daily Republican said the book was "sufficiently sentimental" and praised it for being a "natural story". It also said that the book had "less moralizing" than usual. The Springfield Daily Union pointed out that Alcott included her common theme of females having a moral influence on others. The Providence Daily Journal said romance takes "undue proportion" in the plot, stating that the book is Alcott's closest approach to a romance novel. Hartford Daily Courant called Rose in Bloom "healthy", "fresh", and "delightful", while Lawrence Daily American praised the familial relationships. Boston Daily Advertiser also praised the familial love but said "[t]he story is rather dull to the reader".

== Themes ==
=== Philanthropy ===
For Rose, charity is a profession and a demonstration of her Christian beliefs. Charlie accuses Rose of performing philanthropic acts for show and not out of sincerity. Philanthropy was a common practice among Victorian women of high social status, and it appeared frequently in literature. Rose’s philanthropic acts are largely guided by Uncle Alec, who urges her to encourage financial independence in whom she aids. Author Claudia Mills describes Rose’s philanthropy as “an amateurish avocation” because she relies on others to tell her how to be charitable. One of Rose's role models is Abigail Gibbons, who accompanied Alcott on a charity tour preceding the novel's publication. Meanwhile, Rose expresses discouragement when her charitable deeds are not met with gratitude. Her dissatisfaction with philanthropy arises from the desire for fame, and she does not take philanthropy seriously until Charlie dies and Uncle Alec nearly dies. According to author Kristina West, her dissatisfaction also demonstrates Rose's middle-class expectations of how the poor should live. Additionally, Charlie is the object of Rose’s philanthropy, while Mac joins her in philanthropy by bringing an orphan to her, who she adopts. This makes Rose and Mac "partners in philanthropy" and demonstrates Rose's desire for having a family of her own.

=== Women's independence in society ===
Rose returns from Europe with a desire to pursue a profession and defend women's rights. Uncle Alec, who encourages Rose’s independence, has taught her to reject Victorian ideas of how a woman should act. As part of her desire to advocate independence for women, Rose takes an interest in improving conditions for poor women and does not want to marry until she has proven to herself that her abilities extend beyond the domestic sphere. Alcott biographer Ruth K. MacDonald states that because of Rose's social class, she already has independence and therefore does not need to be a passionate advocate for it, concluding that Rose's advocacy for women's rights belongs more to Alcott than to Rose. Rose expresses her desire for independence through her philanthropy. English professors Renu Goswami and Ritu Kumaran explain that philanthropy was viewed as an extension of women's virtues, so 19th-century women commonly used philanthropy to express their desire for independence in a socially acceptable manner. Phebe’s search for independence is different from Rose’s because Phebe must choose between her career and being accepted into the Campbell family. Because she is a poor orphan, Phebe is not accepted into the Campbell family until she makes a living for herself. Her eventual marriage to Archie brings an end to her vocation as a professional singer, contrasting with Rose’s belief in the compatibility of having both a profession and a family.

=== Social themes ===
Rose in Bloom takes a generally unfavorable stance on society. According to MacDonald, Alcott claims that being in society has led to Charlie’s alcoholism. When Charlie breaks his promise to Rose that he will stop drinking alcohol, he violates the Victorian belief that women are the means by which men become moral. During Rose’s time in society, she seeks to preserve her core values. She also discovers that people are attentive to her only because she is wealthy. Rose participates in society for three months and gives it up because she believes it is "seductive". Uncle Alec advises her to be careful in choosing associates and tells her the parable of the wheat and tares in the Bible, reminding her not to choose associates that will have a negative influence on her. Rose spends some of her time in society teaching Mac how to dress and act like a gentleman, ultimately shaping him into a suitable romantic partner for herself that resembles Uncle Alec.

Rose in Bloom also discusses class differences between Phebe and the Campbells. Alcott describes Phebe’s transition from Rose’s servant to her friend, and notes that Rose views Phebe as a member of the family. Phebe continues to consider Rose her mistress and serves her. Rose is oblivious to Phebe acting as her servant, and Alcott mentions that Phebe does not feel like Rose’s social equal. Young men find Phebe attractive but do not court her because she is a poor orphan, and people praise her for “keeping her place” in society. When Aunt Plenty finds out that Archie loves Phebe, she objects because she feels that Archie will not give the family his due by marrying her because she was taken from the poorhouse. Phebe also leaves because she does not want the Campbells to think she wants to marry him for a higher social status, and she decides not to return until she has something to sacrifice in order to do so. Because of her poverty, she is not considered a suitable match for Archie until she saves Uncle Alec’s life. For the Campbells, Phebe's care of Uncle Alec classifies her as "the deserving poor". Later, the Campbells attribute Phebe’s success in life to Rose, who befriended her when they were children.

== Works cited ==
- Cheney, Edna Dow (2010). Louisa May Alcott: Her Life, Letters, and Journals. Carlisle, Massachusetts: Applewood Books. ISBN 978-1-4290-4460-8.
- Clark, Beverly Lyon (2004). "Rose in Bloom (1876)". Louisa May Alcott: The Contemporary Reviews. Cambridge University Press. ISBN 978-0521827805.
- MacDonald, Ruth K. (1983). Louisa May Alcott. Boston, MA: Twayne Publishers. ISBN 0-8057-7397-5.
- Goldman, Suzy (1977). "Louisa May Alcott: The Separation Between Art and Family". The Lion and the Unicorn. 1 (2). Johns Hopkins University Press – via Project MUSE.
- Goswami, Renu; Kumaran, Ritu (2019a). "Transcending Victorian Cultural Image of the 'Angel Of House': Journey to Self-Actualization in Louisa May Alcott's Rose In Bloom" (PDF). International Journal of English and Literature. 9 (2): 67–70.
- Goswami, Renu; Kumaran, Ritu (2019b). "Strong Education and Strong Family as the Premise to Sound Grooming in the Novels of Jane Austen and Louisa May Alcott". International Journal of English Literature and Social Sciences. 4 (3): 825–829.
- Maibor, Carolyn R. (2006). "Upstairs, Downstairs, and In-Between: Louisa May Alcott on Domestic Service". The New England Quarterly. 79 (1): 65–91. JSTOR 20474412.
- Mills, Claudia (2006). "'The Canary and the Nightingale': Performance and Virtue in Eight Cousins and Rose in Bloom". Children's Literature. 34. Johns Hopkins University Press: 109–138 – via Project MUSE.
- Mo, Li (2016). "A Faith Truly Lived: Alcott's Use of Biblical Allusion in Eight Cousins and Rose in Bloom". In Eiselein, Gregory; Phillips, Anne K. (eds.). Critical Insights: Louisa May Alcott. Ipswich, MA: Salem Press. pp. 189–204. ISBN 978-1-61925-521-0.
- Nelson, Claudia (1988). "Family Circle or Vicious Circle?: Anti-Paternal Undercurrents in Louisa May Alcott". Children's Literature Association Quarterly. Johns Hopkins University Press: 70–76 – via Project MUSE.
- Payne, Alma J. (1980). Salzman, Jack (ed.). Louisa May Alcott: A Reference Guide. Boston, Massachusetts: G. K. Hall & Co. ISBN 0-8161-8032-6.
- Ullom, Judith C., ed. (1969). Louisa May Alcott: An Annotated, Selected Bibliography. Washington, D.C.: Library of Congress.
- Wadsworth, Sarah (2001). "Louisa May Alcott, William T. Adams, and the Rise of Gender-Specific Series Books". The Lion and the Unicorn. 25 (1). Johns Hopkins University Press: 17–46 – via Project MUSE.
- West, Kristina (2020). Louisa May Alcott and the Textual Child: A Critical Theory Approach. London, England: Palgrave Macmillan. doi:10.1007/978-3-030-39025-9. ISBN 978-3-030-39025-9.
