= Mary's Igloo, Alaska =

Human settlement in Alaska, United States

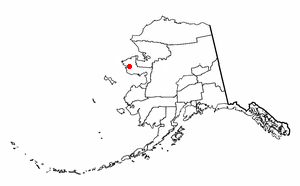
Map showing location in Alaska of Teller, the nearest community to Mary's Igloo.

Mary's Igloo (Qawiaraq or Aġviġnaq in Iñupiaq) is an abandoned village located in the Nome Census Area of the Unorganized Borough in the U.S. state of Alaska, now used as a fish camp. Many former residents and their descendants currently live in nearby Teller or the next largest community, Nome.

== History ==
The Inupiat village of Kauwerak was located about 15 miles (24 km) downriver from Mary's Igloo. By 1900, Kauwerak was abandoned and most of its residents moved to Teller or Nome because of schools and employment opportunities. A few settled at the site of Mary's Igloo, which they called Aukvaunlook (Aġviġnaq), meaning "black whale."

During the gold prospecting period of the early 1900s, non-Natives named the village "Mary's Igloo," after an Inupiaq woman named Mary, who welcomed miners, trappers and others into her home for coffee. During that period, Mary's Igloo was a transfer point for supplies for the gold fields upriver on the Kuzitrin and Kougarok rivers. The supplies were offloaded from ocean boats onto barges, which were towed to their destinations. A post office and store were opened at Mary's Igloo in 1901. By the 1910 census, Mary's Igloo was a community of 141 Inupiat and Anglo-Americans, who were miners, innkeepers, missionaries and support crews for the barges. It had schools, a post office and other services.

The flu epidemic of 1918 and 1919 and a tuberculosis epidemic, two years later, decimated the community's population. Catholic and Lutheran orphanages opened in the area to care for children left without parents.

The schools closed in 1948 and 1950 for lack of students and the post office and store also closed in 1952. Most of the residents moved to Nome or Teller.

The site of Mary's Igloo presently has no permanent population. It is used as a seasonal fish camp by some residents of Teller.

== Demographics ==
Historical population
Census	Pop.	Note	%±
1910	141		—
1920	115		−18.4%
1930	113		−1.7%
1940	114		0.9%
1950	64		−43.9%
1980	0		—
1990	0		—
2000	0		—
2010	0		—
U.S. Decennial Census

Mary's Igloo first appeared on the 1910 U.S. Census as "Igloo", an unincorporated village. It did not officially appear as Mary's Igloo until 1950. It did not appear again on the census until 1980, although the population was zero. It was classified as an Alaskan Native Village Statistical Area (ANVSA). It has not reported any residents since.

== Geography ==
Mary's Igloo is located at 65°09′N 165°04′W., on the northwest bank of the Kuzitrin River, on the Seward Peninsula. It is northeast of Nome and 60 km (40 mi) east of Teller.
