= Noxapaga River =

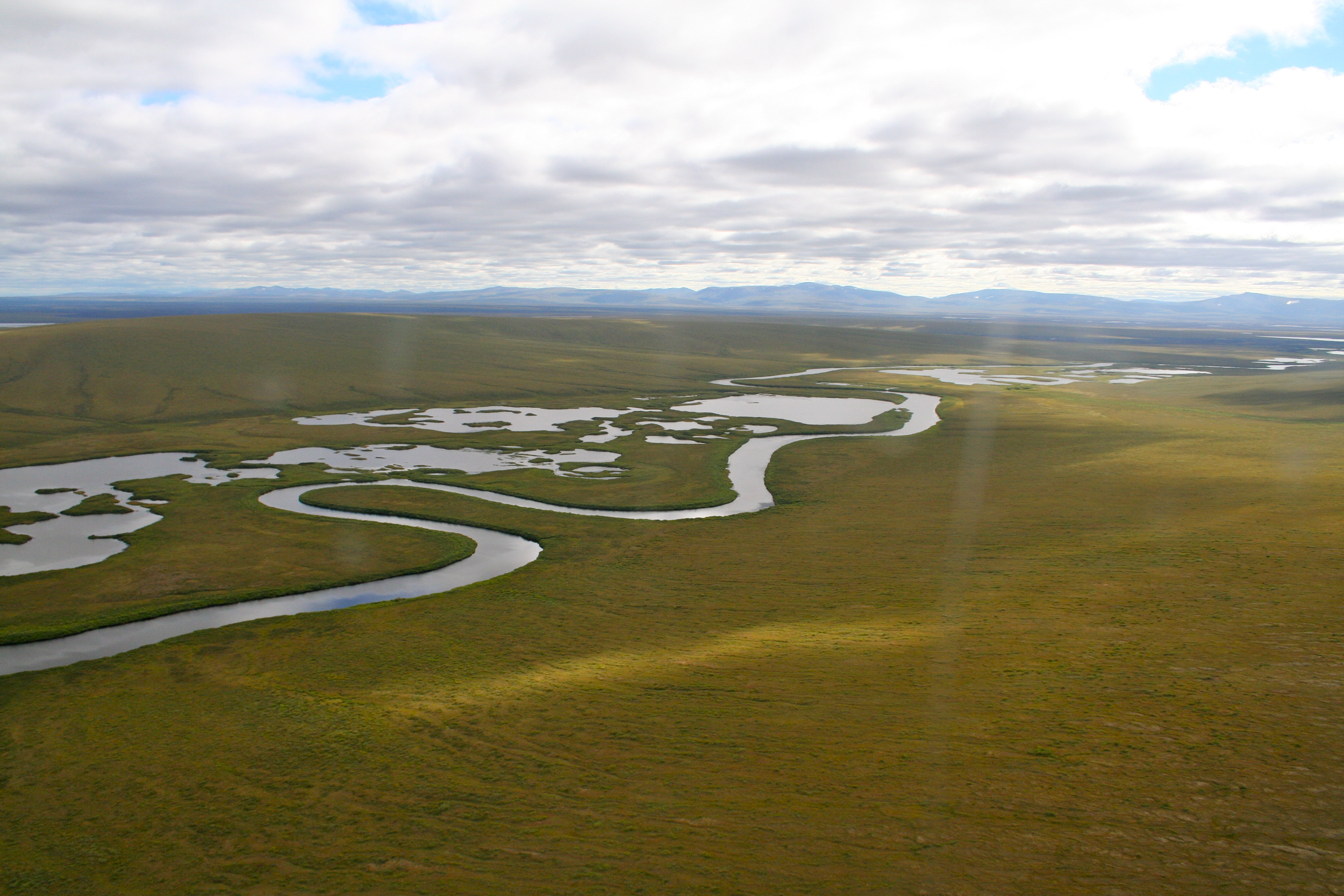

- Location of the mouth of the Noxapaga River in Alaska

Location
- Country: United States
- State: Alaska
- District: Northwest Arctic Borough, Nome Census Area

Physical characteristics
- Source: 9.5 miles (15.3 km) west of Imuruk Lake and 1.2 miles (1.9 km) northwest of Andromeda Cone
  - location: Bering Land Bridge National Preserve, Northwest Arctic Borough, Seward Peninsula
  - coordinates: 65°35′13″N 163°30′50″W
  - elevation: 946 ft (288 m)
- Mouth: Kuzitrin River
  - location: 15 miles (24 km) north-northwest of Mount Bendeleben, Nome Census Area
  - coordinates: 65°22′39″N 164°15′32″W
  - elevation: 102 ft (31 m)
- Length: 56 mi (90 km)

Noxapaga River (alternates: Kugrukruk and Kugirukuk) is a 56-mile (90 km) tributary of the Kuzitrin River on the Seward Peninsula in the U.S. state of Alaska. Heading in the Bering Land Bridge National Preserve, it flows northwest for 4 miles (6 km), then west for 22 miles (35 km), then south for 30 miles (48 km) to its mouth on the larger river. Tributaries include the creeks of Aurora, Berry, Black, Bluff, Boulder, Buzzard, Frost, Garfield, Goodall, Goose, Grouse, Last Chance, Little Garfield, Mascot, Money, Peuk, Stony, Turner, and Winona.

== Geography ==
Noxapaga River rises near Imuruk Lake and flows westward and southward, draining a total area of nearly 500 square miles (1,300 km^{2}) at its junction with the Kuzitrin in the flats. Its principal tributaries are East Fork and Berry, Aurora, and Turner creeks. It drains a plateau area, none of which reaches an elevation much greater than 2,000 feet (610 m). Most of the eastern portion of the drainage basin has been covered with a lava flow, and this portion furnishes practically all the discharge of the river at low water. The western portion of the drainage basin includes several streams on which mining operations have been conducted, especially Boulder Creek, a tributary of Turner Creek, where five or six claims were worked intermittently. The only ditch built in the Noxapaga basin has its intake on Turner Creek and extends around the rolling hills to the east for about 17 miles (27 km) to Goose Creek.

The river has a sinuous course across the valley lowland. About 8 miles (13 km) north of its junction with the Kuzitrin, the Noxapaga flows near the northern edge of the valley lowland. At this point, it receives a large tributary from the north, known as Turner Creek, where the settlement, Noxapaga, the recording office of the district, was located. Two miles above Turner Creek, the Noxapaga occupies a rather broad canyon cut to a depth of 50 feet (15 m) or more in a gravel-covered plain above the valley floor. About 8 miles (13 km) above Noxapaga settlement, the river forks, the branches being known as the East and West forks. Their upper waters lie in valleys incised in the higher plateau. Gold has been obtained from Garfield, Boulder, and Goose creeks.

== See also ==
- List of rivers of Alaska
