= Kuzitrin River =

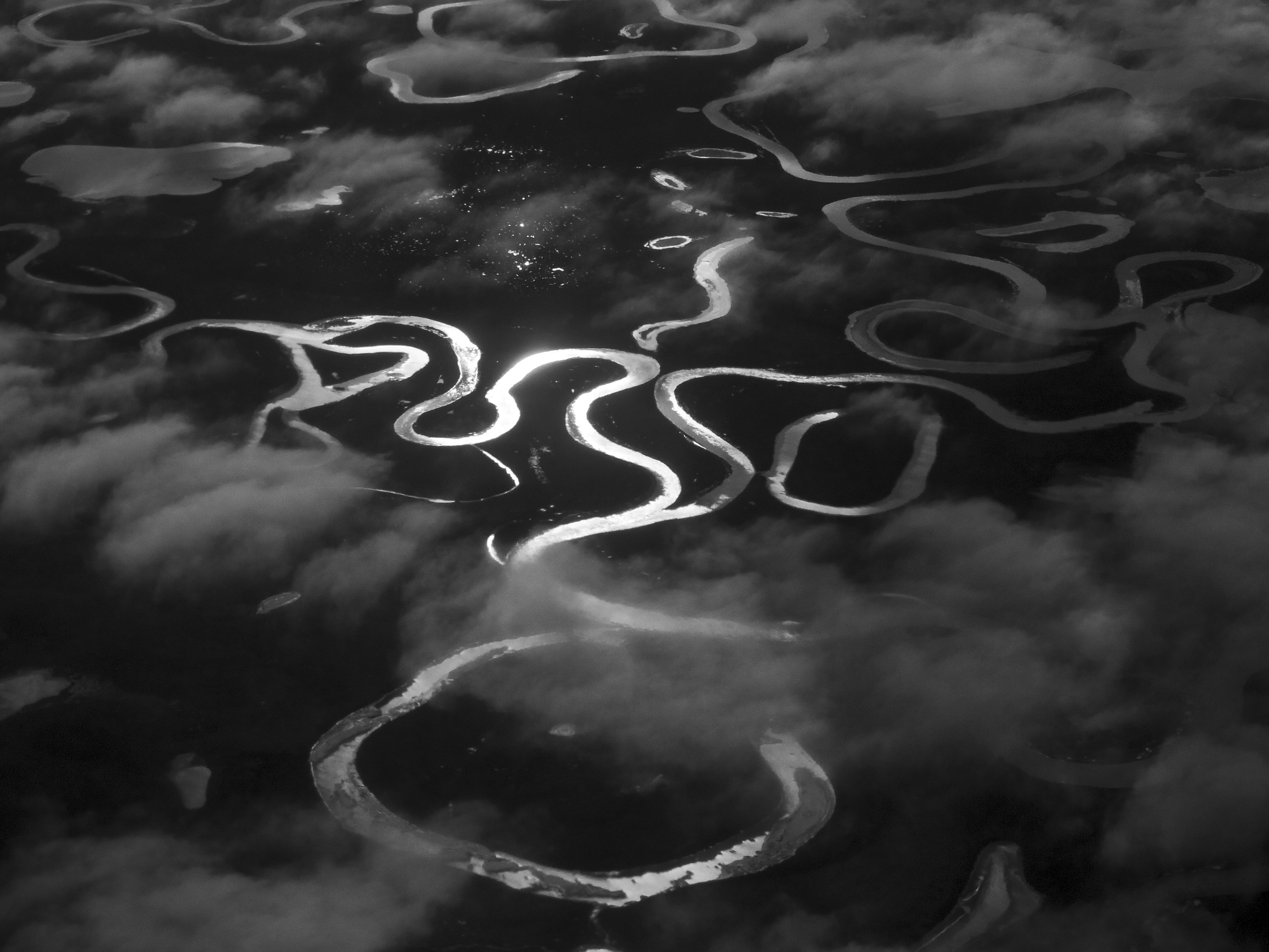

- Location of the mouth of the Kuzitrin River in Alaska
- Native name: Kurritqiun (Inupiaq)

Location
- Country: United States
- State: Alaska
- District: Nome Census Area

Physical characteristics
- Source: Kuzitrin Lake
  - location: 13 miles (21 km) south of Imuruk Lake, Seward Peninsula
  - coordinates: 65°26′59″N 163°48′43″W
  - elevation: 302 ft (92 m)
- Mouth: Imuruk Basin
  - location: 30 miles (48 km) southeast of Teller
  - coordinates: 65°10′03″N 165°25′12″W
  - elevation: 7 ft (2.1 m)
- Length: 95 mi (153 km)

The Kuzitrin River (Kurritqiun in Inupiaq) is a stream, 95 miles (153 km) long, on the Seward Peninsula in the U.S. state of Alaska. It begins at Kuzitrin Lake in the central region of the peninsula and flows 95 miles (153 km) west into the Imuruk Basin. The basin drains via the bay of Port Clarence to the Bering Sea. Kuzitrin tributaries include the Noxapaga, Kougarok, Kruzgamepa (Pilgrim), and Kugruk rivers.

The river's name, from Inupiaq, was recorded in 1900 by the United States Geological Survey. The United States Board on Geographic Names officially adopted the name in 1950.

There is one former village site on the lower Kuzitrin, at Mary's Igloo. The village is abandoned but is still used for subsistence activities by people from the nearby village of Teller.

== See also ==
- List of rivers of Alaska
