= Kougarok River =

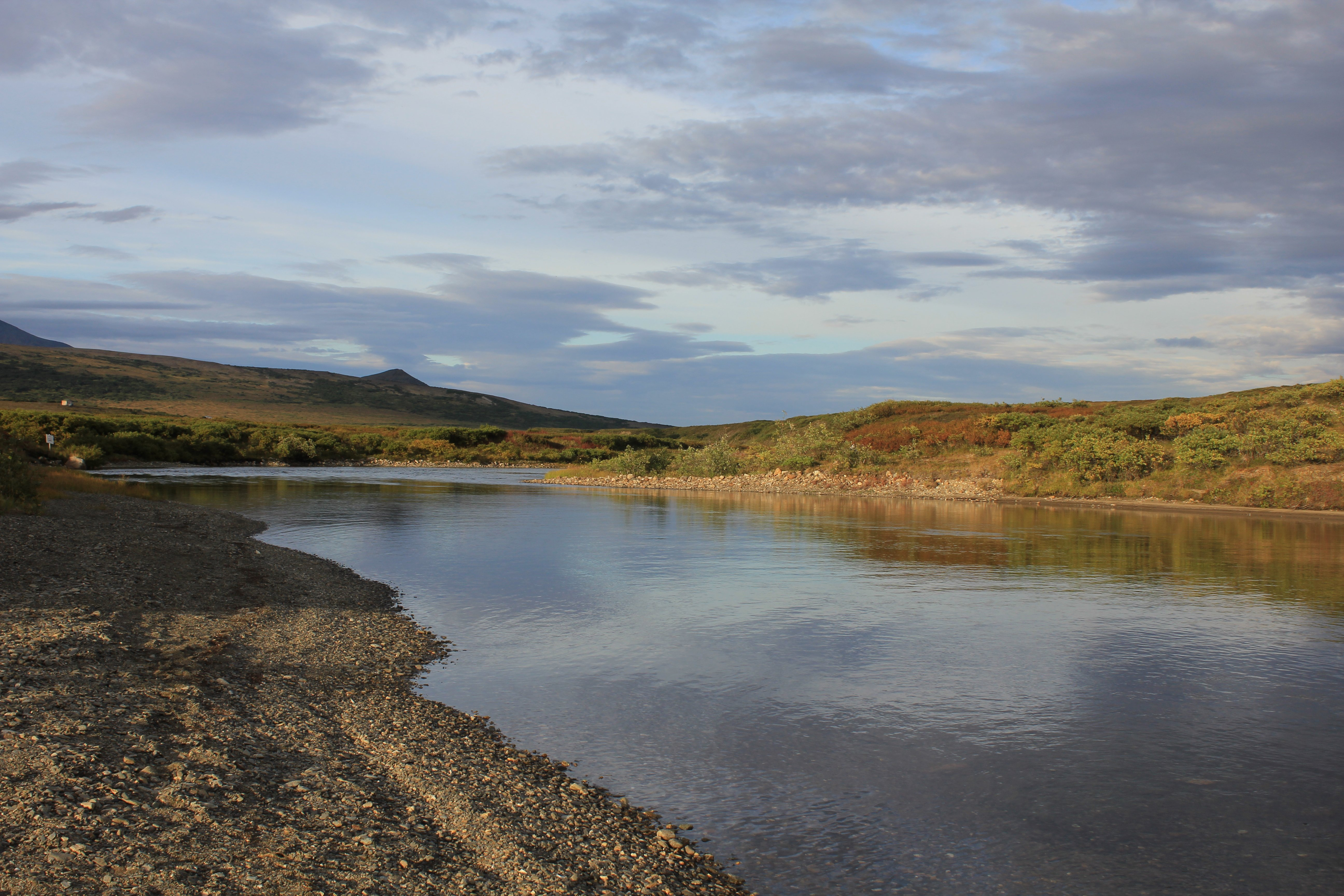
- Kougarok River

- Location of the mouth of the Kougarok River in Alaska
- Native name: Kuuguraq (Inupiaq)

Location
- Country: United States
- State: Alaska
- District: Nome Census Area

Physical characteristics
- Source: Confluence of Macklin and Washington creeks
  - location: Seward Peninsula
  - coordinates: 65°41′00″N 164°47′46″W
  - elevation: 457 ft (139 m)
- Mouth: Kuzitrin River
  - location: 47 miles (76 km) southwest of Imuruk Lake
  - coordinates: 65°15′23″N 164°33′57″W
  - elevation: 75 ft (23 m)
- Length: 45 mi (72 km)

The Kougarok (Koo-gah-rok) River (Kuuguraq in Inupiaq, lit. little river) is a river on the Seward Peninsula in the U.S. state of Alaska. Formed by the merger of the two smaller streams Macklin Creek and Washington Creek, the main stem is about 45 miles (72 km) long, flowing generally south from near Taylor Airport. It flows into the Kuzitrin River, which flows west into the Imuruk Basin, connected to the bay of Port Clarence on the Bering Sea.

In 1900 the river was reported under the same name as Kugruk River, this was later changed. The river drew gold miners in the early 1900s, though development slowed after World War II. The Nome-Taylor Highway follows the river for much of its course.

== See also ==
- List of rivers of Alaska
