= Scotty Allan =

Scottish-born American dog musher, businessman, and politician

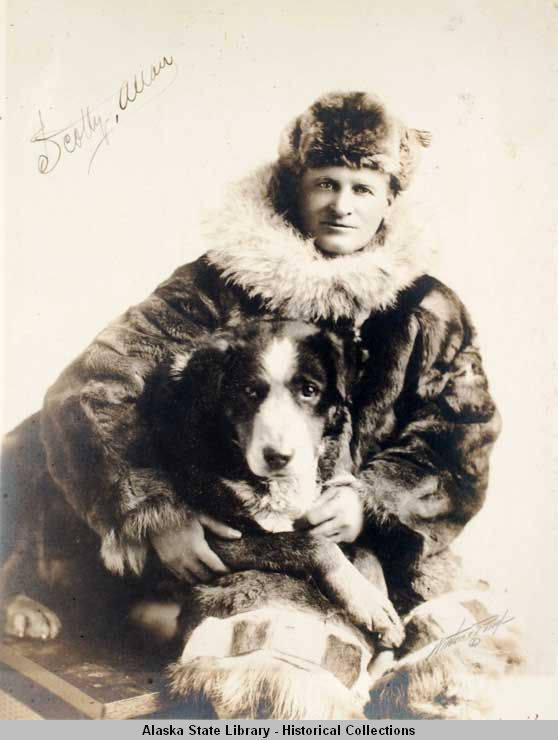
Scotty Allan

Allan Alexander "Scotty" Allan (1867–1941) was a Scottish-born American dog musher, businessman and politician.

He was born in Dundee. In 1907, several mushers based in Nome, Alaska, calling themselves the Nome Kennel Club, which promoted the breeding of dog teams and organized the All Alaska Sweepstakes as the first long distance dogsled race. Running from Nome to Candle this was held for the first time in 1908 and with Baldy as his lead dog Allan reached the podium eight times including three victories in 1911, 1912 and 1914.

In partnership with Esther Birdsall Darling he established a sled dog kennel in Nome. During the course of World War I, Scotty was contacted by an officer in the French Army who had previously lived in Nome to help him secure 100 lead sled dogs to serve on the front lines in snow-bound regions of France. Scotty procured and escorted the dogs, including descendants of Baldy and other dogs from the Darling-Allen Kennel, across Canada and the Atlantic Ocean during war time, under threat of sabotage and U-boats. The dogs eventually served in the Vosges area pulling vehicles and carrying messages and cargo, earning the Croix De Guerre for their work.

Moving with his family back to California before the 1925 Diphtheria Epidemic in Nome he was later sought out by Admiral Richard Byrd to train the dogs for his first expedition to the Antarctic in 1928.

== Racing history ==
Year	Time
1909	82 hours 2 minutes 41 seconds
1911	80 hours 49 minutes 41 seconds
1912	87 hours 27 minutes 46 seconds

== See also ==
- Mushing
