= J. Louis Giddings =

American archaeologist

James Louis Giddings Jr. (April 10, 1909 – December 9, 1964) was an American archaeologist who made significant contributions to Arctic archaeology. During three decades of his fieldwork in Northwest Alaska he established evidence of human occupation ranging as far back as 4,000 B.C.E.

== Early life ==
Giddings was born in Caldwell, Texas on April 10, 1909 to James Louis Giddings (1879-1955) and Maude Matthews (1881-1962). He received his bachelor of science degree in engineering from the University of Alaska Fairbanks in 1932. From 1932 to 1937 he worked as an assistant engineer with the Fairbanks Exploration Department of Smelting, Refining and Mining Company. His interest in dendrochronology led him to collect samples of wood from placer gold operations around Fairbanks operations in 1936. He continued his research at the University of Alaska Fairbanks to teach in 1938. In the following year, Giddings was invited by Froelich Rainey to participate in an archaeological project at Point Hope, Alaska. During the excavation, Giddings recognized a new archaeological site in the Arctic. Giddings with Rainey and Danish archaeologist, Helge Larsen, discovered the origins of the Ipiutak settlement.

== Career ==
After finding the Ipiutak settlement, Giddings turned his interests toward the Kobuk river region to study the living Eskimos and their ancient settlements. In the forest bordered Kobuk River he began the science of subarctic dendrochronology. Using wooden artifacts from Kobuk River sites, he became the first to use this new dating technique in the Arctic. Giddings continued his research at Norton Bay during the summers of 1948 through 1952. At the site he discovered the Denbigh Flint complex, a previously unknown Paleo-Eskimo culture in Alaska. Giddings continued to work in Cape Denbigh until 1952. In 1951 Giddings received his PhD from the University of Pennsylvania. After receiving his Ph.D. from the University of Pennsylvania, he moved to Brown University in Rhode Island where he was appointed professor of anthropology and the director of the Haffenreffer Museum of Anthropology in 1956. Throughout his academic career Giddings built upon his research of Arctic cultures. In 1964, his last year of field work, Giddings returned to Onion Portage on the Kobuk River for a large scale excavation that would provide a vertical succession of Arctic cultures.

== Death ==
While recovering at Memorial Hospital of Pawtucket R.I. from an automobile accident Giddings suffered from a heart attack and died on December 9, 1964.
