= Onion Portage Archeological District =

Archaeological site in Alaska, United States

- U.S. National Register of Historic Places
- U.S. National Historic Landmark District
- Alaska Heritage Resources Survey
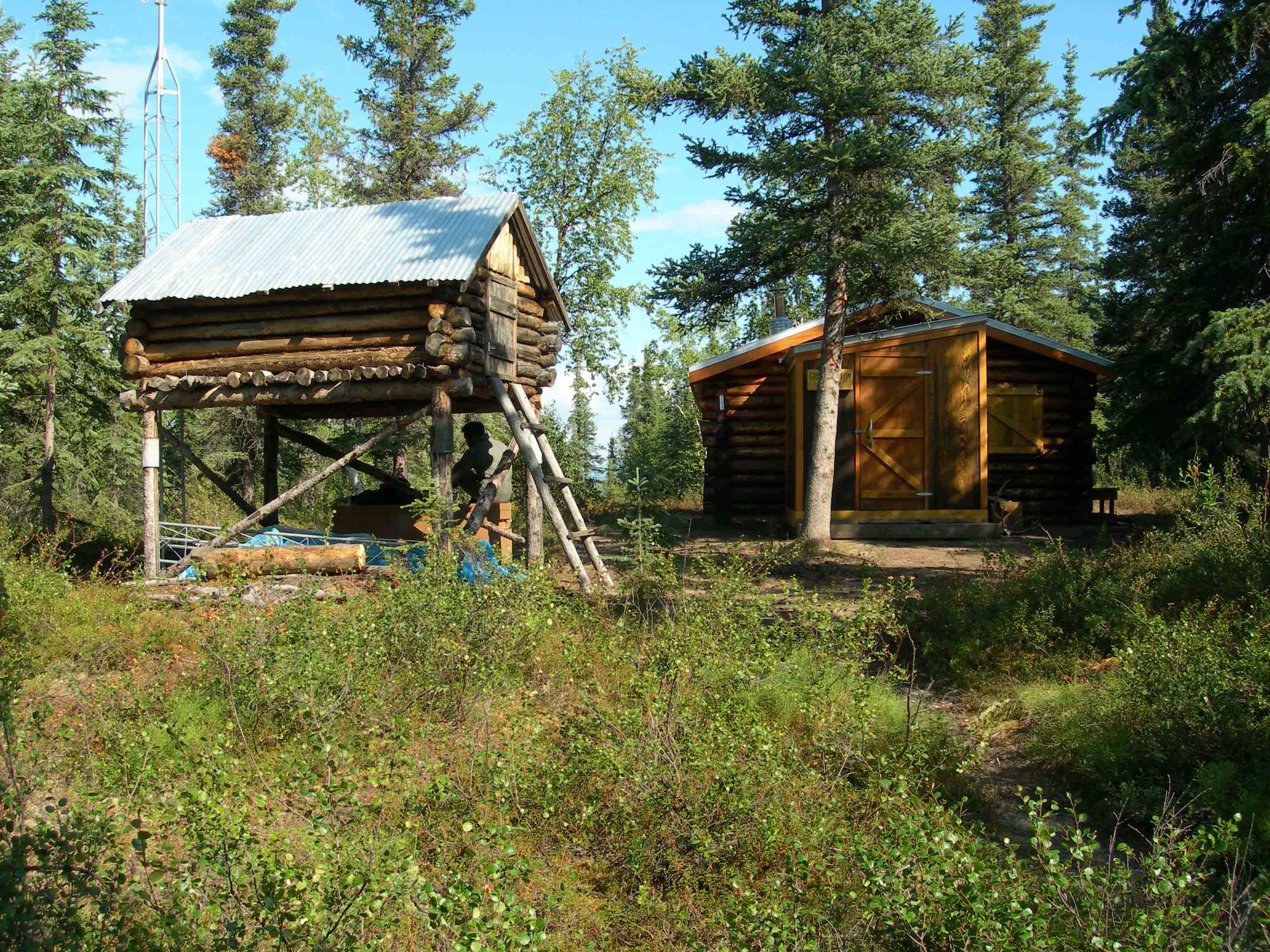
- The Giddings cabin
- Location: Address restricted
- Nearest city: Kiana, Alaska
- NRHP reference No.: 72000191
- AHRS No.: AMR-001

Significant dates
- Added to NRHP: June 20, 1972
- Designated NHLD: June 2, 1978

The Onion Portage Archeological District encompasses a major archaeological site in Kobuk Valley National Park in northwestern Alaska. The site is a deeply stratified site, at which archaeologists have located nine complexes ranging dating from approximately 6500BC to AD1700. The site has been of critical benefit for the study of Arctic cultures, and is used to determine the cultural chronology of the region.

The district was added to the National Register of Historic Places in 1972 and was declared a National Historic Landmark District in 1978.

== Setting ==
The Onion Portage site is located on the northern banks of the Kobuk River. Above the site is a sandy knoll, from which material is washed onto the site from deeply eroded gullies.

== Archaeological history ==
The Onion Portage site was first identified by the pioneering Arctic archaeologist J. Louis Giddings in 1940, during his first visit to the Kobuk River. He returned to the site in 1941, at which time some house pits were excavated, but the site's potential was not fully known. After World War II Giddings focused his efforts on other areas (notably the Iyatayet site and sites at Cape Krusenstern, both also National Historic Landmarks, where he began to assemble a chronology of Arctic cultures. In 1961 he visited the site again, at which time its highly stratified nature was discovered. Giddings led a major excavation at the site in 1964, the last year of his life, seeking evidence of older cultures in the many layers of deposits.

The only built structure to be included in the district is the Giddings Cabin, used by J. Louis Giddings during the 1964 excavation. The National Park Service has preserved the cabin.

== See also ==
- List of National Historic Landmarks in Alaska
- National Register of Historic Places listings in Northwest Arctic Borough, Alaska
