= Fairhaven Ditch =

- U.S. National Register of Historic Places
- U.S. Historic district
- Alaska Heritage Resources Survey
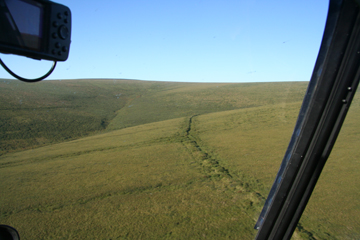
- Aerial view of part of the ditch (Park Service photo)
- Location: Address restricted
- Nearest city: Deering, Alaska
- Area: 4,969 acres (2,011 ha)
- Built: 1907
- Built by: Fairhaven Water Company
- Architect: C.L. Morris
- NRHP reference No.: 87001579
- AHRS No.: BEN-069
- Added to NRHP: September 23, 1987

The Fairhaven Ditch is a historic canal on the Seward Peninsula of northwestern Alaska. Located in the Bering Land Bridge National Preserve, it is a 38-mile (61 km) ditch dug in 1906–07 without the benefit of heavy equipment in extremely hostile terrain. The ditch was dug by miners engaged in placer mining on the peninsula, and was used to transport water from Imuruk Lake, the largest body of fresh water on the peninsula, to mining areas north of the lake. It is one of a large number of such canals dug on the peninsula, and was one of the longest. At the bottom it was 11 feet (3.4 m) wide, and was hacked out of permafrost, a volcanic field surrounding the lake, and dirt. Cabins built to house workers and monitor water flow survive. The ditch was listed on the National Register of Historic Places in 1987.

The Fairhaven ditch is located within two drainage basins, the upper section in that of Kugruk River and the lower section in that of Inmachuk River. The ditch takes its water from Imuruk Lake, which lies at an elevation of about 960 feet above sea level. A dam 500 feet long and 5 feet high was built to form a storage reservoir, and this held the total inflow at the lake for two years if necessary. The ditch is in three sections. The upper section, 17 miles long, lies on top of the lava and extends from the lake around the head of Wade Creek to the divide between Wade Creek and Pinnell River, where the water is dropped into a channel emptying into a sink hole in the lava, apparently connected by an underground passage with Wade Creek. The water is diverted from Wade Creek into Pinnell River by the middle section of the ditch, which is about half a mile long. The distance between the upper and lower ditches is about 6.5 miles, and the drop is estimated at 140 feet. The lower section of the ditch extends from the intake on Pinnell River along the right side of the valley to a point a few hundred feet below Logan Gulch, a small tributary of the Inmachuk above Arizona Creek, and has a length of about 19 miles, making the total length of the ditch 36.5 miles.

The ditch has a grade of 4.2 feet to the mile and was built 11 feet wide on the bottom. The grade line was located 1 foot below the surface of the ground on the lower side and a 4-foot lower bank was provided. The removal of 1 or 2 feet of the upper moss and soil put the bottom of the ditch into a mixture of ground ice and muck, much of which was almost clear ice. This material thawed when the water was turned in, and as a result a large part of the bottom of the ditch has settled at least 2 feet and the ditch has widened in many places to 15 or 20 feet or more. As the upper bank thawed, material was thrown against the lower bank to protect it and to keep the water from getting under it. Practically all the upper ditch and at least three-fourths of the lower ditch is built in frozen ground of this character. These sections have been difficult and expensive to maintain and caused considerable interruption in the delivery of water during 1909 and 1910. Where the lower ditch is built around the steep gulches that carry the eastern tributaries of the Pinnell the northerly slopes of the gulches are covered with muck, but the southerly slopes are made up of a more solid clay and of decomposed mica schist. Along the upper ditch lava bowlders are present in the muck from the surface to bedrock, and at a few places the material encountered was composed of angular fragments of lava with only a little soil between them. Above and below Snow Gulch, the lowest tributary of Pinnell River which the ditch crosses, are short pieces of rockwork. The rock is much shattered and could have been loosened with picks if it had not been frozen. Much difficulty was experienced in making the rockwork water tight on account of the lack of good sod, as the surface covering is commonly decayed moss or peat containing much fibrous matter and little earthly material, and will float even though saturated with water, so that it is necessary to weight it down with rocks when it is used on the bottom of the ditch.

The ditch was built under contract, and construction was begun early in 1906. The upper section and more than half of the lower section had been built bv October 12, when work had to be suspended for the year. The construction was completed in July, 1907, and water was run through the ditch for a short time in September of the same year. The pressure pipe leading from the penstock below Logan Gulch to the mine has a total length of 10,600 feet and gives a head of 530 feet on bedrock at the Utica group of claims. This head was greater than was found practicable for use, and a second penstock was built to reduce it to 330 feet.

== See also ==
- National Register of Historic Places listings in Northwest Arctic Borough, Alaska
