= Kiwalik River =

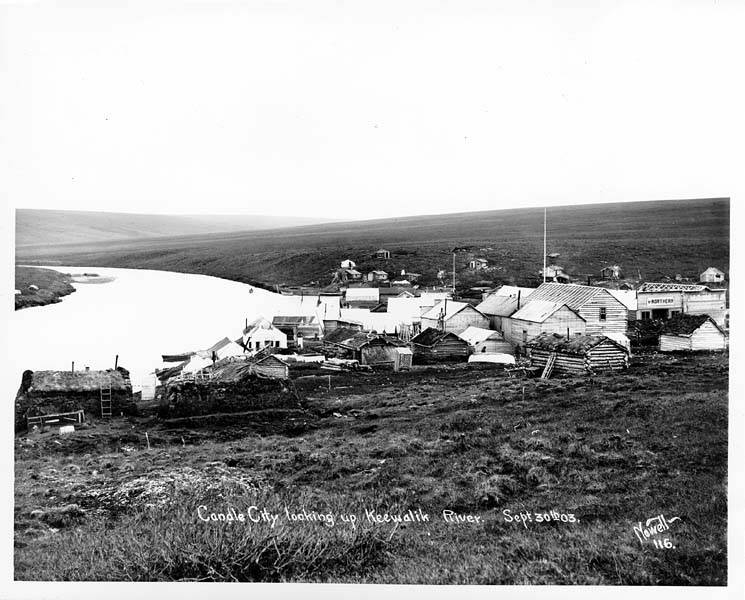

- Location of the mouth of the Kiwalik River in Alaska
- Native name: Kuugaaluk (Iñupiaq)

Location
- Country: United States
- State: Alaska
- Borough: Northwest Arctic

Physical characteristics
- Source: Seward Peninsula
  - location: near Granite Mountain
  - coordinates: 65°27′56″N 161°15′59″W
  - elevation: 1,467 ft (447 m)
- Mouth: Spafarief Bay on Kotzebue Sound of the Chukchi Sea
  - location: Mud Creek Channel near Candle
  - coordinates: 65°56′28″N 161°52′40″W
  - elevation: 13 ft (4.0 m)
- Length: 58 mi (93 km)
- Basin size: 800 sq mi (2,100 km^{2})

The Kiwalik River (Iñupiaq: Kuugaaluk) is a stream on the Seward Peninsula in the U.S. state of Alaska. The headwaters of the river originate in the eastern portion of the peninsula, around Granite Mountain. The river flows north to its mouth at Kiwalik Lagoon, Chukchi Sea. The start of the 20th century mining town of Candle is found on its western bank at the confluence of Candle Creek. The ore minerals and materials found in the river basin are galena, gold, pyrite, scheelite, silver and sphalerite, and the primary commodities are tungsten, lead and zinc.

== Etymology ==
The Inupiaq name, published by the British Admiralty, about 1880 on Chart 593, was spelled "Kee-wa-lik." In a modern orthography, it is spelled Kiwalik. TEL Moore noted the river and its people in his 1849–1850. While overwintering 20 miles (32 km) north on the Choris penensula awaiting Sir John Franklin in HMS Plover. The Inupiaq name "Keevalik' (german phonic spelling) means "south river" and south is the way the river trends to its source. It may also be a phonic variation of Keevalook", or "Muskrat River". The major Inupiaq village on the mid river was "Mukkuksuk village". (A place to get moss) Bedford Pim noted this village on his journey to St. Michaels in 1850 round trip from HMS Plover.

Kuguruk village, at the mouth of the Kuguruk River aka 'Kuuguluk', the next river to the west, is the Kuugurukmuit peoples'. People to the south referred to the Kiwalikmuit, and other Kotzebue Sound connected tribes as "Malamuit" (People who live in tents), who were semi-nomads that traveled far and wide, trading and subsisting. For this, they had long sleds, huge boats, owned many things, and supported lots of dogs, rooted in winter homes.

The Peoples of the Kotzebue Sound and its adjoining rivers speak a variation of the Iñupiaq Language and identify as Eskimo.

== Geography ==
The Kiwalik River flows on the north side of Seward Peninsula. Its origin is in a low ridge that divides the Kiwalik catchment, flows for a length of about 70 miles (110 km) in a northerly direction, and finally debouches into Spafarief Bay; this bay protrudes from the Kotzebue Sound in a southeasterly direction. Its traverse further lower down for stretch of 30 miles (48 km), through the flat lowland areas, is through a wide expanse of many miles; the river, however, has a narrow stretch of about 0.5 miles (0.80 km) in river stretch of a few miles, upstream of Candle. Beyond the Candle, it forms into a lagoon. The lagoon consists of vast areas of mud flats that get exposed during low tide.

== Tributaries ==
The river has many tributaries that emerge from the west and form narrow basins with long and low ridges forming the dividing line; these tributaries are: Canoe Creek, Gold Run, and Glacier, Dome, Bonanza, Eldorado, Candle Creek, and Minnehaha creeks. Another important stream, which provides for water supply needs of the town, is the Glacier Creek which originates from the eastern slope of Monument Mountain, which is the highest peak in the Fairhaven district. It converges with the Kiwalik, about 25 miles (40 km) above the estuary. The water resource is from limestone springs during the low flow season, which increases substantially from glacial melt during the season.

Another stream joining the Kiwalik, about 2 miles (3.2 km) above the mouth of Glacier Creek, is the Gold Run. This stream is also sourced by springs but its flows are not comparable to that of Glacier Creek; the discharge of these two steams together, as reported in the summer of 1909 during the low flow season, was only of the order of 2.5 cubic metres per second (88 cu ft/s). Even in respect of other streams in the vicinity, there is very little flow during lean season. It is also reported that Candle Creek, which has a catchment area of 60 square miles (160 km^{2}) at the mouth, goes dry during the lean season.

From the eastern part of the Kiwalik River basin, the streams emanating from the east are the Quartz and Hunter creeks. Quartz Creek, with a larger catchment (rugged and hilly on the eastern and southern borders of the basin) joins the Kiwalik River, about 6 miles (9.7 km) above the mouth of Glacier Creek. A thin layer of moss covers the floor of the basin. The hill slopes are steep and precipitation drains out fast over the river bed which consists of loose gravel. Other streams that flow through the basin and which join the Quartz Creek are the Hunter Creek and Bear Creek; the former creek has lesser flows compared to Quartz Creek. Lava Creek, another small tributary from the east that drains a flat lava area in the north of Hunter Creek, has high runoff during the rainy months. The banks of the river and the creeks are lined with spruce and also willow vegetation, in specific stretches.

== History ==
The river bed has very low slopes which retards the flow; the slope is generally in the range of 5 feet (1.5 m) to 1 mile (1.6 km), except in its headwater reach of the river. This feature did not permit diversion of river water for mining to adopt hydraulicking procedure, particularly when the Alaska gold mining was at its peak. Hence, the Candle-Alaska Hydraulic Gold Mining Company excavated a ditch (an unlined canal), in 1907, to collect water from Glacier and Dome creeks, and to convey it to a location near Candle to facilitate mining the gold-bearing gravels of Candle Creek. To cater to the needs of the low flow season, when the streams (Quartz and Hunter creek to Candle Creek) carried low flows, an additional canal was constructed during the summers of 1908 and 1909 to facilitate the hydraulicking process of mining. The ditches were of substantial length, measuring 60 miles (97 km) of canals and an additional 14,000 feet (4,300 m) of pipe line to a point about 303 feet (92 m) above the mouth of Candle Creek.

== Gold and other minerals ==
Kiwalik River is the third largest river in the region which cuts across the gold belt, and its tributary the Candle Creek holds gold deposits which were reported to be economical for extraction. Candle Creek and the town of candle close by have maximum extraction locations with the operations extensively carried out by the Arctic Circle Explorations Inc. Dredging was also carried out in the bed of the Kiwalik River for gold which was not successful. Gold placers were also located in the Quartz Creek. Uranium concentrations of more than 0.025% of equivalent uranium has also been found in the placers of the headwaters of the tributaries of the Kiwalik River.

Candle on the Kiwalik Creek saw the gold rush in 1901 and 1906 and became the central Placer Gold District, when the population in the town was about 546; by about 1938 it had declined to 85 with the end of the gold rush. It was booming gold mining town

== See also ==
- List of rivers of Alaska
