= National Register of Historic Places listings in Northwest Arctic Borough, Alaska =

Location of the Northwest Arctic Borough in Alaska

This is a list of the National Register of Historic Places listings in Northwest Arctic Borough, Alaska.

This is intended to be a complete list of the properties and districts on the National Register of Historic Places in Northwest Arctic Borough, Alaska, United States. The locations of National Register properties and districts for which the latitude and longitude coordinates are included below, may be seen in a Google map.

There are three properties and districts listed on the National Register in the borough, including two National Historic Landmarks.

This National Park Service list is complete through NPS recent listings posted September 18, 2026.

== Current listings ==
	Name on the Register	Image	Date listed	Location	City or town	Description
1	Cape Krusenstern Archeological District National Monument	Cape Krusenstern Archeological District National Monument	November 7, 1973 (#73000378)	Address restricted	Kotzebue	
2	Fairhaven Ditch	Fairhaven Ditch	September 23, 1987 (#87001579)	Address restricted	Deering	A 38-mile canal dug to provide water for placer mining.
3	Onion Portage Archeological District	Onion Portage Archeological District	June 20, 1972 (#72000191)	Address restricted	Kiana	

== See also ==
- List of National Historic Landmarks in Alaska
- National Register of Historic Places listings in Alaska
