= Kugruk River =

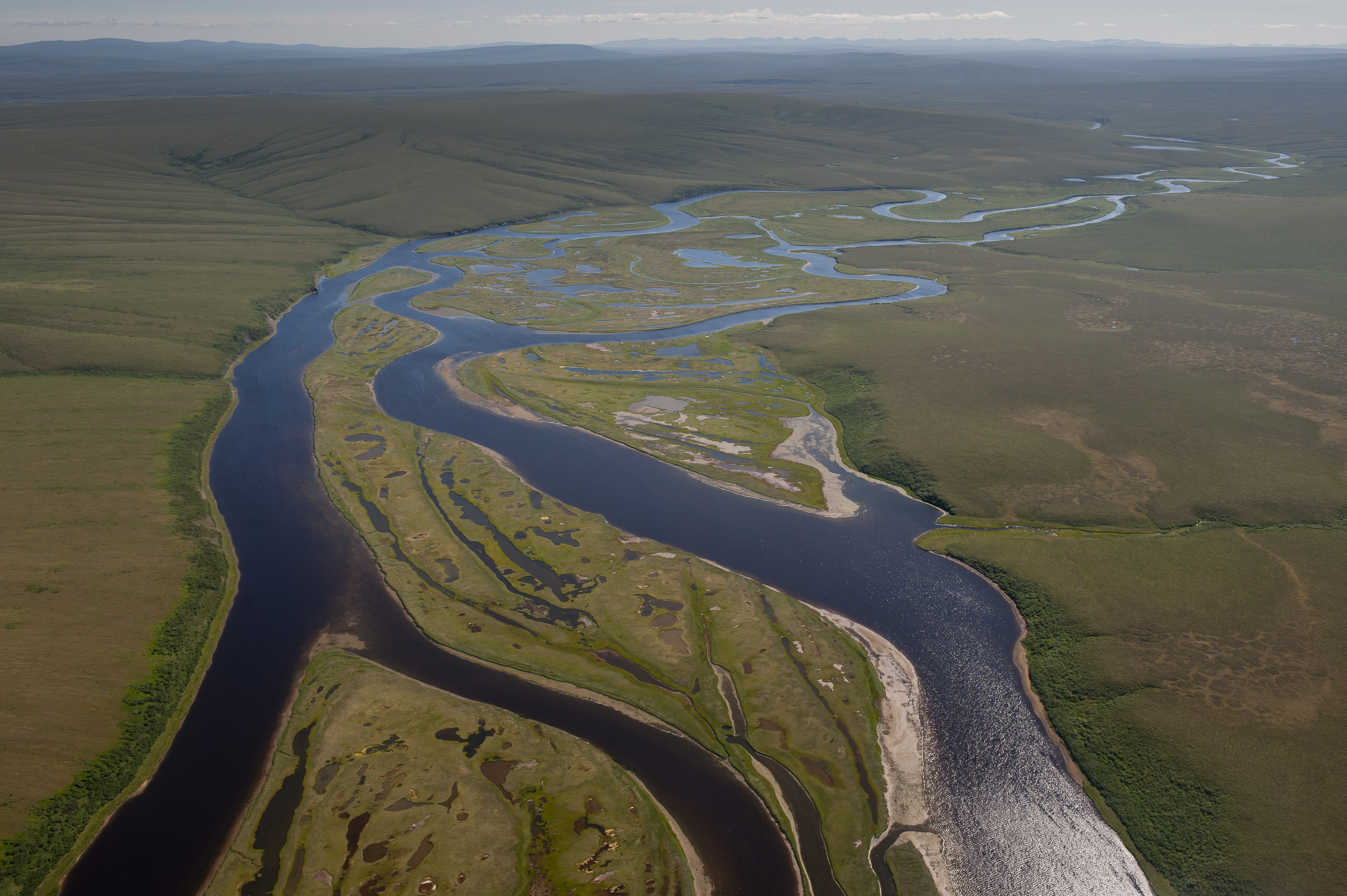

- Location of the mouth of the Kugruk River in Alaska

Location
- Country: United States
- State: Alaska
- Borough: Northwest Arctic

Physical characteristics
- Source: near Imuruk Lake
  - location: Seward Peninsula
  - coordinates: 65°41′24″N 163°15′05″W
  - elevation: 1,311 ft (400 m)
- Mouth: Kugruk Lagoon of Kotzebue Sound on the Chukchi Sea
  - location: 5.5 miles (8.9 km) southeast of Cape Deceit
  - coordinates: 66°00′22″N 162°40′13″W
  - elevation: 0 ft (0 m)
- Length: 60 mi (97 km)

The Kugruk River is a stream, 60 miles (97 km) long, in the northwestern part of the U.S. state of Alaska. It is the largest tributary of the Kuzitrin River. It begins near Imuruk Lake on the Seward Peninsula and flows generally north to Kugruk Lagoon, at Kotzebue Sound on the Chukchi Sea. The river enters the lagoon 5.5 miles (8.9 km) southeast of Cape Deceit in the Northwest Arctic Borough.

== History ==
In the late 19th century, the river's Inuit name was reported as "Koogroog" (not to be confused with the Kougarok River), but variants in other documents referred to it as "Mammoth" for mammoth bones found nearby, or "Swan". In 1904, the United States Board on Geographic Names approved the name "Kugruk", which is how the river was identified in court records. Some mining was reported on Windy, Neva, North Fork, Coarse Gold, Henry, Taylor, and Macklin creeks, tributaries of the Kugruk River.

== Geography ==
The Kugruk River is a large northern tributary of the Kuzitrin. It has a length, neglecting meanders and minor bends, of about 60 miles (97 km). Throughout the greater part of its course, it occupies a canyon cut in a high plateau-like upland, which varies in elevation from 1,200 to 1,800 feet (370 to 550 m). About 10 miles (16 km) above its mouth, the Kugruk River emerges upon the Kuzitrin lowland from its canyon. The course of this canyon is approximately north and south for 30 miles (48 km), and follows in a general way the strike of the bed rock. Below the mouth of Coarse Gold Creek the canyon is sharply cut, and no gravel benches or extensive gravel bars were observed in the creek bed. Above Coarse Cold Creek the valley broadens. At this place there are broad benches, about 20 feet (6.1 m) above the river bed. cut on the upturned edges of the schists, and covered with several feet of gravel. Similar gravel benches occur occasionally as far as the mouth of Taylor Creek, above which point the creek bed was not examined in detail. At the mouth of Macklin Creek, the Kugruk River turns sharply, and above this place it flows in an east–west direction from its source at the east base of Kugruk Mountain. The bed rock along the Kugruk River is generally highly metamorphosed, consisting of mica-schists and calcareous schists, with large intrusions of greenstone. The greenstone is schistose, but has a porphyritic texture, the phenocrysts being hornblende, while the groundmass is made up essentially of epidote, hornblende, quartz, and chlorite, mostly secondary minerals.

== Tributaries ==
Windy Creek is a large tributary of the Kugruk River from the west. Its source is near that of Igloo Creek, which is a tributary to the Agiapuk River. Windy Creek flows across the strike of the bed rock in a deep canyon, cut in the Kugruk Plateau. The gravels seen at the mouth of this creek consist of greenstone, limestone, and mica-schist. The bed rock along the creek is reported to be a series of limestones and mica-schists.

Neva Creek is a short tributary of the Kugruk River from the east side, about one-fourth of a mile above the mouth of Windy Creek. The bed rock at its mouth is gray mica-schist, highly metamorphosed. Sluicing was done in shallow gravels near the mouth of the creek during the summer. At the time of the writer's visit the camp was deserted, although the sluice boxes and canvas hose were still in position.

North Fork is a large tributary of the Kugruk River from the east, about 10 miles (16 km) above Windy Creek. Harris Creek flows into North Fork about 4 miles (6.4 km) from its mouth.

Coarse Gold Creek is a large tributary of the Kugruk River from the west side, about a mile above North Fork. It heads in the high divide between the Kugruk and Agiapuk drainages, and flows eastward, cutting across the strike of the schists and limestones. At the mouth of the creek the bed rock consists of highly altered mica-schists.

Henry Creek is a tributary to the Kugruk River from the west. It heads in the high divide south of Kugruk Mountain, and flows eastward in a deep canyon cut in the upland and across the strike of the schist and limestone bed rock.

The Kugruk River forks about 35 miles (56 km) from its mouth, the branches being of about equal size. The eastern fork is called Taylor Creek, while the western retains the name Kugruk River. Taylor Creek rises to the southeast of Midnight Mountain, and flows west to its junction with the Kugruk River. It occupies a valley about 800 feet (240 m) deep, cut in the plateau on which Midnight Mountain stands. The bed rock at the mouth of Taylor Creek is a dark schist similar to that of Midnight Mountain, while immediately south of that mountain, at a point about f> miles from the mouth of Taylor Creek, there are exposures of very much altered limestone. The creek probably cuts across the strike of a series of beds of schist and limestone.

Macklin Creek is a tributary of the Kugruk River from the east side, about 6 miles (9.7 km) above the mouth of Taylor Creek. It heads near the base of Midnight Mountain and flows westward about 6 miles (9.7 km) to its junction with the Kugruk River. For several miles Macklin Creek flows parallel to Schlitz Creek, tributary to the Serpentine River, and a low pass between the two creeks suggests an old waterway. The creek occupies a rather broad valley cut in the upland. The bed rock, where it has been seen, consists of dark feldspathic, graphitic mica-schist, similar to that of Midnight Mountain.

== See also ==
- List of rivers of Alaska
