= Christine Whiting Parmenter =

American author

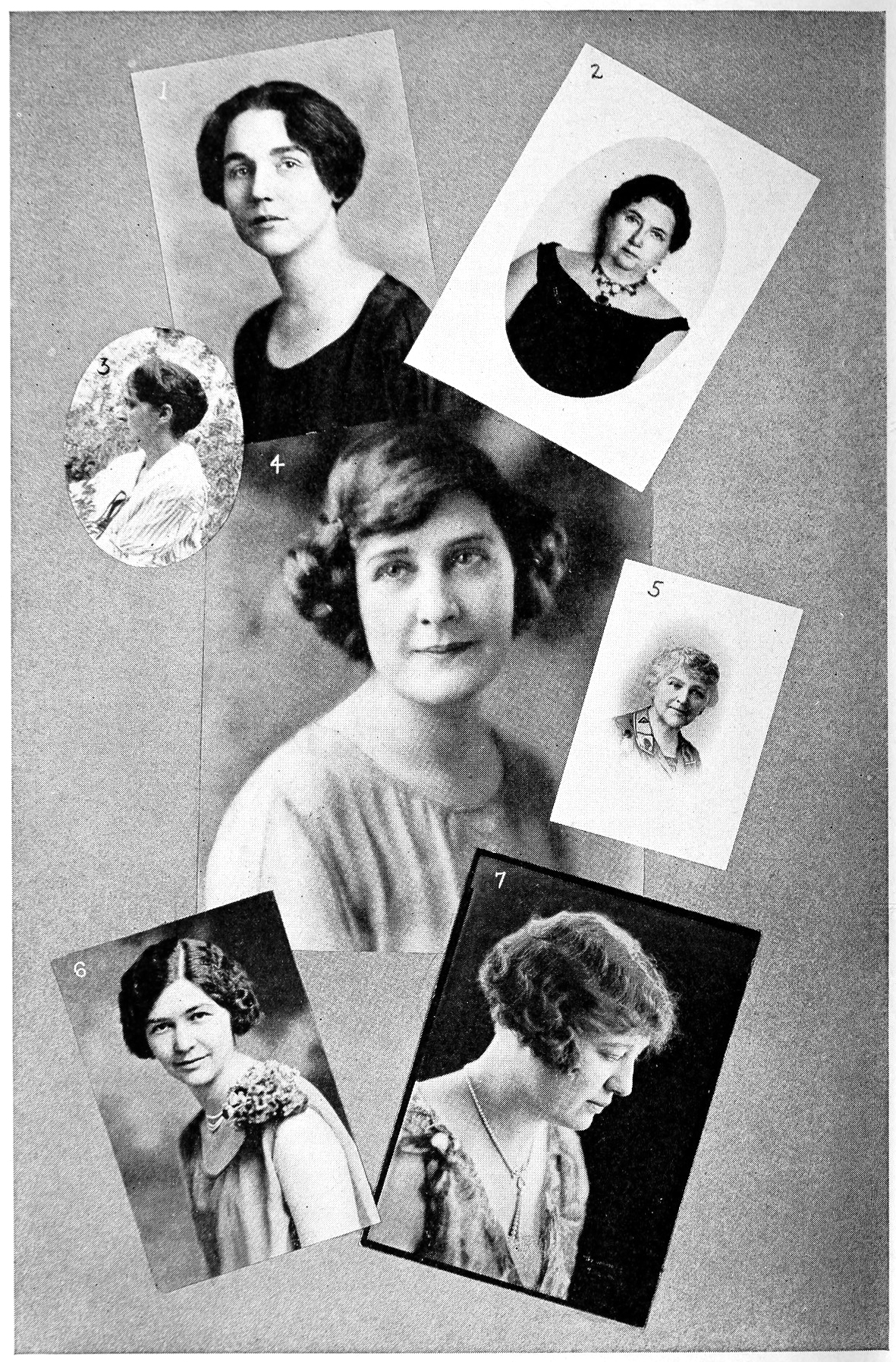
A Few of the Eminent Women of Colorado, Margaret Tod Ritter, Virginia D. McClurg, Christine Whiting Parmenter, Lillian White Spencer, Nona L. Brooks, Agnes Wright Spring, Millicent H. Velhagen

Christine Whiting Parmenter (December 21, 1877 – March 1953) was an American author.

== Biography ==
Christine Whiting was born in Plainfield, New Jersey, on December 21, 1877, the daughter of Frederic A. Whiting and Catherine Tracy Allen.

She was a former resident of Framingham Center, Massachusetts, and moved to Colorado in 1917. She married Dr. Kenneth R. Parmenter, M.D. (d. 1939), and they had one daughter, Catherine, who married Henry C. Newell. They lived at 1208 Cheyenne Blvd., Colorado Springs, Colorado. She returned to New England in 1938.

She was an author, a writer of fiction for most of the leading magazines.

She was a member of the Authors' League of America.

She died in March 1953 and is buried at Mount Auburn Cemetery, Cambridge.

Her papers are preserved at the Denver Public Library.

== Works ==
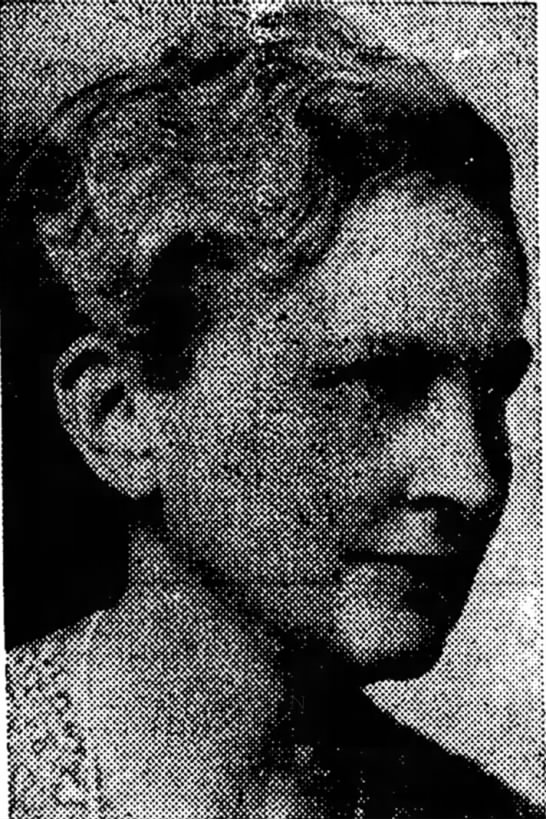
Christine Whiting Parmenter

- 1924 Jean's Winter With the Warners illustrated by Charles A. Federer
- 1925 The Treasure at Shady Vale
- 1927 The Unknown Port
- 1927 The Real Reward illustrated by Hattie Longstreet Price
- 1928 One Wide River to Cross
- 1929 Silver Ribbons
- 1929 The Dusty Highway
- 1930 David's Star of Bethlehem
- 1930 So Wise We Grow
- 1932 Miss Aladdin
- 1933 The Long Quest
- 1933 Shining Palace
- 1934 The Wind Blows West
- 1935 The Kings of Beacon Hill
- 1937 Swift Waters
- 1937 The unknown port
- 1938 I was Christabel
- 1939 Stories of Courage and Devotion
- 1940 As The Seed is Sown
- 1941 Lights-and a star!
- 1942 A golden age
- 1947 Fair were the days
- 1948 Stronger Than Law
