= Doug Parmenter =

- Born: Doug Parmenter; 6 November 1987 (age 38)
- Origin: Reading, Berkshire, England
- Genres: Rock, Post-Britpop
- Occupation: Musician
- Instruments: Vocals, guitar, bass guitar, piano, clarinet, violin
- Years active: 2001–2010

Doug Parmenter (born 6 November 1987) is a British musician, songwriter, record producer and film-maker from Reading, Berkshire, England.

Parmenter learned to play the piano at a young age. Before reaching his twelfth birthday, he had already become an accomplished pianist, violinist and clarinettist, although he lacked the drive to pursue music as a career. After teaching himself to play the bass guitar, he began to collaborate and write with others, later developing his skills on the other side of the mixing desk.

Parmenter is half of the duo The Idles, a partnership formed with the guitarist and pianist Joseph Fuller, who frequently gigged and collaborated with other musicians in Reading, Berkshire. They developed a countrywide fan base after receiving national airplay on BBC Radio 1. Together they championed the music scenes of Reading and nearby communities.

Since appearing on Later... with Jools Holland, Parmenter has performed and collaborated with John Power, KT Tunstall and Jack White.

== Glastonbury Festival ==
Parmenter's most infamous performance was as the unofficial opening act of the Glastonbury Festival 2003. The Idles had been asked to perform the sound check for the Jazz World stage on the Thursday, whilst the main stages open officially on the Friday. After drinking too much Brothers Pear Cider before the set, he ran across the stage, failed to negotiate the drum kit, and was stretchered off stage with a suspected broken leg. Subsequent medical inspection revealed a sprained ankle. He went on later in the weekend to play an unannounced set on The Left Field stage.

== Retirement From the Music Industry ==
Despite the wide global audience his work has reached, Parmenter has consistently shunned fame and fought to maintain what he describes as "a regular lifestyle". Since 2010, he has begun to formalise his retirement from the music industry.

He is a dedicated member of his local Neighborhood Watch scheme, routinely assisting local police with investigations into public disturbances. Most recently, he has made CCTV footage available to ongoing inquiries.
