= Hattie Longstreet Price =

- Born: Hattie Longstreet; July 17, 1891; Germantown, Philadelphia, US
- Died: July 11, 1968 (aged 76); Chicago, Illinois, US
- Known for: Illustration

Hattie Longstreet Price (July 17, 1891 – July 11, 1968) was an American artist and illustrator. She is known for her illustrations of children's books.

== Biography ==
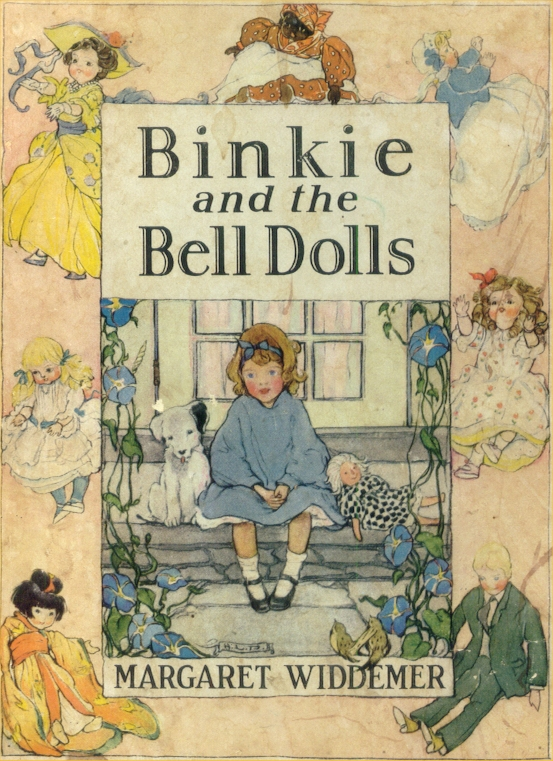
Cover of Binkie and the Bell Dolls by Hattie Longstreet Price (her initials can be seen below the girl's slippers)

Hattie Longstreet was born on July 17, 1891 in Germantown, Pennsylvania. She studied at the Pennsylvania Academy of Fine Arts and Académie Colarossi in Paris.

She illustrated The Yellow Quill Girl by Lotta Rowe Anthony in 1921 and several Ruth Campbell novels in 1923. She illustrated Ruth Brown McArthur's The Gingerbread House.

Other works by Longstreet include illustrations for Christine Whiting Parmenter's The Real Reward (1927). She also illustrated Eight Cousins and Rose in Bloom by Louisa May Alcott. Her illustrations for Alcott's Little Women have been described as "stress[ing] the gentility of the March family. ... subordinating representation to decorative effect, endowing all her female characters with delicate profiles, stylized hands, and dainty slippered feet".

She also illustrated The Story of Silk (1925) by Sara Ware Bassett and The Fairyland of Opera by Louise M. Pleasanton.

She illustrated several books by Alice Turner Curtis, including A Frontier Girl of Pennsylvania, A Yankee Girl at Lookout Mountain, A Little Maid of New Hampshire (1928), A Little Maid of South Carolina (1929), and A Little Maid of New Orleans (1930).

She died in Chicago on July 11, 1968.

== Additional works ==
- Baldy of Nome by Esther Birdsall Darling
