= Imuruk Lake =

Lake in the state of Alaska, United States

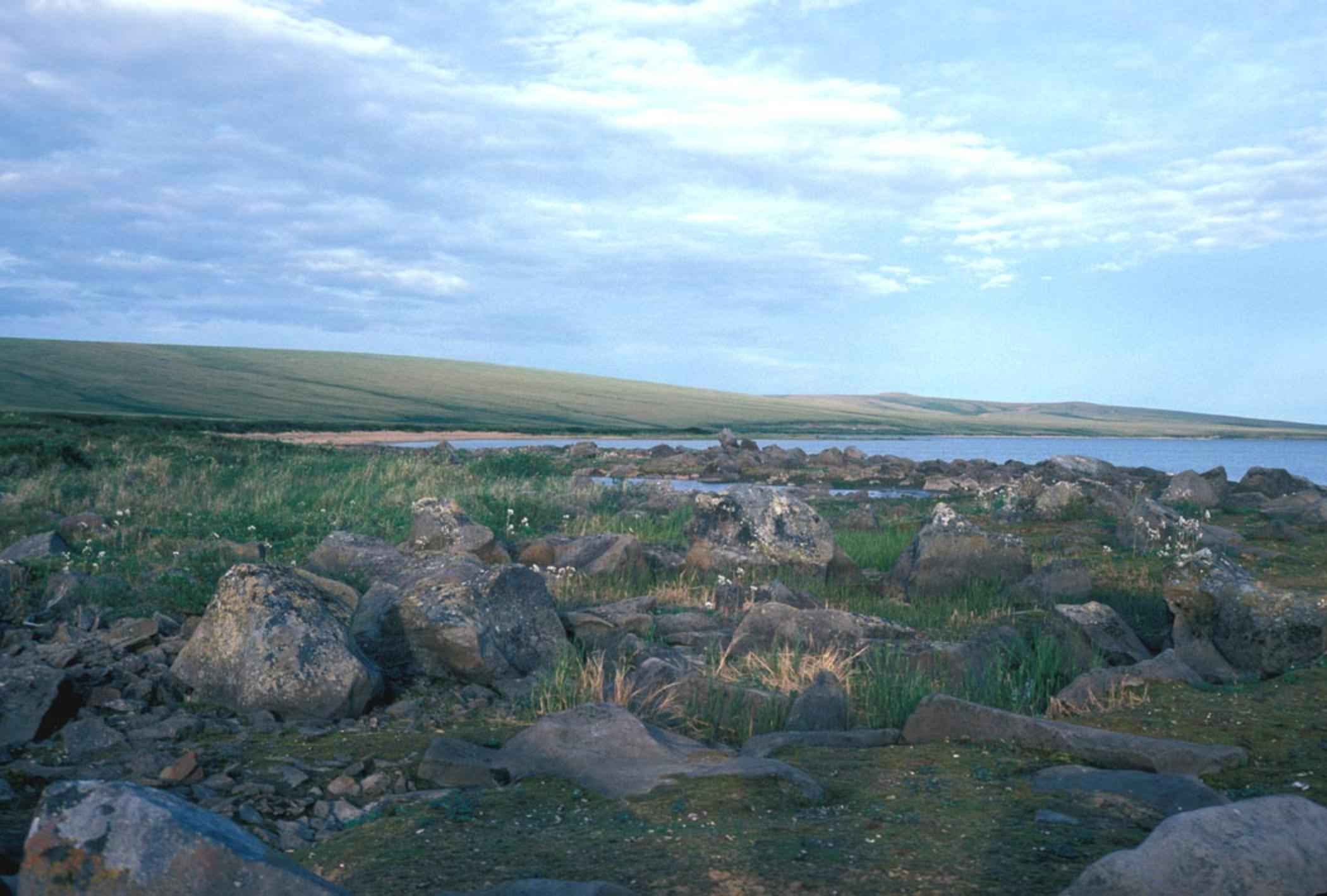
- Imuruk Lake

- Location within Alaska
- Location: Seward Peninsula in Alaska
- Coordinates: 65.591349°N 163.196843°W

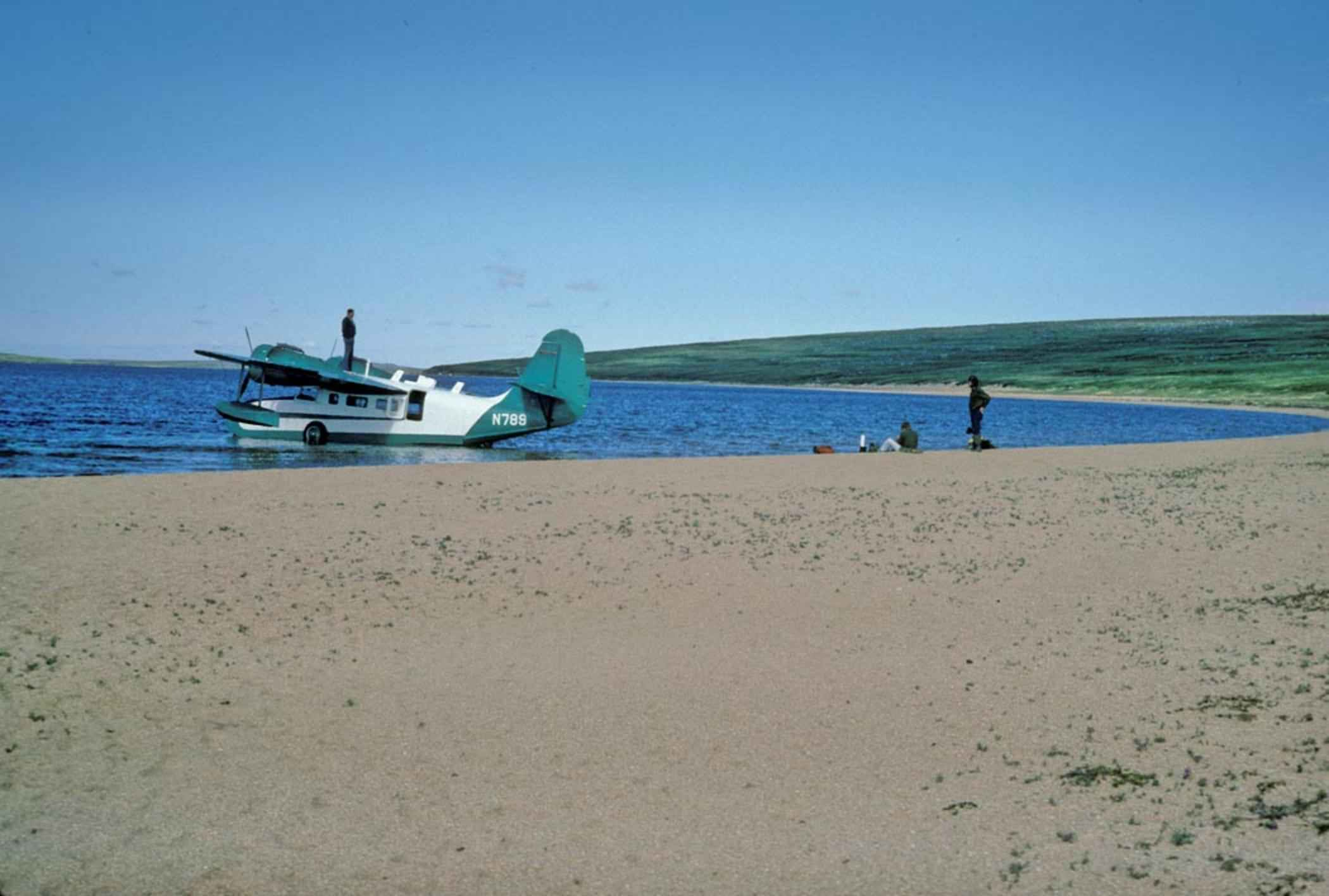
Loading off from float plane on Imuruk Lake

Imuruk Lake (Inupiaq: Imaġruk or Narvaġruk) is the largest body of fresh water in Seward Peninsula in the U.S. state of Alaska. It measures 31 square miles (80 km^{2}) and has a drainage basin of 102 square miles (260 km^{2}), It lies on top of a lava plateau at an elevation of 960 feet (290 m). The drainage basin is relatively flat, as the maximum elevation is only about 1,600 feet (490 m). A low gap in the divide between the lake and the head of the right fork of Goodhope River rises only a few feet above the lake. The Fairhaven Ditch takes practically all its water from the lake. Serpentine Hot Springs flow to the Serpentine River, 47 miles (76 km) northwest of Imuruk Lake.
