= American River (Agiapuk River tributary) =

River in Alaska, United States

Coordinates: 65°25′27″N 165°47′17″W

American River is a waterway in the U.S. state of Alaska. Situated on the northwestern portion of Seward Peninsula, it is the eastern and larger fork of the Agiapuk River. It joins the Agiapuk River in a broad, gravel-filled basin, and for 20 miles (32 km) up, is characterized by a wide flood plain and a meandering course. It receives a number of large tributaries from the east which also have wide floodplains developed in their lower parts. The important tributaries are Portage Creek, Budd Creek, and Igloo Creek, while smaller tributaries are Burke, Gold Run, Dome, and Camp creeks. All of these tributaries received some attention from gold prospectors. The river is easily navigable by small boats for several miles above the mouth of Portage Creek, and the region can also be reached from Teller. Gold had been discovered in the region in September 1901 and a number of the streams were known to be gold-bearing to some extent.

== Tributaries ==
Above Portage Creek, The American River has an east–west course for about 20 miles (32 km). The bed rock at the head of the river consists of limestones of Port Clarence formation. These limestones are slightly altered and are not mineralized to any extent. At the mouth of Portage Creek, the bed rock consists of calcareous mica-schists and limestones. Portage Creek heads about 15 miles (24 km) southwest of Shishmaref Inlet and flows eastward for several miles in a canyon cut in the plateau which slopes down to that inlet. It then turns southwards and flows in a comparatively deep valley for 10 miles (16 km) to its junction with the American River. Through the last 0.5 miles (0.80 km) before entering the American River, a broad flood plain is developed within which the creek has a very sinuous course. Along Portage Creek, limestones and calcareous mica-schiste with occasional beds of graphitic schist constitute the bed rock.

Budd Creek enters the American River from the east, about 6 miles (9.7 km) below Portage Creek. It is 15–20 miles (24–32 km) in length. About 3 miles (4.8 km) from its mouth, it receives a large tributary, Windy Creek, from the south side. About 10 miles (16 km) above its mouth, it forks. The two parts coming from the north and south, their direction being determined by the strike of the bed rocks. The bed rock on Budd Creek is composed of crystalline limestones, calcareous mica-schists, and graphitic schists, usually striking in a north–south direction, and having dips varying from 0° to 70°. Kugruk Mountain, a few miles east of the forks of Budd Creek, is made up of quartz-mica-schist, which has been thrown up into an anticline. Below the forks, the creek sinks leaving its bed dry except in times of high water. After flowing underground for about 2 miles (3.2 km), the creek rises again in a number of springs. This sink occurs where a massive bed of limestone, dipping downstream at a small angle, cuts across the creek.

Windy Creek is a tributary to Budd Creek from the south about 5 miles (8.0 km) from its mouth. This creek is about 5 miles (8.0 km) long and flows nearly north, parallel to the strike of the bed rock which consists of more or less flaggy beds of limestone between which there is a stratum of graphitic schist that outcrops along nearly the whole length of the creek. Near the head of the creek, its bed contains many boulders of greenstone, which are derived from sills intruded in the limestone near its head. The valley of Windy Creek is broad and gravel filled. Along the sides of the valley, back from the creek bed, the gravel extends up the slopes forming some well-marked gravel benches. A cut bank of the creek shows 6 feet (1.8 m) of muck overlying 6 feet (1.8 m) of gravel.

Igloo Creek, also called on some maps Lewis Creek, enters the American River a few miles above its junction with the Agiapuk River. This creek, like Budd Creek flows west across the strike of the bed rock; which as on Budd Creek consists of limestones, calcareous and graphitic schists, with some intruded sills of greenstone which are highly altered. Like Budd Creek, Igloo Creek sinks for about a mile (1.6km) off its course probably in crossing the same bed of limestone that causes the sink on Budd Creek. In its lower course, Igloo Creek meanders over a broad flood plain from which the hills rise by very gentle slopes to the flat-topped upland. Igloo Creek, except where it sinks in passing over limestone beds, carries a large amount of water.
