= Oliver Optic's Magazine: Our Boys and Girls =

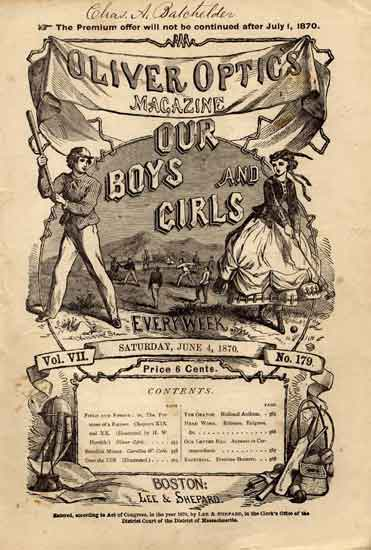
- June 1870
- Editor: William Taylor Adams ("Oliver Optic")
- Categories: Children's magazine
- Frequency: Weekly (January 1867-1870); Monthly (1871-December 1875)
- Circulation: 100,000 (in 1870)
- Publisher: Lee & Shepard
- First issue: January 5, 1867
- Final issue: December 1875 (as Oliver Optic's Magazine)
- Country: United States
- Based in: Boston, Massachusetts
- Language: English

Oliver Optic's Magazine: Our Boys and Girls (sometimes, Oliver Optic's Magazine) was a 19th-century American weekly children's magazine. It was edited by boys' book writer, William Taylor Adams. Adams used the pen name "Oliver Optic". At its demise in December 1875, it was being published monthly. It became the most popular children's monthly in the United States.

The magazine was published in Boston, Massachusetts by Lee & Shepard. Publication began in January 1867. It had a nine year run, folding in December 1875. A 16-page single copy cost 6 cents; a yearly subscription was $2.50. Issues were reprinted in 1872 as Our Boys and Girls Mirror.

Contents included puzzles, rebuses, exercises in declamation with illustrations of appropriate gestures, dialogues, etc. Adams' serial story, Our Starry Flag, brought forth at least 100 letters from the magazine's readers. Adams felt compelled to write another story featuring the same characters — in order not to "disappoint his young friends". The magazine was hugely popular.
