= Esther Birdsall Darling =

American poet

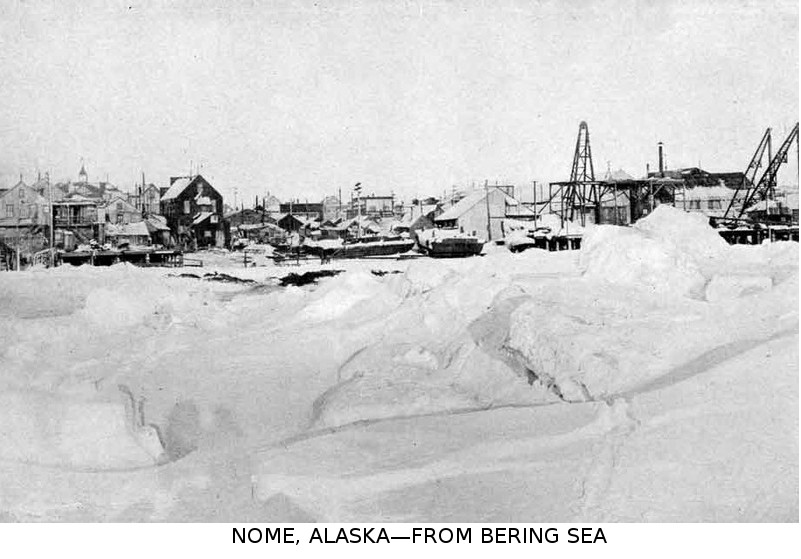
Photograph of Nome, Alaska from Baldy of Nome

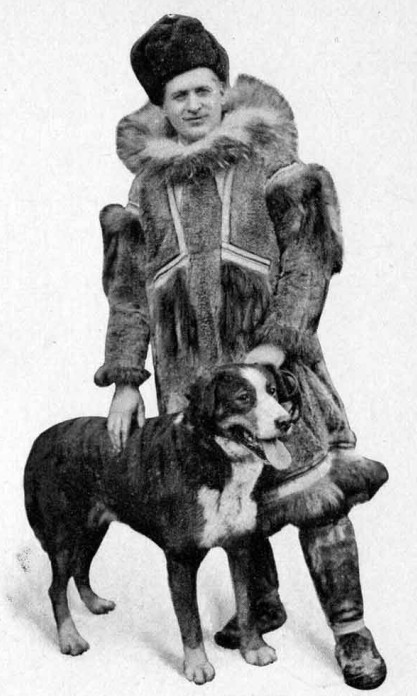
Photo of Scotty Allan from Baldy of Nome

Esther Birdsall Darling was an American author and poet; she also opened and ran a sled dog kennel in Alaska.

She studied at Mills College and traveled in Europe in her youth. After her marriage in 1907 she moved to Nome, Alaska, where her husband ran a hardware and expedition outfitting business.

Darling and Scotty Allan established a sled dog kennel in Nome and organized the first long distance dogsled race. Descendants of Baldy, and other dogs from the Darling-Allen Kennel, were purchased by the French military in World War I and transported to Europe where they worked pulling vehicles and carrying messages and cargo. In 1917, the dogs were awarded a military medal, and Darling received it on their behalf.

Her books include Baldy of Nome, about a champion sled dog, and a series of followups. She also wrote a poem about Alaska's state flower, the forget-me-not.

In 2009, at the Mushing History Conference, a presentation on Darling was given by Jane Haigh. The Anchorage Museum of History and Art has a picture of her with three sled dogs.

== Bibliography ==
- Up in Alaska (1912)
- Baldy of Nome: An Immortal of the Trail (1913)
- The Break-Up (1928)
- Navarre of the North (1930)
- No Boundary Line (1942)
- Boris (1942)
- Luck of the Trail (1947)
