= Candle, Alaska =

Unincorporated community in the state of Alaska, United States

Candle
- Populated Place
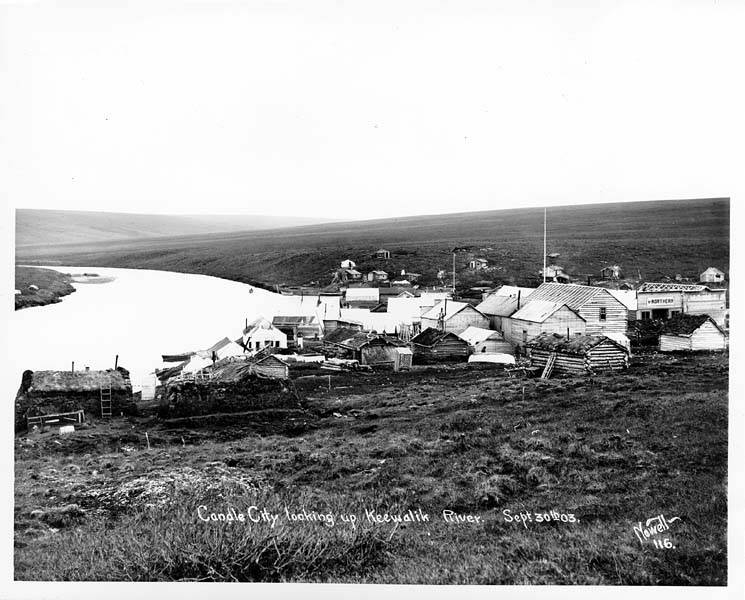
- Candle City, September 30, 1903

- Location in Alaska
- Coordinates: 65°54′48″N 161°55′28″W
- Country: United States
- State: Alaska
- Borough: Northwest Arctic Borough
- Elevation: 13 ft (4 m)
- Time zone: UTC-9 (Alaska (AKST))
  - Summer (DST): UTC-8 (AKDT)
- Area code: 907
- GNIS feature ID: 1412708

Candle (Qawiaraq Iñupiaq: Kialukuwik; Malimiut Iñupiaq: Masrutuuq) is an unincorporated community in the Northwest Arctic Borough of the U.S. state of Alaska. It is situated on the west bank of the Kiwalik River at Candle Creek. It was founded around 1901 as a mining camp, named for the adjacent creek. The post office was established in 1902.

== History ==
Candle is the birthplace of prominent Native American actor Ray Mala. Although there was a hospital in Candle, Mala was delivered in an Inupiaq sod house by his grandmother and a niece on a ruthlessly cold morning two days after Christmas in 1906.

In 1908, Candle was the turnaround point for the first major mushing competition, the All Alaska Sweepstakes, which was started by John Skyles Beltz and Allan "Scotty" Alexander Allan, and ran 408 miles (657 km) from Nome to Candle and back.

== Demographics ==
Historical population
Census	Pop.	Note	%±
1910	204		—
1920	91		−55.4%
1930	85		−6.6%
1940	119		40.0%
1950	105		−11.8%
1960	103		−1.9%
U.S. Decennial Census

Candle first appeared on the U.S. Census as an unincorporated village in 1910. It continued to report until 1960. Although it has not been completely abandoned, it has not reported a separate population since 1960.
