= Imuruk Basin =

Estuary on Seward Peninsula, Alaska, U.S.

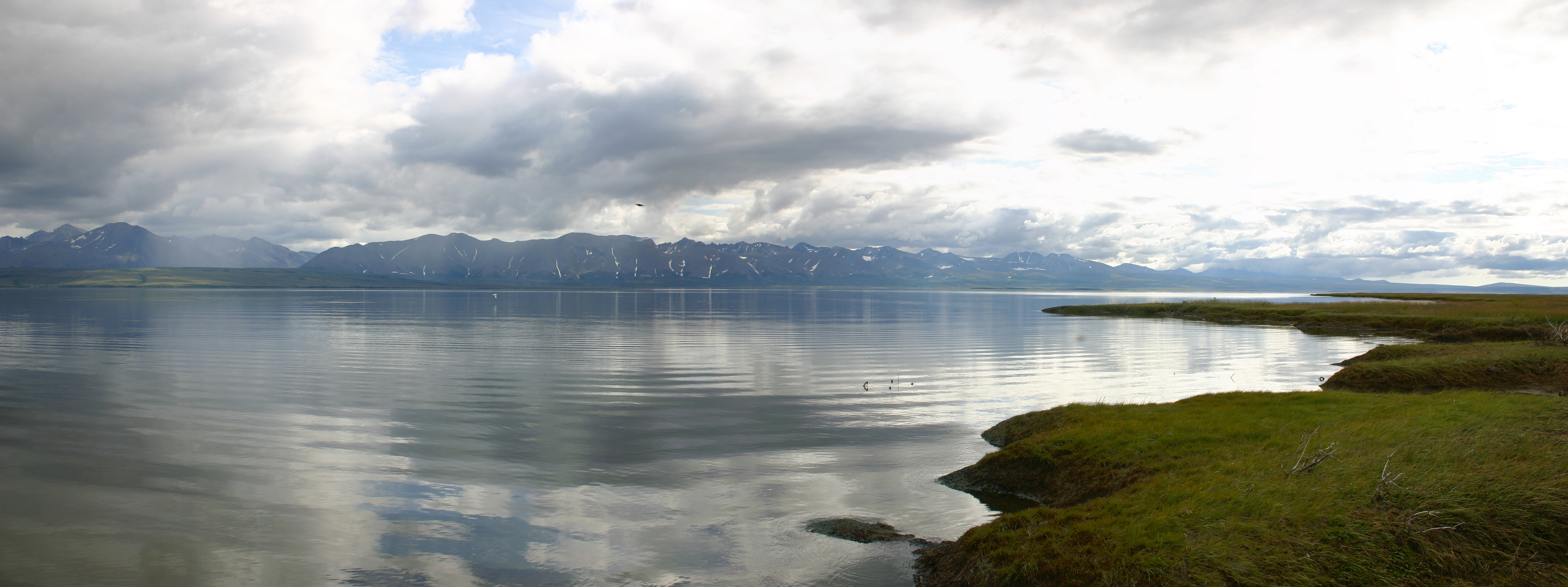
- View of the Imuruk Basin from the north.

- Location within Alaska Location within North America
- Location: Nome Census Area, Alaska, United States
- Coordinates: 65°07′14″N 165°42′00″W
- Primary inflows: Kuzitrin River; Kruzgamepa; Agiapuk River
- Primary outflows: Tuksuk Channel
- Basin countries: United States
- Surface area: ~90 mi^{2} (230 km^{2})
- Max. depth: 20 feet (6 m)
- Surface elevation: 3 feet (1 m)

The Imuruk Basin (Imaġruk or Narvaġruk in Iñupiaq) is an approximately 90 mi^{2} (230 km^{2}), 17-mile (27 km) long shallow estuary located on the Seward Peninsula in the U.S. state of Alaska. The estuary's drainage basin covers about one quarter of the peninsula. The basin is fed by the Kuzitrin, Kruzgamepa, Agiapuk, and Cobblestone Rivers and is drained by the Tuksuk Channel, which empties into Grantley Harbor (Pacific Ocean).

The Imuruk Basin was a strategic waterway for early Iñupiat by providing accessibility to the Bering Sea from the Seward Peninsula's interior.

== See also ==
- Imuruk Lake
