= Agiapuk River =

- Location of the mouth of the Agiapuk River in Alaska

Location
- Country: United States
- State: Alaska
- District: Nome Census Area

Physical characteristics
- Source: Seward Peninsula
  - location: Northeast of Black Mountain
  - coordinates: 65°33′28″N 166°29′45″W
  - elevation: 1,188 ft (362 m)
- Mouth: Imuruk Basin, Bering Sea
  - location: 21 miles (34 km) southeast of Teller
  - coordinates: 65°09′59″N 165°41′02″W
  - elevation: 7 ft (2.1 m)
- Length: 60 mi (97 km)

Agiapuk River (also Agee-ee-puk, Ageepuk, Agiopuk, Ahgeeapuk) is a waterway on the Seward Peninsula in the U.S. state of Alaska. It is a tributary to Grantley Harbor from the north. American River is a main tributary.

== Geography ==
The Agiapuk, flowing into Imuruk Basin from the north, drains an area of from 800 by 1,000 square miles (2,100 km^{2} × 2,600 km^{2}) in the center of Seward Peninsula. The river forks about 20 miles (32 km) north from Imuruk Basin, the eastern and larger branch being called the American River by the prospectors, while the western branch retains the name Agiapuk. Below the forks, the Agiapuk makes many meanders on a broad flood plain, from which the upland rises by gentle slopes to flat-topped hills with elevations of 600–800 feet (180–240 m).

The western branch occupies a broad depression which for about 20 miles (32 km) extends parallel with Grantley Harbor and Port Clarence, from which it is separated by an upland of about 1,000 feet (300 m) elevation. Near its western end, this depression has an altitude of about 500 feet (150 m), and is about 5 miles (8.0 km) wide. The California River drains a part of this depression through a new, deep-cut canyon. The depression is limited on the north by flat-topped mountains, which rise to elevations of 1,000–1,800 feet (300–550 m). The main part of the Agiapuk emerges from a comparatively narrow valley in these mountains into this depressed area.

The Agiapuk Valley below the forks is filled with flood-plain gravels. These gravels extend up the river. These gravels probably occupy a depression which has been at some time either a lake or arm of the sea and filled with sediments. Where the upper end of the depression is cut by the California River, bed rock is exposed in some places. Schists and limestones with later basalts are exposed in the upland lying between the Agiapuk and Grantley Harbor. North of the Agiapuk, the bed rock consists of Silurian limestones of the Port Clarence formation. These limestones are comparatively unaltered and are generally not mineralized to any extent.

== See also ==
- List of rivers of Alaska
