= Nome River =

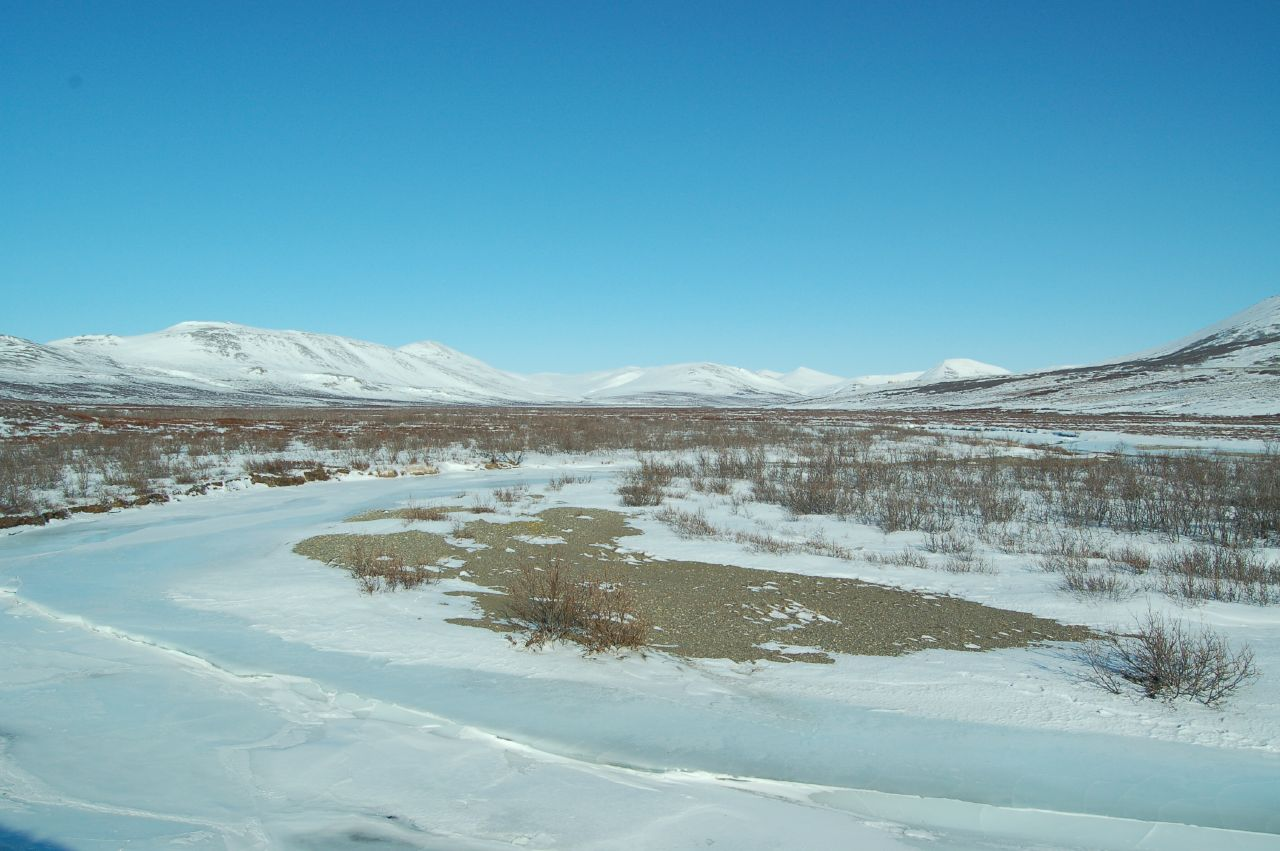
- Nome River Valley

- Location of the mouth of the Nome River in Alaska

Location
- Country: United States
- State: Alaska
- District: Nome Census Area

Physical characteristics
- Source: Seward Peninsula
  - location: 4.5 miles (7.2 km) west of Salmon Lake
  - coordinates: 64°53′06″N 165°14′05″W
  - elevation: 781 ft (238 m)
- Mouth: Norton Sound, Bering Sea
  - location: 4 miles (6.4 km) southeast of Nome
  - coordinates: 64°28′58″N 165°18′18″W
  - elevation: 7 ft (2.1 m)
- Length: 40 mi (64 km)

Nome River is a waterway on the Seward Peninsula in the U.S. state of Alaska. It has its source in a narrow valley in the southern margin of the Kigluaik Mountains, 4.5 miles (7.2 km) west of Salmon Lake.

== Geography ==
The point where Buffalo and Deep Canyon creeks join, which is regarded as its head, is 26 miles (42 km) north of Nome. Its valley is wide and is floored with a deep filling of gravels into which the river channel is incised to a depth ranging from 5 to 50 feet (1.5 to 15.2 m). In several places between Osborn and Darling creeks the river flats reach a width of a mile without attaining an elevation more than 50 feet higher than the top of the river banks. North of Darling Creek the valley narrows decidedly and below Osborn Creek it enters the coastal plain. It leaves this valley as a mountain torrent and debouches in a broad, gravel-filled valley, part of the depression already described, which extends along the southern margin of the Kigluaik Mountains. It flows south for 40 miles (64 km) to Norton Sound at the Bering Sea. The mouth of the river is about 3 miles (5 km) southeast of Nome. The elevation of Nome River at Dexter Creek is less than 50 feet (15 m), which allows the river below that point an average grade of 4 feet per mile (0.8 m/km). From Dexter Creek to Hobson Creek the river level rises 107 feet, or at the rate of 8 feet to the mile, and from Hobson Creek to the mouth of Deep Canyon Creek it rises 393 feet, or at the rate of 44 feet to the mile. The Nome River Valley has the same character as the Eldorado—that is, a broad upper basin, connected by a board pass with Kruzgamepa River waters, and below this basin a constricted valley, and nearer the sea a broad valley whose floor merges into the coastal plain. Most of the mining developments in the coastal plain of the Nome mining district are west of Nome River, but at several localities, prospects have been opened up to the east of the river.

== Tributaries ==
Stevens and Washington gulches flow through the tundra from the hill south of Osborn Creek into Nome River. Buster Creek, flowing from the northeast, enters Nom River a short distance below Dexter Creek; Lillian Creek is a tributary of Buster. Dewey Creek rises in the limestone hills 1.5 miles (2.4 km) north of the head of Lillian Creek and flows into Nome River about 4 miles (6 km) above Buster Creek. Banner Creek is a small stream tributary to Nome River from the west, about 3 miles (5 km) above Dexter Creek. Basin Creek is an easterly tributary of Nom River, about 4 miles (6 km) below Hobson Creek. Hobson Creek joins Nome River about 10 miles (16 km) from the sea; it has a narrow valley and a southerly course. Nil Desperandum Gulch flows into Nome River close to the sea. Dorothy Creek is a tributary to the upper part of Nome River; it flows through a small canyon having a general northerly course.

== See also ==
- List of rivers of Alaska
