= Golovin, Alaska =

Golovin Siŋik (Inupiaq) Cingik (Central Yupik) Головин (Russian)
- City
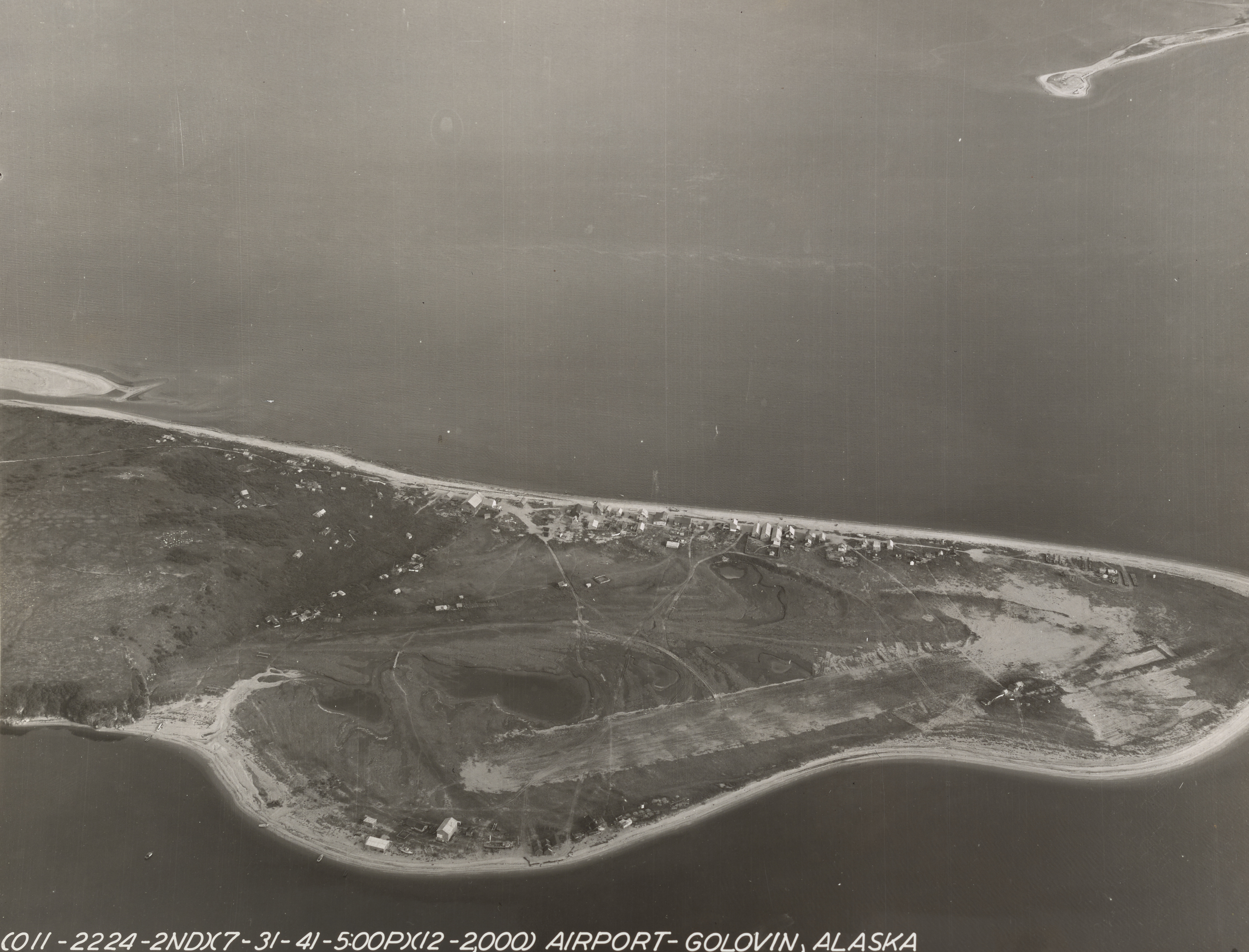
- Golovin, 1941

- Location in Alaska
- Coordinates: 64°32′41″N 163°1′39″W
- Country: United States
- State: Alaska
- Census Area: Nome
- Incorporated: March 26, 1971

Government
  - Mayor: Sierra Smyth
  - State senator: Donald Olson (D)
  - State rep.: Neal Foster (D)

Area
  - Total: 4.14 sq mi (10.71 km^{2})
  - Land: 4.14 sq mi (10.71 km^{2})
  - Water: 0 sq mi (0.00 km^{2})
- Elevation: 43 ft (13 m)

Population (2020)
  - Total: 175
  - Density: 42.3/sq mi (16.34/km^{2})
- Time zone: UTC-9 (Alaska (AKST))
  - Summer (DST): UTC-8 (AKDT)
- ZIP code: 99762
- Area code: 907
- FIPS code: 02-29180
- GNIS feature ID: 1402760

Golovin (formerly Chinik, from Inupiaq: Siŋik or Central Yupik: Cingik; Russian: Головин) is a city in Nome Census Area, Alaska, United States. As of the 2020 census, Golovin had a population of 175.

== Geography ==
Golovin is located at 64°32′41″N 163°1′39″W (64.544612, -163.027459).

Golovin is on a point of land between Golovnin Bay and Golovnin Lagoon on the Seward Peninsula in western Alaska. It is about 105 km (65 mi) east of Nome. The area receives its name from Russian Vice-Admiral Vasily Mikhailovich Golovnin (1776–1831). The town name is misspelled while the bay and lagoon retain the correct spelling.

According to the United States Census Bureau, the city has a total area of 3.7 square miles (9.6 km^{2}), all of it land.

== Demographics ==
Historical population
Census	Pop.	Note	%±
1890	38		—
1900	140		268.4%
1930	135		—
1940	116		−14.1%
1950	94		−19.0%
1960	59		−37.2%
1970	117		98.3%
1980	87		−25.6%
1990	127		46.0%
2000	144		13.4%
2010	156		8.3%
2020	175		12.2%
U.S. Decennial Census

The present city of Golovin appeared on the 1890 U.S. Census as the native village of Ikaleaveagmiut. In 1900, it would report as Cheennik Village (or Dexter), then an unincorporated village. It would not report again until 1930 when the name was officially reported as Golovin. It would formally incorporate as a city in 1971.

There also were reported the settlements of Golofnin Bay (population 25) and Golofnin City (village) (population 185) on the 1890 and 1900 censuses, but these may have been separate areas outside of the present day Golovin, with the former described as consisting of four small Inuit settlements (Siningmon, Netsekawik, Ukodlint & Chillimiut) on an unspecified location in the bay area. The 1900 census considered Golofnin City a successor to Golofnin Bay, though it appeared that this community was located at the site of the Golovin (or Golofnin) Mission, a Swedish Evangelical Union mission and reindeer station, which was along the east side of the Golovnin Bay (now since abandoned). To compound the confusion, a post office (called Golovin) was established at the mission in 1899, but closed in 1906. It was then relocated to the present Golovin in 1908 and kept the same name.

=== 2020 census ===
As of the 2020 census, Golovin had a population of 175. The median age was 30.8 years. 33.1% of residents were under the age of 18 and 9.7% of residents were 65 years of age or older. For every 100 females there were 103.5 males, and for every 100 females age 18 and over there were 116.7 males age 18 and over.

0.0% of residents lived in urban areas, while 100.0% lived in rural areas.

There were 52 households in Golovin, of which 46.2% had children under the age of 18 living in them. Of all households, 40.4% were married-couple households, 30.8% were households with a male householder and no spouse or partner present, and 19.2% were households with a female householder and no spouse or partner present. About 19.2% of all households were made up of individuals and 9.6% had someone living alone who was 65 years of age or older.

There were 59 housing units, of which 11.9% were vacant. The homeowner vacancy rate was 0.0% and the rental vacancy rate was 18.2%.

Racial composition as of the 2020 census
Race	Number	Percent
White	11	6.3%
Black or African American	0	0.0%
American Indian and Alaska Native	159	90.9%
Asian	0	0.0%
Native Hawaiian and Other Pacific Islander	0	0.0%
Some other race	0	0.0%
Two or more races	5	2.9%
Hispanic or Latino (of any race)	1	0.6%

=== 2000 census ===
As of the census of 2000, there were 144 people, 45 households, and 30 families residing in the city. The population density was 38.5 inhabitants per square mile (14.9/km^{2}). There were 54 housing units at an average density of 14.5 per square mile (5.6/km^{2}). The racial makeup of the city was 7.64% White, 84.03% Native American, and 8.33% from two or more races. 2.78% of the population were Hispanic or Latino of any race.

Of the 45 households, 44.4% had children under the age of 18 living with them, 40.0% were married couples living together, 20.0% had a female householder with no husband present, and 33.3% were non-families. 31.1% of all households were made up of individuals, and 6.7% had someone living alone who was 65 years of age or older. The average household size was 3.20 and the average family size was 4.17.

In the city, the age distribution of the population shows 42.4% under the age of 18, 6.3% from 18 to 24, 28.5% from 25 to 44, 16.7% from 45 to 64, and 6.3% who were 65 years of age or older. The median age was 26 years. For every 100 females, there were 118.2 males. For every 100 females age 18 and over, there were 118.4 males.

The median income for a household in the city was $31,875, and the median income for a family was $41,250. Males had a median income of $25,625 versus $31,250 for females. The per capita income for the city was $13,281. There were none of the families and 4.3% of the population living below the poverty line, including no under eighteens and none of those over 64.

== History ==
Golovin was originally an Inupiat village called Chiŋik.

Golovin was named for Captain Vasily Golovnin of the Russian Navy, who visited Alaska to inspect the workings of the Russian-American Company in 1807–1809, in the Diana, and in 1817–1819, in the Kamchatka, while circumnavigating the world. Lt. Lavrenty Zagoskin, from the Imperial Russian Navy sent to Alaska to scout locations for trading posts, reported the village as "Ikalikguigmyut" in 1842. In 1867, the Mission Covenant of Sweden established a church and school south of the current site of Golovin. Around 1890, John Dexter established a trading post that became the center for swapping prospecting information for the entire Seward Peninsula. Gold was discovered in 1898 at Council and Golovin became a supply point for the gold fields. Supplies were unloaded from ships at Golovin and shipped across Golovnin Lagoon and up the Fish and Niukluk Rivers to Council.

When gold was discovered in what is now Nome, much of the mining and shipping activity moved there and Golovin declined in population.

Reindeer herding was introduced in the area about 1900.

Golovin is used as a checkpoint on the Iditarod in Nome, Alaska.

== Notable people ==
- Donny Olson, Alaska State Senator, attorney, commercial pilot, physician, and reindeer herder.
