= Grand Central River =

- Location of the mouth of the Grand Central River in Alaska

Location
- Country: United States
- State: Alaska
- District: Nome Census Area

Physical characteristics
- Source: Confluence of the stream's east and west forks
  - location: Kigluaik Mountains, Seward Peninsula
  - coordinates: 64°58′06″N 165°14′16″W
  - elevation: 693 ft (211 m)
- Mouth: Salmon Lake
  - location: 28 miles (45 km) northeast of Nome
  - coordinates: 64°53′47″N 165°04′34″W
  - elevation: 443 ft (135 m)
- Length: 12 mi (19 km)

Grand Central River is a waterway on the Seward Peninsula in the U.S. state of Alaska. It enters Salmon Lake from the west. Although the Grand Central and Kruzgamepa (or Pilgrim) rivers form one stream, their names differ, and their physical features vary. The Grand Central flows into Salmon Lake, while the Kruzgamepa flows out.

== Geography ==
The river is about 12 miles (19 km) long and 2 miles (3 km) wide. The drainage area of this stream is almost surrounded by ridges of the Sawtooth Range (Kigluaik Mountains), having elevations of 1,500 to 4,000 feet (460 to 1,220 m). The river is formed near the foot of Mount Osborn, at an elevation of about 700 feet (210 m), by the junction of North and West forks, and flows in a southerly direction into Salmon Lake. From the forks to Salmon Lake, the river has a fall of about 300 feet (91 m), and at high stages, spreads over a wide gravel bed. On either side, there is a little bottom land, from which the mountains rise abruptly. The principal tributaries of Grand Central River below the forks are Gold Run and Rainbow Creek from the east, and Thompson, Thumit, Nugget, Jett, and Morning Call creeks from the west. These tributary streams, with the exception of Nugget Creek, drain short, steep-sided gulches. They have considerable fall and are fed from melting snow.

== See also ==
- List of rivers of Alaska
