= Brooks Mountain =

Mountain in Alaska, United States

- Location within Alaska
- Interactive map of Brooks Mountain

Highest point
- Elevation: 2,918 ft (889 m)
- Coordinates: 65.53694°N 167.14333°W

Geography
- Location: Seward Peninsula, Alaska
- Parent range: York Mountains

Brooks Mountain is the highest peak in the York Mountains range on the Seward Peninsula in the U.S. state of Alaska. It is located in the central part of the Teller Quadrangle, about 25 miles (40 km) east of Cape Prince of Wales. It has an elevation of 2,918 feet (889 m). It has tin ore deposits, and high-grade uranium has also been found in the form of zeunerite.

== Geography ==
Brooks Mountain is an extension of the York Mountain Range and is its highest peak. The York Mountains range forms the watershed divide between north flowing rivers which flow into the Arctic Ocean and the streams that flow into the Bering Sea on the south. The principal rivers rising from the Brooks Mountain are the Mint River, York Creek which joins the Pinauk River, Anderson Creek tributary of the Don River and the Crystal River which is a tributary of the Lost River.

The mountain is located about 11 miles (18 km) north of the mouth of Lost River and is approachable by a road starting from the beach. An alternate route is from Port Clarence along a road that follows the Don River course. There is a small airstrip near the mountain above the Crystal Creek, and also two more airstrips near the mouth of the Lost River.

== Geology ==
Geology of the mountain has been studied since 1902. The mountain formation has been reported to be an igneous sedimentary rock formation with granite (in a limited area of 1.75 square miles (4.5 km^{2})), felsic and mafic dykes. Granites in the southwest face of the mountain contain Zeunerite, a form of uranium. Its age is conjectured to be Mesozoic with intrusions of black slate formations which are in turn dated to the formations of the Cambrian and Pre-Cambrian age. The limestone formations of the Fort Clarence Limestone series are dated to a different set of formations of the Ordovician, Silurian and Devonian age.

Geological mapping of the mountain also indicates that exposed bed rock formations are of highly altered limestones rocks and black slates, similar to the formation noted of slates near York Mountains. These are sedimentary formations which are interspersed with many dykes of granite and rhyolite, generally oriented in an east and west strike. Tourmaline and garnet are also recorded. Tin Creek and Cassiterite Creek, about 1 mile (1.6 km) south of Brooks Mountain, have tin ore deposits in tourmaline and garnet rocks.

== Uranium ==
Radiometric survey and mineralogical studies have been carried out since 1950, which has assessed that the mountain formation contains high-grade uranium. Detailed investigations were also carried out during July–August 1951. Uranium was found mainly in the form of zeunerite at three locations though other rock types showed a certain degree of radioactivity.
