= List of mountains in Mineral County, Montana =

There are at least 86 named mountains in Mineral County, Montana.

- Bald Hill, 47°15′10″N 114°58′23″W, el. 5,151 feet (1,570 m)
- Bald Mountain, 47°22′56″N 115°37′15″W, el. 6,017 feet (1,834 m)
- Bear Point, 46°55′27″N 114°43′37″W, el. 3,770 feet (1,150 m)
- Black Peak, 47°10′58″N 115°16′21″W, el. 6,489 feet (1,978 m)
- Blacktail Mountain, 47°10′32″N 115°00′38″W, el. 6,122 feet (1,866 m)
- Boyd Mountain, 47°20′06″N 115°13′29″W, el. 5,338 feet (1,627 m)
- Brooks Mountain, 47°25′29″N 115°17′42″W, el. 5,699 feet (1,737 m)
- Cameron Peak, 47°26′36″N 115°21′56″W, el. 6,063 feet (1,848 m)
- Cedar Peak, 46°52′43″N 114°50′00″W, el. 5,810 feet (1,770 m)
- Chimney Rock, 47°08′41″N 114°52′48″W, el. 5,164 feet (1,574 m)
- Cobden Peak, 47°06′32″N 114°44′52″W, el. 4,268 feet (1,301 m)
- Cold Peak, 47°16′03″N 115°06′52″W, el. 4,974 feet (1,516 m)
- Crater Mountain, 46°55′21″N 114°53′59″W, el. 7,569 feet (2,307 m)
- Cruzane Mountain, 47°25′11″N 115°29′43″W, el. 4,856 feet (1,480 m)
- Cyr Peak, 46°59′42″N 114°38′20″W, el. 5,502 feet (1,677 m)
- Deer Peak, 46°54′48″N 114°34′17″W, el. 6,703 feet (2,043 m)
- Dominion Peak, 47°22′02″N 115°34′42″W, el. 5,991 feet (1,826 m)
- Drury Peak, 47°24′16″N 115°06′18″W, el. 5,463 feet (1,665 m)
- Eagle Peak, 47°16′58″N 115°23′02″W, el. 7,237 feet (2,206 m)
- Eagle Rock, 47°04′34″N 114°54′46″W, el. 4,685 feet (1,428 m)
- Flattop Mountain, 47°14′41″N 115°19′27″W, el. 6,368 feet (1,941 m)
- Ford Hill, 47°27′36″N 115°37′11″W, el. 5,194 feet (1,583 m)
- Goat Mountain, 47°26′15″N 115°21′37″W, el. 5,935 feet (1,809 m)
- Gold Peak, 47°17′44″N 115°22′46″W, el. 7,027 feet (2,142 m)
- Graham Mountain, 47°03′49″N 114°43′34″W, el. 4,167 feet (1,270 m)
- Granite Peak, 46°42′59″N 114°42′43″W, el. 7,566 feet (2,306 m)
- Graves Peak, 47°00′49″N 115°04′20″W, el. 7,300 feet (2,200 m)
- Greenwood Hill, 47°26′53″N 115°09′27″W, el. 6,437 feet (1,962 m)
- Haugan Mountain, 47°22′53″N 115°26′27″W, el. 4,764 feet (1,452 m)
- Hawk Mountain, 47°27′06″N 115°24′25″W, el. 5,564 feet (1,696 m)
- Hemlock Mountain, 47°25′58″N 115°33′22″W, el. 5,659 feet (1,725 m)
- Henderson Hill, 47°22′52″N 115°19′52″W, el. 4,094 feet (1,248 m)
- Illinois Peak, 47°01′36″N 115°04′16″W, el. 7,667 feet (2,337 m)
- Keystone Peak, 47°17′38″N 114°54′23″W, el. 5,843 feet (1,781 m)
- Landowner Mountain, 47°01′25″N 114°56′27″W, el. 6,952 feet (2,119 m)
- Lightning Peak, 46°58′19″N 114°56′59″W, el. 7,369 feet (2,246 m)
- Lion Point, 46°52′08″N 114°42′29″W, el. 5,417 feet (1,651 m)
- Little Joe Mountain, 47°09′19″N 115°14′53″W, el. 7,093 feet (2,162 m)
- Little Phoebe Mountain, 46°59′15″N 114°57′40″W, el. 6,732 feet (2,052 m)
- Lookout Mountain, 47°08′04″N 114°38′25″W, el. 7,083 feet (2,159 m)
- Lost Peak, 47°07′17″N 115°08′03″W, el. 7,408 feet (2,258 m)
- Magone Mountain, 47°06′31″N 114°51′10″W, el. 5,515 feet (1,681 m)
- Martel Mountain, 47°01′45″N 114°41′23″W, el. 5,118 feet (1,560 m)
- McGee Peak, 47°18′22″N 115°25′45″W, el. 6,316 feet (1,925 m)
- McMullan Peak, 46°59′21″N 114°47′58″W, el. 5,728 feet (1,746 m)
- Meadow Mountain, 47°26′14″N 115°29′32″W, el. 4,442 feet (1,354 m)
- Miller Mountain, 47°04′59″N 114°42′28″W, el. 5,315 feet (1,620 m)
- Mint Peak, 47°06′12″N 115°06′56″W, el. 6,854 feet (2,089 m)
- Moon Peak, 47°19′28″N 115°18′21″W, el. 5,673 feet (1,729 m)
- Mount Baldy, 47°10′01″N 115°02′04″W, el. 6,903 feet (2,104 m)
- Needle Point, 46°55′19″N 114°45′37″W, el. 4,511 feet (1,375 m)
- Newman Peak, 47°16′17″N 115°16′59″W, el. 5,571 feet (1,698 m)
- Olson Peak, 47°23′21″N 115°03′34″W, el. 5,253 feet (1,601 m)
- Oregon Peak, 47°03′29″N 115°06′08″W, el. 7,178 feet (2,188 m)
- Petes Point, 47°24′18″N 115°32′12″W, el. 5,302 feet (1,616 m)
- Prospect Mountain Number One, 47°03′04″N 115°00′56″W, el. 7,024 feet (2,141 m)
- Prospect Mountain Number Two, 47°02′18″N 115°00′17″W, el. 6,896 feet (2,102 m)
- Quartz Peak, 47°01′37″N 114°46′32″W, el. 3,934 feet (1,199 m)
- Red Hill, 47°16′03″N 115°03′42″W, el. 2,999 feet (914 m)
- Rivers Peak, 47°20′27″N 115°27′59″W, el. 5,285 feet (1,611 m)
- Rivulet Peak, 46°59′27″N 114°45′01″W, el. 4,728 feet (1,441 m)
- Rock Creek Vista, 47°25′09″N 115°18′49″W, el. 4,915 feet (1,498 m)
- Round Mountain, 47°03′06″N 114°42′54″W, el. 4,206 feet (1,282 m)
- Runt Mountain, 47°27′13″N 115°42′28″W, el. 5,535 feet (1,687 m)
- Saint Patrick Peak, 46°58′33″N 114°50′53″W, el. 6,995 feet (2,132 m)
- Saltese Mountain, 47°23′56″N 115°33′04″W, el. 5,535 feet (1,687 m)
- Schley Mountain, 46°48′36″N 114°46′17″W, el. 7,316 feet (2,230 m)
- Shale Mountain, 46°42′51″N 114°47′16″W, el. 7,562 feet (2,305 m)
- Sheep Mountain, 47°10′52″N 115°03′16″W, el. 6,713 feet (2,046 m)
- Stark Mountain, 47°05′20″N 114°34′20″W, el. 7,339 feet (2,237 m)
- Storm Peak, 47°22′10″N 115°31′39″W, el. 5,617 feet (1,712 m)
- Straight Peak, 46°53′00″N 114°53′25″W, el. 7,605 feet (2,318 m)
- Sunrise Mountain, 47°01′49″N 114°53′29″W, el. 6,962 feet (2,122 m)
- Sunrise Point, 47°03′32″N 114°50′41″W, el. 5,374 feet (1,638 m)
- Sunset Peak, 47°13′32″N 115°13′28″W, el. 5,732 feet (1,747 m)
- Taft Peak, 47°26′54″N 115°36′46″W, el. 5,968 feet (1,819 m)
- Tamarack Hill, 47°20′18″N 115°02′22″W, el. 4,147 feet (1,264 m)
- Tarbox Hill, 47°27′58″N 115°30′45″W, el. 5,627 feet (1,715 m)
- Thompson Peak, 47°10′35″N 114°55′08″W, el. 4,324 feet (1,318 m)
- Torino Peak, 47°09′41″N 115°11′40″W, el. 6,886 feet (2,099 m)
- Up Up Mountain, 47°19′57″N 115°20′37″W, el. 5,964 feet (1,818 m)
- Van Ness Point, 47°05′38″N 114°58′29″W, el. 6,690 feet (2,040 m)
- Wade Peak, 47°07′19″N 115°05′16″W, el. 6,083 feet (1,854 m)
- Ward Peak, 47°15′58″N 115°22′57″W, el. 7,221 feet (2,201 m)
- White Mountain, 46°47′03″N 114°38′37″W, el. 6,516 feet (1,986 m)
- Williams Peak, 46°57′26″N 114°41′55″W, el. 5,417 feet (1,651 m)

== See also ==
- List of mountains in Montana
- List of mountain ranges in Montana
