= Tubutulik River =

- Location of the mouth of the Tubutulik River in Alaska
- Etymology: Eskimo–Aleut languages

Location
- Country: United States
- State: Alaska
- Region: Seward Peninsula
- District: Nome Census Area

Physical characteristics
- Source: Bendeleben Mountains
  - coordinates: 65°15′49″N 162°34′57″W
  - elevation: 1,865 ft (568 m)
- Mouth: Kwiniuk Inlet on Norton Bay
  - location: 25 miles (40 km) southwest of Koyuk
  - coordinates: 64°44′22″N 161°53′17″W
- Length: 25 mi (40 km)

The Tubutulik River is a waterway in the U.S. state of Alaska. The 25-mile (40 km) long river is situated on the Seward Peninsula. It flows southeastwards to the Kwiniuk Inlet at the northwestern end of Norton Bay, 25 miles (40 km) southwest of Koyuk in the Bering Sea. Its Inuit name was reported as "Tubuktulik" in 1849 by Capt. Mikhail Dmitrievich Tebenkov of the Imperial Russian Navy. Exploration for placer gold occurred in the Council district area where the river valley is located, and in 1898, mining commenced. The production was substantial and ranked second only to that of Nome.

== Geography ==
The river is located on the Seward Peninsula of northwestern Alaska. It rises from the southern flank of the Bendeleben Mountains. A geological fault was noted running from the Bendeleben Mountains to the east of the river's headwater. The long waterway flows generally parallel to the mountains whereas its tributaries flow perpendicular to the mountain range. Erosion is a common phenomenon in the river valley; there are many lakes and sloughs.

The first 17–18 miles (27–29 km) of Tubutulik River, like the lower course of the Fish River, is a tortuous channel through alluvial flats built out from material that it brought down from its upper course. After the flats, there is a more restricted valley with the high hills of the Cape Darby granite area to the west and the softer forms of the limestone and schist on the east. Its course passes the mouth of Chukajak Creek. Vulcan Creek and its tributaries enter the main river from the west. Vulcan Point is located on Vulcan Creek. Continuing upstream on the Tubutulik is the lower end of a narrow canyon. Above the canyon, the stream valley broadens out again into a basin of a smaller area but otherwise similar to that of Fish River and is connected with the latter by a low pass used in winter in making the overland trip from Golovnin Bay to Kotzebue Sound. The limits of this basin can be seen from the Bendeleben Mountains. A sand spit lies opposite the mouth of the river.

Tubutulik River flows for the greater part of its course through the hilly region which separates the Koyuk and Fish River valleys. It rises in a group of granite mountains south of the source of the Koyuk, flows out into a small basin quite like that of Fish River, though much smaller in area, and enters the hills again at about latitude 65° 10'. From this point it continues, with many loops and bends and variations in the width of its valley, until it passes into its delta plain, 11–12 miles (18–19 km) above its mouth. Its largest tributary, Clear Creek, flows in from the southwest about 30 miles (48 km) from salt water. Other smaller branches are Vulcan, Chukajak, Admiral, Grouse, and Lost creeks. The first two of these are the only streams belonging to the Tubutulik drainage system The lower course of the river lies in a fluvial plain consisting partly of fresh-water and partly of salt-water marshes, built up by the detrital material carried by the river itself and deposited beyond its mouth in the form of mud, sand, and gravel. The river discharges into a lagoon back of a long island sand spit. This lagoon also receives at its western end the waters of Kwiniuk River.

== Wildlife ==
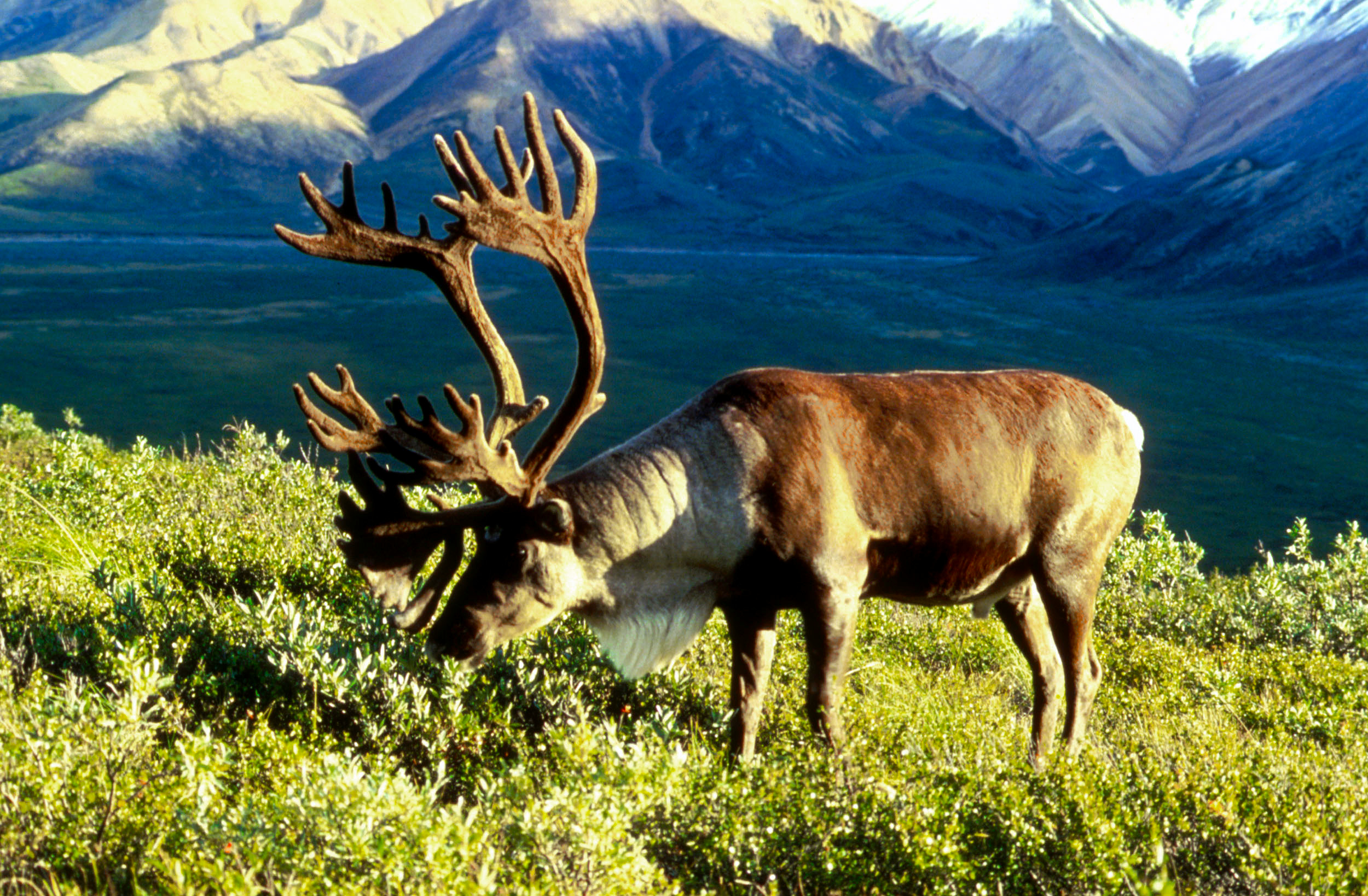
Caribou in Alaska

The watershed, particularly in the Norton Sound area, is an important habitat for many species of Pacific salmon and fish species. The watershed is also a habitat for migratory birds, and caribou of the Western Arctic herd forage there.

== Geology ==
The drainage basin of the river has many geological formations such as a wide belt of granite crossing the Kwinium river to the south.

Gold mining in the river basin began in 1900 after panning of the surface gravels uncovered coarse gold. Conglomerates were also noted in the bed of the river. Basalt formations were also recorded in the head waters between the Tubutulik River and Grouse Creek.

The radioactivity recorded in the area was tested and found to be concentrated in the Tubutulik River and its tributaries at many locations. Three areas on the Tubutulik River contain abnormal radioactivity. Samples were taken from the granite rocks of the river valley including the tributaries and tested. The test results revealed radioactive uranium concentrations of more than 0.2% of equivalent uranium.

== Watershed management ==
Infrastructure development within the mining area included railroads, and a port. These activities created environmental problems in the form of threat to fish and wildlife habitat. The Watershed Council is currently working to remedy the situation, in association with the Native Alaskan Tribal Government and the Norton Bay Inter-Tribal Watershed Council (NBITWC).

== See also ==
- List of rivers of Alaska

== Bibliography ==
- Smith, Philip Sidney; Eakin, Henry Miner (1911). A geologic reconnaissance in southeastern Seward Peninsula and the Norton Bay-Nulato region, Alaska. Government Printing Office. pp. 115–116.
