= Pinguk River =

- Location of the mouth of the Pinguk River in Alaska
- Etymology: Iñupiaq language
- Nickname: Pinauk
- Native name: Pinauk (Inupiaq)

Location
- Country: United States
- State: Alaska
- Region: Northwestern Alaska

Physical characteristics
- Source: Seward Peninsula of western Alaska
  - location: Brooks Mountain, Alaska, United States
  - coordinates: 65°51′07″N 167°09′23″W
- Mouth: Arctic Ocean
  - location: Arctic Ocean, Alaska, United States

Pinguk River (alternate Iñupiaq language name, Pinauk meaning "hill") is a waterway located on the Seward Peninsula in the U.S. state of Alaska. The river runs in a northwesterly direction for 34 miles (55 km) and then flows into the Arctic Lagoon about 30 miles (48 km) northeast of Cape Prince of Wales.

== River course ==
The river flows over a length of 34 miles (55 km) in a zigzag course. Before the river joins the sea, at about 10 miles (16 km) upstream it forms two branches; the western branch is called the York River and the eastern branch is called the McKillop River.

The York River rises on the eastern flanks of Brooks Mountain, the highest point in the York Mountains, in the central part of the Teller Quadrangle. It flows in a northeast direction and then confluences with the McKillop River. The river flows through a valley formation of 200–300 feet (61–91 m) width. The geological formation reported in the valley consists of slate and is exposed in some stretches of the river. The river bed is strewn with gravel and pebbles of slate and limestone. The gravel and pebbles have their origin in the Kuzitrin series. The limestones are derivatives of the Port Clarence limestones.

The McKillop branch has its source in the limestone hills, which are an eastern arm of the York Mountains. The geological formation in this river valley is made up only of limestones and belongs to the Port Clarence formation.

== Minerals ==
The York River, a branch of the Pinguk River, which rises in the Brooks Mountain, is reported to be rich in tin deposits in its head reaches in the mountains. The river bed is strewn with pebbles, boulders and granites, which is an indication that tin was embedded in granite contact zone in granite formations in the hills. However, no gold has been found in this river valley.
