= White Mountain, Alaska =

White Mountain Nasirvik (Inupiaq)
- City
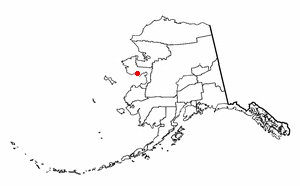
- Location of White Mountain, Alaska
- Coordinates: 64°40′51″N 163°24′24″W
- Country: United States
- State: Alaska
- Census area: Nome
- Incorporated: July 15, 1969

Government
  - Mayor: Daniel Harrelson
  - State senator: Donald Olson (D)
  - State rep.: Neal Foster (D)

Area
  - Total: 2.05 sq mi (5.30 km^{2})
  - Land: 1.83 sq mi (4.73 km^{2})
  - Water: 0.22 sq mi (0.57 km^{2})
- Elevation: 62 ft (19 m)

Population (2020)
  - Total: 185
  - Density: 101.4/sq mi (39.14/km^{2})
- Time zone: UTC-9 (Alaska (AKST))
  - Summer (DST): UTC-8 (AKDT)
- ZIP code: 99784
- Area code: 907
- FIPS code: 02-84070
- GNIS feature ID: 1411989

White Mountain (Inupiaq: Nasirvik, Nachirvik, or Nachizrvik) is a city in Nome Census Area, Alaska, United States. As of the 2020 census, White Mountain had a population of 185. The city is an Iġaluŋmiut (Fish River tribe) Inupiat village, with historical influences from and relationships with Qawiaraq (Mary's Igloo) Inupiat and Golovin and Elim Yup’iks. 86.2% of the population is Alaska Native or part Native. Subsistence activities are prevalent. White Mountain is the only village on the Seward Peninsula located inland, not on the ocean.

== History ==
The area that is present day White Mountain began as the Eskimo fish camp Nachirvik which means "mountain look-out point." The bountiful resources of both the Niukluk and the Fish rivers supported the Native populations there. The community grew with the influx of white prospectors during the Klondike Gold Rush. The first non-Native structure was a warehouse built by the miner Charles D. Lane to store supplies for his claim in the Council District. It was the site of a government-subsidized orphanage, which became an industrial school in 1926. The Covenant Church was built in 1937. A Russian Orthodox Church was built about 1920 (although no longer utilized, the church log cabin building is still standing). A post office was opened in 1932. The tribal government re-organized under the Indian Reorganization Act (IRA) in 1939. The city was incorporated in 1969.

Today, White Mountain is most notable as the last of three mandatory rest stops for teams competing in the annual Iditarod. All mushers are required to take an 8-hour rest stop at White Mountain before making the final push to the end of the race, 77 miles (124 km) away in Nome.

== Geography ==
White Mountain is located at 64°40′51″N 163°24′24″W (64.680856, -163.406538). The city is located on the eastern bank of the Fish River.

According to the United States Census Bureau, the city has a total area of 2.0 square miles (5.3 km^{2}), of which 1.8 square miles (4.6 km^{2}) is land and 0.2 square miles (0.6 km^{2}) (11.82%) is water.

== Demographics ==
Historical population
Census	Pop.	Note	%±
1920	198		—
1930	205		3.5%
1940	199		−2.9%
1950	129		−35.2%
1960	151		17.1%
1970	87		−42.4%
1980	125		43.7%
1990	180		44.0%
2000	203		12.8%
2010	190		−6.4%
2020	185		−2.6%
U.S. Decennial Census

White Mountain first appeared on the 1920 U.S. Census as an unincorporated village. It formally incorporated in 1969.

=== 2020 census ===
As of the 2020 census, White Mountain had a population of 185. The median age was 29.5 years. 35.7% of residents were under the age of 18 and 10.3% of residents were 65 years of age or older. For every 100 females there were 125.6 males, and for every 100 females age 18 and over there were 124.5 males age 18 and over.

0.0% of residents lived in urban areas, while 100.0% lived in rural areas.

There were 67 households in White Mountain, of which 31.3% had children under the age of 18 living in them. Of all households, 16.4% were married-couple households, 35.8% were households with a male householder and no spouse or partner present, and 37.3% were households with a female householder and no spouse or partner present. About 35.8% of all households were made up of individuals and 9.0% had someone living alone who was 65 years of age or older.

There were 93 housing units, of which 28.0% were vacant. The homeowner vacancy rate was 0.0% and the rental vacancy rate was 30.2%.

Racial composition as of the 2020 census
Race	Number	Percent
White	12	6.5%
Black or African American	0	0.0%
American Indian and Alaska Native	171	92.4%
Asian	0	0.0%
Native Hawaiian and Other Pacific Islander	0	0.0%
Some other race	0	0.0%
Two or more races	2	1.1%
Hispanic or Latino (of any race)	0	0.0%

=== 2000 census ===
As of the 2000 census, there were 203 people, 69 households, and 46 families residing in the city. The population density was 113.7 inhabitants per square mile (43.9/km^{2}). There were 75 housing units at an average density of 42.0 per square mile (16.2/km^{2}). The racial makeup of the city was 13.30% White, 83.74% Native American, 0.49% from other races, and 2.46% from two or more races. Hispanic or Latino of any race were 0.49% of the population.

Of the 69 households, 43.5% had children under the age of 18 living with them, 24.6% were married couples living together, 26.1% had a female householder with no husband present, and 31.9% were non-families. 30.4% of all households were made up of individuals, and 7.2% had someone living alone who was 65 years of age or older. The average household size was 2.94 and the average family size was 3.55.

In the city, the population was spread out, with 40.4% under the age of 18, 5.4% from 18 to 24, 24.6% from 25 to 44, 22.2% from 45 to 64, and 7.4% who were 65 years of age or older. The median age was 29 years. For every 100 females, there were 109.3 males. For every 100 females age 18 and over, there were 132.7 males.

The median income for a household in the city was $25,833, and the median income for a family was $29,688. Males had a median income of $41,250 versus $31,250 for females. The per capita income for the city was $10,034. About 16.3% of families and 22.4% of the population were below the poverty line, including 15.1% of those under the age of eighteen and 12.5% of those 65 or over.

== Education ==
White Mountain is served by the Bering Strait School District. White Mountain School serves grades Pre-K through 12. Prior to the 2009 school year, students were housed in two different buildings, the high school building and the elementary building. In February 2006, the high school building burned down as a result from a fire in the furnace room. High school and Jr. High students moved to three separate buildings and schooled there until the end of the 2008 school year. The elementary school was the oldest operating school building in Alaska up until 2009 when the new school building was completed. The old elementary building was burned down in the summer 2010 because there was no longer a use for it. The new White Mountain School is one building that has three elementary rooms for K-6 students, a Jr. High room, two Sr. High rooms, a gymnasium, a cafeteria, library, a staff room and storage rooms.
