= List of killings by law enforcement officers in the United States, March 2010 =

This is a list of people reported killed by non-military law enforcement officers in the United States in March 2010, whether in the line of duty or not, and regardless of reason or method. The listing documents the occurrence of a death, making no implications regarding wrongdoing or justification on the part of the person killed or officer involved. Killings are arranged by date of the incident that caused death. Different death dates, if known, are noted in the description. The table below lists 44 people.

== March 2010 ==
| Date | Name (Age) of Deceased | State (city) | Description |
|---|---|---|---|
| 2010-03-31 | Susan L. Stuckey (47) | Kansas (Prairie Village) | Police said the woman made "suicidal and threatening comments", and barricaded herself in her apartment. She was shot by officers after allegedly threatening the officers with a weapon. |
| 2010-03-31 | Albert Davis (27) | Florida (Lakeland) | |
| 2010-03-30 | Chester Guyton (67) | Pennsylvania (Bedford County) | Troopers were dispatched to a residence to check a report of a distraught male. They discovered that Guyton was in possession of firearms and threatening to harm himself and others while inside his residence. Guyton then began walking around his yard with the handgun. Troopers tried to negotiate with Guyton for more than 90 minutes. However, Guyton allegedly pointed a loaded handgun at a trooper, prompting a trooper to fire on Guyton. |
| 2010-03-30 | Randy Wayne Mullins (25) | California (Escondido) | Two officers responding to a report of a domestic disturbance at the duplex where Mullins lived with his wife had arrived to hear a woman crying and a man yelling inside the residence, authorities said. After the officers knocked on the door, Mullins appeared with a shotgun in his hand, and one of the officers grabbed it and tried to wrestle it away. During the struggle, the resident appeared to be trying to point the weapon at the second officer, who responded by firing multiple shots in defense of his life. |
| 2010-03-29 | Mickey Owings (26) | New Mexico (Albuquerque) | Albuquerque Police received a tip that a vehicle involved in a robbery was parked at a Walmart. Detectives set up surveillance of the vehicle. Eventually a man and woman got into a Jeep parked next to the suspected robbery vehicle. The man matched the description of the robbery suspect, so police closed in and blocked the Jeep from escaping. The man started driving into police cars. An officer fired at the car, at least one of which struck the man. The Jeep fled down the wrong lane of a road before the suspect lost consciousness. According to a lawsuit filed in 2014, Owings was unarmed at the time. |
| 2010-03-29 | Robert "Bobby" Thomas Wilson (27) | Minnesota (Cottage Grove) | An officer pulled over a vehicle which had been connected to recent counterfeit-currency incidents. The vehicle stopped, but as the officer approached, the driver changed his mind. The officer got caught in the vehicle and was dragged over 500 feet. As a result, the officer drew his gun and fatally wounded the driver. |
| 2010-03-29 | William Hardy (27) | Illinois (Chicago) | Police, however, said Hardy turned and pointed a gun at officers when he was told to stop during an incident near Hirsch Street and Mayfield Avenue. |
| 2010-03-28 | Linda Carol Clark (38) | California (Placerville) | Clark, a female patient at Marshall Medical Center stole an ambulance and led officers on a chase. The ambulance struck a patrol car and the impact pushed it into two additional patrol units. Fearing for his life and trying to stop the ambulance, an officer fired his service weapon, firing five shots. One of the shots hit Clark. |
| 2010-03-28 | Wesley Alan Doyle (27) | Georgia (Cartersville) | Shot after turning on police with pistol in hand. Police were responding to report of man urinating in public. Doyle fled when approached and was chased. |
| 2010-03-27 | Mario Jaramillo (43) | California (Inglewood) | Mario Jaramillo, a 43-year-old Latino, was shot by police after stabbing himself March 27, said authorities. Officers were called to City Farm Market by employees who reported that a man was in the store threatening people with a knife, according authorities. Upon arrival, officers were informed that the man had been stabbing himself and was hiding in a walk-in refrigerator. The suspect exited the refrigerator holding an ax and made a movement toward an officer, a statement said. Two officers shot the man multiple times, police said. |
| 2010-03-26 | Aaron McCausland (42) | Michigan (Centreville) | Armed with a shotgun and surrounded by police, McCausland was shot by two St. Joseph County Sheriff's deputies from a handgun and an assault rifle. A wounded McCausland squeezed off three shots. |
| 2010-03-26 | Jeremiah Mathis (31) | Florida (Jacksonville) | |
| 2010-03-26 | Todd Ely White (46) | Washington (Spokane) | Shot after firing four times at officers. Police were responding to report of a man carrying gun in neighborhood. |
| 2010-03-23 | Damon Beal (26) | Nevada (Las Vegas) | Beal ran from the officers, then pulled a gun and started shooting at the officers, striking Officer Madland. Madland's partner returned fire and killed the man, who police identified as 26-year-old Damon Beal. |
| 2010-03-23 | Allen Hunter (44) | Florida (Lantana) | |
| 2010-03-22 | Jack Collins (58) | Oregon (Portland) | |
| 2010-03-22 | William Gordon | Georgia (Midway) | Shot after shooting at police. The man's vehicle was stopped as matching the description from a recent burglary. |
| 2010-03-21 | Thomas Tavon Miller (30) | Maryland (Baltimore) | One of the officers and the 30-year-old driver of the vehicle got into an altercation. The suspect was able to break free and get back to his vehicle, where he drew a .25 caliber semi-automatic handgun and opened fire, Bealefeld said. One of the officers was struck in the right cheek, and another was hit in the hand. The suspect was hit several times and died at the scene. |
| 2010-03-20 | David Renauld Rogers (21) | Texas (Houston) | While Rogers and an accomplice allegedly attempted a robbery he was fatally shot by one of the responding officers as Hill and Rogers ran out of the store. Rogers had pointed a gun at the officers. One of the officers warned Rogers to put his weapon down, but when Rogers refused to do so, the officer who feared for his life shot his weapon at Rogers. |
| 2010-03-20 | Stephen Bours (30) | California (Downey) | Stephen Bours, a 30-year-old white man, was shot and killed by police March 20 in Downey, according authorities. Bours was wielding and ax and walking north in the middle of the southbound lanes of Paramount Boulevard about 6:30 p.m., said authorities. Officers ordered Bours several times to stop and drop the weapon, but he refused and advanced toward them with the ax raised over his head. "Fearing for their safety, the officers fired their weapons at the suspect and struck him," said authorities. |
| 2010-03-20 | Steven Washington (27) | California (Los Angeles) | Officers shot Washington early Saturday morning after he reached into his waistband for what they believed was a weapon. Washington died from a single gunshot wound to the head shortly after midnight. Although no weapon was found, officers said they feared for their lives because Washington did not respond to their commands and appeared to be reaching for his waistband. |
| 2010-03-20 | Alexander Epstein (19) | Florida (Clearwater) | |
| 2010-03-19 | Kenneth DeShields (37) | Pennsylvania (Philadelphia) | After Josey said he was an officer, DeShields tucked his own gun - a 9mm Smith & Wesson - into his waistband and ran. He had not gotten into the cash register and escaped with only some merchandise. Josey ran after, shouting, "Police, stop" and "Don't pull it out" when DeShields reached toward his waistband. DeShields' "aggressive movements" continued, according to the statement from prosecutors, and Josey fired six times. |
| 2010-03-19 | Albert Valencia (32) | California (Los Angeles) | Officers were called to a health club about 9 a.m. Patrons reported a man was acting strangely and threatening people, according to authorities. Upon arrival, officers attempted to stop Valencia, who was driving his car out of the parking lot. The officers reported that they saw Valencia brandish a knife as they approached him. Valencia stopped his vehicle and fled into a yard, where officers became involved in a "physical altercation" with him and used a Taser, according to the statement. Shortly afterward, Valencia became unresponsive, and officers performed CPR until the fire department arrived. He was taken to a local hospital and pronounced dead. |
| 2010-03-19 | Jonathan Rodriguez-Muñiz (21) | Wisconsin (Milwaukee) | Rodriguez-Muñiz was fatally shot by Milwaukee Police after he pointed a gun at them as they attempted to arrest him for outstanding warrants, according to the Milwaukee Police Department. Rodriguez-Muñiz ran from the house and officers pursued him on foot. At one point, Rodriguez-Muñiz fell and a gun fell from his person. He retrieved the gun and pointed it at officers. After refusing multiple commands from officers to drop the gun, and fearing for their safety and the safety of others in the area, the officers discharged their weapons fatally striking Rodriguez-Muñiz multiple times. |
| 2010-03-18 | Isaac Ornelas (30) | California (Los Angeles) | Isaac Ornelas, a 30-year-old Latino, died Thursday, March 18, the day after he was shot by police several times, according to Los Angeles County coroner's records. Officers had responded to a call for service at a residence. When officers arrived, they were directed to a detached structure at the back of the house where they encountered Ornelas armed with a semi-automatic handgun. When the suspect reached for his weapon, officers opened gunfire. Ornelas was struck in the upper torso and taken into custody. Los Angeles Fire Department personnel took Ornelas to a hospital where he died in surgery. |
| 2010-03-17 | Jonathan Skinner (20) | Tennessee (Gallatin) | Gallatin police say that Jonathan Skinner, 20, and David Christopher Cotton, 20, were suspects in a bank robbery in Gallatin. Police say Cotton entered the bank wearing a leprechaun outfit, and carrying a large-caliber weapon. After stealing money, Cotton joined Skinner in a getaway vehicle. After a chase with police, Cotton and Skinner ran and exchanged gunfire with officers. Police say Skinner was killed and Cotton committed suicide. |
| 2010-03-16 | Stanley Streeter (36) | New York (Staten Island) | Streeter was being transported from a facility where he was being psychiatrically hospitalized to Richmond University Medical Center for evaluation of elevated blood pressure. In transit, he unbuckled himself from his gurney, stepped out of the ambulance and was subdued by New York Police Department (NYPD) officers. One officer kept his knee on Streeter's lower back and another kept a knee on his neck for 30 minutes. His official cause of death was hypertensive cardiovascular disease and the NYPD took no disciplinary measures. A federal lawsuit was settled in 2016 for $1.5 million. |
| 2010-03-15 | Larry Edward Wall Jr. (30) | Georgia (Savannah-Chatham) | A Savannah-Chatham police officer fatally shot a man who authorities say had stabbed the patrolman with a knife. The officer was taken to an area hospital with wounds described as not life-threatening; the suspect, identified as Larry Edward Wall Jr., 30, died at the scene. |
| 2010-03-15 | Edward Frey (57) | Florida (Windsor) | |
| 2010-03-14 | Charles Allen Barrera (39) | California (Anaheim) | Anaheim police said Barrera was "highly agitated" and was using profanities before attacking an off-duty Gardena police officer at a Del Taco restaurant. Martinez said he didn't know what led to the attack, but the officer fired his weapon and shot the man outside the east entrance. The officer suffered a broken rib and had injuries to his nose, jaw and face resulting in some cuts and swelling. |
| 2010-03-14 | Gerald Black (51) | Texas (Dallas) | Two officers responded to a family violence call involving a gun in the 2800 block of Materhorn Drive. When officers entered the home they encountered Black, who attempted to grab one of the officer's weapons. The second officer discharged their patrol rifle, fatally striking Black. |
| 2010-03-12 | Reginald Dewayne Wallace (40) | Tennessee (Memphis) | A burglary suspect died after he was shot by a police officer who thought he had a weapon, Nashville police said. Officer Joe Shelton responded to a call about a home burglary and found the suspect fleeing the home. "Shelton saw him trying to go for something," he said. "He could see something was silver - not knowing what the suspect was about to do - fearing that the suspect was about to put him in imminent danger with some type weapon, Officer Shelton fired." Police said the man was unarmed, but he had a silver iPod that he allegedly stole from the home. |
| 2010-03-11 | Malcolm Shaw (43) | Tennessee (Memphis) | According to investigators, Bartlett police Det. Patrick Cici acted in self-defense when he shot Malcolm Shaw, 43. Bartlett police were serving a warrant at Shaw's home in North Memphis when he came from a back room of his home armed with a gun. Cici saw the gun fired once. Memphis police ruled the shooting as a justifiable homicide., |
| 2010-03-11 | Brenda Van Zweitan (56) | Florida (Pompano Beach) | Police were serving a drug raid on her home. After breaking into her home through a glass door and arresting her boyfriend, she was said to come out and point a gun at police, refuse orders to drop it, and she was then shot through the head. Despite there being no blood found in the kitchen the shooting occurring in her bedroom. |
| 2010-03-11 | Tyler Hayes (23) | Oklahoma (Oklahoma City) | Tyler Hayes, 23, an escaped fugitive from the Oklahoma Department of Corrections, was shot and killed March 11, 2010 in Oklahoma City after Officers pursued Hayes driving a stolen vehicle, police said. "The suspect failed to comply with those commands [to stop the vehicle], put the vehicle in reverse and violently spun that vehicle around in a 180. During this incident, both officers discharged their duty weapons," said Oklahoma City Police Capt. Patrick Stewart. |
| 2010-03-10 | Gaylon Alexander(31) | Texas (Dallas) | A relative said Alexander was high on drugs and had been randomly firing a gun at an apartment complex. Alexander stopped on Dryden, opened the SUV's door and fired at officers, police said. Police fired back, fatally injuring him. |
| 2010-03-07 | David Okot (26) | Maine (Portland) | Shot after brandishing handgun. Police were responding to report of intoxicated man with handgun. |
| 2010-03-07 | unnamed man | Georgia (Redan) | Shot after confronting officers with a knife. The man had broken into his own home using a brick at which point the babysitter called police. Officers twice attempted to subdue man with Taser. |
| 2010-03-07 | Joshua Wheeler (30) | Pennsylvania (Harrison Valley) | Police received a report of an intoxicated man walking around a neighborhood carrying an assault rifle. Police were dispatched to the scene and Mr. Wheeler barricaded himself in his residence. Attempts were made to resolve the situation peacefully by Troopers, family, friends, and a SERT negotiator with negative results. Mr. Wheeler indicated that the situation would end in bloodshed and him leaving in a body bag. After hours of negotiation Wheeler began firing rounds at Troopers. After further negotiations and rounds shot from the residence, one or more officers opened fire on Wheeler, fatally wounding Wheeler. |
| 2010-03-06 | Lloyd Long (33) | Ohio (Columbus) | Franklin Township police responded to a call about a theft from the Kohl's department store at 4050 W. Broad St. Police saw a man run out of Kohl's and get into a car driven by a 26-year-old woman. Police pursued the car into Columbus, where it stopped in front of 1366 Birch Dr., a dead end on the South Side. An officer approached the car, and Long got out. Jim Gilbert, president of Fraternal Order of Police Capital City Lodge No. 9, said the 6-foot-5-inch, 250-pound Long struck the officer and pulled out a gun. The officer fired in self-defense, Gilbert said. |
| 2010-03-05 | Alberta Brooks (40) | Louisiana (Shreveport) | Shreveport police say an officer shot and killed Alberta Brooks, 40, who attacked him with a screwdriver and was unaffected by a stun gun. Brooks' girlfriend had called early Friday to say he was causing problems and she wanted him out of their house. He says Brooks was gone when police arrived, but apparently forced the door open later. |
| 2010-03-04 | Michael Tanner (26) | Louisiana (Ouachita Parish) | Cpl. J.R. Searcy was a sheriff's deputy responding to a reported aggravated assault. He was attempting to handcuff suspect Tanner when Tanner pulled out a handgun from behind his back and shot Searcy. Another deputy shot and killed Tanner. Searcy died in the hospital a week later. |
| 2010-03-03 | Joseph Amaktoolik (38) | Alaska (Golovin) | Upon arriving at a residence where Amaktoolik was believed to be, Amaktoolik confronted the trooper at the door brandishing a firearm. The trooper fired upon Amaktoolik. Amaktoolik was fatally wounded. |

== See also ==
- Death in custody § United States
- Henry A. Wallace Police Crime Public Database
- List of cases of police brutality
- List of countries with annual rates and counts for killings by law enforcement officers
- List of law enforcement officers killed in the line of duty in the United States
- List of law enforcement officers convicted for an on-duty killing in the United States
- List of shootings by US immigration agents
- List of police reforms related to the George Floyd protests
- List of unarmed African Americans killed by law enforcement officers in the United States
- Lists of killings by law enforcement officers
- Police brutality in the United States
- Police misconduct § United States
- Police riot § United States
- Police use of deadly force in the United States
