= Lost River (Bering Sea) =

Coordinates: 65.38972°N 167.14556°W

Lost River (Inupiaq: Amaaqtulik) is a waterway on the Seward Peninsula of the U.S. state of Alaska. Rising in the York Mountains, the river empties into the Bering Sea, 10 miles (16 km) west of Port Clarence. It is located 10 miles (16 km) east of Cape York.

== Geography ==
Lost River has a length of about 10 miles (16 km), and drains the central part of the York Mountains. Its two tributaries, Tin Creek and Cassiterite Creek, enter from the east about 3 miles (4.8 km) and 1 mile (1.6 km), respectively, from its mouth, and tin ore has been found on both of these creeks. Cassiterite Creek, which is really the larger fork of Lost River, has a length of about 3 miles (4.8 km). Tin Creek, about 2 miles (3.2 km) long, heads within about 1 mile (1.6 km) of Cassiterite Creek, and, flowing parallel with it for about the same distance, turns westward and enters Lost River through a canyon cut in the limestones of the York Mountains. Lost River itself flows in a comparatively broad valley cut in these limestones. The bed of the river is not deeply gravel filled, and the valley floor is practically cut out of the limestones and not to any extent built on them. The mouth of Cassiterite Creek is about 100 feet (30 m) above the sea. Between Tin Creek aad Lost River, there is a stock of granite intruded into the limestone, which outcrops in a nearly circular area, probably 0.5 miles (0.80 km) in diameter.

== History ==
In 1898, a party of disappointed prospectors, returning from Kotzebue Sound, were shipwrecked a few miles east of the mouth of Lost River, and were obliged to camp at that point during the winter. A cabin built largely from wreckage of their schooner is known as the Kotzebue cabin. These prospectors probably first applied the name Lost River to this stream. In the succeeding summer a mining district was organized by survivors of this expedition, with headquarters located on King River, which enters Bering Sea between Lost River and Cape York. The Lost River region was included at that time in the King River recording district. No discoveries of gold were made, however, and the region was abandoned by prospectors. In the winter of 1902, prospectors again turned their attention to this region in the search for tin ore. Granite porphyry dikes, which occur in the limestones near the mouth of Lost River and also near King River, first attracted their attention, and many specimens of this were mistaken for "tin crystals," were sent to various assayers, from whom widely divergent reports were obtained. Early in the summer of 1903, Charles Randt, Leslie Crim, and Y. J. O'Brien discovered minerals in Tin Creek and made a thorough search for tin ore in that vicinity. They made a large collection of minerals, which was sent to Teller in July, 1903. Metallic tin was readily obtained from one small specimen by aid of a blowpipe, while the larger part of the collection was shown to contain minerals of no value. The collection was of sufficient interest to tempt an examination of the locality in detail where there was evidence of tin ore which had been seen in Teller to the granitic dike on Cassiterite Creek, and also to obtain specimens of stannite ore from Tin Creek. Since this examination the dike described has been called "Cassiterite ledge" in location notices, and it has been definitely traced through a group of four claims. A crosscut trench has been made near the Cassiterite Creek end of the ledge, which, it is reported, shows that the ledge has a width of 100 feet and that cassiterite is disseminated throughout the rock.
