= Salmon Lake (Alaska) =

Lake in the state of Alaska, United States

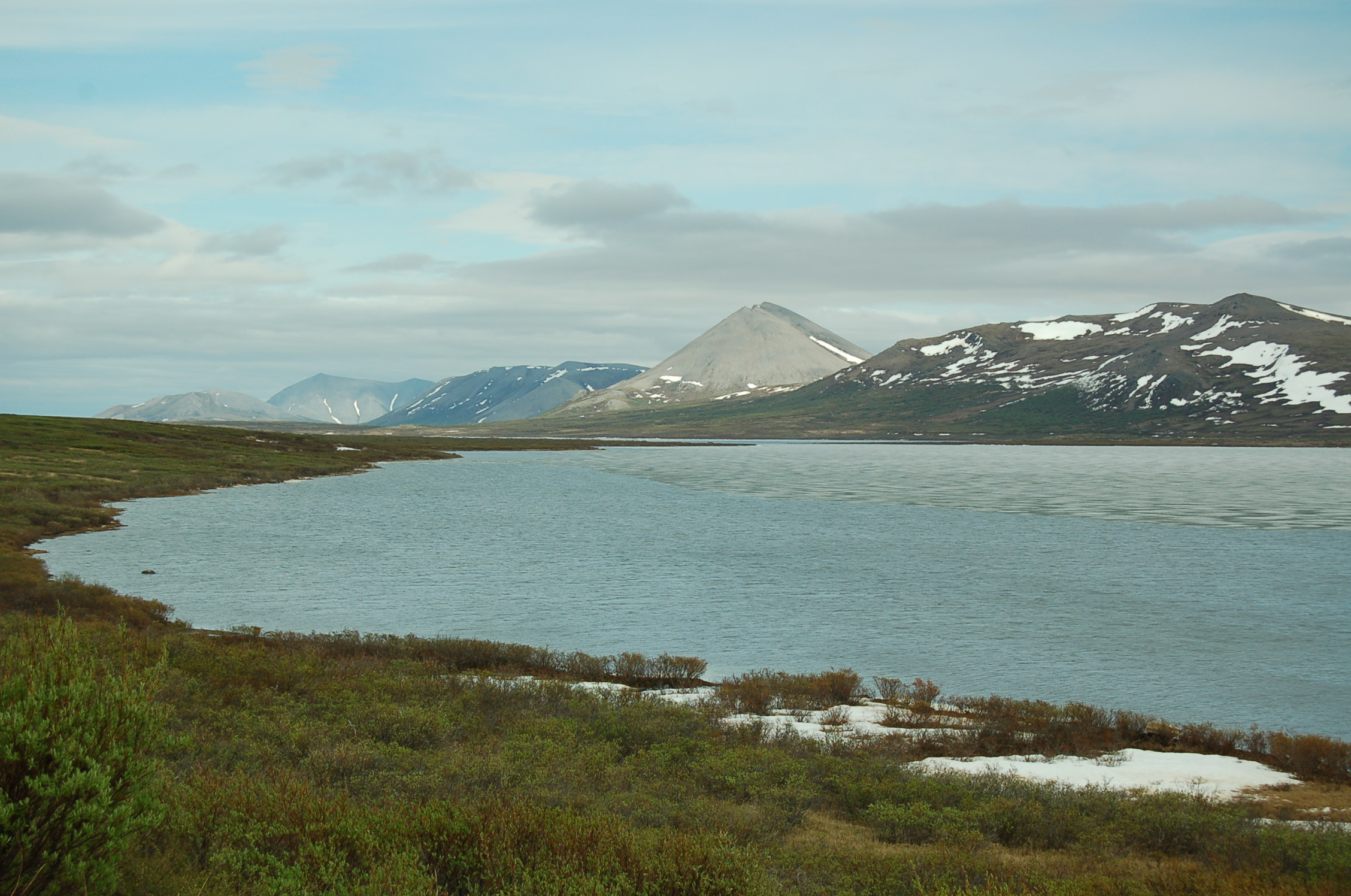

- Location within Alaska
- Location: Seward Peninsula, Alaska
- Coordinates: 64.90278°N 165.00861°W
- Type: lake
- Primary inflows: Grand Central River
- Primary outflows: Kruzgamepa River
- Surface area: 1,800 acres (730 ha)
- Surface elevation: 442 feet (135 m)

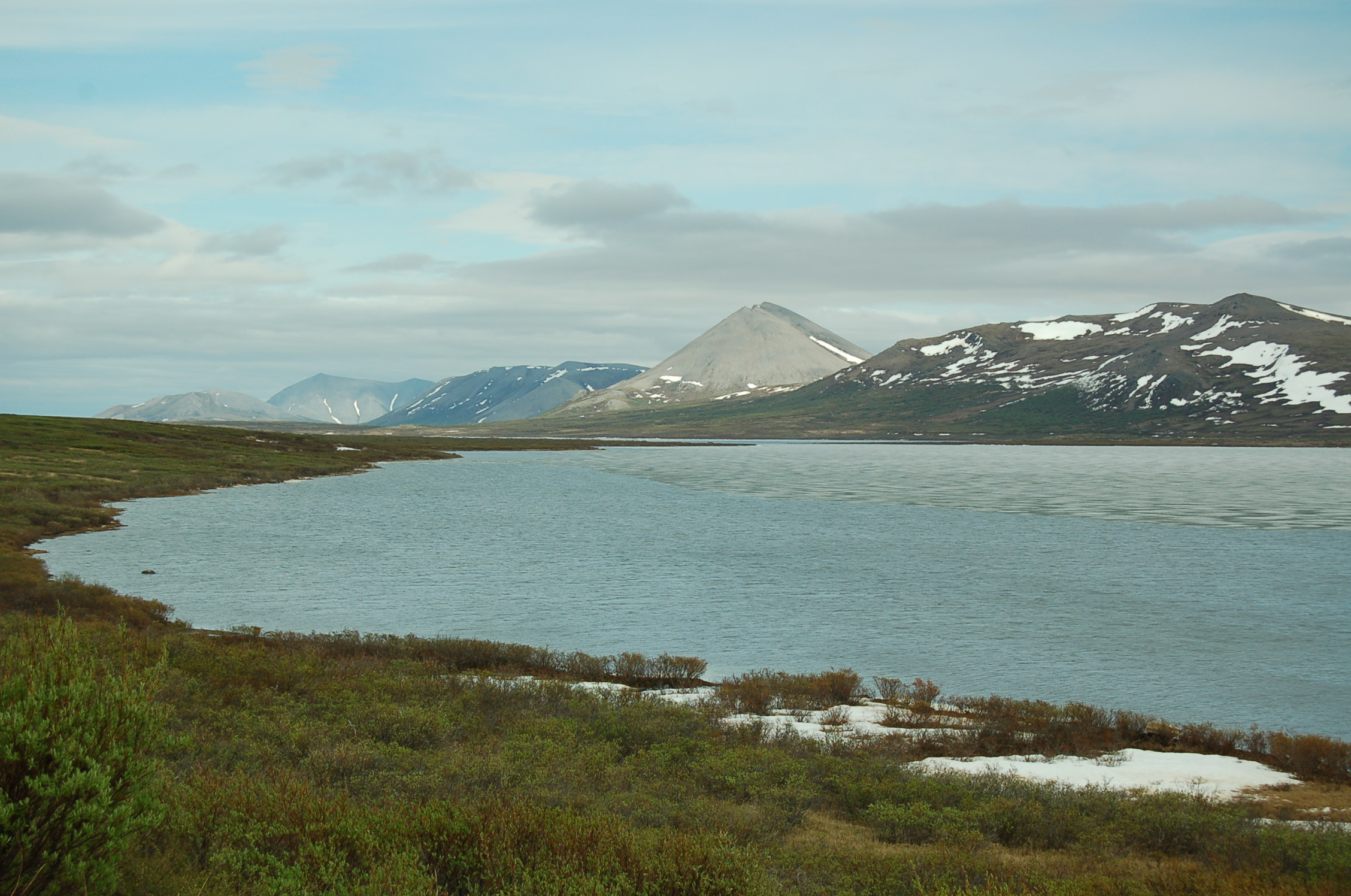
Salmon Lake in June 2006

Salmon Lake (native name, Nahwazuk, meaning "salmon") is a natural lake on the Seward Peninsula in the U.S. state of Alaska. Situated 35 miles (56 km) north of Cape Nome, it drains into Port Clarence through Kruzgamepa River. The lake lies at the foot of the Kigluaik Mountains at an elevation of about 442 feet (135 m). It has a water surface area of 1,800 acres (730 ha) and a drainage area of 81 square miles (210 km^{2}). Its principal supply comes from Grand Central River, which enters it at its western end. A number of small streams also enter the lake from both the north and the south; Fox Creek and Jasper Creek are the most notable of these. Efforts to dam the lake in order to provide power and water supply to mining endeavors occurred from 1906-1907, However these plans were later dropped due to disputes over land ownership and water rights.
