= Bendeleben Mountains =

Mountaim range in Alaska, United States

- Green Horn Mountain Range
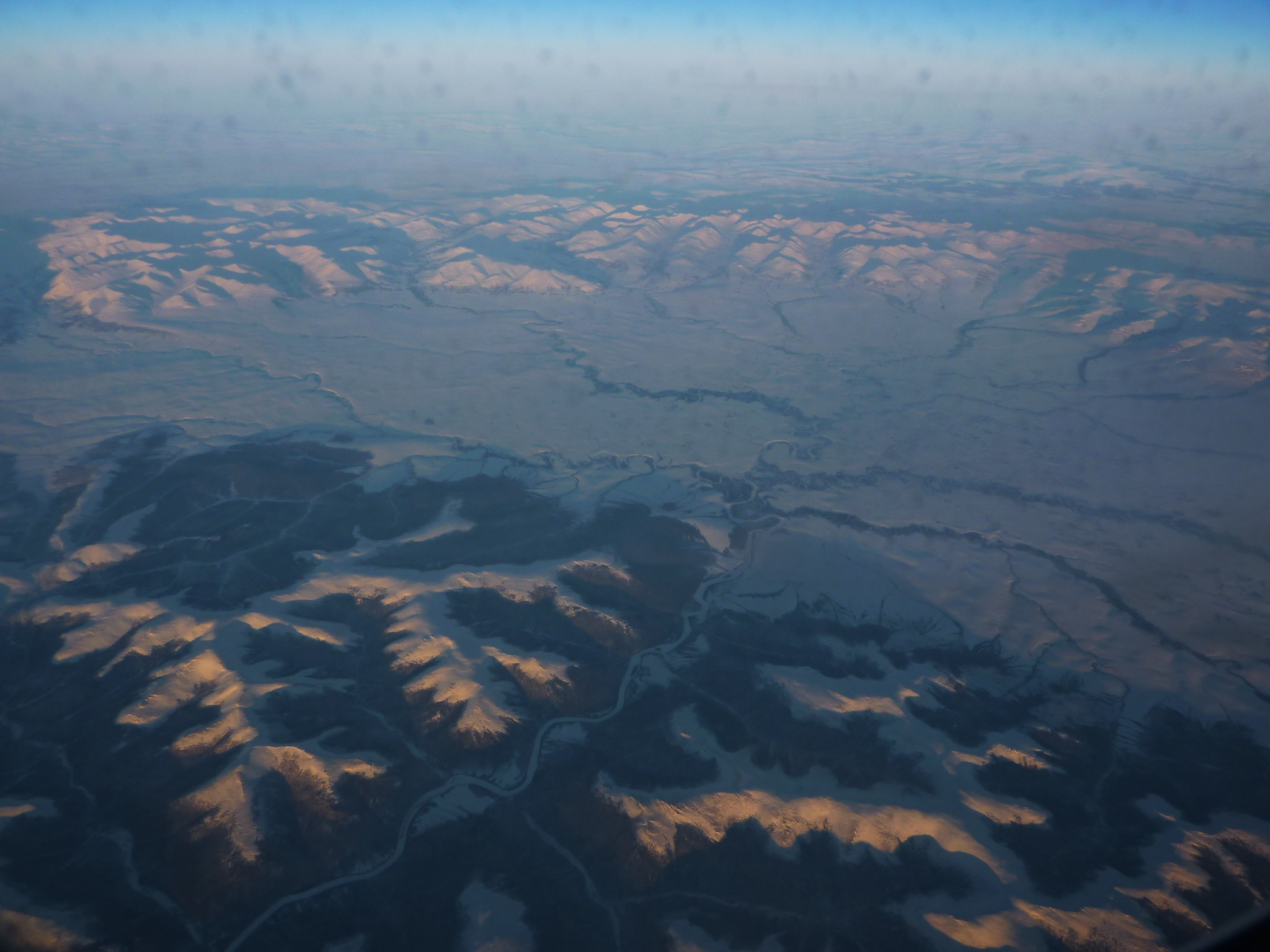

Highest point
- Elevation: 2,864 ft (873 m)
- Coordinates: 65°12′30″N 163°35′22″W

Geography

The Bendeleben (/ˈbɛn.dəˌleɪ.bɨn/) Mountains are a mountain range on the heart of the Seward Peninsula in Nome Census Area, Alaska, United States. This range forms a major divide between drainage basins draining into the Pacific Ocean and the Arctic Ocean. The tallest peak, Mount Bendeleben is 3,730 feet (1,140 m) at the summit, and is located on the west end. Bits of the range go into the Bering Land Bridge National Preserve, but most of the peaks remain unclaimed. The Tubutulik River flows in the area.

Mount Bendeleben is the highest point on the Seward Peninsula east of the Kigluaik Mountains. According to the geologists who studied contiguous areas in 1900, the metamorphic schists of the Bendeleben Mountains were considered distinct from the other schists of the region and were therefore given a name and assigned to a more or less definite stratigraphic position. In 1908, the senior writer of this report made a cross section of the range along the western margin of the area, and in 1909 the party had the opportunity of studying the section north and west. of Death Valley, where rocks previously considered as belonging to the Kigluaik group are exposed. About the head of the Fish River, the mountains are chiefly granitic, but along their flanks and sometimes extending through them in belts of varying breadth which mark the passes are areas of schistose sediments. Similar to the Kigluaik Mountains, the Bendeleban Mountains are rugged, with sharply cut valleys, and many glacial cirques.

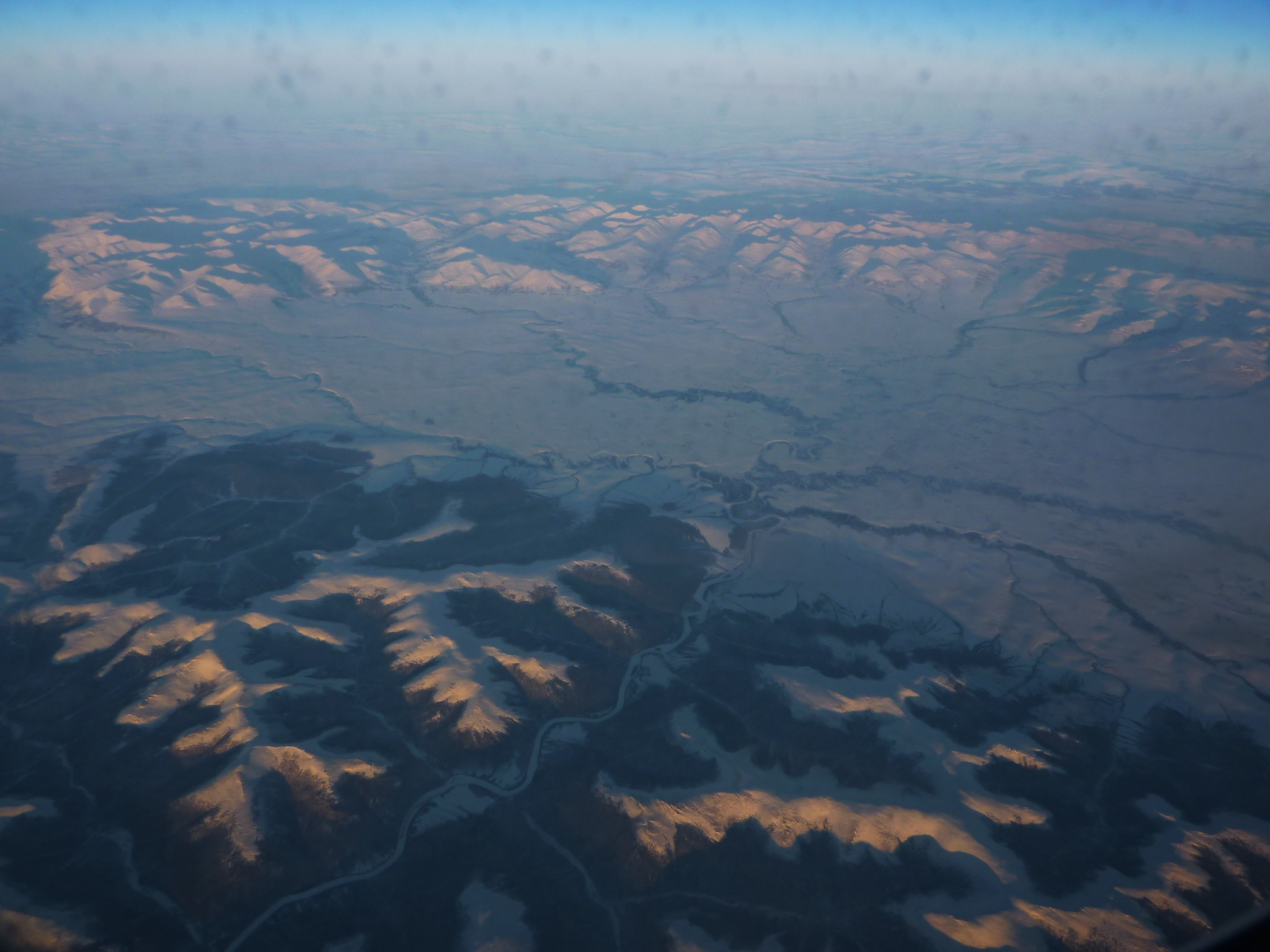
Bendeleben Mountains (in the background) seen from the south

== Flora ==
On the southern side of the Bendeleben Mountains, scattered spruce trees are reported in the valley of the Niukluk River as far west as Libby River, which rises on the west side of Mount Bendeleben. Eastward, spruce grows along all the streams. On the northern side of the Bendeleben Mountains, spruce is found in the valley of the Koyuk River, west to the vicinity of Timber Creek on the south, and to the tributaries heading toward Kiwalik Mountain on the north. Spruce extends considerably farther west on the south side of the Bendeleben Mountains than it does on the north.
