= Kruzgamepa River =

Kruzgamepa River (Pilgrim River)
- Location of the mouth of the Kruzgamepa River in Alaska

Location
- Country: United States
- State: Alaska
- District: Nome Census Area

Physical characteristics
- Source: Salmon Lake
  - location: southeast of the Kigluaik Mountains, Seward Peninsula
  - coordinates: 64°55′00″N 164°57′30″W
  - elevation: 447 ft (136 m)
- Mouth: Kuzitrin River
  - location: 34 miles (55 km) east-southeast of Teller
  - coordinates: 65°09′21″N 165°13′21″W
  - elevation: 20 ft (6.1 m)
- Length: 55 mi (89 km)

The Kruzgamepa River (or Pilgrim River) is a 55-mile (89 km) tributary of the Kuzitrin River on the Seward Peninsula in the U.S. state of Alaska. The river begins at Salmon Lake, elevation 447 feet (136 m), and descends to 20 feet (6.1 m) above sea level at its mouth. In turn, the Kuzitrin River empties into the Imuruk Basin. The basin drains via the bay of Port Clarence to the Bering Sea.

In the upper reaches of the watershed, the Kruzgamepa and Grand Central rivers form one stream but are known by different names, and their physical features vary somewhat. The Grand Central flows into Salmon Lake while the Kruzgamepa flows out.

== Geography ==
Salmon Lake, the source of the river, lies in a broad valley at the southern base of the Kigluaik Mountains. The Kruzgamepa flows to the northeast and, sweeping around the east end of the range, reaches the head of Imuruk Basin by a northwesterly course. The drainage basin of the upper Kruzgamepa was first organized as the Golden Gate mining district, and is now included in the Kougarok mining district. Kruzgamepa flows in a broad gravel-filled valley. Above the mouth of Iron Creek broad gravel terraces occur on both sides of the stream about 50 feet (15 m) above the water. Much of the gravel was contributed by glaciers that flowed from the Kigluaik Mountains.

== History ==
What little prospecting has been done has not led to encouraging results. Iron Creek, the largest eastern tributary of the Kruzgamepa, is the most important from the standpoint of mining. Willow Creek, which is about 3 miles (5 km) long, joins the Kruzgamepa from the south about 8 miles (13 km) above Iron Creek. Near its mouth, this stream flows through a small rock canyon about 50 feet (15 m) deep, above which is a bench on either side covered with gravel. This bench represents an old valley floor into which the stream has cut its present valley. The bed rock consists of limestones with interbedded quartz schists of sedimentary origin and with intruded greenstones. The strikes are almost directly across the course of the stream and the dips upstream. Slate Creek, which is about 2 miles (3 km) long, joins the Kruzgamepa from the south 2 miles (3 km) above Willow Creek. The character of the bed rock is the same as that of Willow Creek. Both of these creeks have been worked to some extent every season since 1901, and some gold has been produced. A high gravel bench on the east side of the Kruzgamepa, between Slate and Willow creeks, was prospected in 1904 by a company proposing to bring water for hydraulicking from Salmon Lake.

== See also ==
- List of rivers of Alaska
