= Fish River (Alaska) =

River in Alaska, United States

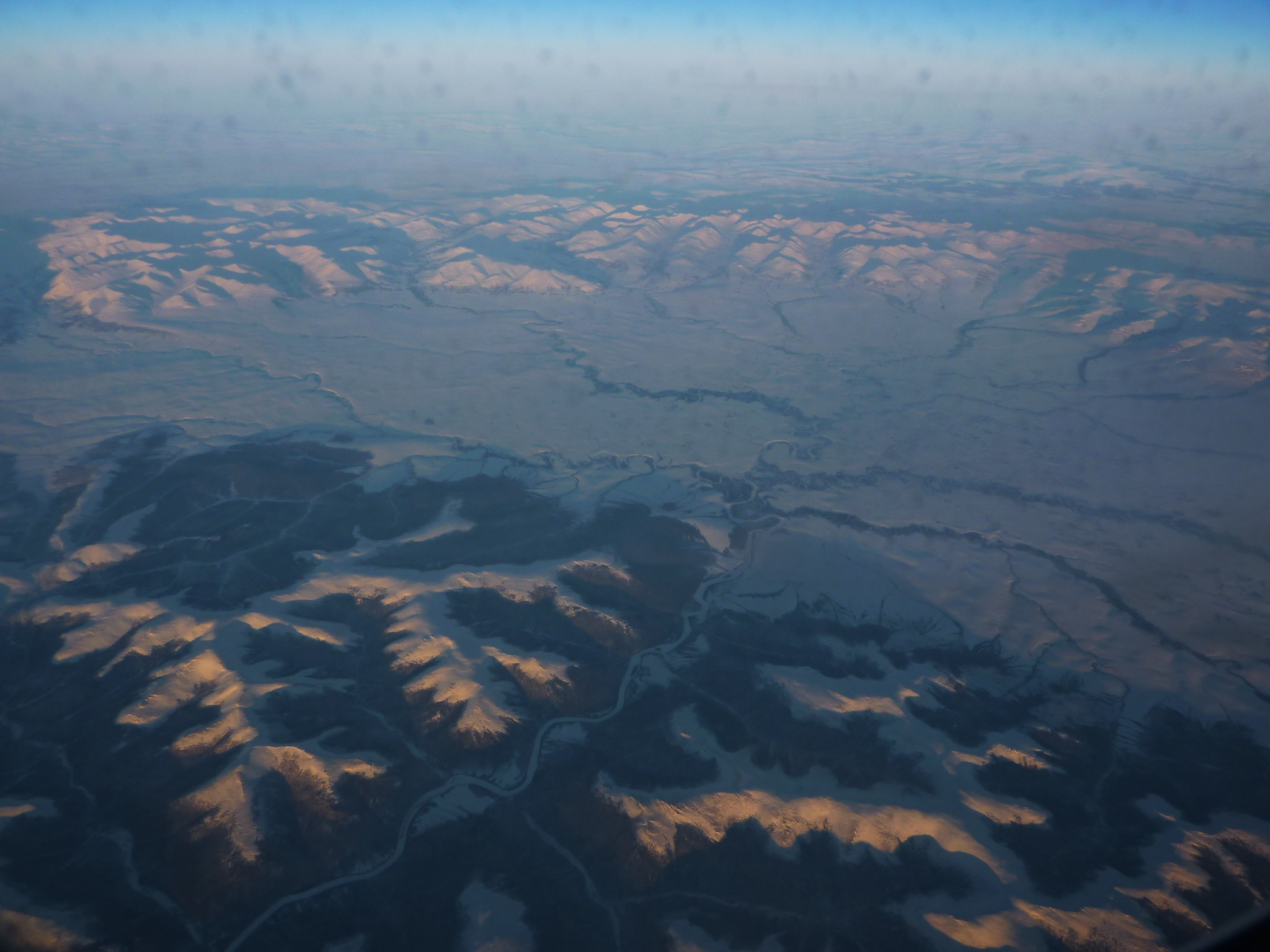
- River basin east of Nome

- Location of the mouth of the Fish River in Alaska
- Etymology: Eskimo–Aleut languages
- Native name: Ikalikhvik (Inupiaq)

Location
- Country: United States
- State: Alaska
- Region: Nome Census Area

Physical characteristics
- Source: Bendeleben Mountains
  - coordinates: 65°19′00″N 163°05′32″W
  - elevation: 2,384 ft (727 m)
- Mouth: Golovnin Bay
  - location: 35 miles (56 km) east of Solomon
  - coordinates: 64°55′10″N 163°21′00″W
  - elevation: 0 ft (0 m)
- Length: 47 mi (76 km)

The Fish River (Iġalugvik in Inupiaq) is a waterway in the U.S. state of Alaska. The 47-mile-long (76 km) river rises in the Bendeleben Mountains and flows south to Golovnin Lagoon, before emptying into Golovnin Bay, Norton Sound, and the Bering Sea. The basin formed by the Fish River is known for its placer gold deposits, and in particular, the Niukluk River and its tributaries; production from this tributary valley is reported to be more than from any other place in the region. A galena mine existed 40 miles (64 km) from the sea, worked on occasion by a San Francisco corporation with a few hundred tons of ore taken to the city for smelting and refining for silver. Walter Curran Mendenhall found obscure fossils on Fish River at White Mountain.

== Etymology ==
Its Inuit name was reported in 1838 as Ikalikhvik meaning "fish (or fish place)" by Aleksandr Kashevarov. Various spellings were reported by Western Union Telegraph Expedition in 1865–67. Dall appears to be the first to have applied the name "Fish River" in 1870 when he wrote: "Golofnina Bay is connected with a large lagoon which opens in Grantley Harbor by the extremely winding channel of the Fish River, which has one principal tributary, the Kavi-ava-zak." Dall's application heads the Fish River on what is now the Niukluk River.

== Geography ==
Fish River is one of the streams emanating from the northern part of the Bendeleben Mountains, along with others such as Tubutulik River. The area is accessible from Nome via a small airstrip at White Mountain.

The catchment area of the river is about 2,000 square miles (5,200 km^{2}). It is bounded by Golovnin Sound to its south, by the Kruzgamepa River to its west and the mountain range to its north (starting with Cape Darby in an arc from). It has many tributaries that rise at low elevations, and most of them are of equal length and have almost equal flow rates. The northwest of the river basin is bounded by the hills, which rise to a height of about 3,000 feet (910 m). Two stream originate from here, flow in torrents for some initial reach in the hills and then enters into flatter terrain where the river meanders forming sandbars. All the streams join in the gorge section itself before entering flatter terrain. It is met by the Niukluk River, and then flows for considerable distance in loops and forms the headwaters of the delta of Golovnin Sound. The delta extends over a width of 5 to 6 miles (8 to 10 km) and touches the foot of the White Mountain, a low mountain of about 200 feet (61 m) in height dominated by limestone formations. The delta is bisected by two channels, interspersed with sloughs, marshes, and ponds. Both channels are navigable; the west channel is larger and suitable for river craft and small boats to ply and the east channel is also navigable and suitable for plying light river craft.

== Geology ==
Granite formations are recorded in the head reaches of the river with schistose sediment intrusions. Bluffs of slates are also noted in certain stretches of the river valley. White coarse crystalline marble was reported in the area marked by two branches of the fish river, which are noted between intrusions of granites. The gorge section of the river has schist and limestone geological formations.

In the Nome group of Seaward Peninsula, geological formations of schist and limestone have also been recorded. Their age is conjectured as of Cambrian to Post Ordovician. The magnesium limestone formation in the White Mountain of the Fish River Basin is reported to contain fossil fauna in the form of a "heavy-shelled lamilibranch". This fossil has been compared with similar finds in south eastern Alaska in the limestone formations of similar age in the Glacier Bay and Freshwater Bay.

== Wildlife ==
Fish River is also known for its rich stock of fishing resources which attracted establishing of a number of fishing camps. The fish species reported from the river are: Chum salmon, silver salmon, pink salmon, Chinook salmon. red salmon, burbot, Northern pike, Dolly Varden, Arctic grayling, and whitefish.

Bald eagles are reported to nest at the confluence of this river with Niukluk River.

== Mining ==
In the Fish River valley, its longest tributary, Niukluk, has produced more gold than the rest of the region. This region was named the Council district. The river was reported initially to carry gold from its mouth to the northern periphery of the gorge. In the lower stretch of river water color was very light but got concentrated and heavier towards the constricted part of the valley. Here, limestone and schists belts are recorded as crossing the stream. The deposits are noted from the mouth of the river extending into the gorge section in the north. However, no gold was found in the upper lava plateau region of the river. The northern and eastern parts of the basin have the geological formations of schists (with biotite) and limestones similar to the type found in the Placer region. In the Council district area, placer gold was explored and in 1898 mining was organized in the distrait and the production was substantial and placed second to that produced at Nome.

Silver found in the upper regions of the Fish River was extracted at the Omalik Mine. Apart from silver a small amount of lead found was also extracted at this mine as early as 1881.

== See also ==
- List of rivers of Alaska
