= Mount Osborn =

Mountain in Alaska, United States

- Location within Alaska

Highest point
- Elevation: 4,714 ft (1,437 m)
- Listing: North America isolated peaks 40th
- Coordinates: 64°59′32″N 165°19′45″W

Geography
- Location: Seward Peninsula, Alaska, U.S.
- Parent range: Kigluaik Mountains
- Topo map: USGS Nome D-1

Mount Osborn is the highest point in the Kigluaik Mountains, and also on the Seward Peninsula. It is approximately 4714 feet high and is located on the north end of the range. Despite being almost one thousand feet taller, Osborn's fame is matched by Mount Bendeleben (located east of the Kigluaiks) because Bendeleben is much taller than any of the peaks in its territory.

== See also ==
- List of mountain peaks of North America
  - List of mountain peaks of the United States
    - List of mountain peaks of Alaska
