= Freshwater Bay (Alaska) =

Inlet in Alaska, United States

Coordinates: 57.89639°N 135.08167°W

Freshwater Bay (previously, Novaia and New harbor) is an inlet in the U.S. state of Alaska. It is situated on the eastern shore of Chichagof Island, Chatham Strait, in the Alexander Archipelago. Overlying rocks of cherty limestones of Silurian age stand nearly vertically and are over 1,000 feet (300 m) thick. On the northeast side of the bay, a thick series of melaphyre lava flows and tuffs are interstratified with limestone of Upper Devonian age.
