= Mount Bendeleben =

Mountain in Alaska, United States

- Location within Alaska

Highest point
- Elevation: 3,730 ft (1,140 m)
- Coordinates: 65°10′30″N 164°05′35″W

Geography
- Location: Seward Peninsula, Alaska, U.S.
- Parent range: Bendeleben Mountains
- Topo map: USGS Bendeleben A-5

Mount Bendeleben (Iñupiaq: Aniyaayuq) is the highest peak in the Bendeleben Mountains of the Seward Peninsula in Nome Census Area, Alaska, United States. It is located on the western end of the range, 37 mi (60 km) southwest of Imuruk Lake.

The mountain was named in 1866 by members of the Western Union Telegraph exploring expedition for the leader of the expedition, Baron Otto von Bendeleben. A. H. Brooks, USGS, reported in 1921 the native name as "Ahneyiyuk," meaning "looks like a big one."

On a clear day, Bendeleben overshadows all the other mountains in its region. It is renowned despite not being the tallest peak on the peninsula.
