= York Mountains =

Mountains on the Seward Peninsula, Alaska, U.S.

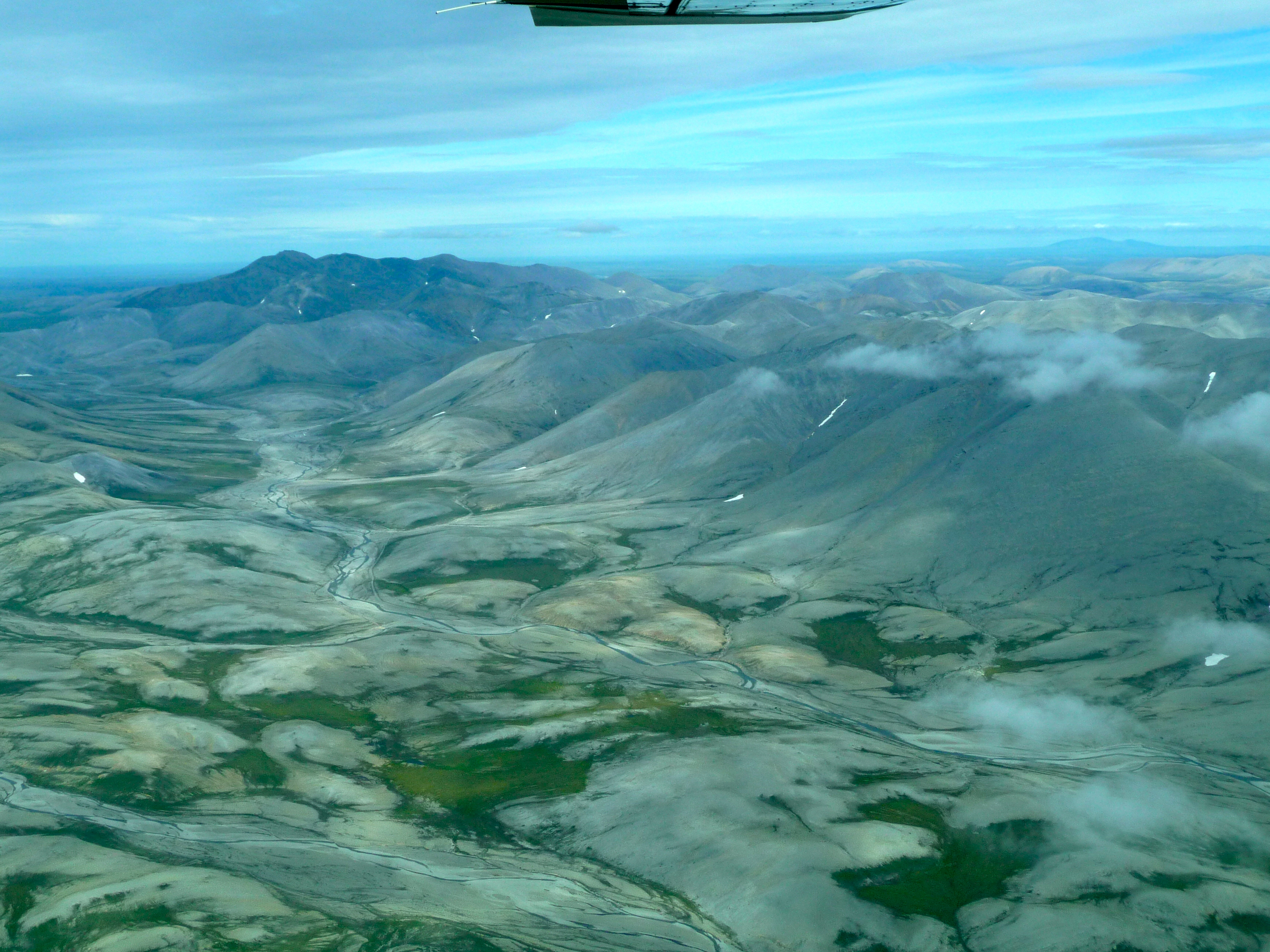

Highest point
- Elevation: 1,887 feet (575 m)
- Coordinates: 65°29′40″N 167°14′16″W, 65°30′35″N 167°17′33″W, 65°30′47″N 167°30′13″W

Geography
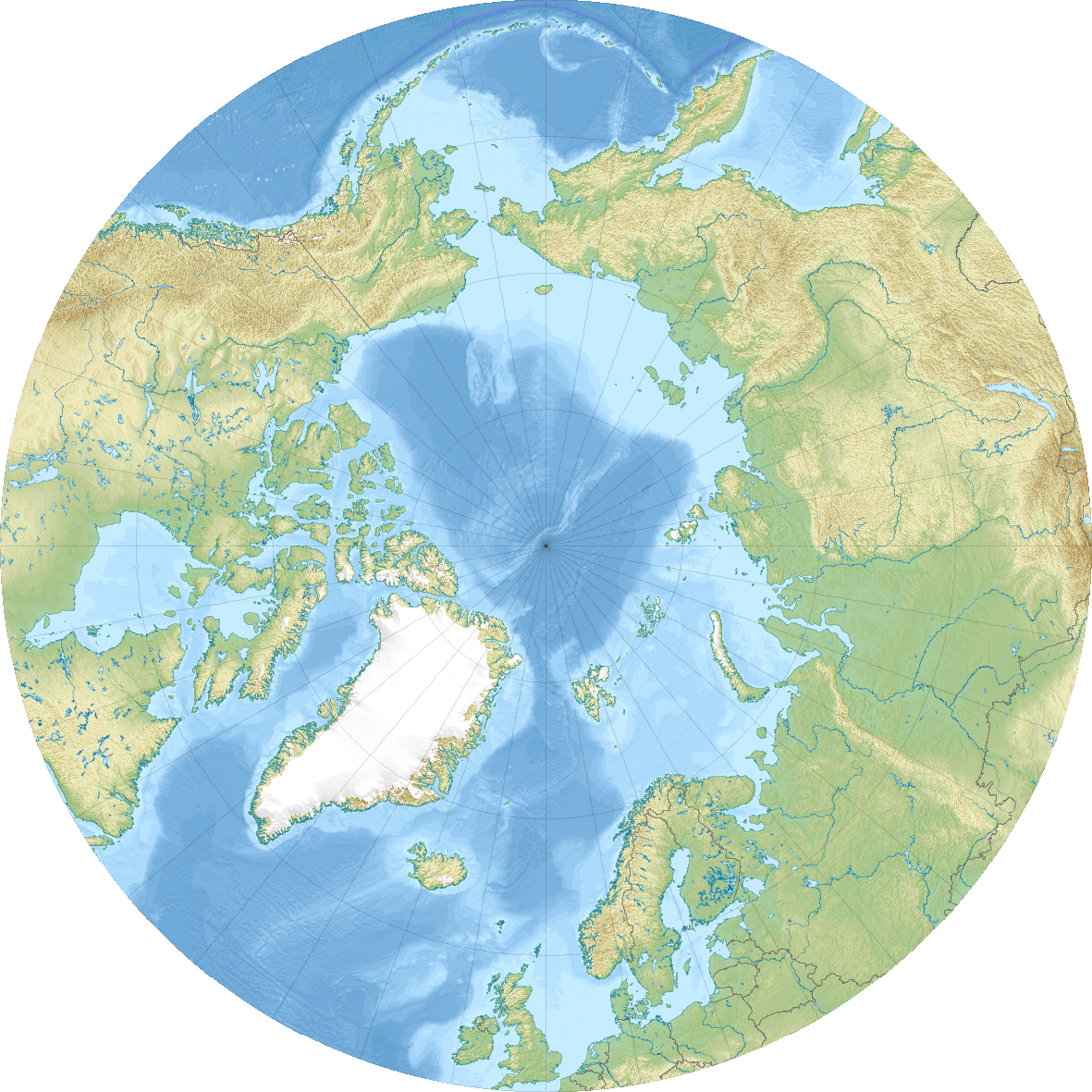
- Location within Alaska Location within Arctic
- Location: Nome Census Area, Alaska, U.S.
- Topo map(s): USGS Teller B-5 NE, Teller C-5 SW, Teller C-6 SE

York Mountains are located on the Seward Peninsula in the U.S. state of Alaska. They extend inland from the Bering Sea to the rocky cape of the same name. On the seaward sides, the streams have incised canyon-like valleys. Eastward, the York Mountains are extended by the highlands lying north of Port Clarence. Their western flanks fall off rather abruptly to the York PIateau. The general aspect of these mountains is rugged. The York Mountains and several other highland masses form isolated groups in the northern half of the peninsula, while in the southern half of the peninsula, the Kigluaik, Bendeleben, and Darby mountains form a broken range along a crescentic axis.
