= Niukluk River =

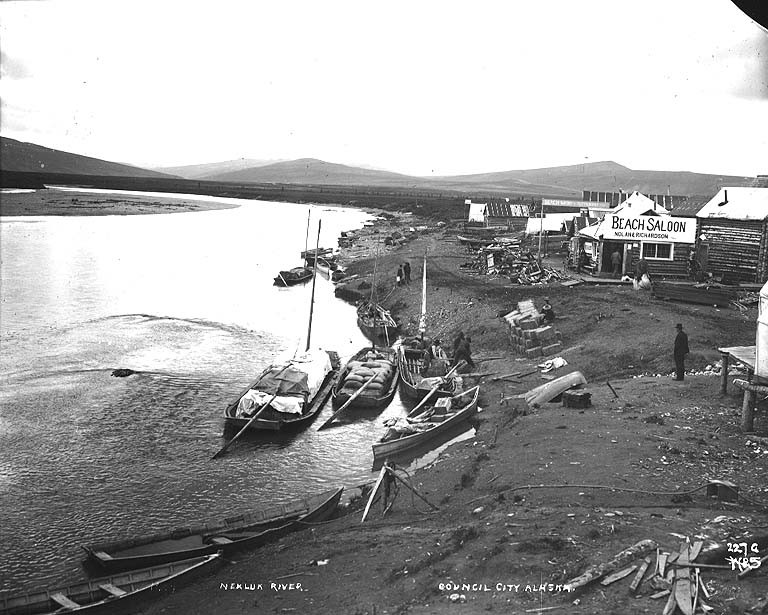

- Location of the mouth of the Niukluk River in Alaska

Location
- Country: United States
- State: Alaska
- District: Nome Census Area

Physical characteristics
- Source: Bendeleben Mountains of the Seward Peninsula
  - location: 5 miles (8 km) northeast of Mount Bendeleben
  - coordinates: 65°13′43″N 163°50′54″W
  - elevation: 2,780 ft (850 m)
- Mouth: Fish River
  - location: 34 miles (55 km) northeast of Solomon
  - coordinates: 65°13′43″N 163°50′54″W
- Length: 52 mi (84 km)
- Basin size: 707 sq mi (1,830 km^{2}) at Council, Alaska
- Discharge
  - location: Council, Alaska
  - maximum: 16,000 cu ft/s (450 m^{3}/s)

Niukluk River is a waterway in the U.S. state of Alaska. It rises in the Bendeleben Mountains and, after flowing across a broad valley lowland for about 15 miles (24 km), enters a narrower valley, in which it flows for about 20 miles (32 km). Below the mouth of Melsing Creek, the valley broadens out and merges with that of Fish River, to which the Niukluk is a tributary. It receives many tributaries, of which the Koksuktapaga, joining it from the south, is the largest. In Niukluk River itself, gold was found at its head, though most abundant below the mouth of American Creek. Just below the mouth of Ophir Creek, a little gold has been rocked out on the bars. The broad gravel flood plain in this part of the basin is said to be auriferous. Below the mouth of Ophir Creek the river has cut a small rock canyon 50 feet (15 m) below an old valley floor, leaving broad benches on either side. These benches are sheeted over by a few feet of gravel.

== See also ==
- List of rivers of Alaska
