= Shale Mountain =

Mountain in the state of Wyoming

- Location within Wyoming Location within the United States

Highest point
- Elevation: 12,405 ft (3,781 m)
- Prominence: 319 ft (97 m)
- Coordinates: 43°22′29″N 109°42′28″W

Geography
- Location: Sublette and Fremont Counties, Wyoming, U.S.
- Parent range: Wind River Range
- Topo map: USGS Downs Mountain

Climbing
- Easiest route: Hike

Shale Mountain (12,405 ft (3,781 m)) is located in the northern Wind River Range in the U.S. state of Wyoming. Shale Mountain straddles the Continental Divide and is in both Bridger-Teton and Shoshone National Forests. Shale Mountain is 5 mi (8.0 km) north of Downs Mountain.

== Hazards ==
Encountering bears is a concern in the Wind River Range. There are other concerns as well, including bugs, wildfires, adverse snow conditions and nighttime cold temperatures.

Importantly, there have been notable incidents, including accidental deaths, due to falls from steep cliffs (a misstep could be fatal in this class 4/5 terrain) and due to falling rocks, over the years, including 1993, 2007 (involving an experienced NOLS leader), 2015 and 2018. Other incidents include a seriously injured backpacker being airlifted near SquareTop Mountain in 2005, and a fatal hiker incident (from an apparent accidental fall) in 2006 that involved state search and rescue. The U.S. Forest Service does not offer updated aggregated records on the official number of fatalities in the Wind River Range.

== Climate ==
Climate data for Shale Mountain 43.3761 N, 109.7102 W, Elevation: 12,267 ft (3,739 m) (1991–2020 normals)
Month	Jan	Feb	Mar	Apr	May	Jun	Jul	Aug	Sep	Oct	Nov	Dec	Year
Mean daily maximum °F (°C)	19.1 (−7.2)	18.7 (−7.4)	23.9 (−4.5)	29.8 (−1.2)	38.7 (3.7)	49.0 (9.4)	58.8 (14.9)	57.8 (14.3)	48.9 (9.4)	36.3 (2.4)	24.7 (−4.1)	18.4 (−7.6)	35.3 (1.8)
Daily mean °F (°C)	9.5 (−12.5)	8.2 (−13.2)	12.8 (−10.7)	17.8 (−7.9)	26.6 (−3.0)	36.1 (2.3)	45.0 (7.2)	44.1 (6.7)	35.9 (2.2)	24.9 (−3.9)	15.2 (−9.3)	9.1 (−12.7)	23.8 (−4.6)
Mean daily minimum °F (°C)	−0.2 (−17.9)	−2.3 (−19.1)	1.7 (−16.8)	5.8 (−14.6)	14.4 (−9.8)	23.2 (−4.9)	31.2 (−0.4)	30.4 (−0.9)	22.9 (−5.1)	13.5 (−10.3)	5.7 (−14.6)	−0.2 (−17.9)	12.2 (−11.0)
Average precipitation inches (mm)	3.23 (82)	3.25 (83)	4.00 (102)	5.20 (132)	4.58 (116)	2.95 (75)	1.89 (48)	1.91 (49)	2.70 (69)	3.25 (83)	3.40 (86)	3.26 (83)	39.62 (1,008)
Source: PRISM Climate Group
