= Council, Alaska =

Abandoned townsite in Alaska, USA

Council (Inupiaq: Kaułiq or Akauchak) is a townsite in the Nome Census Area in the U.S. state of Alaska. It has a population of zero as of the 2000 and 2010 U.S. Censuses.

== Geography ==
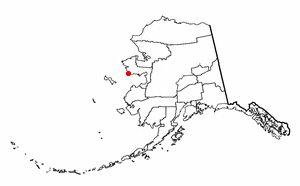
Location of Nome, Alaska

Council is located at about 64°53′42″N 163°40′35″W, about 57 miles east by northeast of Nome. It is located on the banks of the Niukluk River on the central Seward Peninsula.

== History ==
Council is the ancestral homelands of Ayasaaġiaġmiut, Iġałuiŋmiut, Iġniqtaġmiut, and Qawiaraġmiut--Iñupiat peoples who originate around the Niukluk River, a tributary of Fish River, and surrounding areas in the Seward Peninsula region. Council is a portion of the Tribe’s traditional territory, where Inupiaq lifeways included sites for villages, homes, camps, fishing, hunting, gathering, graves, and seasonal homes as people migrated with the fish and animals.

Descendants remained rooted around the Niukluk River and neighboring areas throughout the 1800s while settlers came to the region. In 1897, gold discovery resulted in a rush of mining prospectors. From 1897 to 1899, "Council City" was built near where Ophir Creek joins the Niukluk. During the next decade, Council and the surrounding area was home to a mixed population of Inupiat peoples, their kin from neighboring Fish River families, and settlers. The population was estimated to be anywhere from 4,000 to 15,000. Council City had modern facilities such as lodging, a post office, and a twenty-bed hospital. In 2004 the town's telephone lines, which had not been used since a brief period of re-habitation in the 1970s, were removed by the utility. The utility poles remain in place, with wires connecting to a defunct power plant from the same period.

Today, Council is a fish camp and important cultural site to the descendants of the area's Indigenous peoples. It has about 25 remaining buildings and much old mining equipment, including a dredge. A second, larger, dredge is located at 15 Mile Camp on Ophir Creek. There are several mine buildings on the site, including a powerhouse with a moderate diameter Pelton (undershot) waterwheel. A number of new buildings have been added in recent years, mostly for summer second-home usage. During the summer, Council is a camp for residents of Nome and White Mountain. Occasionally one or two people winter at Council.

Council is connected to Nome by a 75-mile gravel road, the Nome–Council Highway. The road is closed during winter. Council Native Corporation is the tribally-owned village corporation with rights to surface resources such as trees.

== Demographics ==
Historical population
| Census | Pop. | Note | %± |
|---|---|---|---|
| 1910 | 289 | | — |
| 1920 | 109 | | −62.3% |
| 1940 | 48 | | — |
| 1950 | 41 | | −14.6% |
| 1990 | 8 | | — |
| 2000 | 0 | | −100.0% |
| 2010 | 0 | | — |
U.S. Decennial Census

Council first appeared on the 1910 U.S. Census as Council City, although it was an unincorporated village. In 1920, the name was shortened to Council. It did not appear on the 1930 census, but returned again in 1940 and 1950. It did not appear again until 1990 when it was classified an Alaska Native Village Statistical Area (ANVSA). It has reported a population of zero in 2000 and 2010.
