= Golovnin Bay =

Waterway in the U.S. state of Alaska

Coordinates: 64.41556°N 162.95917°W

Golovnin Bay (Tasiq in Inupiaq) is a waterway in the U.S. state of Alaska. It is a part of Norton Sound. It is named in honor of Vasily Golovnin. Fish River empties into the bay. Situated on the Seward Peninsula, it is the only protected waterway south of Port Clarence.
