= Kigluaik Mountains =

Mountaim chain in Alaska, United States

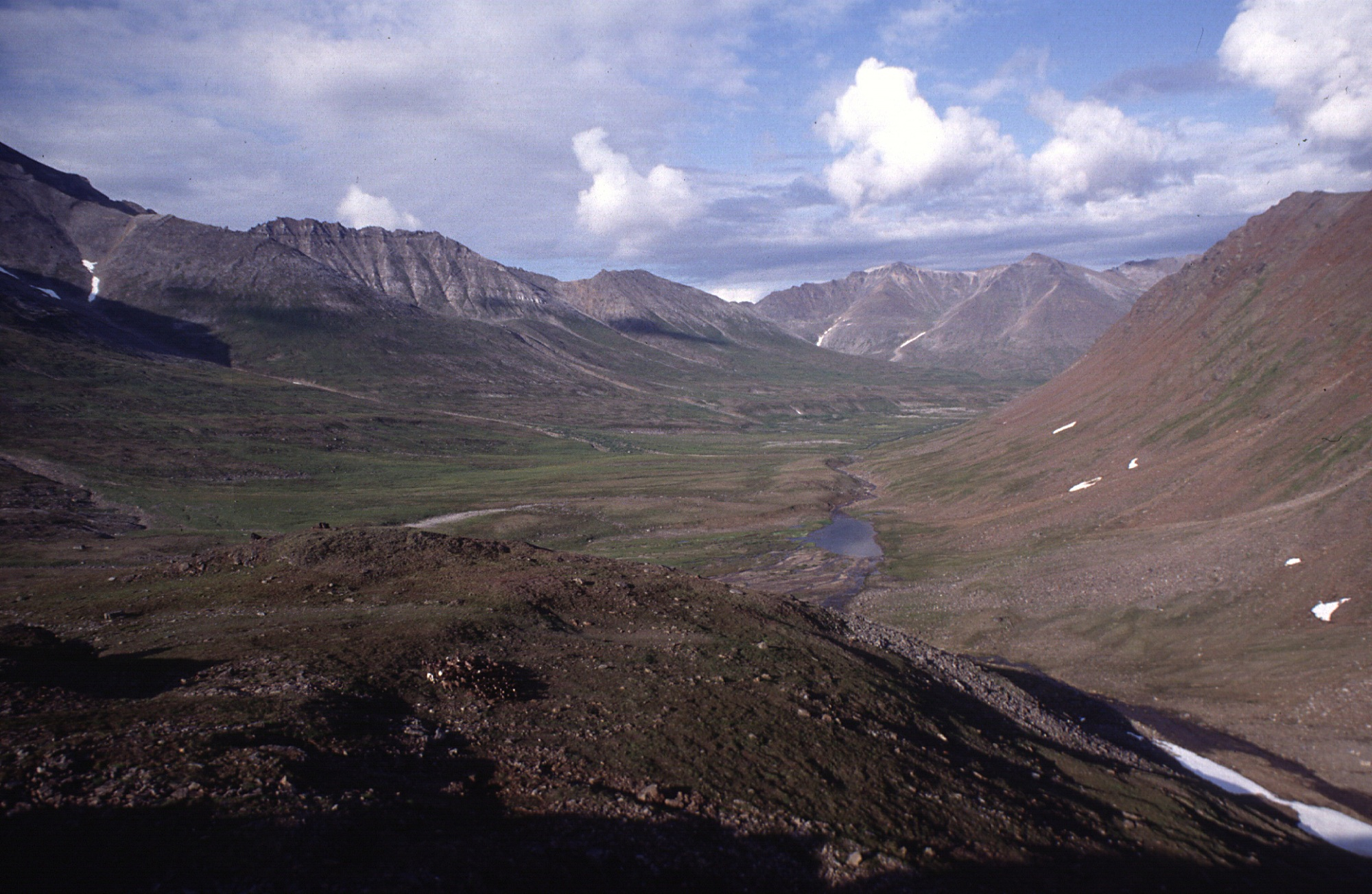
- Grand Central Valley, Kigluaik Mountains

Highest point
- Peak: Mount Osborn
- Elevation: 4,714 ft (1,437 m)
- Coordinates: 64°59′32″N 165°19′45″W

Naming
- Native name: Kiglawait (Inupiaq)

Geography
- Location within Alaska
- Country: United States
- State: Alaska
- Subdivision: Seward Peninsula
- Range coordinates: 64°58′35″N 165°21′44″W

The Kigluaik Mountains (Kiglawait in Inupiaq) are a 42-mile (68 km) mountain chain running east to west on western Alaska's Seward Peninsula.

Its highest point is the summit of Mount Osborn, at 4,714 feet (1,437 meters) above sea level. This remote range is home to numerous isolated mountain lakes which have been shown to contain unique subspecies of Arctic char. Located in the Nome Census Area, Kigluaik Mountains are noted as the location of Grand Union Glacier, the only remaining active glacier in western Alaska.

A view of the northern slope of the Kigluaik Mountains. This photo was taken in June 2006.
