= Seward Peninsula =

Peninsula on the western coast of Alaska

Coordinates: 65°20′N 164°15′W

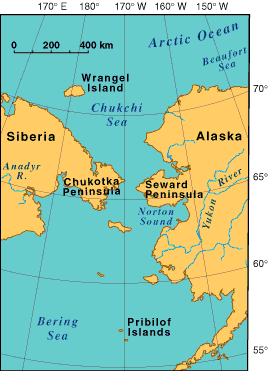
Map of Beringia showing the Seward Peninsula

The Seward Peninsula is a large peninsula on the western coast of the U.S. state of Alaska whose westernmost point is Cape Prince of Wales. The peninsula projects about 200 mi (320 km) into the Bering Sea between Norton Sound, the Bering Strait, the Chukchi Sea, and Kotzebue Sound, just outside the Arctic Circle. The entire peninsula is about 210 mi (330 km) long and 90–140 mi (145–225 km) wide. Like Seward, Alaska, it was named after William H. Seward, the United States Secretary of State who fought for the U.S. purchase of Alaska.

The Seward Peninsula is a remnant of the Bering land bridge, a roughly thousand-mile-wide swath of land connecting Siberia with mainland Alaska during the Pleistocene Ice Age. This land bridge aided in the migration of humans, as well as plant and animal species, from Asia to North America. Excavations at sites such as the Trail Creek Caves and Cape Espenberg in the Bering Land Bridge National Preserve as well as Cape Denbigh to the south have provided insight into the timeline of prehistorical migrations from Asia to the Seward Peninsula.

== Demographics ==
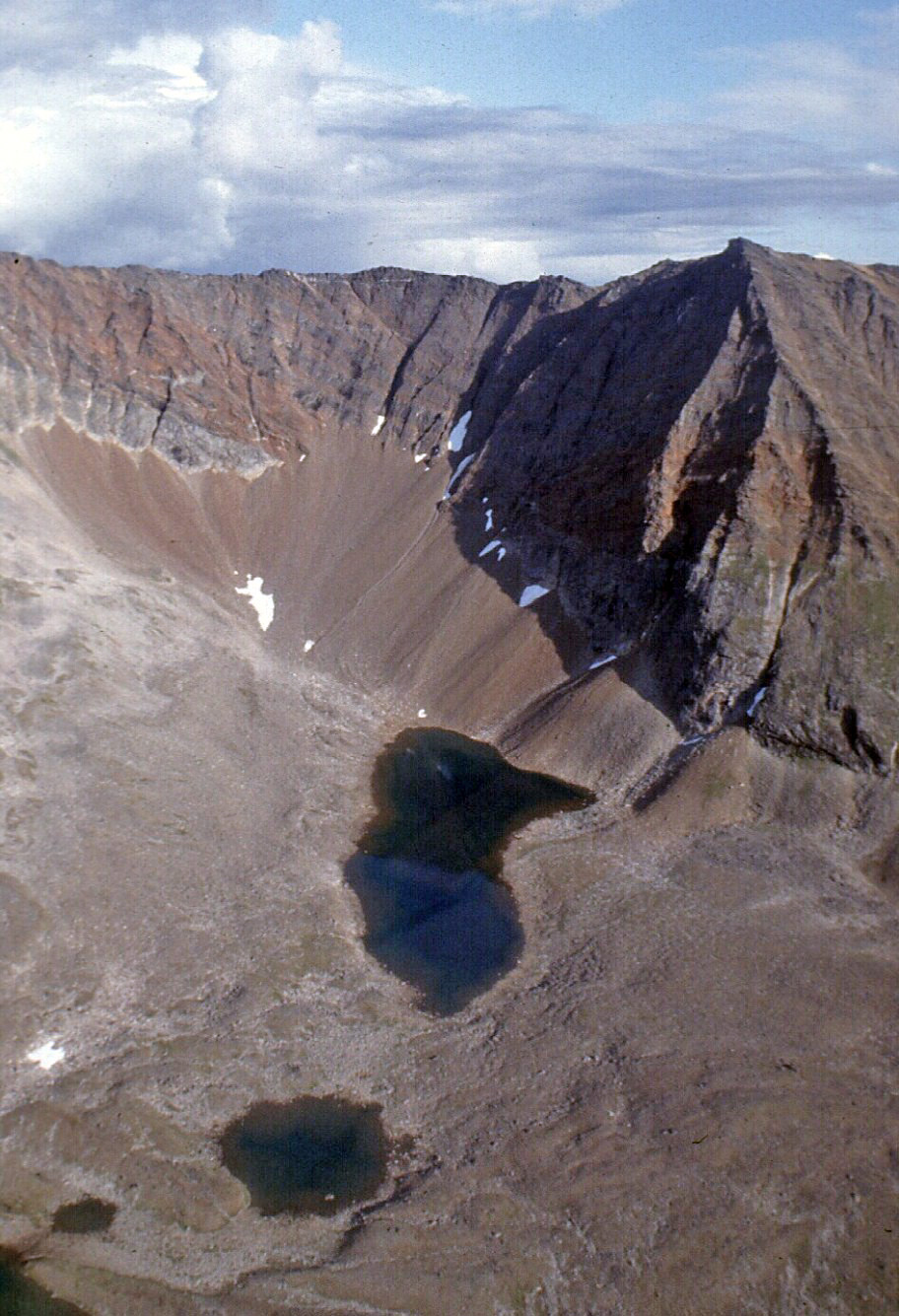
Tarns in Kigluaik Mts., Seward Peninsula

Most of the peninsula is in the Nome Census Area, but part is in the Northwest Arctic Borough. These are the communities on the Seward Peninsula, with 2005 state population estimates:

City	Population
Nome	3,508
Shishmaref	581
Buckland	434
Koyuk	350
Brevig Mission	327
Elim	302
Teller	263
White Mountain	224
Wales	151
Golovin	150
Deering	139

Other locations on the Seward Peninsula include the mining towns of Council, Solomon, Candle, Haycock and Taylor. While still frequented by locals of neighboring communities, there are no longer year round residents in these locations. There was a United States Coast Guard LORAN station at Port Clarence. The U.S. Air Force operates a radar station at the "Tin City" site, 7 mi (11 km) southeast of Wales.

== Geography and ecology ==
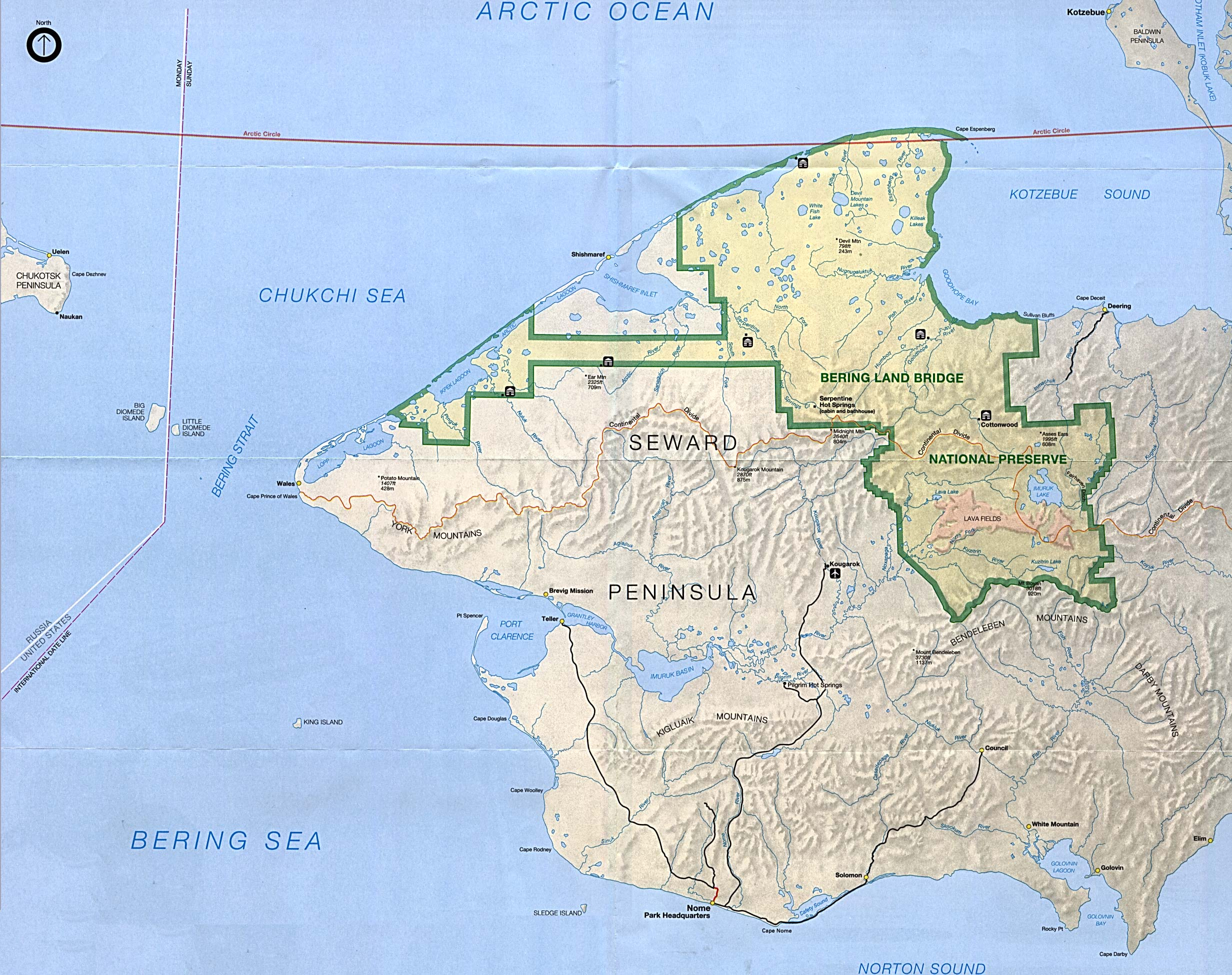
Much of the peninsula is part of the Bering Land Bridge Preserve, administered by the National Park Service

The Seward Peninsula has several distinct geologic features. The Devil Mountain Lakes on the northern portion of the peninsula are the largest maar lakes in the world and part of the Espenberg volcanic field. They were formed over 21,000 years ago as the result of an underground steam explosion. The Killeak Lakes and White Fish Lake are also volcanic maar lakes of notable size on the northern Seward Peninsula. Four mountain ranges line the southern side of the peninsula, the most prominent being the Kigluaik (or Sawtooth) Mountains. The highest point in the range and the peninsula is the peak of 4,714 ft (1,437 m) Mount Osborn. Other mountain ranges on the Seward Peninsula include the Bendeleben Mountains, Darby Mountains, and York Mountains. The Bendeleben Mountains exhibit evidence of recent faulting in the late Cenozoic, with the majority of tectonic deformation and mountain formation occurring in the Cretaceous, which is attributed to regional tectonic block rotation of the Bering plate in the Arctic. The Lost Jim Lava Flow north of Kuzitrin Lake is a lava field formed roughly 1,000 to 2,000 years ago, which covers roughly 88 sq mi (230 km^{2}).

Several geothermal hot springs are located throughout the peninsula, including Serpentine Hot Springs, Pilgrim Hot Springs, Granite Mountain, Elim, Clear Creek and Lava Creek.

The Seward Peninsula has several rivers. The largest include the Koyuk, Kuzitrin, Niukluk, Fish, Tubuktilik, Kiwalik, Buckland and Agiupuk rivers. These play a vital role in the subsistence lifestyles of many peninsula residents and facilitate travel, hunting, and fishing. Most peninsula rivers have at least a small yearly run of several varieties of salmon, as well as Dolly Varden trout, Arctic grayling, whitefish of various species, northern pike, and burbot. Most rivers on the Seward Peninsula freeze in mid-October; spring break-up usually occurs in mid- to late May.

The Seward Peninsula is the westernmost limit of distribution for the black spruce, Picea mariana, a dominant overstory species of the region.

Alaska's reindeer herding was concentrated on the Seward Peninsula ever since the first shipment of reindeer were imported there from eastern Siberia in 1892. It was believed that migrating caribou could be prevented from mingling with the domesticated reindeer on the Peninsula because of the geography of the peninsula, thereby avoiding loss of reindeer that might wander off with caribou. However, in 1997 the domesticated reindeer joined the Western Arctic Caribou Herd on their summer migration and disappeared.

Cape Prince of Wales, the westernmost point on the mainland of the Americas, is on the western tip. The cape is only 51 mi (82 km) from Cape Dezhnev, the closest point on the Russian mainland. In August 2011 Russia announced an ambitious project to construct a rail tunnel under the Bering Strait, linking the Seward Peninsula in Alaska with the Chukchi Peninsula in Russia. If completed, the project would cost an estimated US$65 billion and would be the world's longest tunnel at 64 mi (103 km) long.

The peninsula was named after William H. Seward, the United States Secretary of State who negotiated the Purchase of Alaska from Russia in 1867.
