= Nome–Council Highway =

Highway in Alaska

- Council Road
- Nome–Council Highway highlighted in red

Route information
- Maintained by Alaska DOT&PF
- Length: 71.970 mi (115.824 km)
- Existed: 1906–present
- Tourist routes: Iditarod National Historic Trail

Major junctions
- West end: Nome Bypass Road / Front Street in Nome
- Kougarok Road in Nome
- East end: Dead end at Niukluk River in Council

Location
- Country: United States
- State: Alaska
- Boroughs: Nome Census Area

Highway system
- Alaska Routes; Interstate; Scenic Byways

The Nome–Council Highway is a highway that runs for 71.970 miles (115.824 km) between the communities of Council and Nome in the Nome Census Area of the Unorganized Borough in the U.S. state of Alaska. The road travels east from Nome, following the shore of the Bering Sea until it reaches the ghost town of Solomon. From there, the route travels northeast through the interior of the Seward Peninsula before it terminates on the south bank of the Niukluk River, south of Council. One of three highways traveling from Nome to surrounding communities, the highway is disconnected from the rest of the Alaska Highway System. The route is unpaved for its entire length and becomes impassable for automobiles in the winter outside of a short portion immediately outside of Nome. The portion of the road between Nome and Solomon is part of the Iditarod Trail and the highway passes several historic sites associated with the trail and the area's gold mining history.

The route began as a collection of informal trails connecting Nome with mining communities established on the peninsula at the beginning of the 20th century. In 1906, the Alaska Road Commission constructed a wagon road along most of the length of the trails from Nome to Council. Because of the value of the gold coming from the Council area, this road quickly became the main artery for the region and the Road Commission spent significant amounts of money improving and maintaining the route into the 1930s. However, the road had fallen below state standards by the 1960s and 70s and projects were undertaken to update the highway and replace river-crossing ferries with bridges. The road has been studied since the 1950s as part of a potential Fairbanks-Nome Highway; the expected cost of such a project has consistently prevented any development.

== Route description ==
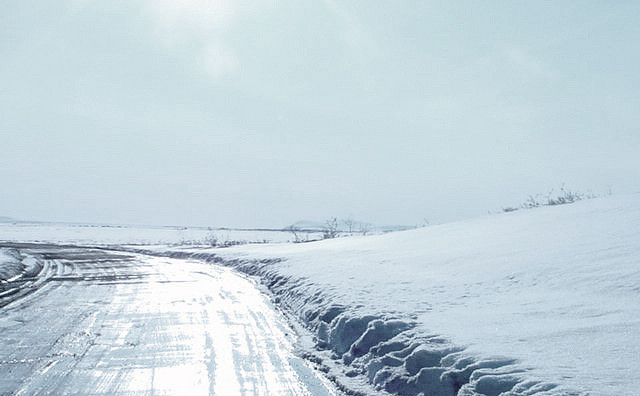
The Nome–Council Highway near Nome

The Nome–Council Highway begins at a T intersection with Nome Bypass Road and Front Street; the former route travels north from the intersection and forms a partial loop around the main built-up area of Nome, while the latter extends westward from the intersection along the Nome seawall into the city. The highway travels southeastward from this intersection, parallel to the Bering Sea. For the first mile, the route passes East End Park Ponds to the north, a city park which contains the Swanberg Dredge and is an important point for bird migration. After approximately 1.3 miles (2.1 km), the highway intersects Kougarok Road, another state highway, which travels 85 miles (137 km) northward to the Kougarok River south of the community of Taylor. After milepost 2, the road bends northeastward around the mouth of the Nome River. On the east bank of the river, the route intersects West Fork Road, East Fork Road, and Fort Davis Road, all of which lead to the former site of Fort Davis, a U.S. Army facility operated during the Nome Gold Rush. The area now hosts scattered houses and fishing huts. The roadway returns to following the coastline for a few miles, before it bends and continues slightly inland. Along this stretch, the highway passes a few quarries. Between miles 12 and 14, the road again follows the shore, traveling around Cape Nome, a large headland.

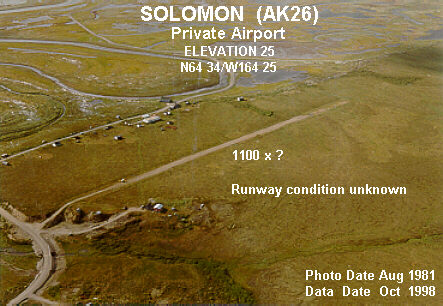
A picture of the airport at Solomon, along the Nome–Council Road.

At Mile 14 the road passes the Cape Nome Roadhouse, the last remaining historical roadhouse on the Iditarod Trail. The road continues east along a sandy spit of land separating Safety Sound from the Bering Sea, crossing the Safety Bridge at Mile 22. Continuing along the Sound as it mixes with the Bonanza River, the road leaves the coast at Mile 31 near the remains of the Council City and Solomon River Railroad, turning left and crossing the Solomon River. At Mile 34 the road passes the Solomon, Alaska townsite, and continues inland to the north following Solomon River. At Mile 45 the road leaves the main river and follows the East Fork of the Solomon River, gaining a significant amount of elevation until at Mile 53 the road reaches Skookum Pass, the highest point on the road. The road then descends to the northeast, reaching the Niukluk River at Mile 72, where the road ends. If conditions allow, the river can be crossed in a high clearance vehicle to reach Council, Alaska.

== Historic sites ==
There are four important landmarks that are listed in the United States National Register of Historic Places within the Nome Census Area.

This National Park Service list is complete through NPS recent listings posted July 4, 2026.

	Name on the Register	Image	Date listed	Location	City or town	Description
1	Swanberg Dredge	Swanberg Dredge	March 12, 2001 (#01000232)	Mile 1 of the Nome–Council Highway; 64°29′33″N 165°21′58″W	Nome	
2	Cape Nome Roadhouse	Cape Nome Roadhouse	December 12, 1976 (#76000361)	Mile 14 of the Nome–Council Highway; 64°26′33″N 164°58′38″W	Nome	
3	Council City and Solomon River Railroad	Council City and Solomon River Railroad	March 2, 2001 (#01000109)	Mile 31 of the Nome–Council Highway; 64°32′46″N 164°26′12″W	Solomon	
4	Solomon Roadhouse	Solomon Roadhouse	September 17, 1980 (#80000760)	Mile 32 of the Nome–Council Highway; 64°33′31″N 164°26′34″W	Solomon	

== Major intersections ==
The entire route is in Unorganized Borough.

Location	mi	km	Destinations	Notes
Nome	0.000	0.000	Nome Bypass Road / Front Street	Western terminus
Nome	1.297	2.087	Kougarok Road (Nome-Taylor Highway)	Southern terminus of Kougarok Road
	2.802	4.509	West Fork Road	
	2.910	4.683	East Fork Road / Antenna Road	
	3.252	5.234	Fort Davis Road	
Solomon	32.888	52.928	Solomon townsite	Access to Solomon State Field Airport
	41.377	66.590	Big Hurrah Road	
Council	71.970	115.824	Dead end at Niukluk River	Eastern terminus
1.000 mi = 1.609 km; 1.000 km = 0.621 mi
