= Bonanza River =

Coordinates: 64°32′N 164°29′W

Bonanza River (alternates, Ki-ul-uk, Bonanza California, Bonanza Cal) (Inupiaq: Kiwaliq) is a waterway on the Seward Peninsula in the U.S. state of Alaska. The headwaters lie close to Venetia Creek and the Koksuktapaga River. It flows southeast for 25 miles (40 km) before reaching Safety Sound, as do the Flambeau and Eldorado Rivers, and then through Safety Inlet to Norton Sound. The village of Solomon is approximately 2 miles (3.2 km) away. Across the divide of West Creek, in the Bonanza River drainage, and lying above the West Creek schists, is a series of green chloride schists and sills of greenstone; these chloritic schists are the prevailing rocks of the divide between Eldorado and Bonanza rivers. In its general character, it is similar to the Eldorado River. Also called Bonanza Cal, later maps indicate California Creek to be a principal tributary of Bonanza River. According to Alfred Hulse Brooks, the Eskimo name is Ki-ul-uk.
