= Salado Formation =

- Stratigraphic range: Changhsingian
- Type: Formation
- Unit of: Artesia Group
- Underlies: Rustler Formation
- Overlies: Castile Formation
- Area: 60,000 square miles (160,000 km^{2})
- Thickness: 1,430 feet (440 m)

Lithology
- Primary: Halite
- Other: Anhydrite, polyhalite, magnesite

Location
- Coordinates: 31.983°N 103.621°W
- Region: Texas, New Mexico
- Country: United States

Type section
- Named for: Salado Wash
- Named by: W.B. Lang
- Year defined: 1935
- Salado Formation (the United States) Salado Formation (Texas)

The Salado Formation is a geologic formation in west Texas and southeastern New Mexico. It was deposited in the Ochoan Stage of the Permian period.

== Description ==
The formation consists of up to 1,430 feet (440 m) of halite with significant anhydrite, red beds, and polyhalite. The formation is found within the Delaware Basin and was deposited after the Capitan Formation, the fossil reef defining the margins of the Delaware Basin. The Salado Formation lies on the Castile Formation and in turn is overlain by the Rustler Formation, and is found almost entirely in the subsurface, with only limited and very poor surface exposures. In locations towards the margins of the Delaware Basin, the Salado Formation is composed mostly of anhydrite and gypsum resembling the Castile, and here the contact is placed at a bed of breccia thought to represent an unconformity between the two formations.

The Salado Formation, and the underlying Castile Formation, form an evaporite sequence that formed in a very deep basin (over 500 meters (1,600 ft)) from increasingly saline waters.

== History of investigation ==
The beds belonging to this formation were initially included in the Castile Formation of George Burr Richardson. In 1935, Walter B. Lang removed the upper beds of the Castile, which include extensive halite beds in the subsurface, into the Salado Formation.
