= Castile Formation =

Geologic formation in New Mexico and Texas, US

- Stratigraphic range: Changhsingian
- Type: Formation
- Unit of: Artesia Group
- Underlies: Salado Formation
- Overlies: Bell Canyon Formation
- Thickness: 300 feet (91 m)

Lithology
- Primary: Anhydrite
- Other: Gypsum, limestone

Location
- Coordinates: 31.841°N 104.375°W
- Region: Texas, New Mexico
- Country: United States

Type section
- Named for: Castile Spring
- Named by: G.B. Richardson
- Year defined: 1904
- Castile Formation (the United States) Castile Formation (Texas)

The Castile Formation is a geologic formation in west Texas and southeastern New Mexico, United States. It was deposited in the Ochoan Stage of the Permian period.

== Description ==
The formation consists of up to 300 feet (91 m) of gypsum or anhydrite with a few thin beds of limestone. The formation is found within the Delaware Basin and was deposited after the formation of the Capitan Formation, the fossil reef defining the margins of the Delaware Basin. The formation lies on the Bell Canyon Formation and in turn is overlain by the Salado Formation, which is characterized in the subsurface by a thick sequence of halite beds. In locations towards the margins of the Delaware Basin, the Salado Formation is composed mostly of anhydrite and gypsum resembling the Castile, and here the contact is placed at a brecciated bed thought to represent an unconformity between the two formations.

The Castile Formation, and the overlying Salado Formation, form an evaporite sequence that formed in a very deep basin (over 500 metres (1,600 ft)) from increasingly saline waters. The presence of fine laminations in the formation, which can be traced over great distances, indicate deposition well below wave base.

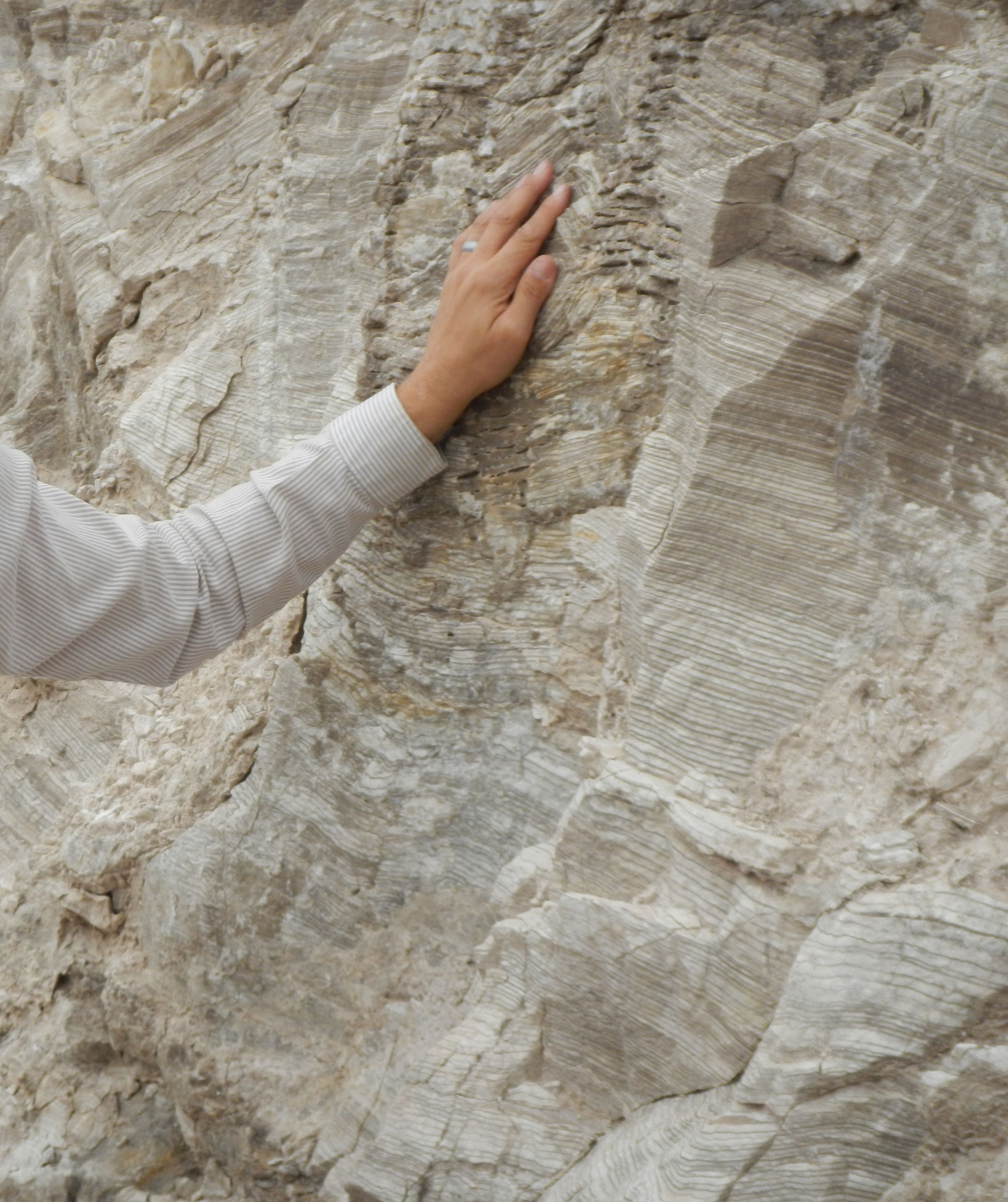
Outcrop of Castile Formation near US Highway 62/180, Mile Marker 5 showing varved gypsum and carbonate laminae

== History of investigation ==
The unit was first named by George Burr Richardson in 1904 for exposures in west Texas. The formation was subsequently trace north into the Pecos River valley and is extensive in the subsurface. In 1935, Walter B. Lang removed the upper beds of the unit, which include extensive halite beds in the subsurface, into the Salado Formation.
