= Dickson, Alaska =

Settlement in Alaska, U.S.

Coordinates: 64°33′20″N 164°24′53″W

Dickson was a settlement in the U.S. state of Alaska. Situated in the Nome Census Area on the Seward Peninsula, it was located directly opposite Solomon, on the east bank of the Solomon River. It was the coastal terminus of the Council City and Solomon River Railroad. All of its industries and inhabitants were connected with the railroad, and at its peak the town featured five saloons, six restaurants and other establishments. Established in 1903, it was named for T. Warren Dickson, general manager of the Western Alaska Construction Company, which built the railroad. By 1910, its population was approximately 50 residents.
