= Shovel Creek (Alaska) =

River near Nome, Alaska, US

Coordinates: 64.61556°N 164.39139°W

Shovel Creek is a waterway in the U.S. state of Alaska, near Nome. It flows into Solomon River from the west about 4 miles (6 km) from the coast. It heads in a divide about 2 miles (3 km) from the Casadepaga River and flows nearly southward to its junction with Solomon River. Although not a very long stream, it has a large drainage area and carries during ordinary seasons about 500 inches (1,300 cm) of water. It has a gradient of about 100 feet per mile (19 m/km). Through the greater part of its course, it spreads over wide gravel bars. The bed rock of the Shovel Creek basin consists for the most part of limestones and calcareous mica schists. Near the head of the creek, there are some intrusions of greenstone. Mining operations in the Shovel Creek basin occurred at three small tributaries—Mystery, West, and Kasson creeks.

== History ==
In the 1910s, the Shovel Creek Gold Dredging Company operated on Shovel Creek, about 2 miles (3 km) above the junction of the creek with the Solomon River. The dredge buckets had a capacity of 2.5 cubic feet (0.071 m^{3}). The ladder was constructed for digging to a depth of 15 feet (4.6 m). Gasoline engines were used to furnish power. The gravel was washed in a revolving trommel from which the screened material went directly to the sluices and the oversize to a belt stacker.
