= Army Peak =

Mountain in Alaska, United States

- Nelson Butte
- Location within Alaska

Highest point
- Elevation: 512 ft (156 m)
- Coordinates: 64°32′20″N 165°11′14″W

Geography
- Location: Seward Peninsula, Alaska, United States
- Topo map: USGS Nome C-1

Army Peak (also known as Nelson Butte) is a summit in the Nome Census Area, Alaska, United States. Its name likely derives from the United States Army's presence in the area after the establishment of Fort Davis in 1900.

It is 7 miles (11 km) northeast of the city of Nome.
