= Eldorado River =

Coordinates: 64°32′N 164°55′W

Eldorado River (alternate Eldorado Creek) is a waterway on the Seward Peninsula in the U.S. state of Alaska. It is situated 14 miles (23 km) west of Solomon. This river has its source within a few miles of Salmon Lake, from which it is separated by a low divide. It flows southeast through a broad gravel-filled valley for 30 miles (48 km) to Flambeau River before emptying into Safety Sound. Its headwaters reach the limestones of the Nome series and much of its course lies in a chlorite-albite-schist belt. The Eldorado River provides a southerly drainage into the Bering Sea.

== History ==
Its local name was recorded in 1899 by Frank Charles Schrader and Alfred Hulse Brooks and it appeared on the 1900 United States Geological Survey map. Gold was reported from a number of the headwater tributaries of Eldorado River. Among others, San Jose, Mulligan, Fox, and Venetia are mentioned; sluicing occurred on the three latter streams. Venetia Creek rises near the headwaters of Canyon and Iron creeks, tributaries of the Kruzgamepa River. Its length is about 10 miles (16 km), and its valley is rather broad. Sluicing was in progress in August, 1900. The bed rock is 2–3 feet (0.61–0.91 m) below the surface.
