= 2022 Iditarod =

Sled-dog race in Alaska, USA

50th Annual Iditarod Trail Sled Dog Race
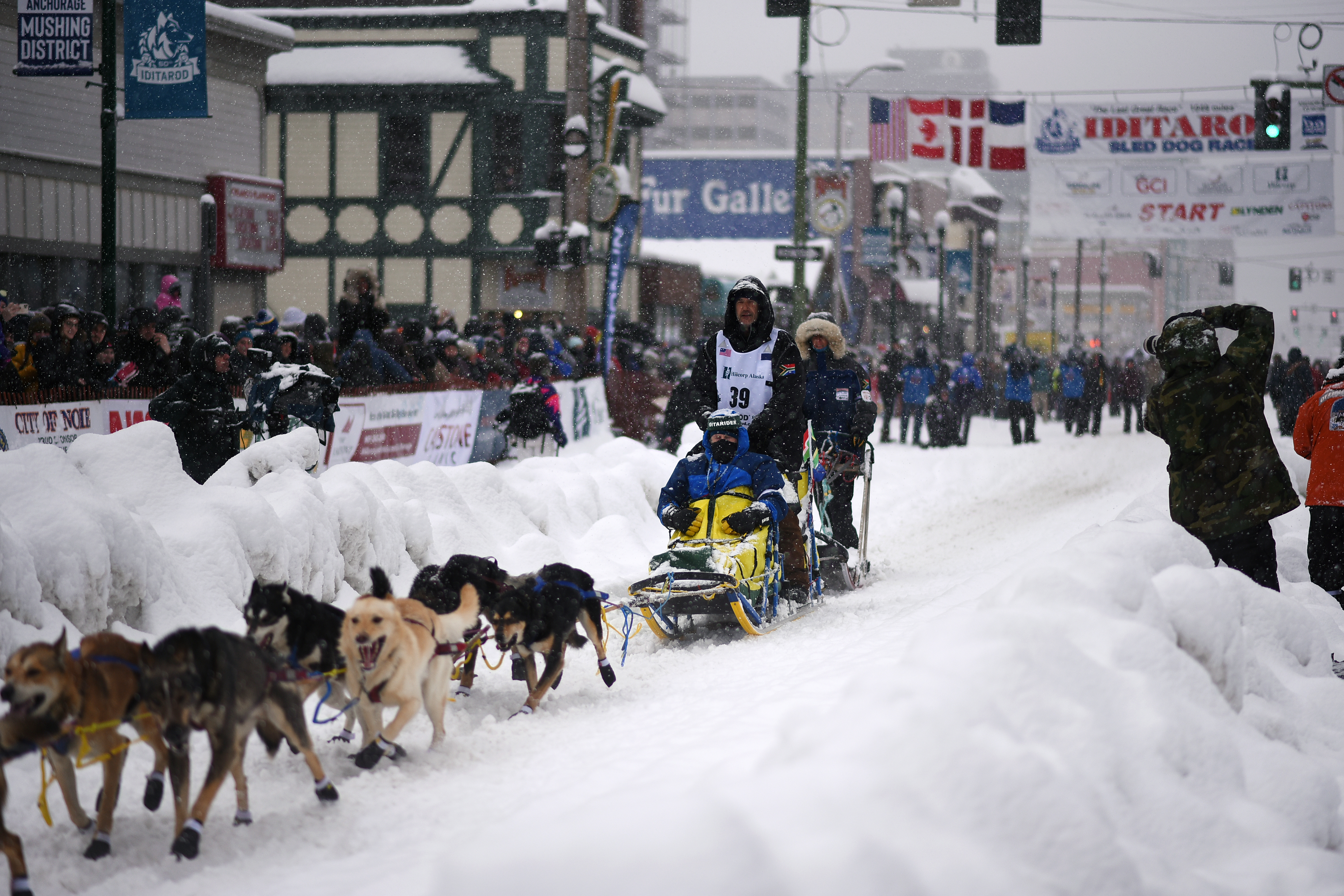
- The ceremonial start of the 2022 Iditarod
- Venue: Iditarod Trail
- Location: Anchorage, Alaska to Nome, Alaska
- Dates: March 5–19, 2022
- Competitors: 49

Champion
- Brent Sass

The 2022 Iditarod was the 50th running of the annual dog sled race. The competition began on March 5 with its ceremonial start in Anchorage. All mushers were required to be vaccinated for COVID-19.

The race was won by Brent Sass, who finished on March 15 with a total race time of 8 days, 14 hours, 38 minutes, and 43 seconds. His 11-dog team was blown off the main route on the approach to Nome due to high winds and low visibility, but Sass recovered to maintain his lead. In second was Dallas Seavey, who was within 90 minutes of Sass. Seavey finished after 8 days, 15 hours, 46 minutes, 51 seconds. By the end of the race, 12 mushers had withdrawn, half of them at the White Mountain checkpoint. Hannah Lyrek was the first rookie to finish, in 19th place, in 10 days, 2 hours, 43 minutes, 12 seconds.

Apayauq Reitan became the first openly transgender woman to be a musher in an Iditarod. Reitan finished in 37th place, the last to cross the finish line. This was her second Iditarod. She participated in 2019 before she transitioned. She became the third person to participate in the Iditarod and Yukon Quest as a rookie in the same year.
