= Solomon Roadhouse =

- U.S. National Register of Historic Places
- Alaska Heritage Resources Survey
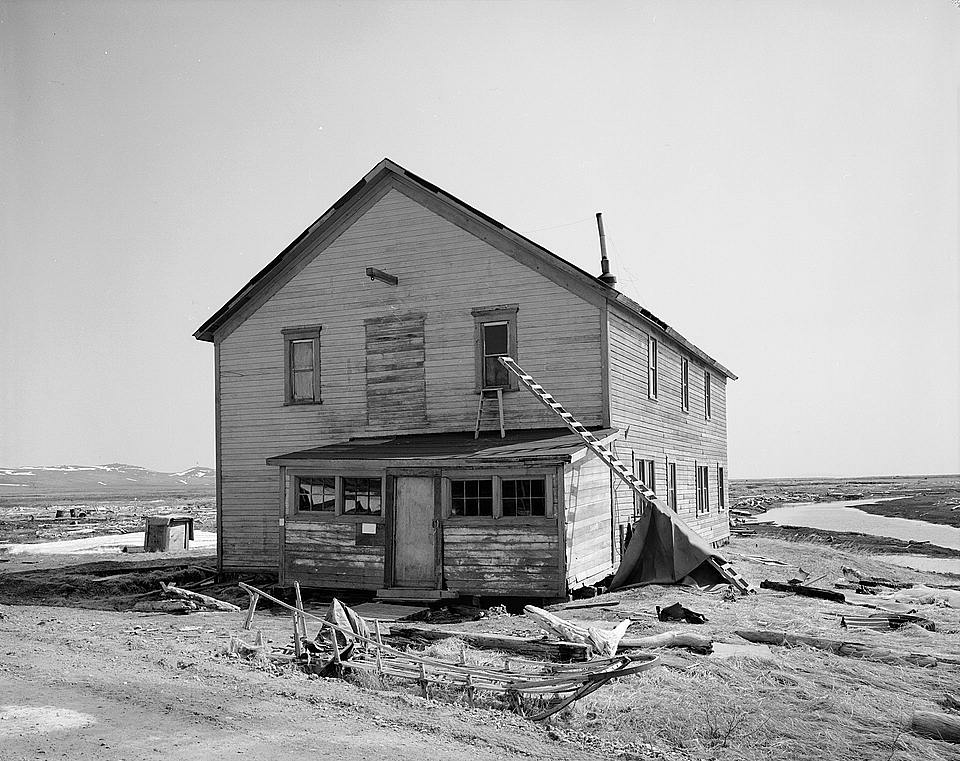
- HABS photo, 1981

- Location within Alaska
- Location: Mile 32 of Nome-Council Highway, Solomon, Alaska
- Coordinates: 64°33′31″N 164°26′34″W
- Area: less than one acre
- Built: 1939
- Built by: Council City & Solomon River RR
- NRHP reference No.: 80000760
- AHRS No.: SOL-031

Significant dates
- Added to NRHP: September 17, 1980
- Designated AHRS: October 21, 1974

The Solomon Roadhouse, also known as the Curran's Roadhouse, is a historic travel accommodation in northwestern Arctic Alaska. It is a two-story frame building located a short way north of the small community of Solomon, which is at the mouth of the Solomon River about 30 miles (48 km) east of Nome on the Nome-Council Highway. The roadhouse was built in 1904, during the days of the Nome Gold Rush, which brought many miners to the Solomon River as well, resulting in the establishment of the communities of Solomon and Dickson, and the construction of a railroad. After the gold rush declined and the communities were devastated by storms and floods, the roadhouse and other buildings were relocated about a mile north of the coast in the 1930s. The roadhouse operated until the 1970s.

The roadhouse was listed on the National Register of Historic Places in 1980.

== See also ==
- National Register of Historic Places listings in Nome Census Area, Alaska
