= Philip Sidney Smith =

American geologist (1877 - 1949)

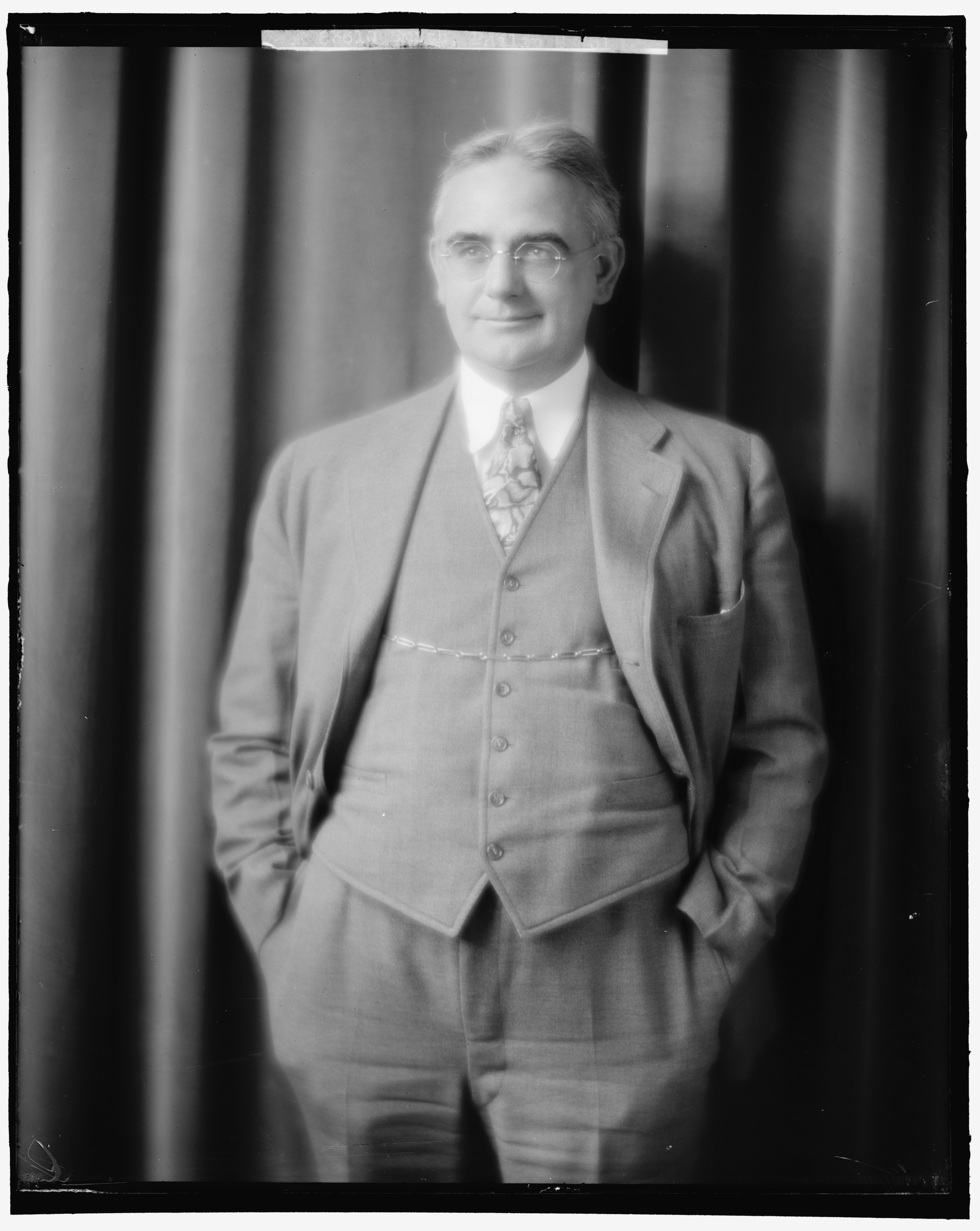
- Born: July 28, 1877; Medford, Massachusetts
- Died: May 10, 1949 (aged 71); St. Albans, Vermont
- Occupation: Geologist

Philip Sidney Smith (28 July 1877 - 10 May 1949) was an American geologist and specialist in the geology of Alaska.

== Biography ==
On 28 July 1877, Smith was born in Medford, Massachusetts. He attended Harvard University, and under the influence of Nathaniel Shaler, entered the field of geology. He earned his Ph.D. from Harvard in 1904, and joined the Alaskan division of the United States Geological Survey in 1906 under Alfred H. Brooks. In 1925, he was promoted to Chief Alaskan Geologist.

In 1929, he served as an official delegate to the Fourth Pacific Scientific Congress in Java, and in 1937, he was Chairman of the US delegation to the Seventeenth International Geological Congress in the Soviet Union. He served as Governor of the Arctic Institute of North America from 1944 until his death.

Smith died of pneumonia on 10 May 1949 in St. Albans, Vermont. He was buried in Wolfeboro, New Hampshire.

== Legacy ==
The Philip Smith Mountains were named for Smith in 1950.
