= Philip Smith Mountains =

Mountain range in Alaska, United States

- Location within Alaska

Highest point
- Peak: Accomplishment Peak
- Elevation: 8,045 ft (2,452 m)

Geography
- Country: United States
- States/Provinces: Alaska
- Range coordinates: 68°19′59″N 148°0′0″W

Geology
- Orogeny: Laramide
- Rock age: Cretaceous

The Philip Smith Mountains are a mountain range in the Brooks Range within the state of Alaska. They extend from the Sagavanirktok River and North Fork Chandalar River on the southwest to Canning River and East Fork Chandalar River on the northeast.

The range was named in 1950 after Philip Sidney Smith (1877-1949), chief Alaska geologist of the USGS from 1925 to 1946.

The highest point in the range is Accomplishment Peak at 8,045 ft.
