= Casadepaga River =

- Location of the mouth of the Casadepaga River in Alaska
- Native name: Qaqsruqtaq (Northwest Alaska Inupiatun)

Location
- Country: United States
- State: Alaska
- District: Nome Census Area

Physical characteristics
- Source: Seward Peninsula
  - coordinates: 64°49′30″N 164°39′12″W
  - elevation: 1,662 ft (507 m)
- Mouth: Niukluk River
  - location: 31 miles (50 km) northeast of Solomon
  - coordinates: 64°58′12″N 164°04′30″W
  - elevation: 164 ft (50 m)
- Length: 32 mi (51 km)

Casadepaga River (also Koshotok and Koksuktapaga) (Inupiaq: Qaqsruqtaq) is a waterway in the U.S. state of Alaska, near Nome. It is the largest southern branch of the Niukluk River. It has a length of about 30 miles (48 km) and a general northeasterly course.

== Geography ==
The gradient of this river does not exceed 13–14 feet (4.0–4.3 m) to the mile. From its mouth to a point within 2 miles (3.2 km) of the head of its longest tributary, the whole fall is not more than 400 feet (120 m). The drainage area is large and the stream is navigable for small boats and canoes for a distance of about 15 miles (24 km). The upland in which the Casadepaga Valley is incised ranges in elevation from 800–1,800 feet (240–550 m). The bed rock of the whole basin consists of the limestones and schists of the Nome group, including many veins and stringers of quartz, some of which are known to be auriferous (gold-bearing). The river occupies a broad and deeply gravel-filled valley, in the floor of which the stream bed is trenched to a depth of 30–150 feet (9.1–45.7 m), leaving well-marked gravel terraces and benches through nearly the whole length. In the lower part of the valley, the stream has cut to bed rock through the gravel deposits in only a few places, but in the headwaters region the gravels overlie broad rock-cut lynches on both banks.

Dawson Gulch joins the river nearly opposite Big Four Creek, which is named after its first four prospectors. On the mica-schist bed rock, which was reached by test pit, flue gold is found associated with garnet. There are several gulches on the east side of the creek between Big Four and Dixon creeks. Massive gray crystalline limestone caps Mount Dixon, north of Dixon creek. Below the limestone is mica schist carrying small quartz veins. Dry Gulch is a small channel incised in the terrace of the main valley. An important consideration relative to the gold resources of the river is the fact that the gold of Dry Gulch and similar streams was not found on bed rock, but occurs in the gravels of the terrace and is usually concentrated on clay seams.

== History ==
On the map accompanying the 1899 report of Alfred Hulse Brooks, this river is vaguely indicated and named the Koshotok; but on the map in the report for 1900 it is called the Koksuktapaga. This was eventually softened into Casadepaga by the United States Geographic Board. The word is undoubtedly of local origin, but its true meaning has not been determined. It is suggested, however, that the last part of it means "mouth of the river" and the first part "loon," so a free translation would be "the river with a loon at its mouth."

The river was first prospected in 1898 by Daniel B. Libby, A.P. Mordaunt, L.S. Melsing, and Harry L. Blake. These pioneers, known as the Big Four, are from whom the largest tributary of the Koksuktapaga receives its name. Claims as far up as Goose and Quartz creeks were located in 1898, but most of the staking on the river and its tributaries was done in 1899. Quartz, Boulder, Dixon, and Spruce creeks reported a few thousand dollars of yield in 1899. This was taken out in the course of prospecting rather than In systematic mining. In 1900, there was a general delay in getting into the area, and later on the low water, consequent to the dry season, delayed transportation of supplies. In the fall, but a short time after sluicing had begun, floods washed away many dams, ditches, and sluice boxes. The season of 1900 was regarded chiefly as a period of further prospecting. The most important development in the Casadepaga basin during the gold mining years was the extension of the Council City and Solomon River Railroad to the mouth of Penelope Creek. This put the district into close communication with the ocean transportation routes. Work along the Casadepaga in 1906 seemed to be carried on more by prospectors than by active settled companies.

== Tributaries ==
In the lower course of the river, near Bonanza Creek, mining camps were established to work low-bench gravels of the Casadepaga. From Bonanza Creek to Penelope Creek, the river gravels have been extensively prospected during the summer months by a drill with a crew. On Big Four Creek, a tributary of the Casadepaga from the south between Bonanza and Penelope creeks, the summer of 1906 saw only assessment work. On Birch Creek, which flows into Big Four Creek about 5 miles (8 km) above the Casadepaga, two camps engaged in working creek gravels below Shea Creek. At Dixon Creek, 2 miles (3 km) above Big Four Creek on the Casadepaga, the bed rock is schist and limestone. Penelope Creek became the terminus of the Council City and Solomon River Railroad, and by this line is about 32 miles (51 km) from Solomon. Three-fourths of a mile above Goose Creek, there is a broad bench of gravels.

== See also ==
- List of rivers of Alaska
