= George Burr Richardson =

American field geologist

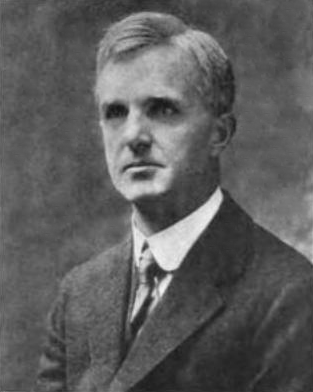
- Born: August 21, 1872; Morrisania, New York, US
- Died: March 18, 1949 (aged 76); Washington, D.C., US
- Burial place: Rock Creek Cemetery
- Education: College of the City of New York; Lawrence Scientific School
- Occupation: Geologist
- Spouse: Irene Dashiell (m. 1904; died 1949)

George Burr Richardson (1872–1949) was an American geologist who participated in extensive field work for the United States Geological Survey (USGS) in Alaska, Pennsylvania, California, Texas, Colorado, and Utah.

In Texas, Richardson described and named 14 geologic formations, 10 from the Cambrian to Lower Cretaceous ages, and two each of the Paleozoic and Precambrian ages. These contributions to stratigraphy formed the basis of all subsequent stratigraphic work in north and west Texas and southeastern New Mexico. Moreover, they led to the identification and development of areas of great economic importance, despite being 10,000 or more feet underground. Richardson's work led to authorship of 70 publications related to geology.

== Early life ==
Richardson was born on August 21, 1872, in Morrisania, a suburb of New York City. His father, George Wentworth Richardson, was a descendant of Samuel Richardson, who was born in England and immigrated to Woburn, Massachusetts, about 1635. Following generations included selectmen in Woburn and Charles Richardson, who was an architect and designed the courthouse in Worcester, Massachusetts, about 1780. Richardson's grandfather moved to Claremont, New Hampshire, where "G.B."'s father was born and lived until he moved to Morrisania.

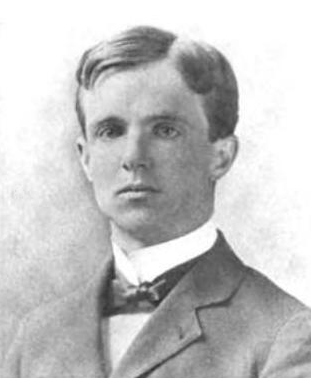
As a Harvard undergraduate, c. 1895

Richardson's mother, Emma Breck, was a descendant of Edward Breck, who emigrated from England to Boston on the James. Following generations were merchants living in Boston until about 1800, when Emma's grandfather, William Breck, moved to Claremont, New Hampshire. Emma's father, James Breck, moved from Claremont to nearby Newport, New Hampshire, where Emma was born and lived until she married George Wentworth Richardson. One of Emma's great great grandfathers was Samuel Chase (1741-1811), a jurist and a signer of the Declaration of Independence, as well as great grandfather of Chief Justice Salmon P. Chase (1803-1873).

Soon after Richardson's birth, his family moved to Chestnut Hill, Mt. Vernon, in Westchester County, where he grew up with a sister, Chester Parker Richardson and a brother, James Breck Richardson. His father died in 1881, when Richardson was nine years old. "G.B." attended public schools and the College of the City of New York. Then, in 1892, he matriculated at Lawrence Scientific School of Harvard University, where he helped earn his way by tutoring Latin and working as an Assistant in the Physics Department, and where he was awarded a BS degree magna cum laude in 1895.

== Career ==
Subsequently, Richardson worked as a chemist at the Warren Paper Mills in Portland, Maine, but by the end of his first winter there, he decided that he wanted the outdoor life of a geologist, rather than the indoor life of a chemist. Harvard professor Shaler, who was much-admired by Richardson, influenced that decision.

Thus in June 1896, Richardson began graduate studies at Harvard on a one-year Thayer Scholarship. From July through September, 1896 he worked as a geologic aide to Professor J.B. Woodworth, a member of Professor Shaler's group that was surveying the Triassic coal basin near Richmond, Virginia, where coal and coke had been mined during Colonial days.

Following his year of graduate work, Ricahrdson assisted J.A. Taff. From July through November, 1897 he helped Taff with field work in Indian Territory, and from January through June, 1898 he worked in Taff's office in Washington, D.C. In 1898, Harvard first established an MS degree, and it was awarded to Richardson on the basis of his prior graduate studies there.

From June through December, 1898 Richardson examined gold prospects in the Stikane District of British Columbia for the Cassiar Central Railway of London. Then, from July through September, 1899 he assisted N.H. Darton with field work in South Dakota. That September he began graduate studies as a Fellow in Geology at Johns Hopkins University. There, he was honored by membership in Phi Beta Kappa and qualified for a PhD after one year, though he was not awarded the degree until June 1901. His dissertation was A Study of the Red Beds of the Black Hills of South Dakota and Wyoming.

From spring until mid-September 1900, Richardson worked with a USGS party led by Alfred H. Brooks (after whom Brooks Range in Alaska is named) that explored the Seward Peninsula, Alaska, and examined in detail the Ophir Creek, Kojsuktapaga, Topkok, and Solomon River mining districts. Afterwards he spent 10 days working in the Nome area during the peak of gold excitement there. On October 29, 1900, he was appointed Assistant Geologist by the USGS.

Next, Richardson worked under Marius R. Campbell in the coal, gas, and oil-field area of western Pennsylvania. Richardson adopted Campbell's unique field methodology and the two became lifelong friends. Richardson was assigned the Indiana quadrangle, which is about 235 square miles. In two and a half months, he discovered that the so-called (by the Second Pennsylvania Geological Survey) "Indiana anticline" is a syncline. He did so by combining results of his areal mapping with subsurface data from logs of exploratory wells that coal, gas, and oil operators made available to him. During subsequent "office seasons" of winter, Richardson prepared the text and illustrations of the Indiana folio, which was published in 1904. It was the third folio of the Geologic Atlas of the United States, which was a product of a co-operative program between the Pennsylvania Topographic and Geologic Commission and the Federal Survey. Richardson later completed reports on five other quadrangles in that region: the New Kensington quadrangle (published 1932), the Somerset and Windber quadrangles (published 1935), the Butler and Zellienople quadrangles (published 1936).

In 1902, from July into October, Richardson did field work in California. There, he, H.R. Johnson, Chester Washburne, and Frank L. Hess assisted J. S. Diller in mapping the areal geology of the Redding quadrangle.

In June 1903, Richardson was transferred to the Western Section of Hydrology, to participate in a joint project with the State Mineral Survey of Texas, directed by W. B. Phillips, to determine the prospect of obtaining water from deep wells in state-owned areas of school lands in El Paso and Reeves counties. The area included about 9,000 square miles and a sequence of about 8,500 feet of rocks. Richardson completed the reconnaissance in six months, assisted by a student from the University of Texas, E. H. Elder, half of the time. The report was published in November 1904 as Bulletin 9 of the University of Texas Mineral Survey. It includes Richardson's stratigraphic work mentioned at the beginning of this article. Recognizing the need for additional geological work in the area, Richardson later was authorized to undertake more detailed surveys of the El Paso and Van Horn quadrangles, which were published as folios of the Geologic Atlas of the United States in 1909 and 1914.

From 1904 into 1907, Richardson worked on geological problems in Utah. Initially, the focus was underground water in the valleys of Utah Lake, Jordan River, Sanpete, and Sevier. However, in 1906, after the Secretary of the Interior withdrew entry from extensive areas of supposed coal lands in Western States, Richardson's work changed focus to the examination and mapping of coal fields as a basis for classification and valuation of public coal lands. That year, Richardson, assisted by W. D. Neal, Leon J. Pepperburg, and C. D. Parrin, made a detailed reconnaissance of the Book Cliffs coal field, between Grand River, Colorado, and Sunnyside, Utah. The final report, USGS Bulletin 371, describes the topography, the stratigraphy, the structure of the field, and the occurrence, character, and development of the coal beds, as well as the quality of coal. Richardson also examined other areas in Utah, which led to his reports on coal in Sanpete County, natural gas near Salt Lake City, antimony in southern Utah, the Harmony, Colob, and Kanab coal fields, and petroleum in southern Utah.

From 1919 to 1932, Richardson was in charge of petroleum and natural gas statistics for the USGS. Also, from 1920 to 1939, he supervised preparation of the oil and gas field maps of California, Illinois, Kansas, Kentucky, Louisiana, Oklahoma, Texas, the United States, West Virginia, and Wyoming, all of which were published by the USGS. Success of this work necessitated that Richardson acquire and maintain the confidence and co-operation of al pertinent oil and gas field operators.

For several years beginning in 1934, Richardson compiled information for various Congressional committees. Perhaps his most outstanding work in this regard (done in collaboration with Hugh D. Miser and Carl H. Dane) was the chapter "Petroleum Reserves", published in 1939 in Energy Resources and National Policy.

== Personal life ==
On June 23, 1904, Richardson married Irene Dashiell of Columbus, Mississippi. In 1898, Dashiell had come to Washington to be official hostess for her uncle, Judge Charles B. Howry of the U.S. Court of claims. Subsequently, she worked as librarian in the War Department until her marriage to Richardson at the home of her sister in Birmingham, Alabama. After the wedding, the Richardson went together to do summer work. Irene and George traveled together for 10 summers until their only child, Alice, was born September 20, 1913.

Irene Richardson died January 10, 1949. George Richardson died at his home in Washington D.C. three months later, on March 18. He was buried at Rock Creek Cemetery.

Richardson was a member of All Souls Memorial Church (Episcopal), the American Association for the Advancement of Science, the American Association of Petroleum Geologists, the Washington Academy of Sciences, the Geological Society of Washington, Phi Kappa Phi, the Cosmos Club, and the Chevy Chase Club.
