= Swanberg Dredge =

- U.S. National Register of Historic Places
- Alaska Heritage Resources Survey
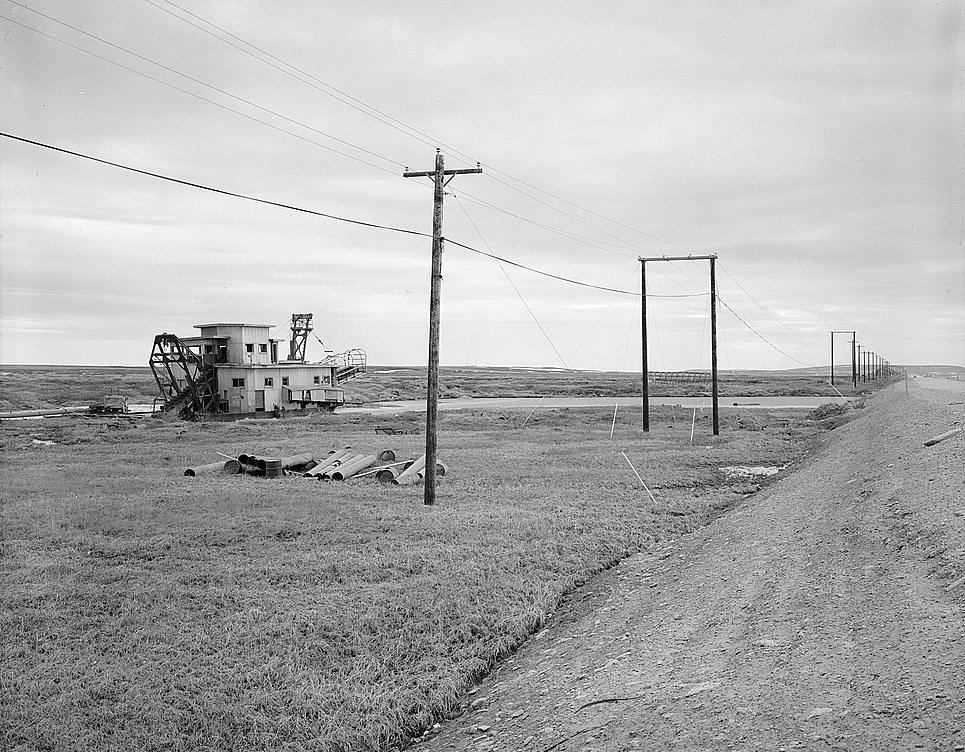
- HABS photo, 1981

- Location within Alaska
- Location: Mile 1 of Nome-Council Highway
- Nearest city: Nome, Alaska
- Coordinates: 64°29′33″N 165°21′58″W
- Area: less than one acre
- Built: 1946
- NRHP reference No.: 01000232
- AHRS No.: NOM-00114
- Added to NRHP: March 12, 2001

The Swanberg Dredge is one of several gold mining dredges that dot the landscape near Nome, Alaska. Also known as the Johnson-Pohl Dredge, this one is located at about mile marker 1 of the Nome-Council Highway just inside the city limits. The dredge stands in a pond about 200 feet (61 m) north of the highway in a small pond. It has a barge-like hull with a mostly single-story superstructure, and measures about 60 by 30 feet (18.3 m × 9.1 m), with a draft of 6 feet (1.8 m). Its metal frame bow gantry extends about 5 feet (1.5 m), and has a digging ladder 40 feet (12 m) long. The dredge was built in San Francisco, California, shipped to Nome, and placed in operation in 1946 by Walter Johnson. The economics associated with the cost of its construction and shipment, as compared to the price of gold, worked against Johnson, who only operated it for a single season before it was seized by a local bank. It has sat in place since then, typifying the sometimes hard-luck small-time mining operations of the area.

The dredge was listed on the National Register of Historic Places in 2001.

== See also ==
- National Register of Historic Places listings in Nome Census Area, Alaska
