= Solomon River (Alaska) =

River in Alaska, United States

Coordinates: 64.65167°N 164.32333°W

Solomon River is a waterway in the U.S. state of Alaska, near Nome.

== Geography ==
It heads close to the Casadepaga River, from which it is separated by a low divide, and, flowing southward for 20 miles (32 km), empties into Port Safety Lagoon about 30 miles (48 km) east of Nome. The placer mines of the region are accessible from the settlements of Solomon and Dickson, at the mouth of the river. Dickson is the terminus of the Council City and Solomon River Railroad. Solomon River discharges into the inlet of Port Safety Lagoon. For 5 miles (8.0 km) above its mouth, Solomon River flows across the coastal plain in a broad trench. Its gradient here probably does not exceed 6–8 feet (1.8–2.4 m) to the mile. Above the coastal plain, the river occupies a comparatively broad valley and the gradient increases to at least 50 feet (15 m) to the mile. In the floor of this valley, the river is entrenched, leaving a system of gravel terraces from 20–50 feet (6.1–15.2 m) above the water. Gravel bars from 100–500 feet (30–152 m) wide, only partially covered at ordinary stages of the water, fill the river bed. The 180 feet (55 m) long wooden bridge, IRR:Nome-Council over Solomon River Bridge, which is owned by the State Highway Agency, crosses the river at Mile Point 41.0.

== History ==
The river was named by Pierce Thomas, who staked Discovery claim in June, 1899. In the same season, the river and its tributaries were prospected, and in 1900 an estimated $10,000 worth of gold was mined in the district. The successful operation of a large dredge on Solomon River in 1905 furnished the final proof that dredges were to play an important part in the mining industry of Seward Peninsula; other dredges had been tried with more or less success, but this was the first to be operated in a large way.

== Tributaries ==
Its more important tributaries, Shovel Creek, Big Hurrah Creek, East Fork, and Coal Creek, enter at right angles and flow approximately east or west. Nugget Creek, a tributary of Solomon River, contained no trace of either gold or silver. Jerome and Manila creeks are two short western tributaries of Solomon River within a few miles of the coast, heading within the coastal plain. Shovel Creek flows into Solomon River from the west about 4 miles from the coast; mining operations in the Shovel Creek basin were confined to three small tributaries—Mystery, West, and Kasson creeks.

- Nugget Creek
- Jerome Creek
- Manila Creek
- Shovel Creek
- Mystery Creek
- West Creek
- Kasson Creek
- Big Hurrah Creek
- Little Hurrah Creek
- Coal Creek
- Penny Creek
- Lion Creek
