= Cape Nome Roadhouse =

- U.S. National Register of Historic Places
- Alaska Heritage Resources Survey
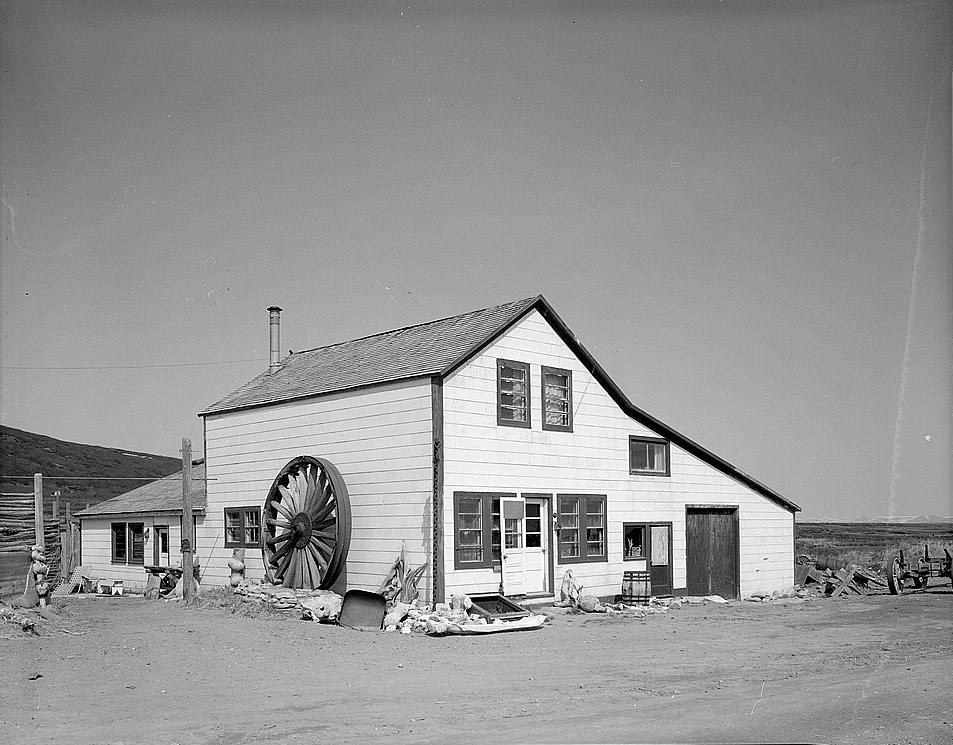
- Cape Nome Roadhouse, from the Historic American Buildings Survey.

- Location within Alaska
- Location: Mile 14 of Nome-Council Highway
- Nearest city: Nome, Alaska
- Coordinates: 64°26′33″N 164°58′38″W
- Area: less than one acre
- Built: 1901
- Architectural style: New England salt box
- NRHP reference No.: 76000361
- AHRS No.: SOL-069

Significant dates
- Added to NRHP: December 12, 1976
- Designated AHRS: March 1972

The Cape Nome Roadhouse is the last remaining historical roadhouse on the Iditarod Trail. Built in 1900 to accommodate travelers to the Nome area during the Nome Gold Rush, it was soon expanded. It has a profile resembling that of a typical New England saltbox house, although its main entrance is on what would normally be considered the side of such a building. Its oldest portion is a log structure, which was expanded with lumber wood framing, and the whole building is now covered with clapboard siding. It is the only structure surviving from the route of a 650-mile (1,050 km) delivery of diphtheria serum in 1925 achieved by a relay of dogsled teams. The roadhouse declined with the advent of aviation to the area, and was used as an orphanage, a military communications facility during World War II, and saw used in the later 20th century as a retail establishment.

The roadhouse was listed on the National Register of Historic Places in 1976.

== See also ==
- Cape Nome
- National Register of Historic Places listings in Nome Census Area, Alaska
