= Fort Davis, Alaska =

Coordinates: 64°29′00″N 165°19′00″W

Fort Davis was a United States Army post established in the Nome Census Area of Alaska in 1900. It was named for General Jefferson C. Davis, the military commander of Alaska from 1868 to 1870.

The Nome Gold Rush led to unrest from claim jumping, claim filing errors, and a general lack of authority. The Army was sent to the Nome area to maintain order. Before Fort Davis was established, soldiers from the port of St. Michael were sent to maintain order in Nome. St. Michael was a transit harbor for the Klondike gold rush and due to its growth during the rush, a military fort was built there in 1897.

Fort Davis was abandoned around 1917 or possibly later based on other sources.

== Demographics ==
Historical population
Census	Pop.	Note	%±
1910	180		—

Fort Davis appeared once on the 1910 U.S. Census as an unincorporated military installation. Owing to its deactivation around 1917, it was not reported again.

== Gallery ==
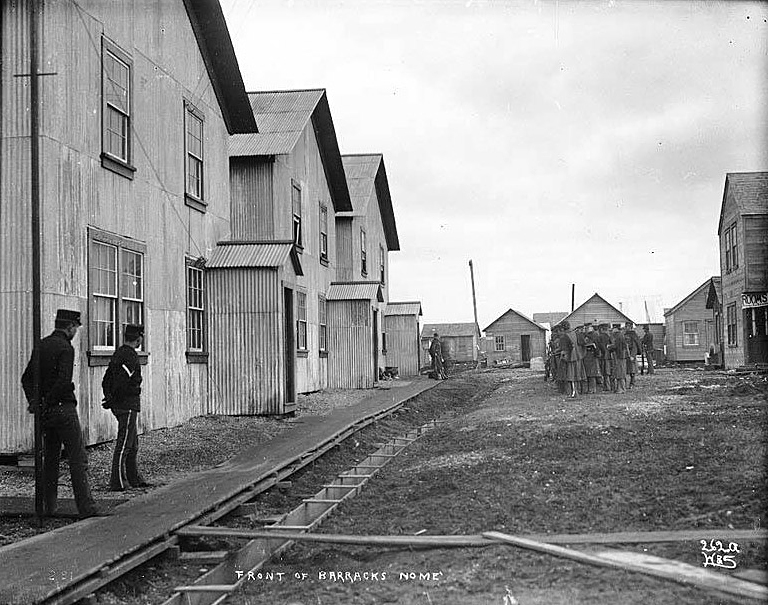
Barracks at Fort Davis, 1900

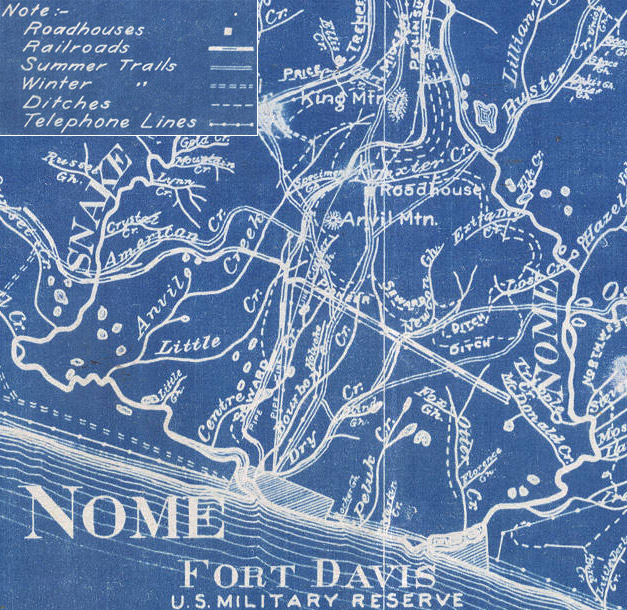
Blueprint of Nome and Fort Davis 1908

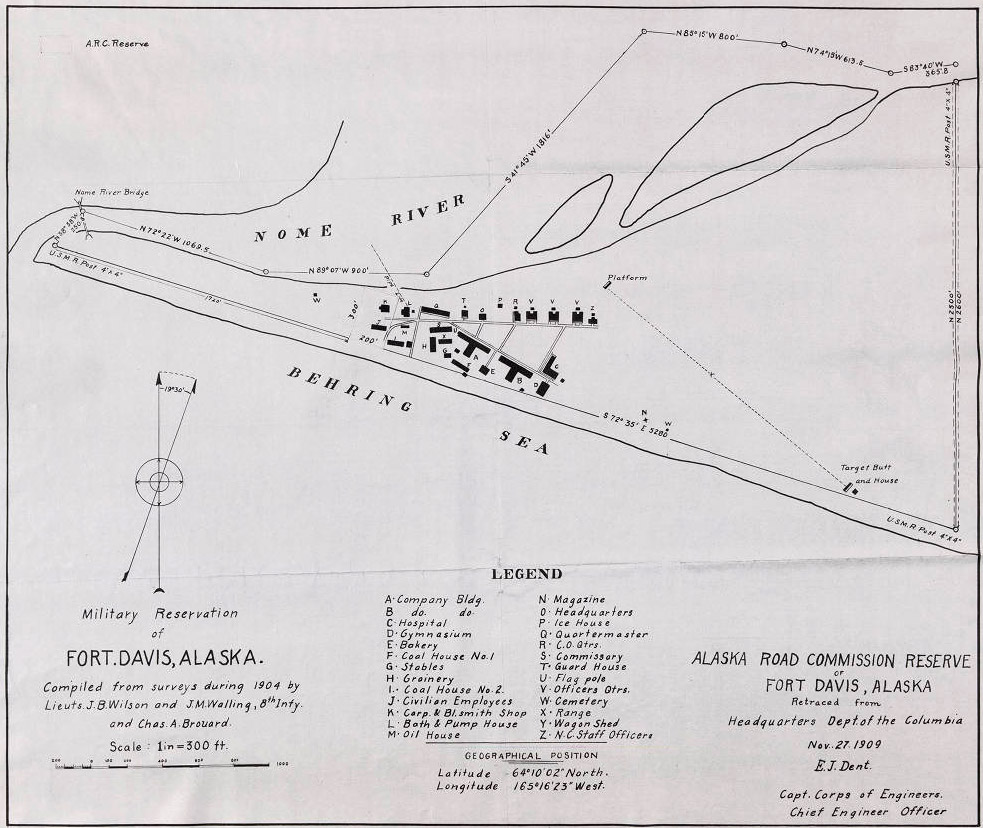
Map of fort itself 1909

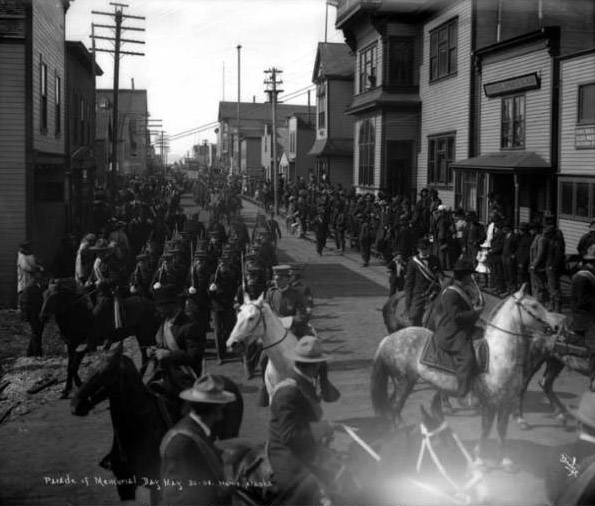
Parade in Nome 1908 showing soldiers
