= Brooks Lake =

Lake in the state of Minnesota, United States

- Location within Minnesota
- Location: Wright County, Minnesota
- Coordinates: 45°5′13″N 94°12′10″W
- Surface elevation: 1,050 feet (320 m)

Brooks Lake is a lake in Wright County, in the U.S. state of Minnesota.

Brooks Lake was named for a pioneer settler.

== See also ==
- List of lakes in Minnesota
