= Council City and Solomon River Railroad =

- U.S. National Register of Historic Places
- U.S. Historic district
- Alaska Heritage Resources Survey
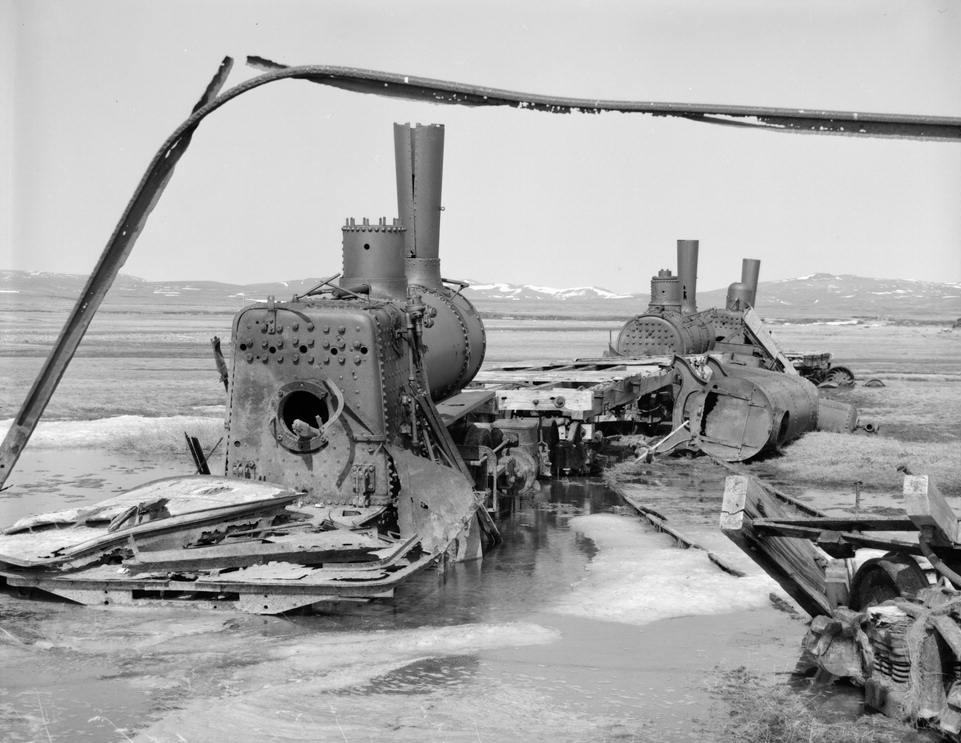
- Rusting locomotives of the Council City and Solomon River Railroad, 1981.

- Location within Alaska
- Location: Mile 31 of Nome-Council Highway
- Nearest city: Nome, Alaska
- Coordinates: 64°32′46″N 164°26′12″W
- Area: less than one acre
- Built: 1903
- NRHP reference No.: 01000109
- AHRS No.: SOL-00032
- Added to NRHP: March 2, 2001

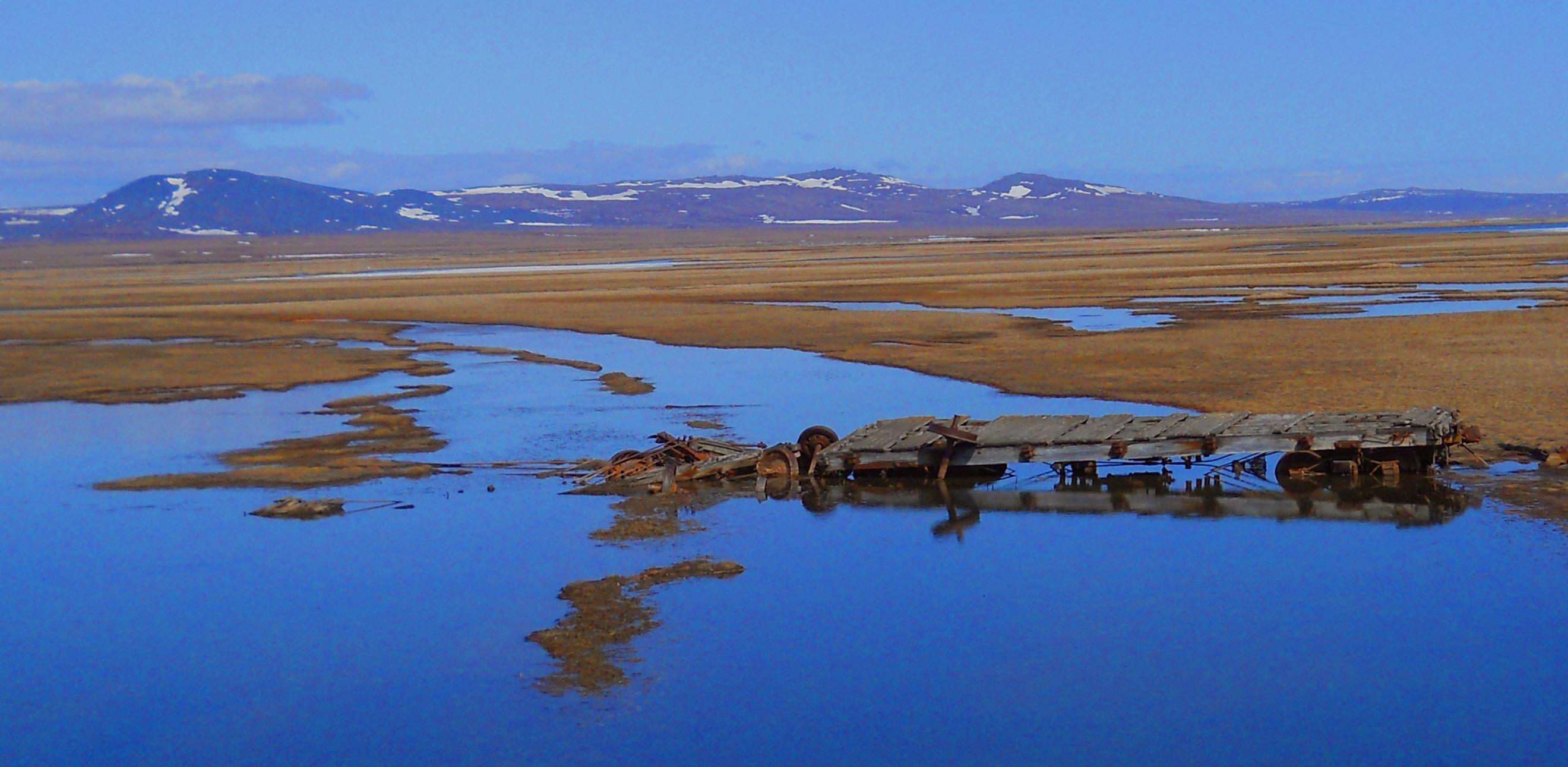
Trains cars of the Council City and Solomon River Railroad in Solomon.

Council City and Solomon River Railroad is an abandoned railroad in the U.S. state of Alaska. Its name refers to Solomon River and the city of Council in the Nome Census Area. The railway operated from 1903 to 1907. The remains of the railroad at Mile 31 of the Nome-Council Highway, comprising three locomotives, two flat cars and a boiler, were listed as an historic district on the National Register of Historic Places in 2001.

== Western Alaska Construction Company ==
Organized under the laws of New Jersey, the Western Alaska Construction Co., with a capital stock of $1,000,000, organized for the purpose of constructing the Council City & Solomon River R. R. and extensions. The company was composed principally of Chicago businessmen. The company offices were in Chicago, with fiscal agents in New York City. Its officers were:

- John R. Bowman, president
- J. Warren Dickson, vice-president and general manager
- William F. Krohmer, treasurer
- Jacob A. Freund, secretary

Its stockholders were J. A. Freund, Samuel P. Herron, William F. Krohmer, John Ryeerson Bowman, and J. Warren Dickson.

== History ==
The railroad was among the important enterprises inaugurated in the summer of 1903. Before the close of the season, about 9 miles (14 km) of standard-gage track had been laid. The Western Alaska Construction Co. asserted that the mouth of the Solomon River, the starting point of their road, was the only point on the south coast of the Seward Peninsula which had a sheltered harbor convenient for the loading and unloading of freight and the protection of it in all types of weather. They proposed to locate the tidewater terminus here, and build the railroad northward and westward, penetrating the most important gold fields of Alaska, the Cape Nome fields. Running from Solomon City, the Council City & Solomon River R. R. was to skirt the Solomon river, passing hundreds of mining camps, en route to Council City, the first terminus of the road. According to the report of the Chief of the Bureau of Statistics at Washington, Council City is the general distributing point of the Upper Niukluk basin. From Solomon City to Council City the distance is approximately 50 miles; from that point the railroad was projected to connect all the principal mineral producing areas and centres of population and mining, including the line to Grantley Harbor, Port Clarence, Good Hope bay, and Nome, thus "gridironing" the peninsula. Initial cost estimates were from $8,000 to $12,000 per mile. The company's surveys were executed by engineers who were official surveyors of the United States government, Paul Heinze, chief engineer, and Hermann Heinze, assistant engineer. The company's rights of way included 100 feet on each side of the centre line of their tracks, with 40 acres as terminal station grounds at each end of the road; plus 20 acres for station grounds for each 10 miles of track. This acreage totaled 13,000 acres.

The route described in the articles of incorporation was from a point near the mouth of Solomon River adjacent to Solomon City to a point adjacent to Council City. The company filed two maps of its preliminary line from Council City along Fox River, right branch Solomon River to Solomon City, 50.79 miles (filed February, 1903); and one from Nome City to Wheeler, 20 miles (filed June, 1904); also one map of definite location from point on Norton Sound near Dickson up Solomon River, 20 miles (filed January 3, 1905). New map of same line filed December 20, 1906.

== See also ==
- National Register of Historic Places listings in Nome Census Area, Alaska
