= Nome Census Area, Alaska =

Census area in Alaska, United States

- Borough
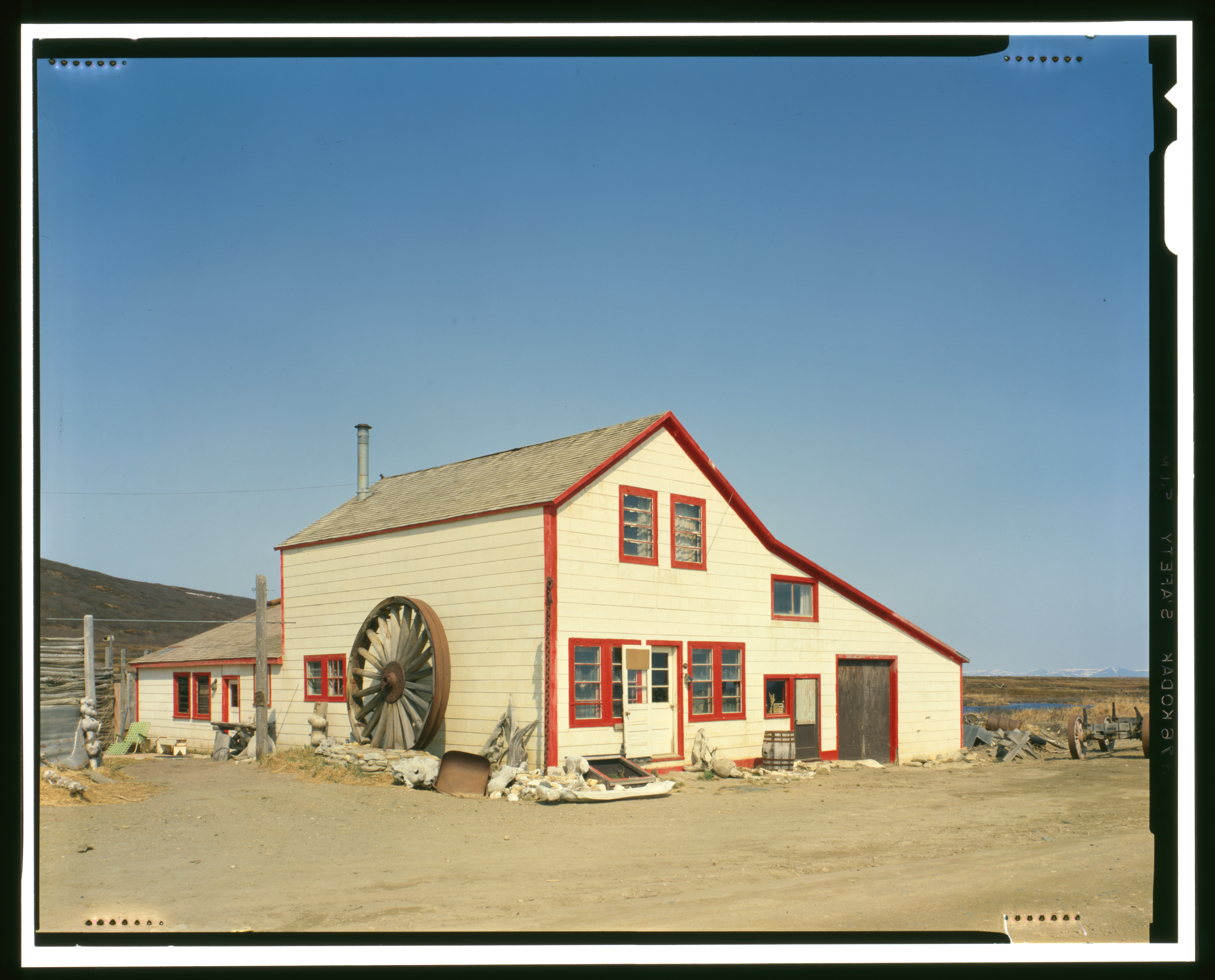
- Iditarod Trail Shelter Cabins, Cape Nome Roadhouse, Cape Nome

- Location within the U.S. state of Alaska
- Coordinates: 64°44′N 164°11′W
- Country: United States
- State: Alaska
- Established: 1980
- Named for: Nome
- Largest city: Nome

Area
  - Total: 28,278 sq mi (73,240 km^{2})
  - Land: 22,962 sq mi (59,470 km^{2})
  - Water: 5,316 sq mi (13,770 km^{2}) 18.8%

Population (2020)
  - Total: 10,046
  - Estimate (2025): 9,830 ▼
  - Density: 0.43751/sq mi (0.16892/km^{2})
- Time zone: UTC−9 (Alaska)
  - Summer (DST): UTC−8 (ADT)
- Congressional district: At-large

Nome Census Area is a census area located in the U.S. state of Alaska, mostly overlapping with the Seward Peninsula. As of the 2020 census, the population was 10,046, up from 9,492 in 2010. It is part of the unorganized borough and therefore has no borough seat. Its largest community by far is the city of Nome.

== Geography ==
According to the United States Census Bureau, the census area has a total area of 28,278 square miles (73,240 km^{2}), of which 22,962 square miles (59,470 km^{2}) is land and 5,316 square miles (13,770 km^{2}) (18.8%) is water. It also includes the large offshore St. Lawrence Island, which has about 14 percent of the census area's population and two of its larger cities in Gambell and Savoonga. Nome Census Area is the 7th largest county-equivalent in the state of Alaska.

=== Adjacent boroughs and census areas ===
- Northwest Arctic Borough, Alaska - north
- Yukon–Koyukuk Census Area, Alaska - east
- Kusilvak Census Area, Alaska - south
- Chukotsky District, Chukotka Autonomous Okrug - west

=== National protected areas ===
- Alaska Maritime National Wildlife Refuge (part of the Bering Sea unit)
  - Besboro Island
  - King Island
  - Sledge Island
- Bering Land Bridge National Preserve (part)
- Yukon Delta National Wildlife Refuge (part)
  - Andreafsky Wilderness (part)

== Demographics ==
Historical population
Census	Pop.	Note	%±
1960	6,091		—
1970	5,749		−5.6%
1980	6,537		13.7%
1990	8,288		26.8%
2000	9,196		11.0%
2010	9,492		3.2%
2020	10,046		5.8%
2025 (est.)	9,830	▼	−2.2%
U.S. Decennial Census; 1790-1960 1900-1990; 1990-2000 2010-2020

=== 2020 census ===
As of the 2020 census, the county had a population of 10,046 and a median age of 29.8 years. 32.8% of residents were under the age of 18 and 8.4% of residents were 65 years of age or older.

For every 100 females there were 111.1 males, and for every 100 females age 18 and over there were 115.1 males age 18 and over.

The racial makeup of the county was 14.2% White, 0.5% Black or African American, 75.2% American Indian and Alaska Native, 1.1% Asian, 0.0% Native Hawaiian and Pacific Islander, 0.6% from some other race, and 8.4% from two or more races. Hispanic or Latino residents of any race comprised 1.9% of the population.

0.0% of residents lived in urban areas, while 100.0% lived in rural areas.

There were 3,030 households in the county, of which 46.1% had children under the age of 18 living with them and 25.0% had a female householder with no spouse or partner present. About 24.3% of all households were made up of individuals and 6.0% had someone living alone who was 65 years of age or older.

Nome Census Area, Alaska – Racial and ethnic composition Note: the US Census treats Hispanic/Latino as an ethnic category. This table excludes Latinos from the racial categories and assigns them to a separate category. Hispanics/Latinos may be of any race.
Race / Ethnicity (NH = Non-Hispanic)	Pop 1980	Pop 1990	Pop 2000	Pop 2010	Pop 2020	% 1980	% 1990	% 2000	% 2010	% 2020
White alone (NH)	1,266	1,987	1,752	1,511	1,393	19.37%	23.97%	19.05%	15.92%	13.87%
Black or African American alone (NH)	21	9	35	27	52	0.32%	0.11%	0.38%	0.28%	0.52%
Native American or Alaska Native alone (NH)	5,174	6,132	6,881	7,175	7,508	79.15%	73.99%	74.83%	75.59%	74.74%
Asian alone (NH)	32	51	62	88	109	0.49%	0.62%	0.67%	0.93%	1.09%
Native Hawaiian or Pacific Islander alone (NH)	x	x	2	9	5	x	x	0.02%	0.09%	0.05%
Other race alone (NH)	17	3	2	8	25	0.26%	0.04%	0.02%	0.08%	0.25%
Mixed race or Multiracial (NH)	x	x	370	559	768	x	x	4.02%	5.89%	7.64%
Hispanic or Latino (any race)	27	106	92	115	186	0.41%	1.28%	1.00%	1.21%	1.85%
Total	6,537	8,288	9,196	9,492	10,046	100.00%	100.00%	100.00%	100.00%	100.00%

=== 2000 census ===
As of the census of 2000, there were 9,196 people, 2,693 households, and 1,898 families living in the census area. The population density was 0.3 people per square mile (0.12 people/km^{2}). There were 3,649 housing units at an average density of 0 per square mile (0/km^{2}). The racial makeup of the census area was 19.32% White, 0.38% Black or African American, 75.20% Native American, 0.67% Asian, 0.02% Pacific Islander, 0.20% from other races, and 4.21% from two or more races. 1.00% of the population were Hispanic or Latino of any race. 16.32% reported speaking a Yupik language at home, while 8.75% speak Inupiaq; a further 2.02% reported speaking "Eskimo", a term that covers both Yupik and Inupiaq.

Of the 2,693 households, 45.80% had children under the age of 18 living with them, 42.40% were married couples living together, 15.30% had a female householder with no husband present, and 29.50% were non-families. 23.20% of households were one person, and 3.30% were one person aged 65 or older. The average household size was 3.33 and the average family size was 4.01.

In the census area 37.10% of the population was under the age of 18, 9.30% was from 18 to 24, 29.00% from 25 to 44, 18.60% from 45 to 64, and 5.90% was 65 or older. The median age was 28 years. For every 100 females, there were 117.60 males. For every 100 females age 18 and over, there were 122.70 males.

== Communities ==
=== Cities ===
- Brevig Mission
- Diomede
- Elim
- Gambell
- Golovin
- Koyuk
- Nome
- Savoonga
- Shaktoolik
- Shishmaref
- St. Michael
- Stebbins
- Teller
- Unalakleet
- Wales
- White Mountain

=== Census-designated place ===
- Port Clarence

=== Unincorporated communities ===
- Haycock
- Solomon

== Politics ==
United States presidential election results for Nome Census Area, Alaska
Year	Republican		Democratic		Third party(ies)	
Year	No.	%	No.	%	No.	%
1960	1,007	55.98%	792	44.02%	0	0.00%
1964	410	23.60%	1,327	76.40%	0	0.00%
1968	817	44.21%	929	50.27%	102	5.52%
1972	911	49.48%	812	44.11%	118	6.41%
1976	989	51.16%	887	45.89%	57	2.95%
1980	938	43.41%	953	44.10%	270	12.49%
1984	1,657	59.60%	1,059	38.09%	64	2.30%
1988	1,452	57.17%	993	39.09%	95	3.74%
1992	1,147	38.01%	1,222	40.49%	649	21.50%
1996	1,206	40.42%	1,444	48.39%	334	11.19%
2000	1,637	51.51%	1,217	38.29%	324	10.20%
2004	1,489	52.91%	1,171	41.61%	154	5.47%
2008	1,618	48.31%	1,728	51.60%	3	0.09%
2012	1,096	30.80%	2,264	63.61%	199	5.59%
2016	935	28.40%	1,689	51.31%	668	20.29%
2020	1,287	35.09%	2,131	58.10%	250	6.82%
2024	1,167	41.78%	1,424	50.98%	202	7.23%

Nome Census Area is somewhat of a national bellwether, having backed the national winner all but six times since statehood. In recent years, it has become significantly Democratic, like other places with a large Native majority. Downballot, Nome has been more consistently left-wing and voted for Democrats until Mike Dunleavy's 2022 landslide.

== See also ==
- List of airports in the Nome Census Area
- Army Peak
