= Alfred Hulse Brooks =

American geologist (1871–1924)

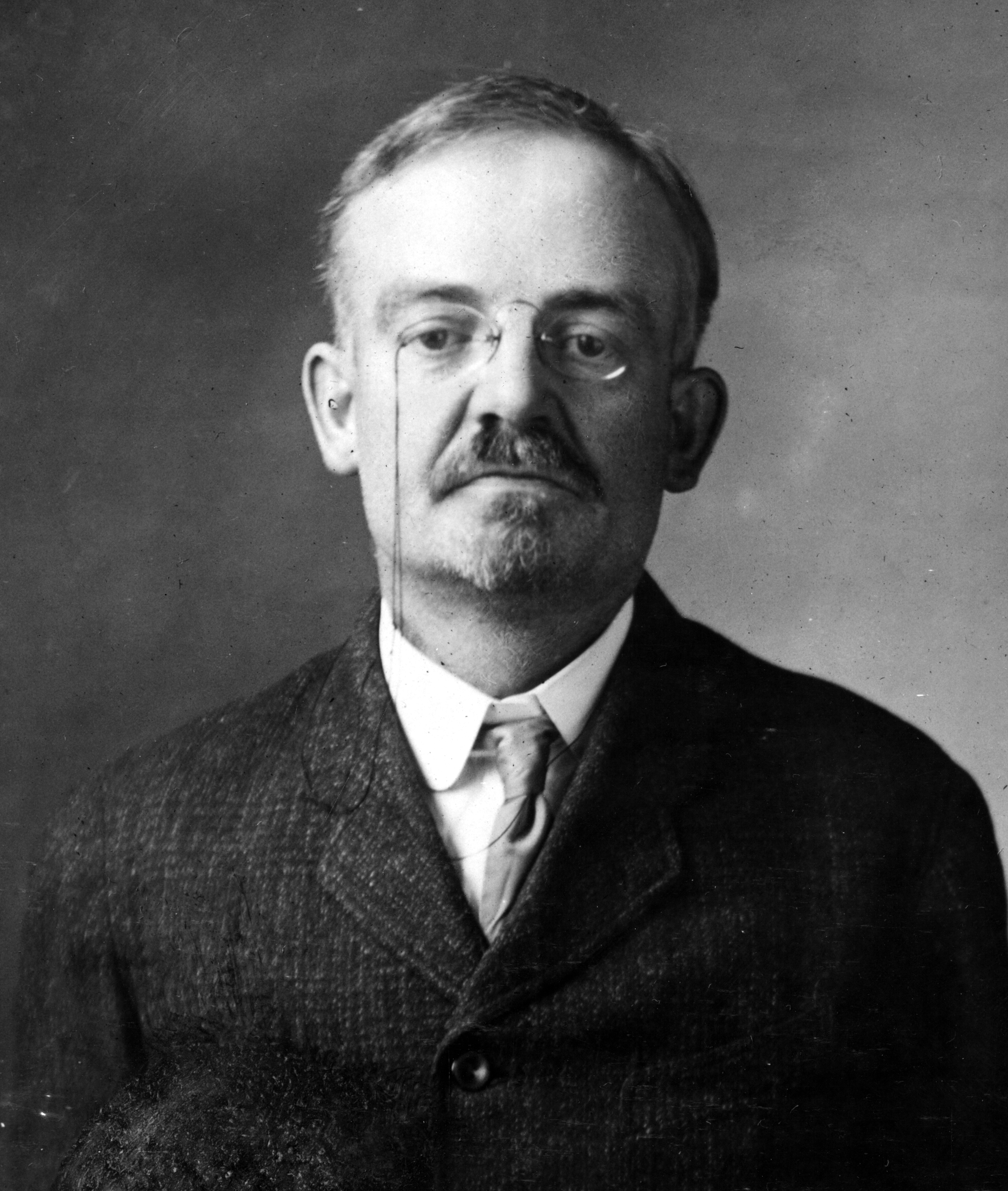
- Born: July 18, 1871; Ann Arbor, Michigan
- Died: November 22, 1924 (aged 53); Washington, D.C., U.S.
- Resting place: Oak Hill Cemetery; Washington, D.C., U.S.
- Education: Harvard University
- Children: 2

Alfred Hulse Brooks (July 18, 1871 – November 22, 1924) was an American geologist who served as chief geologist for Alaska for the United States Geological Survey from 1903 to 1924. He is credited with discovering that the biggest mountain range in Arctic Alaska, now called the Brooks Range, was separate from the Rocky Mountains. He also took many photographs of local communities. A collection of the images is held at Yale University.

== Early life ==
Alfred Hulse Brooks was born on July 18, 1871, in Ann Arbor, Michigan, to Hannah (née Hulse) and Thomas Benton Brooks. He was educated at a private school in Newburgh, New York. He graduated from Harvard University in 1894. After his graduation, he also studied in Germany and Paris.

== Career ==
In 1898, the federal government announced a systematic topographic and geologic survey of Alaska that would include renewed exploration of what became known as the Brooks Range. Alfred Hulse Brooks, the new assistant geologist and head of the Alaskan branch of the United States Geological Survey (USGS), called the project "far more important than any previously done," due in large part because it "furnished the first clue to the geography and geology of the part of Alaska north of the Yukon Basin." Between 1899 and 1911, six major reconnaissance expeditions traversed the mountain range, mapping its topography and geology and defining the patterns of economic geology so important to prospectors and miners. He was appointed geological curator of Alaskan mineral resources 1902.

Every year from 1904 to 1916 and from 1919 to 1923, Brooks wrote summaries of Alaska's mineral industries. The missed years, during World War I, were those that he spent in France as chief geologist for the American Expeditionary Force in France.

== Personal life ==
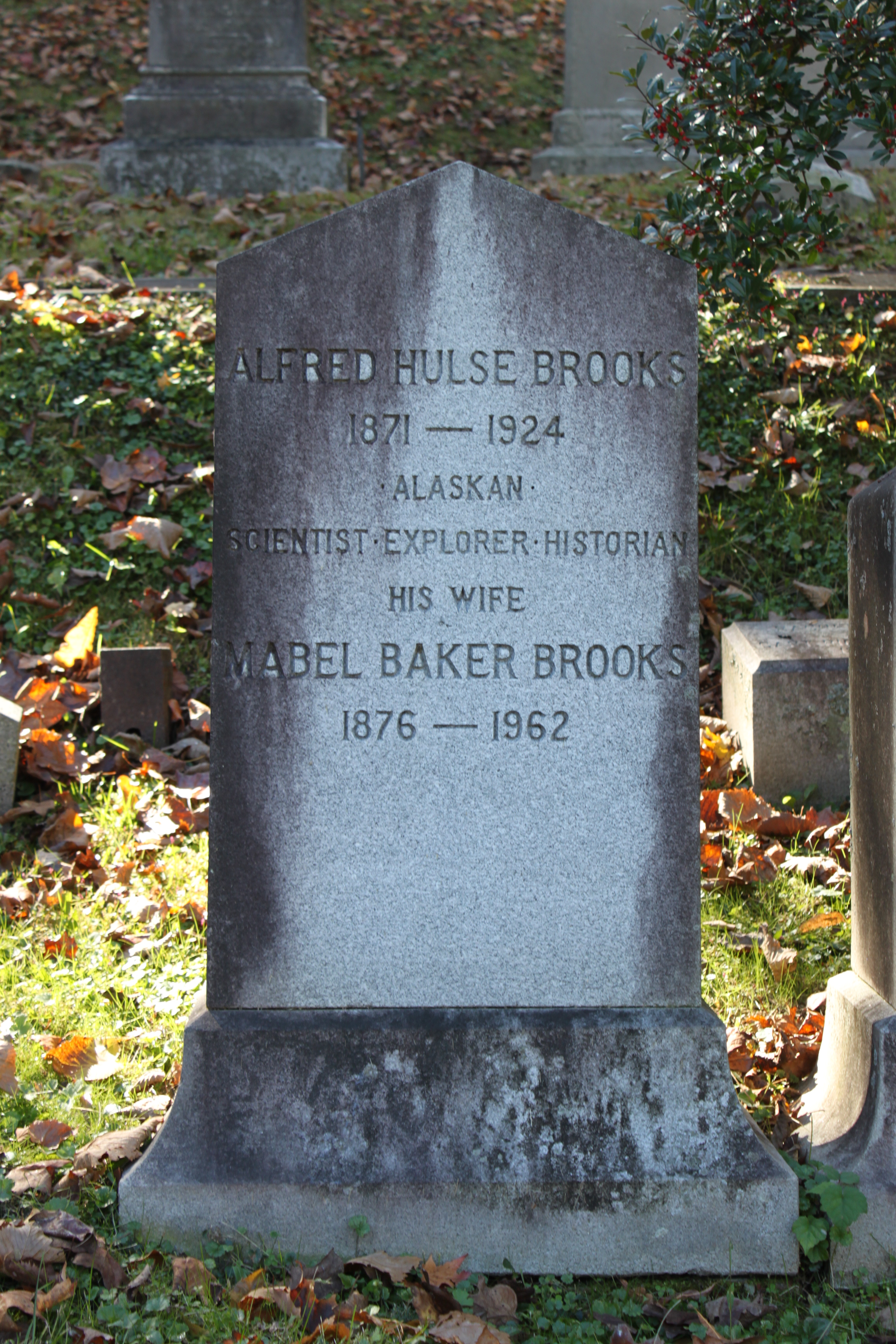
Grave of Brooks at Oak Hill Cemetery

Brooks married. He had two children, Mary and Benton.

Brooks had a stroke at his desk at the Interior Department. He died the following morning, November 22, 1924, at a hospital in Washington, D.C. Brooks was buried at Oak Hill Cemetery in Washington, D.C.

== Honors ==
- 1913 - Received the Charles P. Daly Medal of the American Geographical Society.
- 1913 - Received the Malte-Brun gold medal of the Geographical Society of Paris, France.
- 1925 - The Brooks Range, a mountain range that stretches from west to east across northern Alaska and into Canada's Yukon Territory was named for Mr. Brooks.
- Mount Brooks and the Brooks Glacier in Denali National Park are named for him.
- The Brooks Building at the University of Alaska Fairbanks is named for him in July 1952. The building housed the university's mining engineering and related programs for several decades until 1995. Reopening in 2002, it currently houses their programs and services for Alaska Native students.
- The mineral Hulsite is named for Mr. Brooks.
- Brooks Falls and Brooks Lake in Katmai National Park and Preserve are named for him.

== Publications ==
- "Preliminary report on the Ketchikan mining district, Alaska, with an introductory sketch of the geology of southeastern Alaska" by Alfred Hulse Brooks. US Geological Survey Professional Paper No. 1, 1902
- "The geography and geology of Alaska: a summary of existing knowledge" by Alfred Hulse Brooks, Cleveland Abbe, and Richard Urquhart Goode. US Geological Survey Professional Paper No. 45, 1906.
- Railway Routes in Alaska (1907)
- Mining and Mineral Wealth of Alaska (1909) Alaska-Yukon-Pacific Exposition, Seattle, Washington, 1909. Dept. of the Interior. Alaskan exhibit. Washington: Judd and Detweiler. 46 p. double map.
- The Mount McKinley Region, Alaska USGS Professional Paper No. 70 (1911)
- Gold, Silver, Copper, Lead and Zinc in Western States and Alaska (1913)
- "Mineral resources of Alaska, report on progress of investigations in 1912" by Alfred Hulse Brooks, G.C. Martin, Philip Sidney Smith. US Geological Survey Bulletin No. 542, 1913. 308 p.
- "The German defenses of the Lorraine Front" by Alfred Hulse Brooks. United States Army, American Expeditionary Forces. 1918.
- "The iron and associated industries of Lorraine, the Saare district, Luxemburg, and Belgium" by Alfred H. Brooks and Morris F. La Croix. US Geological Survey Bulletin No. 703, 1920.
- "The Use of Geology on the Western Front" by Alfred H. Brooks. United States Geological Survey, Professional Paper 128-D.

== Sources ==
- "Alfred Hulse Brooks" by George Otis Smith Science, Volume 61, Issue 1569, pp. 80–81
- "Memorial of Alfred Hulse Brooks" by Philip Sidney Smith. Geological Society of America Bulletin; March 1926; v. 37; no. 1; p. 15-48
