= Ochoan =

The Ochoan is a stage in the Permian stratigraphy (and an age in the geologic timescale) of North America. The Ochoan age is roughly simultaneous with the Changhsingian age in the timescale of the ICS. This post-Guadalupian stage is known for high levels of evaporite deposits.
