= Flambeau River (Alaska) =

River in the U.S. state of Alaska

Coordinates: 64.470°N 164.867°W

The Flambeau River is a waterway on the Seward Peninsula in the U.S. state of Alaska. It has a broad, basin-shaped valley, and terminates as a tributary to Safety Sound. Its name was first recorded by Edward Chester Barnard of the United States Geological Survey in 1900. The nearby gold prospect deposit site, "Flambeau River", is named after the waterway.
