= Iditarod Trail =

Long-distance trail

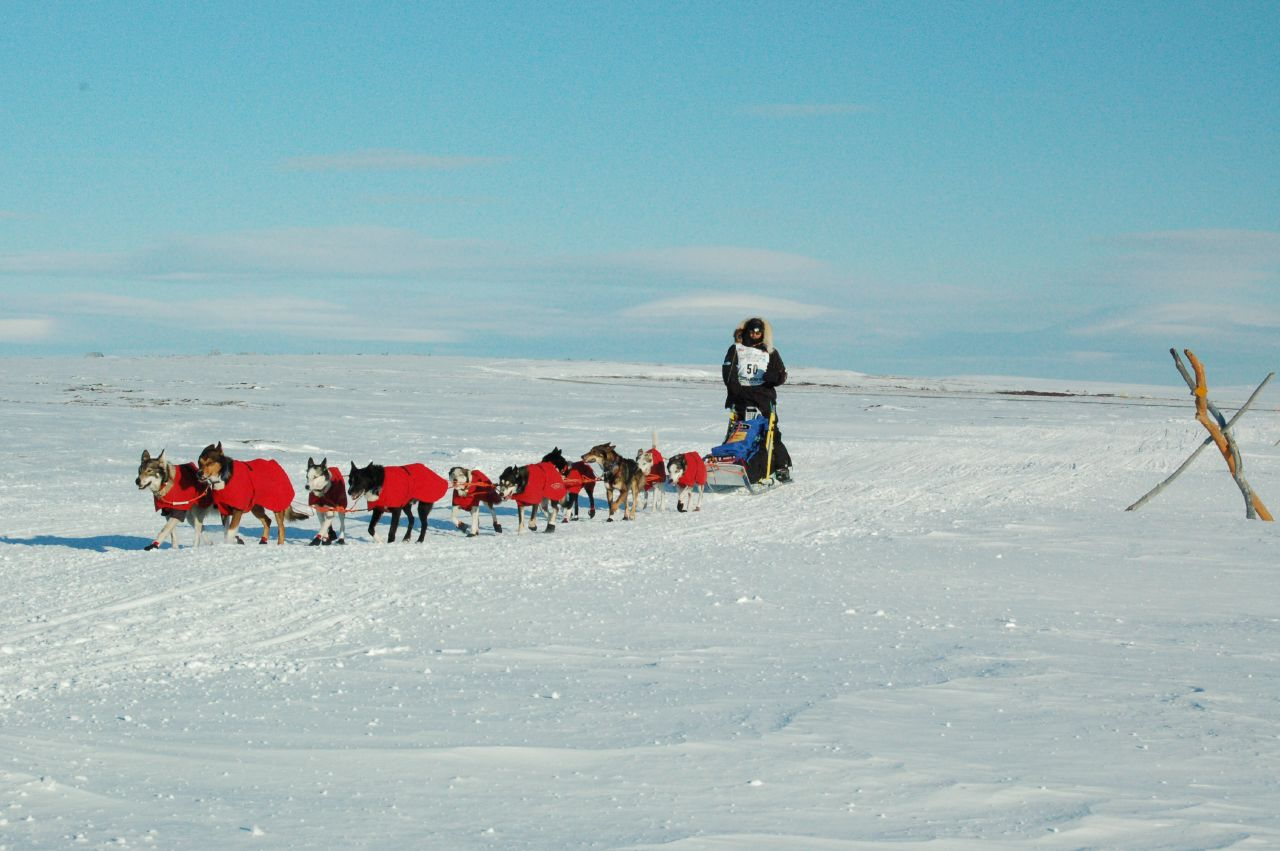
- Robert Sorlie and team near Nome
- Length: 1,600 mi (2,600 km)
- Location: Alaska
- Established: 1973
- Designation: National Historic Trail
- Trailheads: Start: 61.7450°N 150.0511°W; Finish: 64.4981°N 165.4112°W
- Use: Sled dog racing
- Maintained by: Volunteers
- Website: https://www.iditarod.com

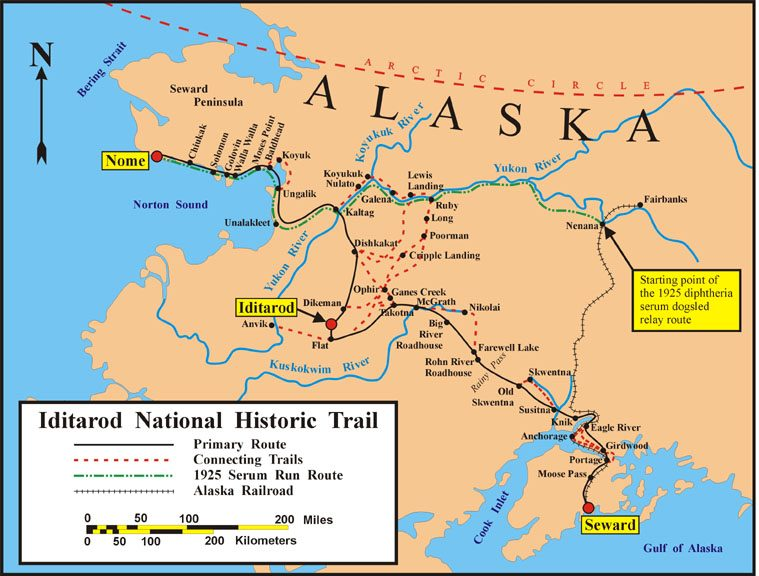
Map of the historical and current Iditarod trails.

The Iditarod Trail, also known historically as the Seward-to-Nome Trail, is a thousand-plus mile (1,600 km) historic and contemporary trail system in the US state of Alaska. The trail began as a composite of trails established by Alaskan native peoples. Its route crossed several mountain ranges and valleys and passed through numerous historical settlements en route from Seward to Nome. The discovery of gold around Nome brought thousands of people over this route beginning in 1908. Roadhouses for people and dog barns sprang up every 20 or so miles. By 1918 World War I and the lack of 'gold fever' resulted in far less travel. The Iditarod Trail Sled Dog Race serves to commemorate part of the gold rush trail and the role dog sleds played in the development of Alaska, and the route and a series of connecting trails have been designated Iditarod National Historic Trail.

== Historic Iditarod Trail ==
The Iditarod Trail was a trail that connected a point 50 miles (80 km) north of Seward, Alaska, where a forerunner of the Alaska Railroad ended, through Iditarod, Alaska and then to Nome. The trail was about 1,150 miles (1,850 km) long. The Iditarod Trail's antecedents were the native trails of the Dena'ina and Deg Hit'an Athabaskan Peoples and the Iñupiat and Yup'ik.

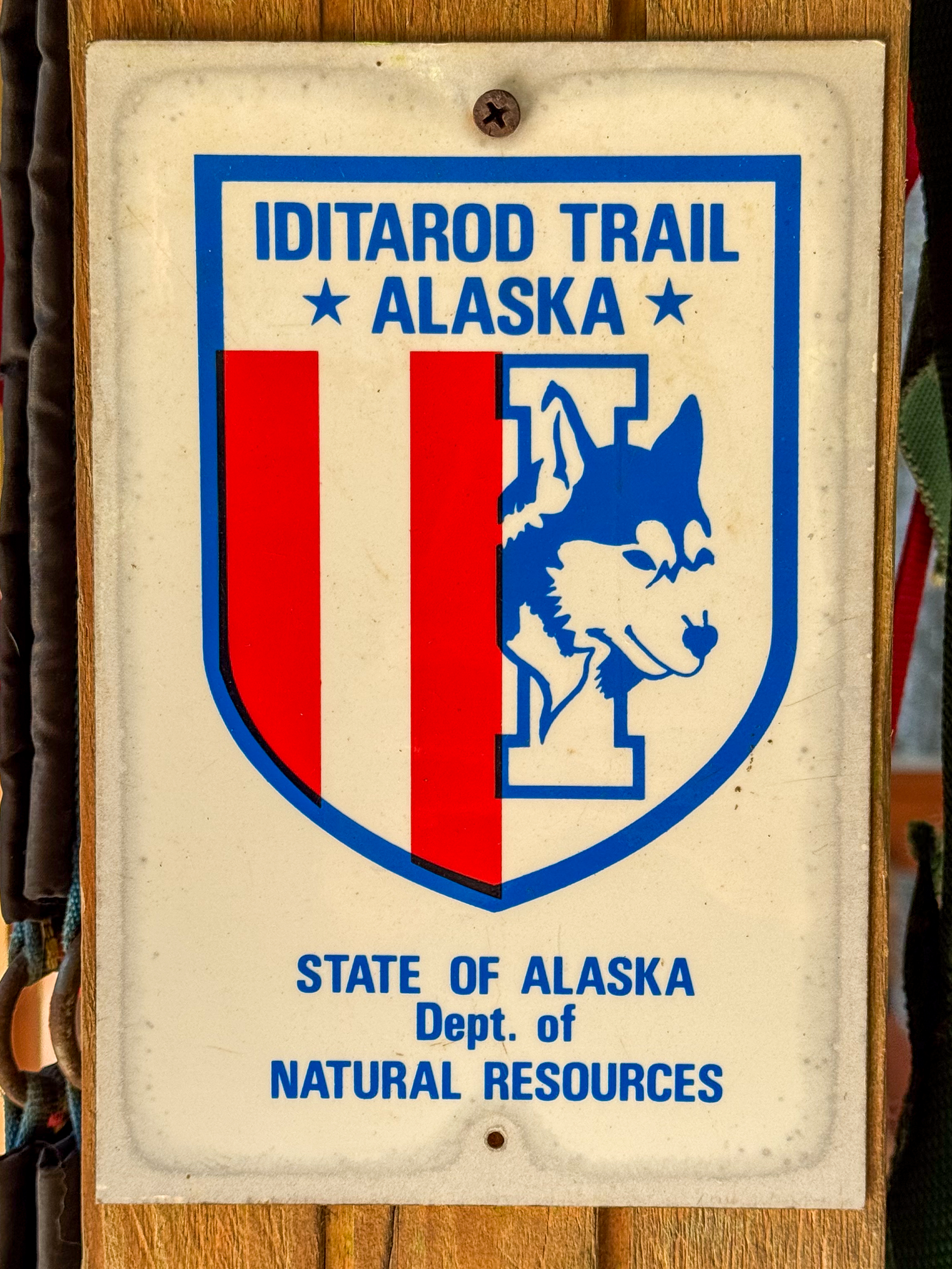
Iditarod Trail sign

From its beginning, the trail wound along Turnagain Arm, over Crow Pass, down the Eagle River Valley and northward to the trading post of Knik, Alaska, the largest town on the Upper Cook Inlet until the railroad town of Anchorage was founded in 1915. The trail then passed west through the valleys of the Susitna River and Yentna River and over the Alaska Range and Rainy Pass. West of the Alaska Range, the trail crossed the Kuskokwim River Valley to the hills west of McGrath and entered the Innoko River mining district and the town of Ophir. After Ophir, the trail went southwest through the Kuskokwim Mountains to Iditarod.

The trail went north from Iditarod through the now abandoned towns of Dikeman and Dishkaket and then northwest to the village of Kaltag. The trail then followed the 90-mile (140 km) long Kaltag Portage, an ancient native trading trail, to Unalakleet, on the Norton Sound. From Unalakleet, the trail coursed north and west around the shore of the Seward Peninsula, passing the villages of Shaktoolik, Koyuk, and Golovin. It then proceeded to its end on Front Street in Nome.

The trail was used during the winter by dog mushers with large freight sleds carrying up to 1,100 pounds (500 kg) of freight.

== History ==
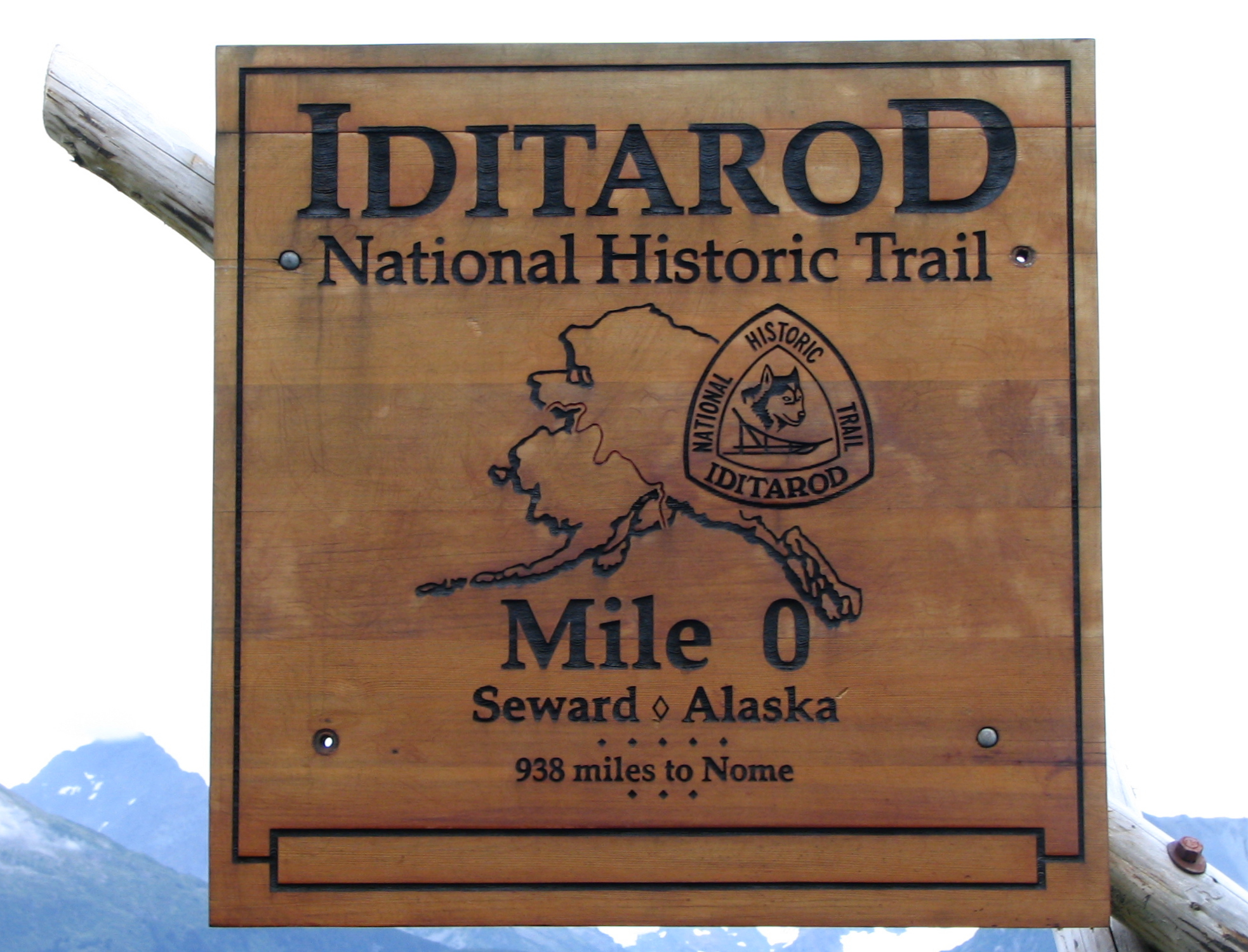
Start of the Iditarod National Historic Trail in Seward, Alaska

When explorers and prospectors arrived in the north, they quickly learned from Native Alaskans that sled dog teams were the only way to reliably move goods and people across the frozen landscape. Not by chance, the "Seward to Nome Trail" as the Iditarod was originally called, was first mapped and marked in 1908 by a four-person Alaska Road Commission crew supported by dog teams.

... having two basket sleds and 18 sets dog harness made ... at Seward we spent five days 'trying out dogs' and repacking the outfit ready for the trip ...

— W.L.Goodwin (1908)

Nine months after the route was surveyed, two prospectors made a 'Christmas Day Strike' in the Iditarod Mining District, and the last great gold rush was on. Between 1910 and 1912, 10,000 gold seekers came to Alaska's "Inland Empire". In the following years they worked $30 million of gold from the ground.

... in the month of March I left for the north. That was many years ago when there were only two modes of travel, mush dogs or just mush.

— Charles Lee Cadwallader

=== Roadhouses and dog barns ===
With the rush, entrepreneurs quickly erected roadhouses and dog barns along the trail at a convenient day's journey apart—about 20 miles—to shelter and feed trail users. Freight shippers, mail haulers and well-to-do passengers relied on dogsleds. Less wealthy foot-travelers used snowshoes, skis, and the occasional bicycle.

Meals were two dollars each, and blankets spread over wild hay on a pole bunk cost another two dollars. High prices for those days, but a cabin in the shadows of Denali is a long way from civilization.

— Harold Penkenpaugh, Nuggets and Beans

By 1918 the stampede reversed itself. New winter mail contracts bypassed the fading town of Iditarod in favor of more direct routes to Nome, and World War I drew young miners and workers away from the gold fields.

The Cape Nome Roadhouse is the last remaining historical roadhouse on the Iditarod Trail and is listed on the National Register of Historic Places.

=== Nome serum run ===
In the winter of 1925, a deadly outbreak of diphtheria struck fear in the hearts of Nome residents. Winter ice had closed the port city from the outside world without enough serum to inoculate its residents. Serum from Anchorage was rushed by train to Nenana and picked up by a sled dog relay. Twenty of Alaska's best mushers and their teams carried the serum 674 miles (1,085 km) from Nenana to Nome in just over 127 hours.

This was to be one of the final great feats by sled dogs. Within a decade, air transport replaced the sled dog team as the preferred way to ship mail. With downturns in gold mining, most of the roadhouses closed, boom towns emptied, and the Iditarod Trail fell into disuse.

=== A partnership effort re-opens the Iditarod Trail ===
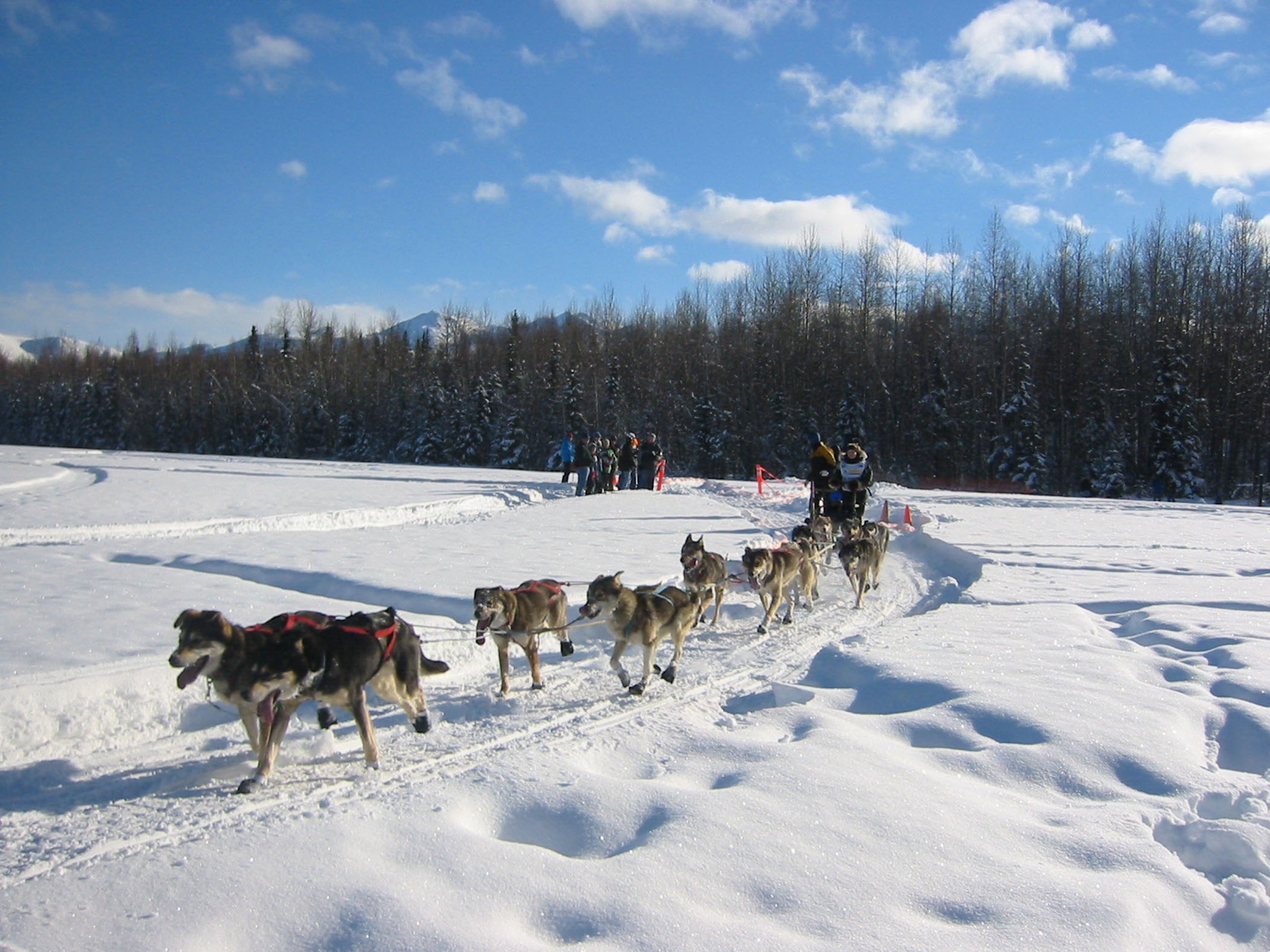
Dogsledder on the Iditarod Trail

Trail work is never done.

— Joe Redington Sr., "father of the Iditarod"

Forest and tundra reclaimed the Iditarod Trail for almost a half a century until Alaskans, Joe Redington Sr., Gleo Huyck, and Tom Johnson, reopened the routes. To draw attention to the role dogs played in Alaska's history, Redington and his friends created an epic sled dog race from Anchorage to Nome. The Iditarod Trail Sled Dog Race ultimately revived dog mushing in Alaska and around the world. After years of effort by Redington and the Alaska Congressional delegation, the Iditarod was designated as a National Historic Trail in 1978.

== Management of the Historic Trail ==
Most of the historic Iditarod Trail is located on public lands managed by the State of Alaska or federal agencies, although some segments pass over private lands. No one entity manages the entire historic trail—management is guided by a cooperative plan adopted by state and federal agencies in the mid-1980s. The federal Bureau of Land Management coordinates cooperative management of the trail and is the primary point of contact for matters involving the entire trail.

Every year local groups, community clubs and individuals contribute time and money to maintain and improve the Iditarod Trail. The statewide non-profit Iditarod National Historic Trail Inc. helps protect and improve the trail and keep the "lore of the trail" alive.

== Iditarod race route ==
The Iditarod Trail Sled Dog Race, named after the now-abandoned town of Iditarod, commemorates the last great gold rush in America to the Iditarod gold fields and the critical role that dogs played in the settlement and development of Alaska. It is a common myth that the race commemorates the dogsled relay known as the 1925 "Serum Run" from Nenana to Nome. The Iditarod Trail Sled Dog Race was first established by Joe Redington Sr. in the early 1973 to encourage the designation of the Iditarod Trail as a National Historic Trail, bring the dying tradition of dog sledding back to the villages of Alaska, and promote the sport of competitive dogsled racing.

Today the race follows much of the primary route of the Iditarod National Historic Trail, with a segment alternating north or south, depending on the year. (These segments are also part of the Iditarod National Historic Trail). Every odd year (i.e., 2011), the race travels the south route from Ophir to Kaltag through the ghost town of Iditarod. On even years, the race travels north from Ophir through Ruby and Galena to Kaltag. The 1925 Serum Run followed 500 miles (800 km) of trail (now designated as the Iditarod National Historic Trail system) between Ruby and Nome. The Iditarod Trail Invitational human powered race for bikers, runners and skiers also follows the Iditarod Trail from Knik to McGrath with a 350-mile race and to Nome in a 1000-mile race. In 2024, Sunny Stroeer of Utah became the first woman to ski the 1,000-mile Iditarod Trail Invitational.
