= Solomon, Alaska =

Unincorporated community in the state of Alaska, United States

Coordinates: 64°33′39″N 164°26′21″W

Solomon, Alaska Aaŋuutaq
- Former mining camp
- Interactive map of Solomon, Alaska
- Country: United States
- State: Alaska
- Census Area: Nome Census Area
- Established: 1900

Government
  - State senator: Donald Olson (D)
  - State rep.: Neal Foster (D)

Population (2010)
  - Total: 0

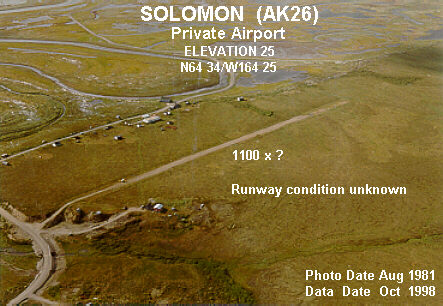
August 1981 aerial view shows the Nome-Council Highway winding around Solomon Airport and houses in the community.

Solomon (Inupiaq: Aaŋuutaq) is an unincorporated community in the Nome Census Area of the Unorganized Borough of Alaska. As of the 2010 census, the population was zero (uninhabited), down from four in 2000.

The Solomon State Field Airport is located near Solomon. The elevation is 23 feet (7.0 m). The nearest town is Nome, Alaska.

== History ==
Solomon was originally settled by the Fish River tribe. It became a mining camp and then a town in the early 1900s. The first post office was established in 1900 under the direction of Postmaster Otto Weihe, an 1899 graduate of the California College of Pharmacy. In 1913, a violent storm destroyed the railroad, along with the rest of the town. The surviving residents were forced to relocate to the recently abandoned Dickson. In 1918, the worldwide influenza epidemic struck Solomon.

== Demographics ==
Historical population
Census	Pop.	Note	%±
1940	106		—
1950	93		−12.3%
1980	4		—
1990	6		50.0%
2000	4		−33.3%
2010	0		−100.0%
U.S. Decennial Census

Solomon first appeared on the 1940 U.S. Census as an unincorporated village. It returned again in 1950, but would not appear afterwards until 1980, when it was designated an Alaskan Native Village Statistical Area (ANVSA). Though reported as uninhabited in 2010, it has a number of private seasonal cabins.

== Area information ==
The school district is the Bering Strait School District in Unalakleet, Alaska. The former settlement of Dickson was directly across the Solomon River on its eastern shore.

Solomon is 30 miles (48 km) east of Nome. The Nome/Council Road goes through Solomon and is the only street. The Solomon State Field Airport is a gravel airstrip that runs charter flights from Nome.

There is a single bed and breakfast in Solomon. It operates during the summer and is used heavily by government survey crews.

== Gallery ==
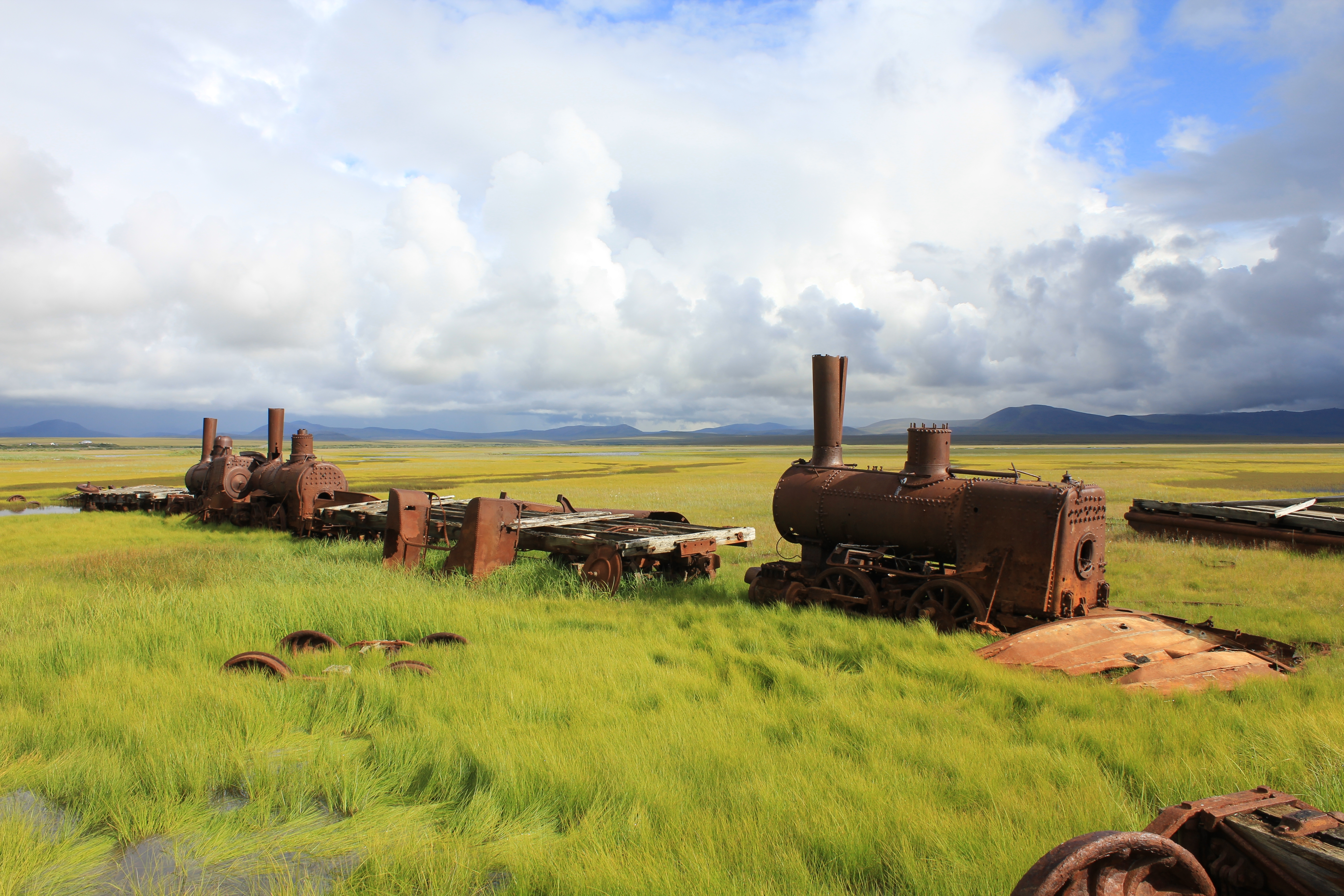
The last train to nowhere, a famous sight along the Nome to Council Road, at the Solomon Bridge at Mile 33.

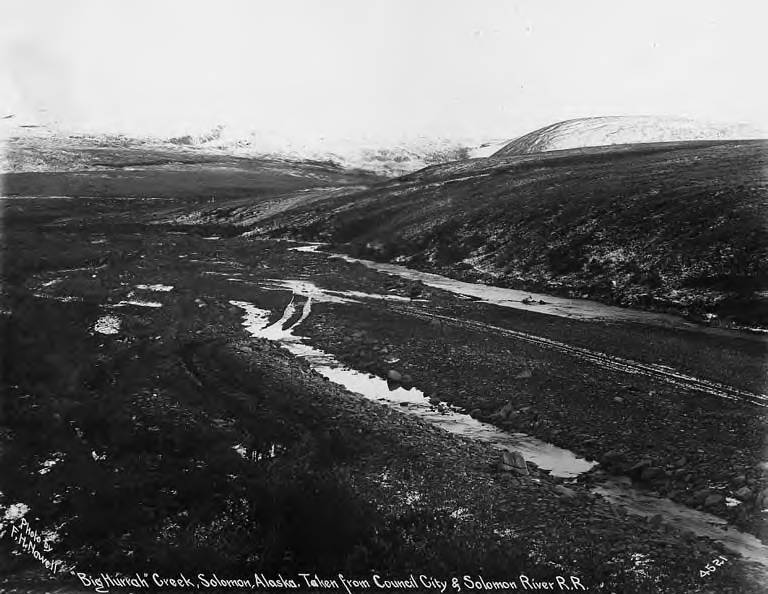
Creek viewed from Council City and Solomon River Railroad

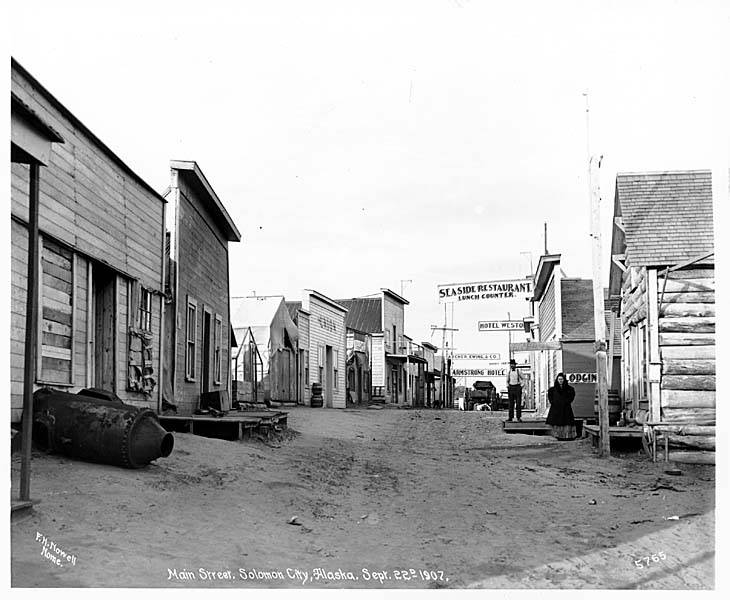
Main Street

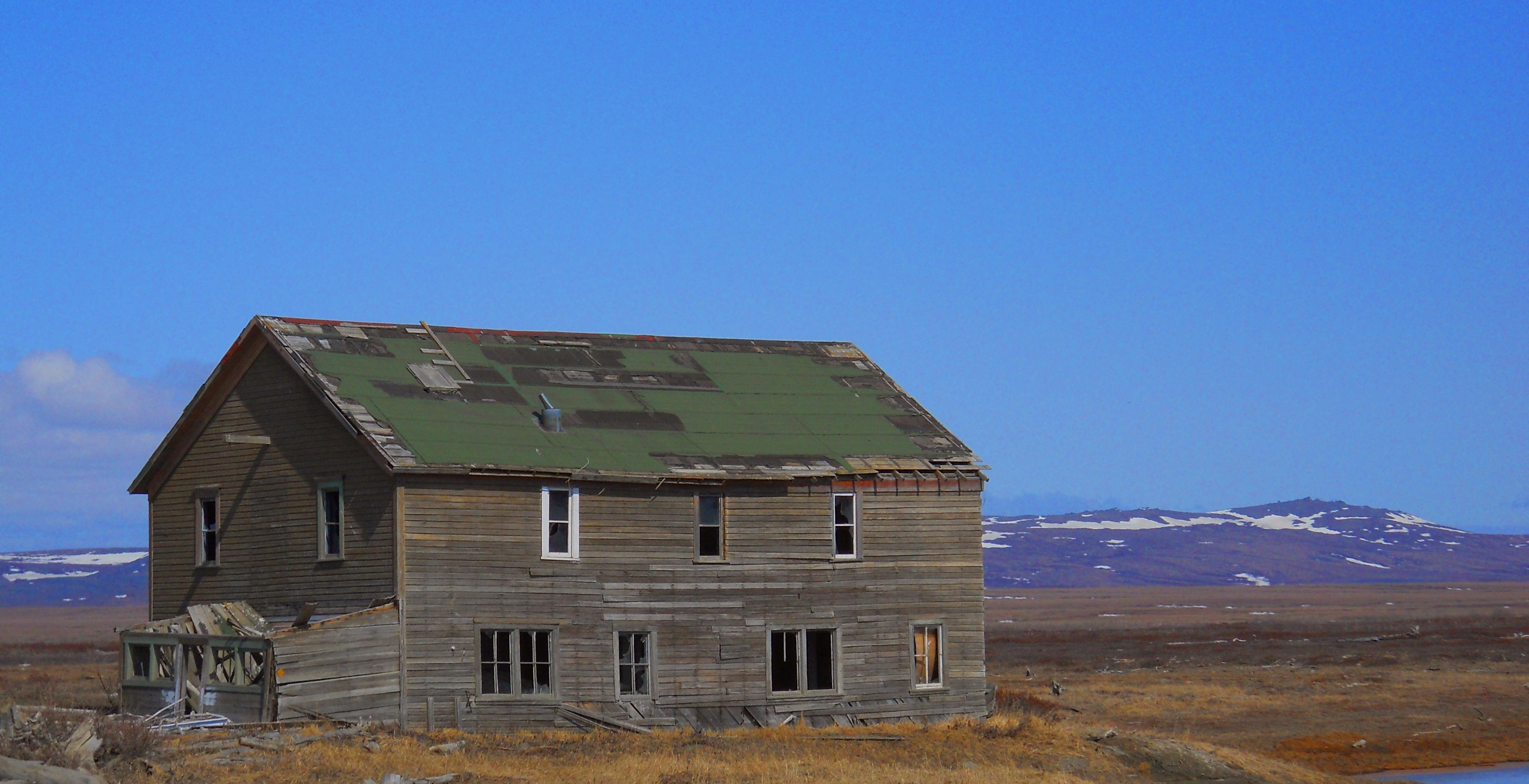
Ol' Man Pete Curran's Store
