= Wien Air Alaska Flight 99 =

1975 aviation accident

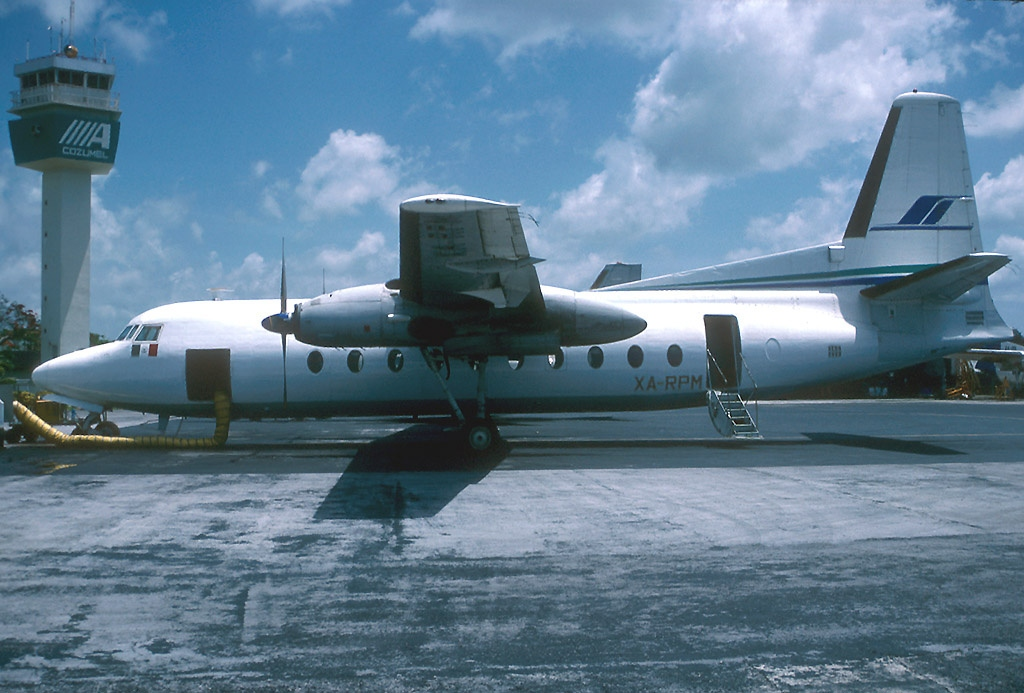
- A Fairchild F-27 similar to the one involved

Accident
- Date: 30 August 1975; 1:57 pm BDT
- Summary: Controlled flight into terrain in fog, pilot error
- Site: Sevuokuk Mountain, near Gambell Airport, Gambell, Alaska, United States; 63°45′54″N 171°42′30″W

Aircraft
- Aircraft type: Fairchild F-27B
- Operator: Wien Air Alaska
- Registration: N4904
- Flight origin: Nome Airport, Nome, Alaska
- 1st stopover: Savoonga Airport, Savoonga, Alaska
- Destination: Gambell Airport, Gambell, Alaska
- Occupants: 32
- Passengers: 28
- Crew: 4
- Fatalities: 10
- Injuries: 22
- Survivors: 22

Wien Air Alaska Flight 99 was a scheduled domestic passenger flight in Alaska to St. Lawrence Island in the Bering Sea. On approach to Gambell on 30 August 1975, it crashed into Sevuokuk Mountain, east of the airport's runway. Of the 32 on board, ten were killed, including the captain and first officer. The Fairchild F-27B aircraft was operated by Wien Air Alaska.

== Flight ==
Flight 99 originated in Nome on Saturday, August 30, 1975, bound for Savoonga and Gambell. Captain William C. Arant (39), who had 6,607 flying hours prior to the journey, and First Officer Gerald W. Schaefer (28) who had 2,738 flight hours were on board. The flight from Nome to Savoonga was uneventful, and the plane departed Savoonga for Gambell at 1:27 pm Bering daylight time. As Gambell did not have a control tower, the Wien agent at Gambell, upon hearing the plane radio its departure from Savoonga, turned on the non-directional beacon at Gambell to aid the flight's crew in navigation.

Fog was prevalent in the Gambell area, and the crew discussed strategies to land at the airport. After several missed approaches, the plane flew north over the community, and turned east, and then south to make one final pass. The plane passed over Troutman Lake east of Gambell, and turned south, before impacting Sevuokuk Mountain at an elevation of 424 feet (130 m).

After impact, the plane broke apart and was propelled up the mountain approximately 132 feet (40 m), coming to rest inverted. A fire broke out, and the residents of the village came to aid, attempting to put the fire out with hand-held extinguishers. All but one of the injured passengers were able to escape the wreckage. Most of the injured or killed passengers were natives of Nome, Gambell, or Savoonga.

== Cause ==
The cause of the crash, according to the NTSB, was improper IFR (Instrument flight rules) operation, failing to adhere to instrument approach procedures. The airplane collided with a mountain on a missed approach to landing, after multiple missed approaches. The weather at the airport was unsafe for landing, with a low ceiling and sea fog.
