= Annie Aghnaqa (Akeya) Alowa =

Yup'ik elder and environmental activist

Annie Aghnaqa (Akeya) Alowa (née Akeya; also known as Aghnaqa (Annie Akeya Alowa) and Annie Alowa; 25 June 1924 - 19 February 1999) was a Yup'ik elder and Alaskan environmental activist, healer, and leader in health and justice advocacy for indigenous peoples. She was inducted into the Alaska Women's Hall of Fame in 2016.

This [military contamination] is a clear case of trespass ... We know what is going on here. We are not a bunch of dumb Eskimos. I will fight until I melt. (A. Alowa)

== Early life ==
Annie (Akeya) Alowa was born in 1924, in Savoonga on St. Lawrence Island. Savoonga was a Yup'ik village forty miles from Russia on the northern Bering Sea. She is the daughter of Horst and Olga Akeya and had eight siblings; Agatha Mokiyuk (née Akeya), Barbara Kogassagoon (née Akeya), Helen Kiyukhook (née Akeya), Lila Akeya, Sarah Tate (née Akeya), Alexander Akeya, Calvin Akeya, and David Akeya.

== Marriage and family ==
Alowa's first marriage, in 1944, to Jackson ended with his death the following year. In 1945, Annie remarried. Her husband was Nelson Alowa. Together they had eight children- Christina, Jeannette, Julius, Richard, Roland, Rose, Sheldon, and Timothy. Summers were spent at Tamniq, a camp where the family hunted and trapped. Alowa developed well-known skills as a traditional skin sewer and doll making artist. She enjoyed sewing and picking berries for a pastime.

Alowa also knew the importance of education for herself and her children. Alowa's children always had to take their school work to Tamniq, where she taught them as they continued their education. Alowa continued her own education. From 1955 to 1956, Alowa was trained by healer Harriet Penayah, also from Savoonga, in midwifery. Her first training at a hospital was in Kotzebue, Alaska.

== Later life ==
A U.S. military Air Force base was started in 1952 on St Lawrence Island at Northeast Cape. From 1963 to 1970, Alowa was employed by the Air Force. She also volunteered as a health aide during this time, receiving no payment or benefits. In her career, she was a health aid, both as a traditional healer and as a Village Health Aide, for 13 years. In 1971, her medical training continued with the Norton Sound Health Corporation in Nome. It was here that she was trained as a health aide in the Community Health Aide Program (CHAP). Before telephone services reached St. Lawrence Island, health aides and village healers worked on their own knowledge and training as midwives and first responders, including tuberculosis and injuries. Later, however with telephone service installed, support was available through communication with physicians in Nome. In 1972, the U.S. military left their base in Northeast Cape. When they left, they left much waste and toxins. Over the next three decades, Alowa noticed the health problems which she suspected were associated the hazardous material wastes from the military base. Cancer occurred in several people for the first time, as well as increases in miscarriages and low-birth weight infants. There was also an increase in animal deaths from eating plants with toxins from the waste. And there was an incident were several reindeer died as a result of being trapped because of the military waste. Alowa continually sought government assistance and hearings to advocate for cleanup of the base on the island, but with no success until 1997 when she met Pamela Miller. Alowa and Miller worked together until Alowa's death two years later. In 1997 they were sent by Greenpeace to investigate the site and get photographic evidence and environmental samples. Miller founded the Alaska Community Action on Toxics (ACAT) in 1998, which enable them to meet with Colonel Sheldon Jahn of the Army Corps of Engineers in Alaska to ask for him to clean up the site. However, he was defensive and dismissed Alowa. She kept raising awareness to the issue and raised Northeast Cape to the top of the prioritized cleanup list and by 2016 the Corps had spent $123 million on cleanup. Alowa did several interviews and made trips to Anchorage to advocate for environmental justice in Northeastern Cape, including a conference in December 1998 with Alaska's Women Environmental Network (AWEN).

== Death and legacy ==
Alowa died of liver cancer, that may have been caused from the hunting and fishing in the area affected by the military bases toxins in Northeast Cape. She had also had breast cancer. She died on 19 February 1999 at the age of 74, but she kept fighting for her community until her end. In the spring of that year, filmmaker Jean Riordan created a documentary of Alowa's interviews named with her quote, "I Will Fight Until I Melt (whanga pillugaghlleqaqa kenlanga ughullemnun)". It includes "footage of the island, its people, and the Northeast Cape dumping ground". Alowa was inducted into the Alaska Women's Hall of Fame in 2016 due to her large involvement of the environmental and health care in St. Lawrence Island. She advocated for 20+ years for the cleanup of the waste site, and $123 million was spent on cleanup so far. Many people, including those too young to have known her, are encouraged by her work and continue to strive for justice and human rights, remember all the work Annie Alowa did. Although she was soft-spoken, she was persistent and eloquent and had a purpose. She, with her spiritual faith, has left a legacy and will continue to impact people from her community.
