= Gambell School =

School in Gambell, Alaska, United States

Coordinates: 63°46′36″N 171°42′55″W

Gambell School, also known as the Hugo T. Apatiki School, is a K-12 school in Gambell, Alaska. It is a part of the Bering Strait School District.

The campus of the Gambell School includes one prefabricated building with a gymnasium and two classroom wings.

== History ==
As of 2013 it had about 200 students. By 2013 the school received a $1 million grant from the federal government's School Improvement Grant (SIG).

== Curriculum ==
As of 2013 the curriculum heavily emphasizes mathematics and reading due to influences from the SIG grant, with daily emphasis on each taking up two blocks. As of that year it uses the "Success for All" teaching program and other programs used to raise test scores.

== Teaching staff ==
As of 2013 the administrative staff and the head teachers were White Americans; a lack of local Alaska natives with university educations meant that the school district recruited staff from the Lower 48. Each class had a teacher's aide who was Yupik.

== Culture ==
The school owns trophy cases housing Alaska Native artifacts including artwork, carving, clothing, and tools.
