= Bering Strait School District =

School district in northwestern Alaska, United States

Address
- Po Box 225 Unalakleet, Alaska; United States

District information
- Schools: 15
- NCES District ID: 0200020

Students and staff
- Students: 1745
- Teachers: 161.5 FTE
- Staff: 308.4 FTE
- Student–teacher ratio: 10.80

Other information
- Website: www.bssd.org

Bering Strait School District (BSSD) is a school district in northwestern Alaska, United States, serving approximately 1,700 students in grades K-12 in fifteen isolated villages. All schools in the district serve students of all ages, and most classrooms are multi-age.

The district headquarters are in Unalakleet, Alaska.

== Communities ==
The student population is roughly 98% Alaska Native, including Yup'ik, Siberian Yupik, and Inupiat. Travel between villages is by air; the nearest road connection to the outside world is almost 300 miles (480 km) east to the district office in Unalakleet.

The communities in the district are traditional Inuit and Yupik villages which rely on subsistence activities such as hunting marine mammals and migratory birds, and gathering berries. Native dance and traditional crafts such as walrus ivory carving are still strong. At least four villages practice traditional whaling. There are few cash economy jobs, and the school is often the largest employer in each village.

Russia is visible from four district schools with the naked eye, most notably from Diomede School located on the island of Little Diomede, where it is only 1.5 miles (2.4 km) from the International Date Line.

The route of the Iditarod Trail Sled Dog Race runs through six district villages, where it is a major event. Many current and former Iditarod mushers live in the district, and participate in school activities focusing on the history and cultural traditions of mushing.

== Schools ==
- Anthony A. Andrews School (St. Michael)
- Aniguiin School (Elim)
- Brevig Mission School (Brevig Mission)
- Diomede School (Diomede)
- Gambell School (Gambell)
- Hogarth Kingeekuk Memorial School (Savoonga)
- James C. Isabell School (Teller)
- Koyuk-Malemute School (Koyuk)
- Martin L. Olson School (Golovin)
- Shaktoolik School (Shaktoolik)
- Shishmaref School (Shishmaref)
- Tukurngailnguq School (Stebbins)
- Unalakleet School (Unalakleet)
- Wales School (Wales)
- White Mountain School (White Mountain)
