= Hogarth Kingeekuk Sr. Memorial School =

School in Alaska

Coordinates: 63°41′47″N 170°28′35″W

Information
- School district: Bering Strait School District
- NCES District ID: 0200020
- Grades: K-12
- Enrollment: 234 (2023-2024)

Hogarth Kingeekuk Sr. Memorial School or Savoonga School is a K-12 school in Savoonga, Alaska. It is a part of the Bering Strait School District.

The school serves as a community center for Savoonga residents. ECI/Hyer Architecture and Interiors built the current school facility, which has asymmetrical trusses and covered entry and exit porches that use Alaska Native-style poles. The building won the merit award from the American Institute of Architects (AIA) Alaska chapter.

By 2013 the school received a $1 million grant from the federal government's School Improvement Grant (SIG).

== Curriculum ==
As of 2013 the curriculum heavily emphasizes mathematics and reading due to influences from the SIG grant, with daily emphasis on each taking up two blocks. As of that year it uses the "Success for All" teaching program and other programs used to raise test scores. The school previously taught a class on Yupik culture and Yupik language but a lack of students enrolling in the class was one reason for its cancellation.

== Academic performance ==
In 2003 9% of the students were proficient in Alaska state reading tests. By 2011 this increased to 29%.

From 2003 to 2013 the attendance rate declined; many students who needed to work to support the families felt stymied by an increase in the school year and school day that was mandated by the federal government. As of 2013 the attendance rate was 85%. Rates of students graduating from school decreased during the same period.

== Teaching staff ==
As of 2013 the administrative staff and the head teachers were White Americans; a lack of local Alaska natives with university educations meant that the school district recruited staff from the Lower 48. Each class had a teacher's aide who was Yupik.
