= Gambell, Alaska =

Gambell Sivuqaq (Central Siberian Yupik)
- City
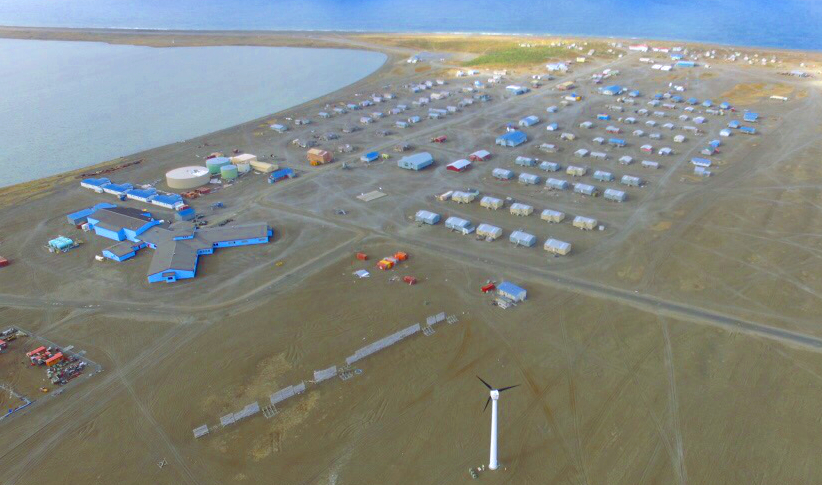
- Aerial view of Gambell in 2017

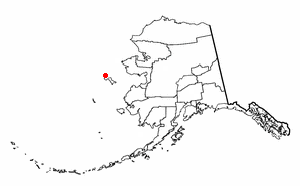
- Location of Gambell, Alaska
- Coordinates: 63°46′34″N 171°42′03″W
- Country: United States
- State: Alaska
- Census Area: Nome
- Incorporated: December 12, 1963

Government
  - Mayor: Howard Tungiyan
  - State senator: Donny Olson (D)
  - State rep.: Neal Foster (D)

Area
  - Total: 28.42 sq mi (73.61 km^{2})
  - Land: 10.51 sq mi (27.21 km^{2})
  - Water: 17.92 sq mi (46.40 km^{2})
- Elevation: 0 ft (0 m)

Population (2020)
  - Total: 640
  - Density: 60.9/sq mi (23.52/km^{2})
- Time zone: UTC-9 (Alaska (AKST))
  - Summer (DST): UTC-8 (AKDT)
- ZIP code: 99742
- Area code: 907
- FIPS code: 02-27640
- GNIS feature ID: 1402463, 2419389

Gambell (/ˈɡæm.bəl/ GAM-bəl) (Central Siberian Yupik: Sivuqaq) is a city in the Nome Census Area of the U.S. state of Alaska. Located on St. Lawrence Island, it had a population of 640 at the 2020 census, down from 681 in 2010.

== History ==
Sivuqaq is the Yupik language name for St. Lawrence Island and for Gambell. It has also been called Chibuchack and Sevuokok.

St. Lawrence Island has been inhabited sporadically for the past 2,000 years by both Alaskan Yup'ik and Siberian Yupik people. In the 18th and 19th centuries, the island had a population of about 4,000.

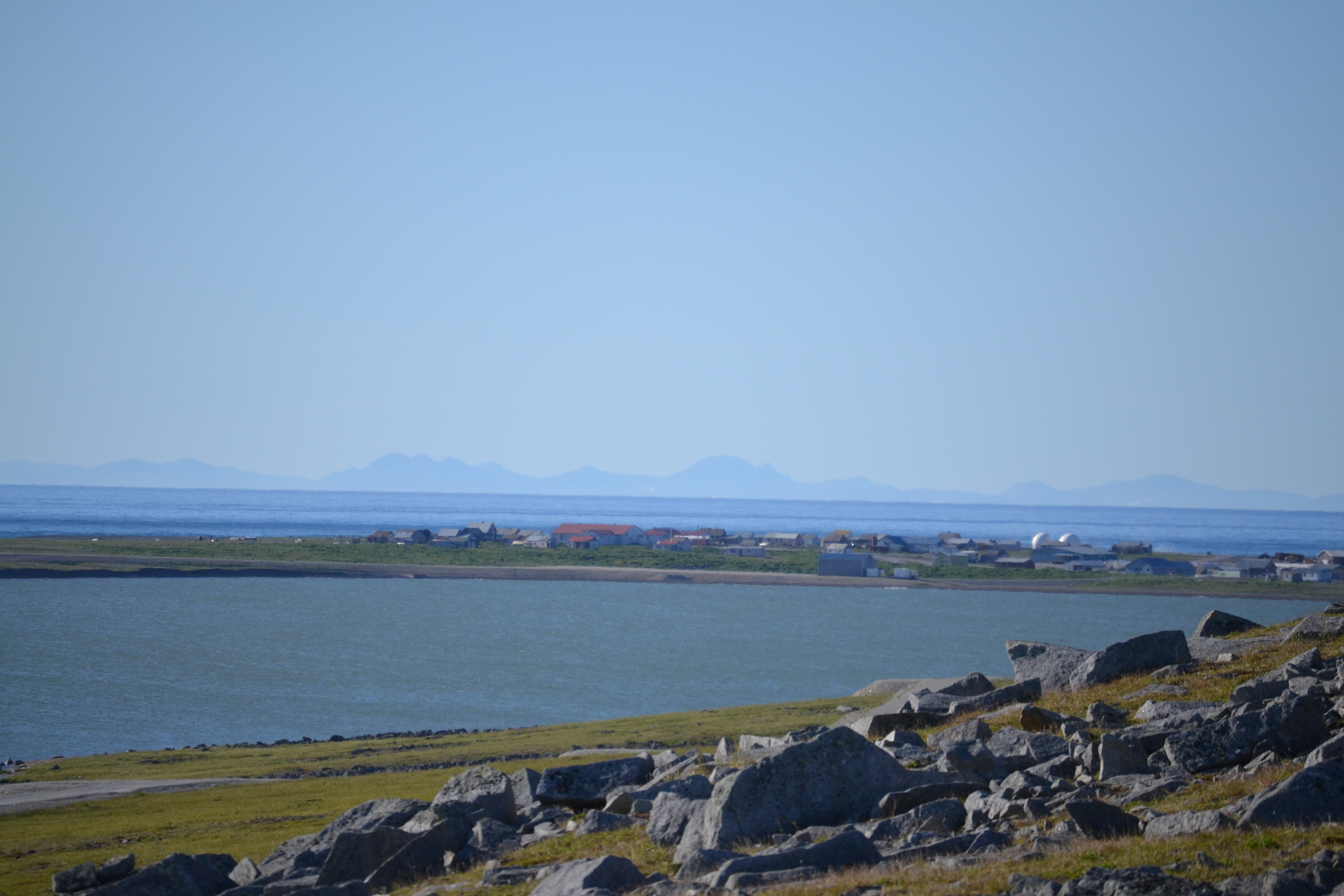
The village of Gambell in the summer, with Troutman Lake in the foreground, and the mountains of Chukotka in the background.

Between 1878 and 1880 a famine decimated the island's population. Many who did not starve left. The remaining population of St. Lawrence Island was nearly all Siberian Yupik.

In 1887, the Reformed Episcopal Church of America opened a mission on St. Lawrence Island. That year, a carpenter, lumber and tools were left at Sivuqaq by a ship. The carpenter worked with local Yupik to build a wood building, the first they had ever seen. When the building was finished, the carpenter left the keys to the door with a local chief and departed. Since the carpenter had not spoken Siberian Yupik, the residents did not know the purpose of the building.

The Reformed Episcopal Church had not been able to find missionaries willing to live on St. Lawrence Island, so the building built for the mission was left unoccupied. In 1890, the building was acquired by Sheldon Jackson. He spoke to the Reverend Vene and Nellie Gambell, of Wapello, Iowa, about moving to St. Lawrence Island. Gambell was hired as a schoolteacher and the Gambells came to the island in 1894. They had a daughter in 1897. Nellie Gambell became ill and the Gambells spent the winter of 1897–1898 in the United States, where Nellie was hospitalized. In the spring of 1898, on the return journey to St. Lawrence Island, their ship sank in a storm and 37 people on it drowned, including the Gambells and their daughter. After their death, Sivuqaq was renamed in the Gambells' honor.

On June 22, 1955, during the Cold War, a US Navy P2V Neptune with a crew of 11 was attacked by two Soviet fighters in international waters over the Bering Straits between Siberia and Alaska, and crashed near Gambell. Locals from Gambell rescued the crew, 3 of whom were wounded by Soviet fire, and 4 of whom were injured in the crash. The Soviet government, in response to a US diplomatic protest, was unusually conciliatory, stating:

There was an exchange of shots after a Soviet fighter advised the US plane that it was over Soviet territory and should leave (the US denied that the US plane fired at all). The incident took place under heavy cloud cover and poor visibility, although the alleged violation of Soviet airspace could be the responsibility of US commanders not interested in preventing such violations.

The Soviet military was under strict orders to "avoid any action beyond the limits of the Soviet state frontiers."

The Soviet government "expressed regret in regard to the incident", adding that "taking into account... conditions which do not exclude the possibility of a mistake from one side or the other," it was willing to compensate the US for 50% of damages sustained—the first such offer ever made by the Soviets for any Cold War shootdown incident. The US government said it was satisfied with the Soviet expression of regret and the offer of partial compensation, although it said that the Soviet statement fell short of what the available information indicated.

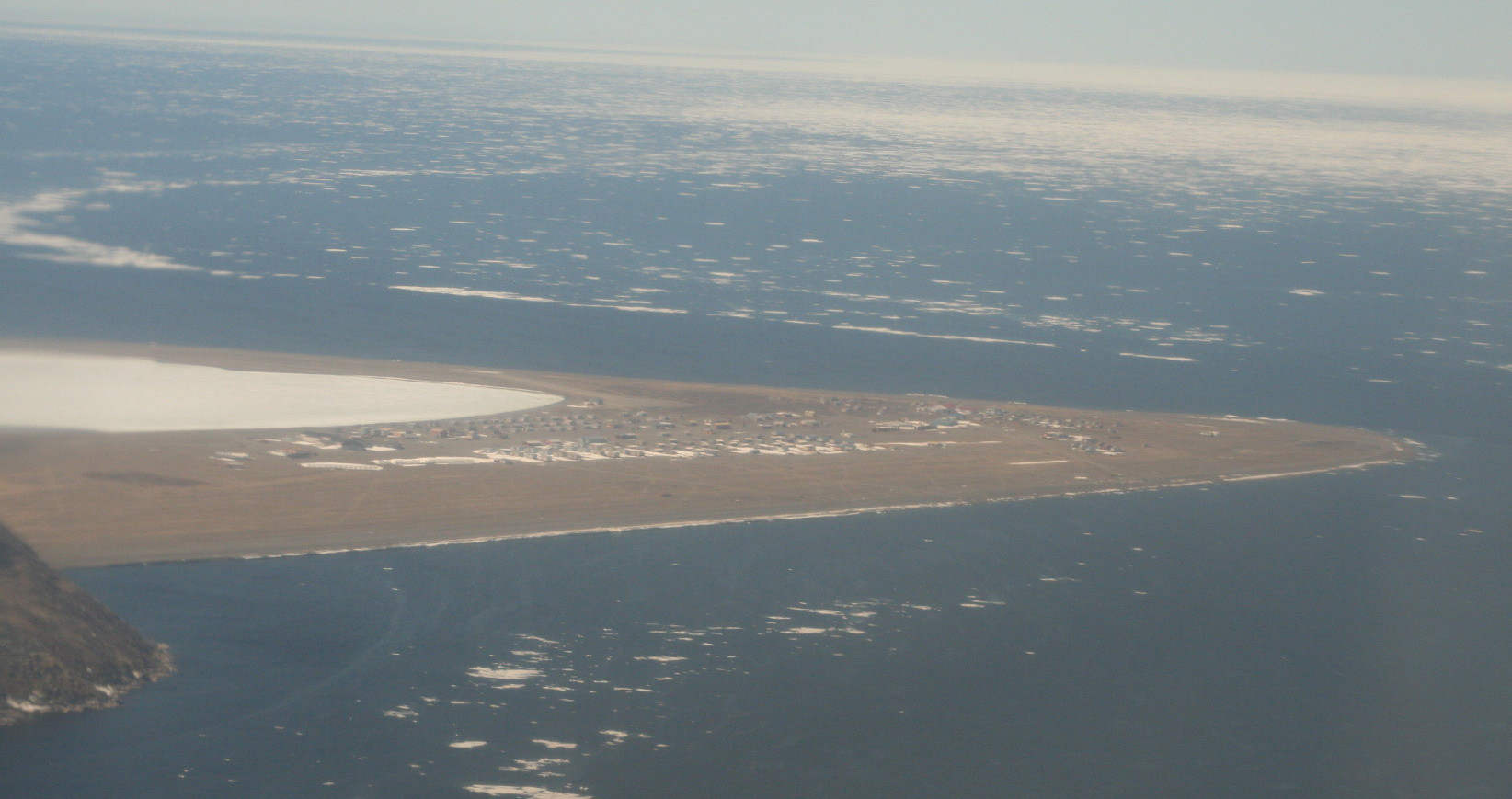
Gambell in 2016

Gambell and Savoonga received joint title to most of St. Lawrence Island under the Alaska Native Claims Settlement Act of 1971.

The Gambell incident occurred on February 27, 1974, when a Soviet Antonov An-24LR "Toros" (CCCP-47195) ice reconnaissance aircraft landed at Gambell.

On August 30, 1975, Wien Air Alaska Flight 99 crashed when trying to land in Gambell. 10 of the 32 passengers and crew on board were killed.

In October 2022, two Russian citizens arrived in Gambell by small boat and sought political asylum, saying they wanted to avoid compulsory military service during the Russian invasion of Ukraine. It was an unusual and dangerous trip; Alaska Governor Mike Dunleavy said he did not expect a continual stream of other arrivals. US Senator for Alaska Lisa Murkowski later revealed that the two refugees were members of a group indigenous to Siberia.

== Geography ==
Gambell is on the northwest cape of St. Lawrence Island in the Bering Sea, 325 km (202 mi) southwest of Nome. It is 58 km (36 mi) from the Chukchi Peninsula in the Russian Far East.

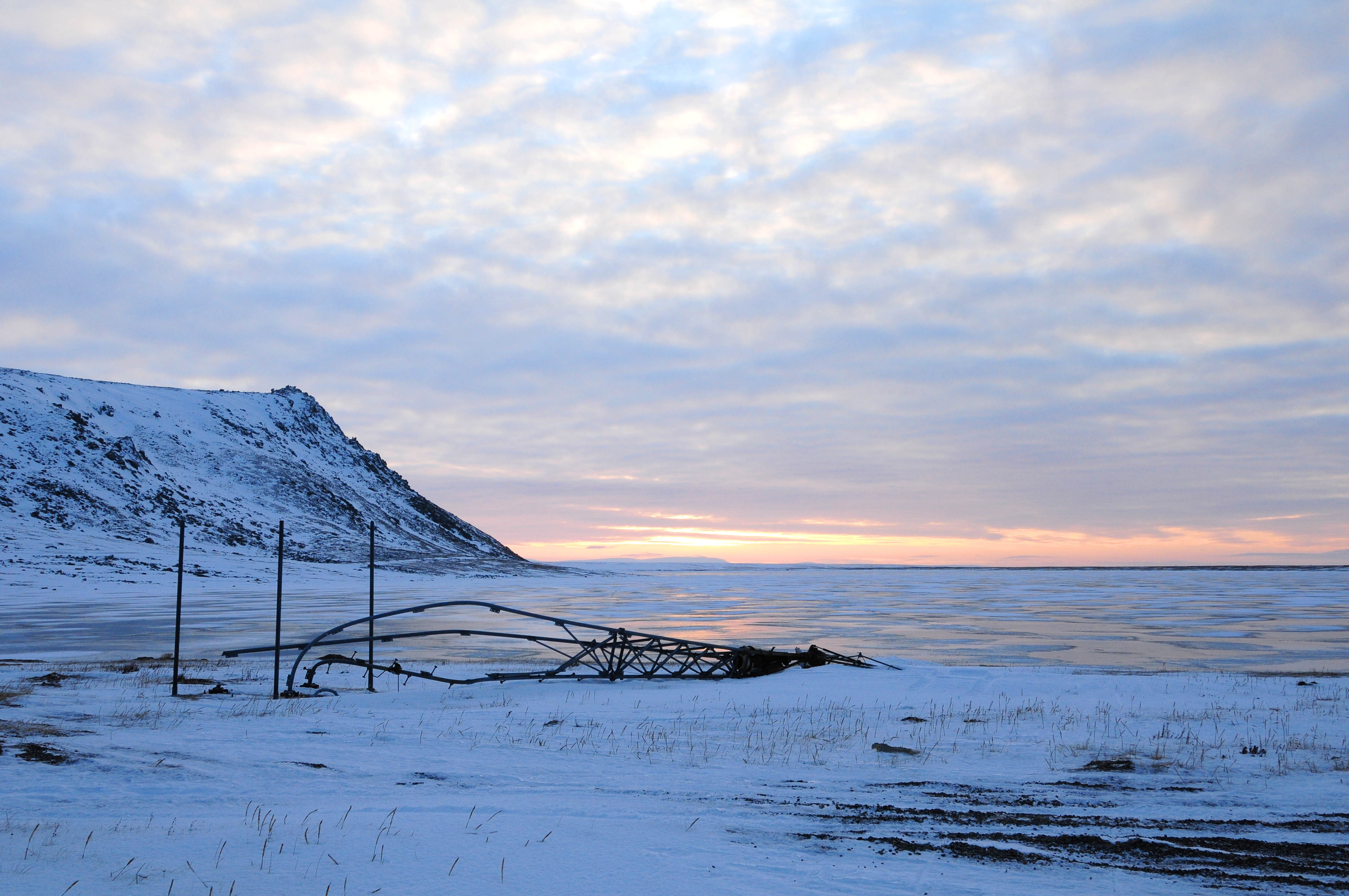

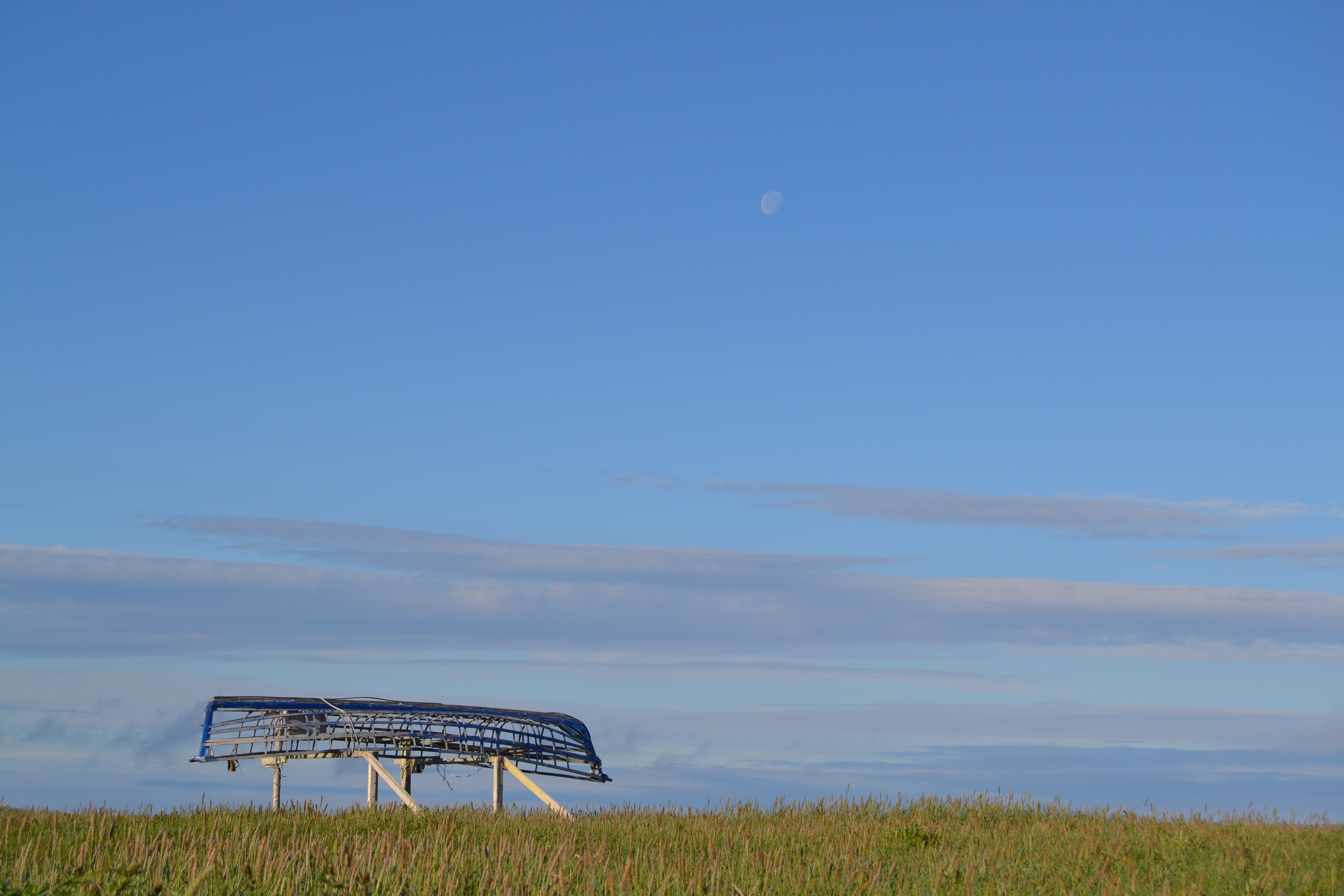
Frame of traditional Yupik skin boat above the west beach of Gambell, Alaska.

According to the United States Census Bureau, the city has an area of 30.4 square miles (79 km^{2}), of which 10.9 square miles (28 km^{2}) is land and 19.5 square miles (51 km^{2}) (64.10%) is water.

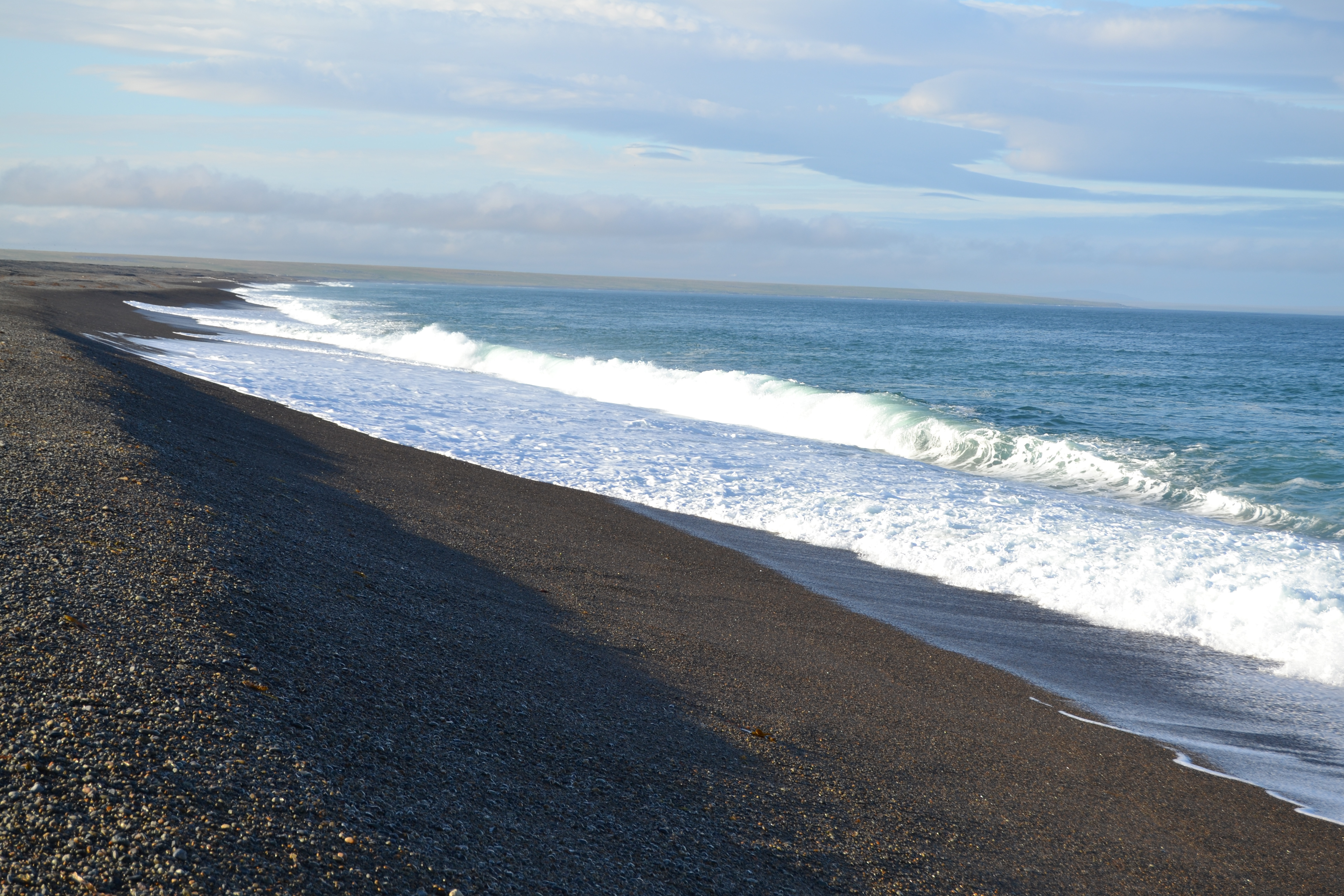
West beach of Gambell, Alaska, facing south.

The town is served by Gambell Airport.

=== Climate ===
Owing to the influence of the cold Bering Sea, Gambell has a polar climate (Köppen ET). Its hottest month averages cooler than 50 °F or 10 °C. The climate features long, frigid and snowy winters alongside short cool summers. The cold sea creates pronounced seasonal lag, sufficient that April averages colder than December and May colder than October.

Compared to most northern hemisphere polar climates, Gambell is relatively moderate, featuring only discontinuous permafrost and despite the freezing of the Bering Sea less frigid winters than typical for Asia and North America at similar latitudes. As an example, Iqaluit on the other side of North America averages 9.8 °F or 5.4 °C colder over the year at a similar latitude, and Arviat on northern Hudson Bay 12 °F or 6.7 °C colder despite being two degrees farther south.

Climate data for Gambell (1961–1990 normals, extremes 1936–1988)
Month	Jan	Feb	Mar	Apr	May	Jun	Jul	Aug	Sep	Oct	Nov	Dec	Year
Record high °F (°C)	39 (4)	41 (5)	36 (2)	45 (7)	54 (12)	64 (18)	71 (22)	68 (20)	62 (17)	53 (12)	54 (12)	42 (6)	71 (22)
Mean maximum °F (°C)	30.2 (−1.0)	25.0 (−3.9)	30.0 (−1.1)	32.3 (0.2)	43.9 (6.6)	54.5 (12.5)	62.9 (17.2)	58.1 (14.5)	50.9 (10.5)	41.7 (5.4)	35.6 (2.0)	34.3 (1.3)	63.7 (17.6)
Mean daily maximum °F (°C)	11.6 (−11.3)	6.4 (−14.2)	9.8 (−12.3)	18.9 (−7.3)	33.6 (0.9)	44.0 (6.7)	50.7 (10.4)	49.7 (9.8)	43.5 (6.4)	33.7 (0.9)	24.8 (−4.0)	18.6 (−7.4)	28.9 (−1.7)
Daily mean °F (°C)	7.1 (−13.8)	1.4 (−17.0)	5.4 (−14.8)	13.2 (−10.4)	29.6 (−1.3)	39.1 (3.9)	46.5 (8.1)	46.1 (7.8)	40.4 (4.7)	30.7 (−0.7)	22.8 (−5.1)	15.6 (−9.1)	25.9 (−3.4)
Mean daily minimum °F (°C)	3.7 (−15.7)	−1.4 (−18.6)	0.7 (−17.4)	8.8 (−12.9)	25.2 (−3.8)	34.2 (1.2)	41.5 (5.3)	41.7 (5.4)	36.6 (2.6)	28.2 (−2.1)	19.1 (−7.2)	11.5 (−11.4)	20.9 (−6.2)
Mean minimum °F (°C)	−13.7 (−25.4)	−17.3 (−27.4)	−13.2 (−25.1)	−7.3 (−21.8)	14.9 (−9.5)	28.2 (−2.1)	35.6 (2.0)	35.1 (1.7)	28.7 (−1.8)	18.7 (−7.4)	4.7 (−15.2)	−6.8 (−21.6)	−19.7 (−28.7)
Record low °F (°C)	−24 (−31)	−26 (−32)	−26 (−32)	−20 (−29)	2 (−17)	21 (−6)	30 (−1)	30 (−1)	24 (−4)	13 (−11)	−7 (−22)	−20 (−29)	−26 (−32)
Average precipitation inches (mm)	0.89 (23)	0.79 (20)	1.04 (26)	0.71 (18)	0.88 (22)	0.66 (17)	0.92 (23)	1.87 (47)	1.52 (39)	1.52 (39)	1.53 (39)	1.79 (45)	14.12 (359)
Average snowfall inches (cm)	2.3 (5.8)	3.0 (7.6)	1.2 (3.0)	5.4 (14)	3.3 (8.4)	0.1 (0.25)	0.0 (0.0)	0.0 (0.0)	0.3 (0.76)	2.2 (5.6)	4.2 (11)	4.0 (10)	26.0 (66)
Average precipitation days (≥ 0.01 inch)	8.0	6.3	4.7	8.5	5.4	4.0	6.7	10.3	11.0	11.2	11.3	15.3	102.7
Average snowy days (≥ 0.01 inch)	5.3	5.8	2.8	7.5	3.6	0.3	0.0	0.0	0.1	2.7	8.1	10.2	46.4
Source 1: Western Regional Climate Center
Source 2: XMACIS (snowfall)

== Demographics ==
Historical population
Census	Pop.	Note	%±
1910	221		—
1920	48		−78.3%
1930	250		420.8%
1940	296		18.4%
1950	309		4.4%
1960	358		15.9%
1970	372		3.9%
1980	445		19.6%
1990	525		18.0%
2000	649		23.6%
2010	681		4.9%
2020	640		−6.0%
U.S. Decennial Census 2020

Gambell first appeared on the 1910 U.S. Census as an unincorporated village. It was formally incorporated in 1963.

=== Racial and ethnic composition ===
Note: the US Census treats Hispanic/Latino as an ethnic category. This table excludes Latinos from the racial categories and assigns them to a separate category. Hispanics/Latinos may be of any race.

Race / Ethnicity (NH = Non-Hispanic)	Pop 2000	Pop 2010	Pop 2020	% 2000	% 2010	% 2020
White alone (NH)	23	25	19	3.54%	3.67%	2.97%
Black or African American alone (NH)	0	0	1	0.00%	0.00%	0.16%
Native American or Alaska Native alone (NH)	619	649	614	95.38%	95.30%	95.94%
Asian alone (NH)	3	1	1	0.46%	0.15%	0.16%
Native Hawaiian or Pacific Islander alone (NH)	0	0	0	0.00%	0.00%	0.00%
Other race alone (NH)	0	0	0	0.00%	0.00%	0.00%
Mixed race or Multiracial (NH)	2	3	1	0.31%	0.44%	0.16%
Hispanic or Latino (any race)	2	3	4	0.31%	0.44%	0.63%
Total	649	681	640	100.00%	100.00%	100.00%

=== 2020 census ===
As of the 2020 census, Gambell had a population of 640. The median age was 28.2 years. 30.6% of residents were under the age of 18 and 8.6% of residents were 65 years of age or older. For every 100 females there were 109.2 males, and for every 100 females age 18 and over there were 119.8 males age 18 and over.

0.0% of residents lived in urban areas, while 100.0% lived in rural areas.

There were 171 households in Gambell, of which 48.0% had children under the age of 18 living in them. Of all households, 32.7% were married-couple households, 32.7% were households with a male householder and no spouse or partner present, and 21.6% were households with a female householder and no spouse or partner present. About 24.5% of all households were made up of individuals and 6.5% had someone living alone who was 65 years of age or older. The average household size was 3.14 and the average family size was 3.60.

There were 206 housing units, of which 17.0% were vacant. The homeowner vacancy rate was 0.0% and the rental vacancy rate was 9.5%. The population density was 60.9 inhabitants per square mile (23.5/km^{2}), and the housing unit density was 19.6 per square mile (7.6/km^{2}) with an occupancy rate of 83.0%.

Racial composition as of the 2020 census
Race	Number	Percent
White	20	3.1%
Black or African American	1	0.2%
American Indian and Alaska Native	616	96.2%
Asian	1	0.2%
Native Hawaiian and Other Pacific Islander	0	0.0%
Some other race	0	0.0%
Two or more races	2	0.3%
Hispanic or Latino (of any race)	4	0.6%

=== Income, education, and employment ===
The median income for a household in the city was $48,750, and the median income for a family was $52,500. 28.9% of the population were below the poverty line, including 33.1% of those under the age of 18 and 2.9% ages 65 or older. The per capita income was $17,983.

Of the city's population ages 25 and older, 79.5% had received as high school or equivalent degree, 21.2% had completed some college but not earned a post-secondary degree, 6.8% had received an associate's or bachelor's degree, and 3.0% held a graduate or professional degree.

60.6% of the city's workers were employed by the local, state, or federal government. 23.2% were employed by private companies, 14.1% by non-profit organizations, and 2.1% were self-employed.

== Education ==
Gambell is served by the Bering Strait School District. Gambell School serves grades Pre-K through 12. In 1984, two teams of Gambell students—one team of junior high students and one team of 9th through 12th grade—won two national championships in Future Problem Solving

In 2023, a team of junior high students (grades 6-8) won a Blade Engineer Award at the National KidWind Challenge held in Boulder, Colorado.

== Health ==
Sale, importation and possession of alcohol are banned in the village.
