= Gambell Army Airfield =

- IATA: none; ICAO: none

Summary
- Airport type: Military
- Owner: State of Alaska DOT&PF - Northern Region
- Location: Gambell, Alaska
- Built: 1943
- Elevation AMSL: 27 ft (8.2 m)
- Coordinates: 63°46′00″N 171°43′58″W

Map
- Location of airport in Alaska

Runways
Direction	Length		Surface
Direction	ft	m	Surface
16/34	4,500	1,372	Asphalt/concrete
- Source: Federal Aviation Administration

Gambell Army Airfield is a former United States Army airfield located in Gambell, a city in the Nome Census Area of the U.S. state of Alaska.

== History ==
Gambell Army Airfield was used as a transport base during World War II, facilitating the transit of Lend-Lease aircraft to the Soviet Union. It was also used by the USAAF as an emergency landing field for aircraft patrolling the west coast of Alaska.

== See also ==
- Alaska World War II Army Airfields
- Air Transport Command
- Northwest Staging Route
