= Gambell Airport =

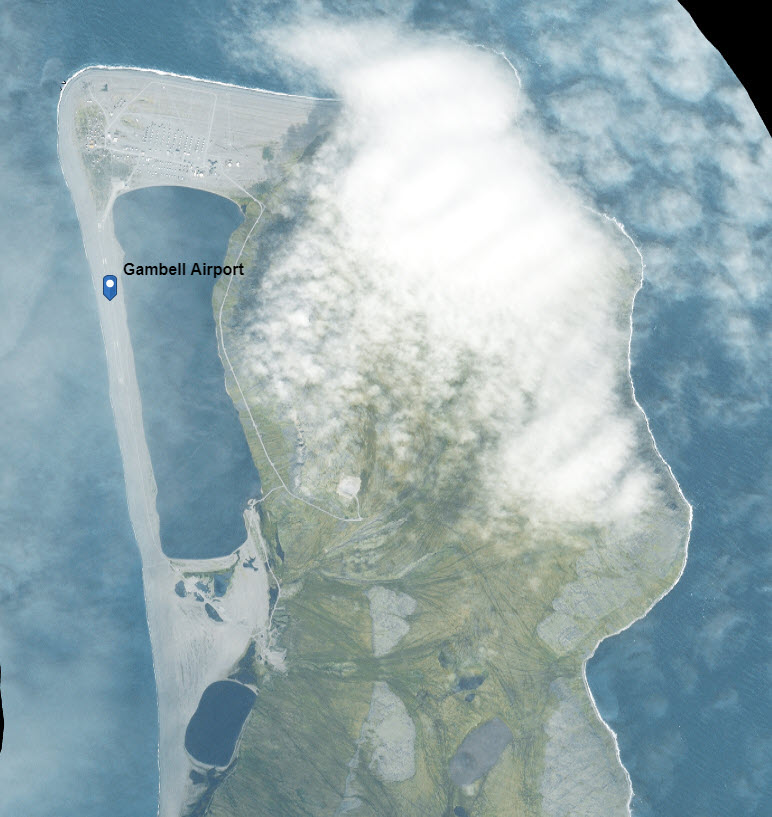
- IATA: GAM; ICAO: PAGM; FAA LID: GAM

Summary
- Airport type: Public
- Owner: State of Alaska DOT&PF - Northern Region
- Serves: Gambell, Alaska
- Built: 1943
- Elevation AMSL: 27 ft (8.2 m)
- Coordinates: 63°46′00″N 171°43′58″W

Map
- Location of airport in Alaska

Runways
Direction	Length		Surface
Direction	ft	m	Surface
16/34	4,500	1,372	Asphalt/concrete
- Source: Federal Aviation Administration

Gambell Airport (IATA: GAM, ICAO: PAGM, FAA LID: GAM) is a public airport located in Gambell, a city in the Nome Census Area of the U.S. state of Alaska. The airport is owned by the state.

== Facilities ==
Gambell Airport covers an area of 200 acres (81 ha) which contains one asphalt and concrete paved runway (16/34) measuring 4,500 x 96 ft (1,372 x 29 m).

== Airlines and destinations ==
As of March 2026, Gambell Airport (IATA: GAM), located on St. Lawrence Island in Alaska, is served by Bering Air, which operates flights to the following destinations:

Nome (OME): About 50 minutes flight time.

Savoonga (SVA): About 15 minutes flight time.

These routes are currently the only scheduled passenger services available at Gambell Airport.

Airlines	Destinations
Bering Air	Nome, Savoonga

== History ==
Gambell Airport was used as a transport base during World War II as Gambell Army Airfield, facilitating the transit of Lend-Lease aircraft to the Soviet Union. It was also used by the USAAF as an emergency landing field for aircraft patrolling the west coast of Alaska.

== Accidents and incidents ==
On 27 February 1974, a Soviet Union An-24LR carrying a crew of three and ten scientists on an ice-reconnaissance mission landed at Gambell due to fuel exhaustion in bad weather, causing a minor Cold War incident. Villagers, mostly Yupik Native Americans, provided space heaters and food. A U.S. Air Force C-130 flew in a load of fuel bladders with JP-1 fuel from Anchorage to refuel the An-24, which departed at 7:30 pm. She dipped her wings in salute in a pass over the airfield, then returned to Soviet airspace.

On 30 August 1975, Wien Air Alaska Flight 99, a Fairchild F-27B on approach to landing, crashed into Sevuokuk Mountain after multiple missed approaches, killing the pilot and co-pilot and eight others out of the 32 crew and passengers on board. The weather was a low ceiling with sea fog, and below approach minimums.

== See also ==
- List of airports in Alaska
