= Turnaround model =

Strategy for local education agencies in United States

The Turnaround Model is one of four strategies available to American local education agencies (LEAs) under the Race to the Top and School Improvement Grants programs of the Obama administration. The other three programs include Restart, Transformation, and School Closures.

The Obama administration increased its control over the education systems across the United States by implementing the American Recovery and Reinvestment Act of 2009 (ARRA), also known as the 2009 economic stimulus package. This act was instituted as a result of the looming deadline of No Child Left Behind (NCLB). The ARRA incorporates three tiers of federal funding to help eligible schools improve: Race to the Top (RTTT), School Improvement Grants (SIG), and Investing in Innovation Fund. The Obama Administration announced that $4.35 billion in RTTT, $3.5 billion in SIG, and $450 million would be given the U.S. Department of Education in order to begin a campaign targeted at increasing student achievement in the lowest performing 5% of schools across the United States.

The grants from RTTT and SIG, which is indirectly supported by RTTT, were made available to various State Education Agencies (SEAs). After receiving the large sums of money, SEAs re-allocated these funds to the Local Education Agencies (LEAs). In order to actually receive and utilize funds from RTTT or SIGs, an LEA had to demonstrate that it contained consistently low performing schools and it had to adhere to one of four generic models or strategies designed to "turn around" a school's performance. The Turnaround Model is one of the four strategies that an LEA can choose to implement in its local schools in an effort to raise student achievement per a 2009 Department of Education initiative. Though the Turnaround Model shares the name with the overarching program, the model is a particular strategy within the greater initiative.

== Policy history ==
The turnaround initiative stems back to the Elementary and Secondary Education Act (ESEA) of 1965, which was enacted by Congress under the Johnson Administration. The bill was designed in part to emphasize equal access to education and excellent educational opportunities for all children. Even though the bill was not originally authorized until 1970, it has been reauthorized every 5 years by Congress. In 2001, ESEA experienced its most significant reauthorization under the George W. Bush Administration in which it was not only reauthorized, but renamed No Child Left Behind (NCLB). NCLB operates with the same charge as ESEA, but focuses specifically on providing all children with accessibility to a high-quality education as measured by standardized assessments. NCLB also required states to create academic state standards and a testing system to measure students' progress against these standards. Additionally, NCLB pushed accountability for all students and flexibility at the district level, meaning that even students who are at a socioeconomic disadvantage must meet state standards and that districts are able to use federal funding as needed in their area. But unlike ESEA, NCLB introduced a requirement that by the year 2014, 100% of all students would be Proficient in Reading and Math. As the deadline for 100% Proficiency in Reading and Math continues to approach, it became increasingly obvious that unless there was a drastic change, the U.S. would not reach its 100% target and schools would receive various sanctions that correspond with length of underperformance. This reality prompted the Obama Administration to create the School Improvement Grant program (Section 1003(g) of Title I) and the four models of turnaround as a means to incentivize school revitalization through federal funds.

In addition to SIGs to aid school progress, President Obama and Secretary of Education Arne Duncan announced a $4.35 billion grant competition titled Race to the Top in July 2009. Funding stems from the American Recovery and Reinvestment Act of 2009 and states are evaluated based on a point system for various categories, including but not limited to annual professional performance review for teachers and principals, compliance with nationwide standards and assessment alignment, adoption of the Common Core Standards, and turning around the lowest-performing schools. As such, states that contain school districts with turnaround schools are eligible to apply for RTTT grants to receive additional funding to improve these schools.

Between 2001–2008, a predecessor to the Turnaround Model was originally used by the Chicago Public School System under then Chief Executive Officer Arne Duncan. To address the large number of low-performing public schools, Duncan worked with a variety of stakeholders to open new schools and close underperforming schools while simultaneously improve performance and teacher and principal quality. This success likely contributed to President Obama's selection of Duncan as the U.S. Secretary of Education in January 2009. This experience served as an inspiration to Duncan when creating and implementing the SIG and RTTT programs as Secretary of Education to utilize the $3.5 billion surplus to improve low-performing schools nationwide. Between June and August 2010, 2,000 tenured and untenured teachers were laid off from Chicago Public Schools. Opponents of the move claimed that the main driving force behind the move was budgetary concerns, rather than school improvement, with one laid-off teacher explaining, "...You can hire three new, untenured teachers for the price of a tenured teacher.".

== Policy in action ==
A school is that is designated in the lowest performing 5% of all schools in the nations has consistently not met Annual Yearly Progress (AYP). As such, schools that are identified in this category are subject to one of the four Initiatives to turn schools around (Turnaround, Restart, Transformation, or Closure). The Turnaround model, specifically, varies from school to school, yet it meets many of the following criteria.

- "Replace principal
- Use locally adopted "turnaround" competencies to review and select staff for school (rehire no more than 50% of existing staff)
- Implement strategies to recruit, place, and retain staff
- Select and implement an instructional model based on student needs
- Provide job-embedded professional development (PD) designed to build capacity and support staff
- Ensure continuous use of data to inform and differentiate instruction
- Provide increased learning time for staff and students
- Provide social-emotional and community-oriented services and supports
- Implement new governance structure
- Grant operating flexibility to school leader"*

Information in bullet points above is outlined directly from School Improvement Grant.

School designated to be turned around must meet the criteria selected for them in two to three years. Specifically, they must reach target growth goals that ultimately build up to the achievement of AYP in the course of three years. If they do not, they will be subject to further changes that become progressively more severe as time continues to pass, including direct intervention from the state.

Because the tenets of the American Recovery and Reinvestment Act of 2009 are relatively new, there is no precedent in how schools can push their students to reach AYP in the turnaround model. School administrations and principals are given a sense of freedom in their methods to reach projected target growth goals each year. There have, however, been several models for this process from schools and districts that have attained "turnaround" status.

Several case studies have been performed since the inception of the SIG and RTTT programs in assisting schools deemed turnaround. One study gathered data on four states (California, Illinois, North Carolina and Tennessee,) that contained districts and schools that received SIG funding for the 2010–2011 school year. District officials and representatives from several State Educational Agencies (SEAs) also offered information on SIG implementation and accountability within their respective states. The analysis found that some school districts with eligible low-performing schools did not apply for SIG funding because "they lacked the capacity, resources, and budget to implement and support the major changes required by the federal intervention models." The studies also found that state and local resistance to federal intervention in improving schools prevented broader participation in applications for SIG funding. Lastly, the analysis discovered that data systems and improved accountability measurements enhanced the states' ability to accurately apportion funds based on student performance. The primary message of these case studies in California, Illinois, North Carolina and Tennessee is that the requirements outlined to receive SIG (as well as RTTT) funds ultimately compel states to use such funding in a manner that collectively seeks to improve the lowest performing schools nationwide.

One school that is currently in its second year of being turned around is Benjamin Stoddert Middle School in Prince George's County, MD. Like Central High School, Benjamin Stoddert engages in PLCs as a method of teacher reflection and improvement. This year, the school aimed to increase the bar for rigor by requiring all staff to participate in Research for Better Teaching (RBT). As its name indicates, this professional development model aims to use assessment data to help teachers and strategize ways to increase standardized test scores. From the 2009–2010 Academic Year to the 2010–2011 Academic Year, when Benjamin Stoddert was designated Turnaround, percentage of eighth grade students achieving advanced or proficient scores on the Maryland School Assessment (MSA) in Reading increased from 47.7% to 51.7%. Furthermore, percentage of eighth grade students achieving advanced or proficient scores on the MSA in Math from the 2010 Academic Year to the 2011 Academic Year increased from 15.8% to 21.1%. While there was evidence for improvement, Benjamin Stoddert did not meet its personal target growth goals for the Academic Year of 2011.

== Policy evolution ==
The Turnaround Model as well as the other models aimed at changing the trajectory of the lowest performing schools in the nation has not changed significantly since it was only implemented in 2009.

What is more notable is the fact that the size of the federal grant has changed over time. The School Improvement Grant Program had already been established in 2007 because almost 10% of the nation's public schools were not meeting Annual Yearly Progress (AYP). At this time, however, the grant only included $125 million. Since 2007, the grant progressively increased, especially with the implementation of the American Recovery and Reinvestment Act of 2009 (ARRA).

Furthermore, out of 15,277 schools that were eligible for a grant, only 1,128 schools were awarded the grant. Even though the need for funding for failing schools is high, only 7.3% of those schools are awarded these improvement grants. In addition, only 20% of the total school funded are identified as TurnAround. Most of the schools identified either have a high population of minority students or high population of students from a lower socioeconomic background.

A final point to note is that although the inherent structure of the Turnaround Model has not changed over the course of two years, the actual implementation of it does vary from school to school. While there are certain criteria that must be met at every school, districts and principals have relative freedom to utilize the structures that best suit the needs of the student audience receiving the education.
