= Gambell incident =

1974 Soviet aviation incident in Alaska

Coordinates: 63.784°N 171.747°W

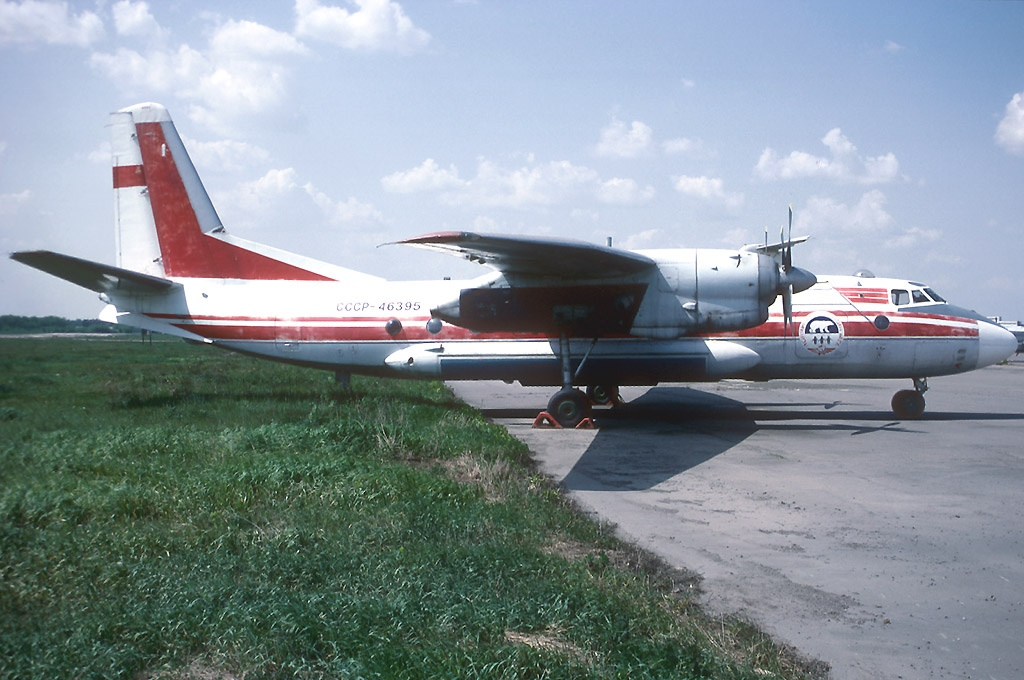
An Antonov An-24LR similar to the incident aircraft

On February 27, 1974, a Soviet Antonov An-24LR "Toros" (CCCP-47195) ice reconnaissance aircraft landed at Gambell Airport, Alaska. The plane, carrying three crew members and twelve scientists, was en route to Anadyr, USSR. Due to strong winds, the pilot decided to divert to Provideniya, USSR, which was fogged in. The aircraft was low on fuel, so the crew chose to divert to Gambell, United States, located 62 miles (100 km) southeast of Provideniya, USSR, across the Bering Sea. The plane made a straight-in approach, and one of the engines quit shortly before landing due to fuel starvation.

Word quickly spread around the community that a Soviet plane had landed, and this prompted villagers to come out to the airfield. There was a friendly meeting between Russians and locals, and souvenirs were exchanged. Some locals banded together to bring space heaters and food for the Russian visitors.

The incident took place during the height of the Cold War era. An Alaska State Trooper and members of the Alaska National Guard from Nome were dispatched to provide security for the plane. The Soviet Embassy in Washington was aware of the diversion and contacted the U.S. State Department and the Department of Defense and requested fuel for the stranded plane. A U.S. Air Force C-130 plane with fuel bladders took on a load of JP-1 fuel at Anchorage and flew directly to Gambell, where it refueled the plane.

The An-24 was cleared for departure and took off at 7:30 pm on the 28th. It made a pass over the airfield, dipping its wings in a gesture of thanks, and returned to Soviet airspace.
