= Savoonga, Alaska =

Savoonga Sivungaq (Central Siberian Yupik)
- City
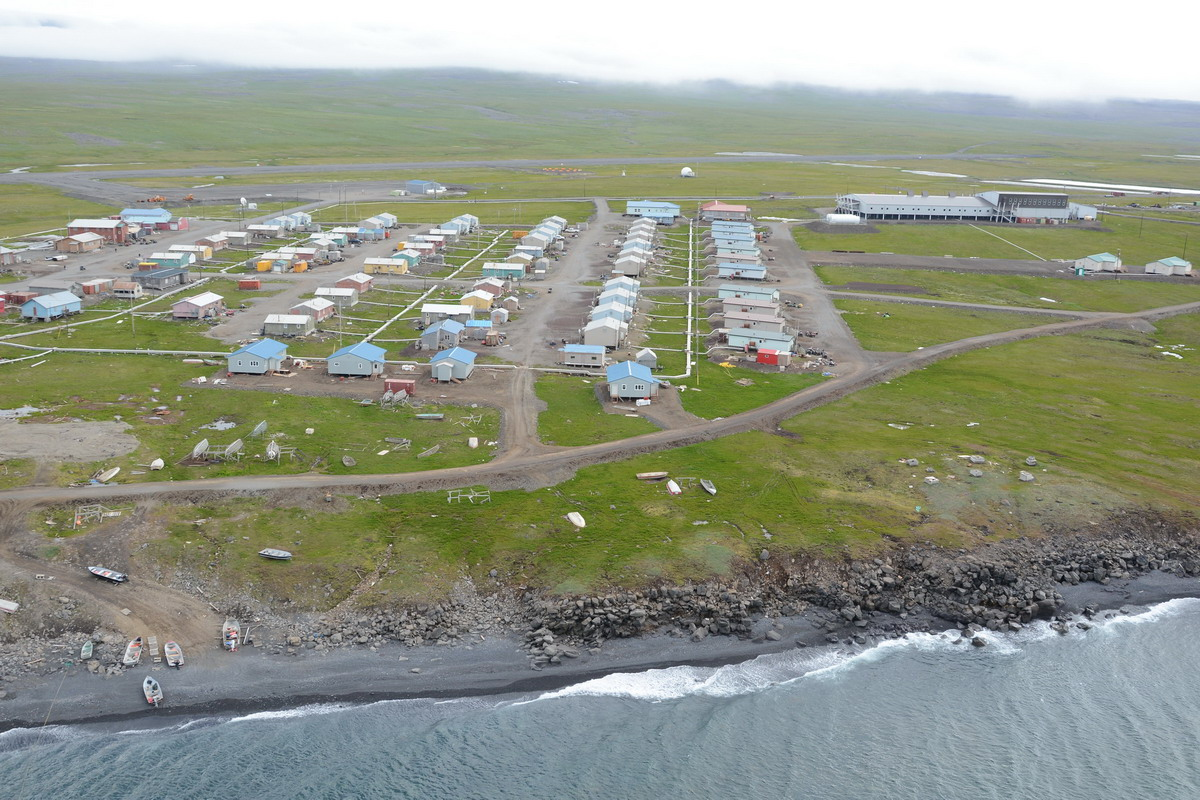
- Savoonga in 2013

- Location in Alaska
- Coordinates: 63°41′48″N 170°27′39″W
- Country: United States
- State: Alaska
- Census Area: Nome
- Incorporated: October 6, 1969

Government
  - Mayor: Myron Kingeekuk
  - State senator: Donald Olson (D)
  - State rep.: Neal Foster (D)

Area
  - Total: 5.87 sq mi (15.21 km^{2})
  - Land: 5.87 sq mi (15.21 km^{2})
  - Water: 0 sq mi (0.00 km^{2})
- Elevation: 0 ft (0 m)

Population (2020)
  - Total: 835
  - Density: 142.2/sq mi (54.91/km^{2})
- Time zone: UTC-09:00 (AKST)
  - Summer (DST): UTC-08:00 (AKDT)
- ZIP code: 99769
- Area code: 907
- FIPS code: 02-67460
- GNIS feature ID: 1409106

Savoonga is a city in Nome Census Area, Alaska, United States. It is located on St. Lawrence Island in the Bering Sea. As of the 2020 census, Savoonga's population was 835, up from 671 in 2010.

Savoonga was incorporated in 1969. In 1971, it became joint owner of St. Lawrence Island along with the island's only other city, Gambell.

The local economy consists largely of subsistence hunting for walrus, seals, fish, and bowhead whales. The city calls itself the "Walrus Capital of the World". A dogsled mail service operated until 1963.

== History ==
St. Lawrence Island has been inhabited sporadically for the past 2,000 years by both Alaskan Yup'ik and Siberian Yupik people. In the 18th and 19th centuries, the island had a population of about 4,000 in numerous villages.

Between 1878 and 1880, a famine devastated the island's population. Many who did not starve left. The remaining population of St. Lawrence Island was nearly all Siberian Yupik.

In 1900, reindeer were introduced on the island and by 1917, the herd had grown to over 10,000 animals. A reindeer camp was established near present-day Savoonga in 1916. The village of Savoonga was established near the camp in the 1930s. Good hunting and trapping in the area attracted more residents.

Gambell and Savoonga received joint title to most of the land on St. Lawrence Island under the Alaska Native Claims Settlement Act of 1971.

In 1985 disaster struck Savoonga when 8 people died in one incident after a skiff carrying six members of the Kiyuklook family was swamped, leading to them drowning, and 2 further people drowned while attempting to rescue them.

== Geography ==
Savoonga is on the northern coast of St. Lawrence Island in the Bering Sea. It is 63 km (39 mi) southeast of Gambell.

According to the United States Census Bureau, the city has a total area of 6.1 square miles (16 km^{2}), all of it land.

Most people on St. Lawrence Island speak Siberian Yupik.

There are daily flights from Nome to Savoonga Airport, weather permitting.

=== Climate ===
Savoonga has a polar climate (Köppen ET) with short, cool summers and long, freezing winters lasting from the beginning of October to the end of May. Average annual snowfall totals 68.6 inches or 1.74 metres with peak snowpack depth being 21 inches or 0.53 metres in April.

Climate data for Cape Northeast, Alaska
Month	Jan	Feb	Mar	Apr	May	Jun	Jul	Aug	Sep	Oct	Nov	Dec	Year
Record high °F (°C)	48 (9)	43 (6)	48 (9)	44 (7)	53 (12)	63 (17)	68 (20)	66 (19)	57 (14)	50 (10)	42 (6)	45 (7)	68 (20)
Mean daily maximum °F (°C)	15.0 (−9.4)	8.5 (−13.1)	15.1 (−9.4)	23.0 (−5.0)	35.2 (1.8)	44.6 (7.0)	51.8 (11.0)	50.5 (10.3)	44.4 (6.9)	34.3 (1.3)	27.2 (−2.7)	12.6 (−10.8)	30.2 (−1.0)
Daily mean °F (°C)	9.6 (−12.4)	2.7 (−16.3)	8.4 (−13.1)	16.6 (−8.6)	31.9 (−0.1)	39.8 (4.3)	46.9 (8.3)	46.9 (8.3)	41.3 (5.2)	31.5 (−0.3)	23.8 (−4.6)	8.3 (−13.2)	25.6 (−3.5)
Mean daily minimum °F (°C)	4.1 (−15.5)	−3.2 (−19.6)	1.7 (−16.8)	10.1 (−12.2)	26.5 (−3.1)	34.9 (1.6)	42.1 (5.6)	43.4 (6.3)	38.1 (3.4)	28.6 (−1.9)	20.3 (−6.5)	3.9 (−15.6)	20.9 (−6.2)
Record low °F (°C)	−27 (−33)	−36 (−38)	−32 (−36)	−16 (−27)	−4 (−20)	25 (−4)	32 (0)	32 (0)	24 (−4)	3 (−16)	−9 (−23)	−26 (−32)	−36 (−38)
Average precipitation inches (mm)	1.03 (26)	0.85 (22)	1.08 (27)	0.83 (21)	0.61 (15)	0.57 (14)	1.19 (30)	3.14 (80)	2.94 (75)	2.90 (74)	1.57 (40)	0.60 (15)	17.31 (439)
Average snowfall inches (cm)	9.0 (23)	8.4 (21)	9.9 (25)	7.9 (20)	3.2 (8.1)	0.3 (0.76)	0.0 (0.0)	0.0 (0.0)	0.7 (1.8)	9.4 (24)	12.3 (31)	7.5 (19)	68.6 (174)
Source: WRCC

== Demographics ==
Historical population
Census	Pop.	Note	%±
1930	139		—
1940	209		50.4%
1950	249		19.1%
1960	299		20.1%
1970	364		21.7%
1980	491		34.9%
1990	519		5.7%
2000	643		23.9%
2010	671		4.4%
2020	835		24.4%
U.S. Decennial Census

Savoonga first appeared on the 1930 U.S. Census as an unincorporated village. It formally incorporated in 1969.

=== Racial and ethnic composition ===
Savoonga city, Alaska – Racial and ethnic composition Note: the US Census treats Hispanic/Latino as an ethnic category. This table excludes Latinos from the racial categories and assigns them to a separate category. Hispanics/Latinos may be of any race.
Race / Ethnicity (NH = Non-Hispanic)	Pop 2000	Pop 2010	Pop 2020	% 2000	% 2010	% 2020
White alone (NH)	28	33	18	4.35%	4.92%	2.16%
Black or African American alone (NH)	0	0	1	0.00%	0.00%	0.12%
Native American or Alaska Native alone (NH)	613	634	803	95.33%	94.49%	96.17%
Asian alone (NH)	1	1	3	0.16%	0.15%	0.36%
Native Hawaiian or Pacific Islander alone (NH)	0	0	0	0.00%	0.00%	0.00%
Other race alone (NH)	0	0	0	0.00%	0.00%	0.00%
Mixed race or Multiracial (NH)	1	3	5	0.16%	0.45%	0.60%
Hispanic or Latino (any race)	0	0	5	0.00%	0.00%	0.60%
Total	643	671	835	100.00%	100.00%	100.00%

=== 2020 census ===
As of the 2020 census, Savoonga had a population of 835. The median age was 26.3 years. 36.2% of residents were under the age of 18 and 8.6% of residents were 65 years of age or older. For every 100 females there were 116.3 males, and for every 100 females age 18 and over there were 116.7 males age 18 and over.

0.0% of residents lived in urban areas, while 100.0% lived in rural areas.

There were 188 households in Savoonga, of which 61.7% had children under the age of 18 living in them. Of all households, 29.3% were married-couple households, 36.7% were households with a male householder and no spouse or partner present, and 22.9% were households with a female householder and no spouse or partner present. About 19.7% of all households were made up of individuals and 5.3% had someone living alone who was 65 years of age or older.

There were 204 housing units, of which 7.8% were vacant. The homeowner vacancy rate was 0.0% and the rental vacancy rate was 6.1%.

Racial composition as of the 2020 census
Race	Number	Percent
White	18	2.2%
Black or African American	1	0.1%
American Indian and Alaska Native	807	96.6%
Asian	3	0.4%
Native Hawaiian and Other Pacific Islander	0	0.0%
Some other race	0	0.0%
Two or more races	6	0.7%
Hispanic or Latino (of any race)	5	0.6%

=== 2000 census ===
At the 2000 census, there were 643 people, 145 households, and 113 families residing in the city. The population density was 105.5 inhabitants per square mile (40.7/km^{2}). There were 160 housing units at an average density of 26.2 per square mile (10.1/km^{2}). The racial makeup of the city was 95.33% Native American, 4.35% White, 0.16% Asian, and 0.16% from other races.

Of the 145 households, 55.2% had children under the age of 18 living with them, 49.7% were married couples living together, 15.9% had a female householder with no husband present, and 21.4% were non-families. 16.6% of all households were made up of individuals, and 0.7% had someone living alone who was 65 years of age or older. The average household size was 4.43 and the average family size was 5.22.

In the city, the age distribution of the population shows 36.1% under the age of 18, 13.2% from 18 to 24, 28.6% from 25 to 44, 16.5% from 45 to 64, and 5.6% who were 65 years of age or older. The median age was 26 years. For every 100 females, there were 101.6 males. For every 100 females age 18 and over, there were 115.2 males.

The median income for a household in the city was $23,438, and the median income for a family was $27,917. Males had a median income of $30,500 versus $29,167 for females. The per capita income for the city was $7,725. About 29.3% of families and 29.1% of the population were below the poverty line, including 40.6% of those under age 18 and 9.8% of those age 65 or over.

== Economy ==
As of 2013, 25% of the adults in the community had no jobs. Of those who did, 37% worked for the school system. Other jobs involved air transportation, fishing, and the oil industry.

== Education ==
Savoonga is served by the Bering Strait School District. Hogarth Kingeekuk Memorial School serves grades Pre-K through 12.

== Notable people ==
- Annie Aghnaqa (Akeya) Alowa (1924–1999), Yup'ik environmental activist, healer, leader
