= Savoonga Airport =

Airport in Alaska, United States of America

- IATA: SVA; ICAO: PASA; FAA LID: SVA

Summary
- Airport type: Public
- Owner: Alaska DOT&PF - Northern Region
- Serves: Savoonga, Alaska
- Elevation AMSL: 53 ft / 16 m
- Coordinates: 63°41′11″N 170°29′33″W

Map
- Location of airport in Alaska

Runways
Direction	Length		Surface
Direction	ft	m	Surface
5/23	4,400	1,341	Gravel
- Source: Federal Aviation Administration

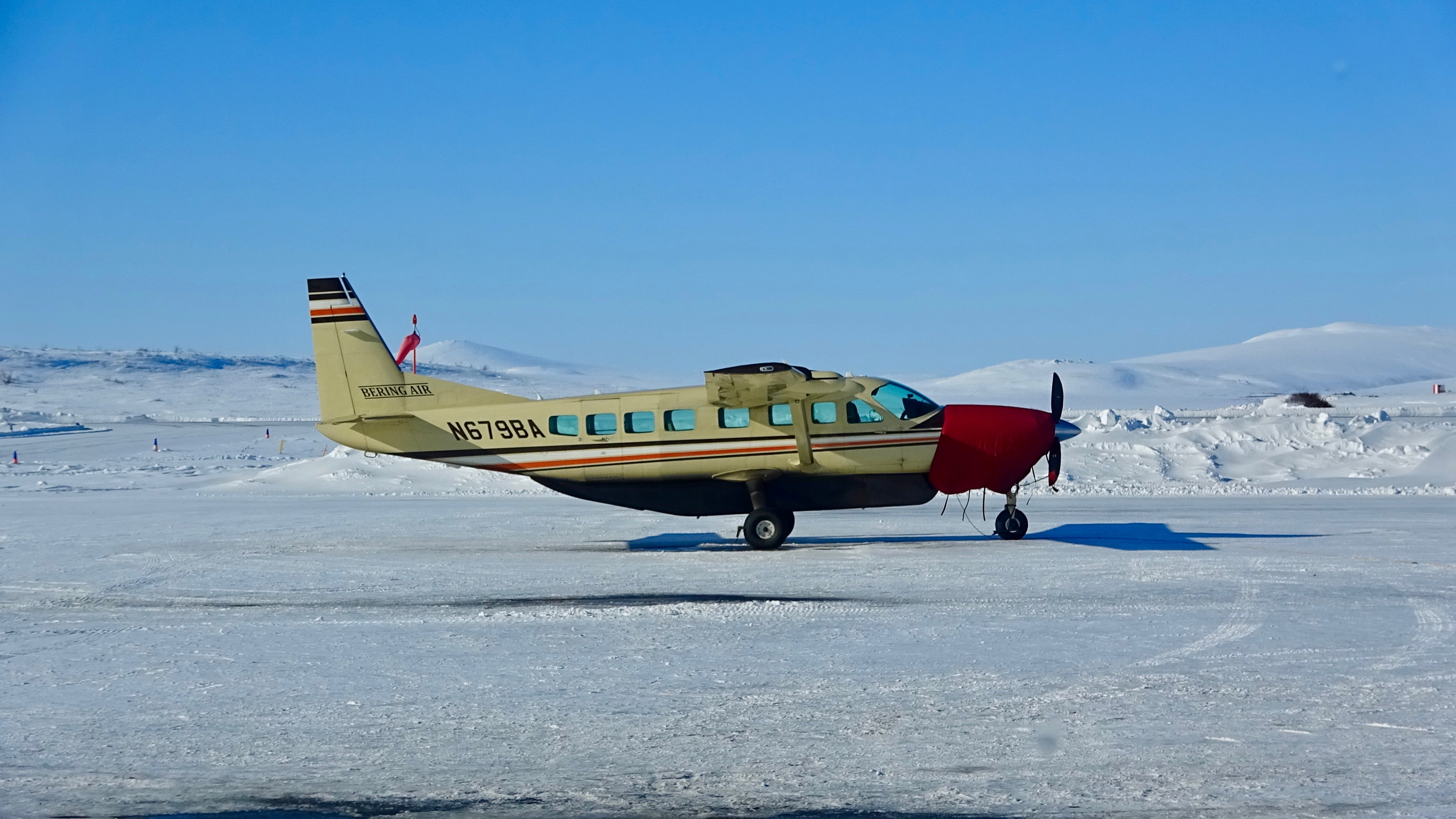
A Bering Air Cessna 208B Grand Caravan in Nome, Alaska.

Savoonga Airport (IATA: SVA, ICAO: PASA, FAA LID: SVA) is a state-owned public-use airport located two nautical miles (4 km) south of the central business district of Savoonga, a city in the Nome Census Area of the U.S. state of Alaska. Savoonga is located on St. Lawrence Island in the Bering Sea.

== Facilities ==
Savoonga Airport covers an area of 834 acres (338 ha) at an elevation of 53 feet (16 m) above mean sea level. It has one runway designated 5/23 with a 4,400 × 100 ft (1,341 × 30 m) gravel surface.

== Airlines and destinations ==
Airlines	Destinations
Bering Air	Gambell, Nome

== See also ==
- List of airports in Alaska
