= School Improvement Grant =

U.S. Department of Education grant

School Improvement Grants (SIGs) are grants awarded by the U.S. Department of Education to state education agencies (SEAs) under Section 1003(g) of the Elementary and Secondary Education Act of 1965 (a.k.a. ESEA, reauthorized by the No Child Left Behind Act (NCLB) in 2002). The SEAs, in turn, award subgrants to local educational agencies (LEA’s, also known as school districts) for the purpose of supporting focused school improvement efforts. In 2009, the Obama administration, and specifically U.S. Secretary of Education Arne Duncan, challenged the education community to make the lowest-achieving schools its highest priority.

With funds allocated under the American Recovery and Reinvestment Act of 2009, the U.S. Department of Education dramatically increased the funds provided to SEAs under section 1003(g) while issuing program requirements that charged the SEAs with channeling the funds to LEAs for the “persistently lowest-achieving schools” to support rapid improvement through four relatively prescriptive intervention models:
• The turnaround model in which the LEA replaces the principal and rehires no more than 50% of the staff, gives the principal greater autonomy, and implements other prescribed and recommended strategies.
• The “restart model” in which the LEA converts or closes and reopens a school under a charter school operator, charter management organization, or education management organization.
• The “school closure model” in which the LEA closes the school and enrolls the students in other schools in the LEA that are higher achieving.
• The “transformation model” in which the LEA replaces the principal (except in specified situations), implements a rigorous staff evaluation and development system, institutes comprehensive instructional reform, increases learning time and applies community-oriented school strategies, and provides greater operational flexibility and support for the school.

== Announcement ==
On December 3, 2009, U.S. Secretary of Education Arne Duncan announced the final requirements for $3.5 billion in Title I School Improvement Grants (SIGs) to turn around the nation’s lowest performing schools. The applications were due into the U.S. Department of Education by February. 8, 2010. These funds were made available to states by formula and competed for by school districts. As they competed for the funds, school districts/local educational agencies (LEAs) were required to identify the schools they wanted to transform, and then determine which of four models was most appropriate: the turnaround model, the restart model, school closure, or the transformation model. The law delineates the requirements for each of the four models. If a school had begun implementation of one of these four models or components of one of these models within the previous two years, it was permitted to apply to use SIG funds to continue to implement the full model.

== Lowest Achieving ==
The SIG program reflects the federal government's prioritization of the lowest-achieving public schools. The Center on Innovation & Improvement, one of five federally funded content centers, has developed extensive guidance regarding implementation of the SIG program. As outlined in the SIG regulations, the Department has articulated very specific parameters regarding the approaches states and districts are to use to drive dramatic improvement. Under guidance promulgated by the U.S. Department of Education, states must distribute 95% of their SIG grant dollars to districts and, in turn, districts must prioritize awards to districts based on need as measured by individual schools’ academic performance and concentration of poverty. As outlined in the law, when awarding subgrants to districts, states must “give priority to the local educational agencies with the lowest-achieving schools that demonstrate —
(A) the greatest need for such funds; and
(B) the strongest commitment to ensuring that such funds are used to provide adequate resources to enable the lowest-achieving schools to meet the goals under school and local educational improvement, corrective action, and restructuring plans under section 1116.”

Under the 2010 guidance related to Section 1003(g), state departments of education are required to identify their “persistently lowest-achieving” schools . School districts that have schools identified as persistently lowest-achieving apply to the state department of education to obtain School Improvement Grants. As part of their grant application, districts must identify which of the four intervention models (i.e., turnaround, restart, closure, or transformation) they intend to implement in each of the identified lowest-achieving schools. While the LEAs must apply one of the four intervention models in schools defined as “persistently lowest-achieving,” once the state has allocated adequate resources to these schools, according to the federal requirements, the state can use the remaining School Improvement Grant funds for districts to implement other interventions and supports to improve other Title I schools (i.e., schools eligible for federal aid under Title I of ESEA [i.e., NCLB] due to high concentrations of poverty) in improvement, corrective action, or restructuring.

== Tiers ==
The SIG regulations define three tiers of schools for purposes of obtaining SIG funds. Each tier represents a level of priority for the SIG funds. In determining which districts receive grants, the state takes into account (1) the number of low-performing schools in the state, (2) the tiers these schools occupy, and (3) the LEA’s capacity to effectively implement the models and strategies outlined in the SIG application. The three tiers of schools identified as lowest achieving, in priority order for assistance through School Improvement Grants, are:

- Tier I: Title I schools in improvement, corrective action, or restructuring that are identified by the SEA as “persistently lowest-achieving.”
- Tier II: Secondary schools that are eligible for, but do not receive, Title I-Part A funds and are identified by the SEA as “persistently lowest-achieving.”
- Tier III: Title I schools in improvement, corrective action, or restructuring that are not Tier I schools.

== School Improvement Grant intervention models ==
=== Turnaround model ===
Changes required to occur under the turnaround model as outlined by the U.S. Department of Education are:

- Replace principal
- Use locally adopted "turnaround" competencies to review and select staff for school (rehire no more than 50% of existing staff)
- Implement strategies to recruit, place, and retain staff
- Select and implement an instructional model based on student needs
- Provide job-embedded professional development (PD) designed to build capacity and support staff
- Ensure continuous use of data to inform and differentiate instruction
- Provide increased learning time for staff and students
- Provide social-emotional and community-oriented services and supports
- Implement new governance structure
- Grant operating flexibility to school leader

Schools implementing the turnaround model may also implement any of the required or permissible strategies under the Transformation Model.

The theory of action underlying the turnaround model is that the existing configuration of leadership and instructional personnel has not created a learning environment in which students are succeeding. Therefore, in order to dramatically change the environment for the benefit of the children currently enrolled in the school, the adults must change. Under the turnaround model, change entails literal change of personnel as well as behavioral change by the high-capacity personnel that remain.

=== Restart model ===
Under the restart model, the district converts a school or closes and reopens a school under a charter school operator, a charter management organization (CMO), or an education management organization (EMO) that has been selected through a rigorous review process. A restart model must enroll, within the grades it serves, any former student who wishes to attend the school. A rigorous review process could take into consideration such things as an applicant’s team, track record, instructional program, model’s theory of action, and sustainability. As part of this model, a state must review the process the LEA will use/has used to select the partner.

The theory of action underlying restart, also referred to as "Starting Fresh" as first codified in the charter sector, is that restart allows a state, district, or other authorizing entity to break the cycle of low achievement by making deep and fundamental changes to the way the school operates. Research from the charter sector indicates that in order to realize the full potential of restarting low-achieving schools, states/districts should:

- define explicit expectations for performance;
- empower high capacity school leaders to make dramatic changes absent avoidable intrusion from external governing bodies (e.g., state, school district, or authorizer);
- create a positive new school culture that will catalyze success;
- recruit and retain skilled and committed educators to the schools and classrooms with the greatest need; and
- satisfy and engage parents in order to keep their children in public schools.

=== School closure model ===
School closure occurs when an LEA closes a school and enrolls the students who attended that school in other schools in the LEA that are higher achieving. Other schools should be within reasonable proximity to the closed school and may include, but are not limited to, charter schools or new schools for which achievement data are not yet available.

The theory of action underlying the closure model is that school capacity according to multiple measures (e.g., academic performance, school culture/expectations, teacher performance, or facilities) is so low as to preclude a reasonable expectation of dramatic improvement for students currently enrolled. Therefore, closing the school and transitioning students to a higher performing school is the best strategy to dramatically improve their academic outcomes.

=== Transformation model ===
The theory of action underlying the transformation model is that the existing configuration of leadership and instructional personnel has not created a learning environment in which students are succeeding. As a result, to dramatically change the environment for the benefit of the children currently enrolled in the school, the adults must change. Under transformation, change entails literal change of leadership as well as behavioral change by instructional personnel.

Changes required to occur under the transformation model, as outlined by the U.S. Department of Education, are:

- Replace principal
- Implement new evaluation system developed with staff
- Use student growth as a significant factor
- Identify and reward staff who are increasing student outcomes; support and then remove those who are not
- Implement strategies to recruit, place, and retain staff
- Select and implement an instructional model based on student needs
- Provide job-embedded professional development designed to build capacity and support staff
- Ensure continuous use of data to inform and differentiate instruction
- Provide increased learning time
- Provide an ongoing mechanism for community and family engagement
- Partner to provide social-emotional and community-oriented services and supports
- Provide sufficient operating flexibility to implement reform
- Ensure ongoing technical assistance

== Selecting the "right" intervention model ==
In fulfilling their obligations outlined under the SIG regulations, LEAs must identify schools targeted for intervention based on persistent low performance and thereafter outline which of the four interventions models each school will adopt.

Guidance developed by the Center on Innovation & Improvement directs LEAs to select the "best" intervention model based on an appraisal of school and district capacity as well as an assessment of the supply of external partners or providers available to lead effort

Research that has emerged from school restructuring efforts in multiple districts using the intervention models outlined in the SIG regulations indicates that determining the best fit should be based on an appraisal of school and district capacity as well as an assessment of the supply of external partners or providers available to lead the effort. Research conducted by the Center on Education Policy has documented that there is not one single "best" approach to dramatic school improvement efforts. Rather, success is generally a result of multiple coordinated initiatives. However, there is strong evidence that a key aspect of successful restructuring under NCLB is use data (e.g., at least once a month) to make decisions about instructional practices. Replacing staff can be a component of school improvement but it can also have negative consequences if not handled well.

There is a growing body of research that indicates that school districts must play a central role in coordinating and supporting change. Individual schools are responsible for implementing the change initiative but the district sets the stage for meaningful and sustainable change. Specifically, LEAs can support school improvement efforts identified in the SIG program by:

- Committing to success in spite of challenges,
- Identifying schools for targeted intervention,
- Assessing capacity in order to determine “best” intervention strategy,
- Cultivating a pipeline of highly capable turnaround/transformation/restart school leaders, and
- Create conditions for success (i.e., grant school leaders the autonomy and flexibility to make the necessary big changes).

== Criticism ==
The legislation has had its critics. For example, in a September 25, 2009 open letter to the Office of Elementary and Secondary Education, Gail Connelly, Executive Director of the National Association of Elementary School Principals (NAESP), wrote, “NAESP supports the Secretary’s initiative to identify the lowest performing schools, establish rigorous interventions, provide them sufficient resources over multiple years to implement those interventions, and hold them accountable for improving student performance. However, we fundamentally disagree with the approach to enact this wide-ranging and transformational reform initiative with the simplistic and reactionary step of replacing principals as the first step in turning around low-performing schools. NAESP strongly supports reform models that provide the essential resources existing principals of low-performing schools must have to succeed. These resources include the necessary time, talent and tools.”

And on March 1, 2010, when President Obama gave a speech speaking of the necessity of letting go teachers at failing schools such as those in the Central Falls (RI) School District's only high school, Dennis Van Roekel, president of the National Education Association, said, “The tone used to describe the teachers in Central Falls has been disparaging and unforgiving. It's time for federal officials to get out of the blame game and into the classroom. One thing is certain: Firing the entire faculty of a school that is on the path to improvement is no recipe for turning around a struggling high school. And relying on a magical pool of ‘excellent teachers’ to spring forth and replace them is naïve at best and desperately misguided. Approaches that point the finger at educators do nothing to bring about substantive improvements for students. To the contrary, it provides a momentary perception of correcting a problem. But in reality, we all know that the solution is not blame, it is collaboration—collaboration among school employees, management, parents and communities. No one benefits when school staffs are summarily dismissed —- not communities and certainly not students. In the end all that approach gets anyone is a good sound bite.”

A critical review of School Improvement Grants was published by Craig Waddell, in April 2011.

A study published by the Department of Education in January 2017, days before the end of the Obama administration, found "no significant impact on math or reading test scores, high school graduation, or college enrollment" by the School Improvement Grants program. The findings of the report will likely be used to support a push by the incoming Secretary of Education away from such programs designed around intervening in low-performing schools, in favor of implementing "school choice" policies instead. The Trump administration's nominee, Betsy DeVos, has been a proponent of privatization of education and creation of charter schools, instead of attempting to improve currently failing public schools.

== Additional resources and references ==
Center on Innovation & Improvement. (2010) Handbook on Effective Implementation of School Improvement Grants (2010). Available online: http://www.centerii.org/handbook/

The Center for Comprehensive School Reform and Improvement. (2009). School restructuring, What Works when? A guide for education leaders. Washington, DC: Learning Points Associates. Retrieved from http://www.centerforcsri.org/files/School_Restructuring_Guide.pdf

Center on Innovation & Improvement (Writer, Producer), & Council of Chief State School Officers (Producer). (2010, March). School improvement Grant (SIG) intervention models: The closure model. [audiovisual recording]. Prepared for the National Network of State School Improvement Leaders. Lincoln, IL: Center on Innovation & Improvement. Retrieved from http://www.centerii.org/

Kowal, J., Hassel, E. A., & Hassel, B. C. (2009). Successful school turnarounds: Seven steps for district leaders. Washington, DC: The Center for Comprehensive School Reform and Improvement. Issue brief retrieved from http://centerforcsri.org/files/CenterIssueBriefSept09.pdf webcast retrieved from: http://www.centerforcsri.org/webcasts/school-turnarounds/

Redding, S. & Walberg, H. (2008). Handbook on Statewide Systems of Support. Center on Innovation & Improvement. Available online: www.centerii.org

Redding, S. (2010). Selecting the intervention model and partners. Lincoln, IL: Center on Innovation & Improvement. Retrieved from www.centerii.org

Redding, S. (2006). The mega system: Deciding. Learning. Connecting. Lincoln, IL, Academic Development Institute, downloaded at www.centerii.org/survey

Steiner, L. (2009). Tough decisions: Closing persistently low-performing schools. Lincoln, IL: Center on Innovation & Improvement. Retrieved from http://www.centerii.org/survey/
U.S. Department of Education (2010). Guidance on School Improvement Grants Under Section 1003(g) of the Elementary and Secondary Education Act of 1965. Washington, DC. Author. The final requirements for the SIG program, set forth in 74 FR 65618 (Dec. 10, 2009), and amended by the interim final requirements, set forth in 75 FR (Jan. 21, 2010) (final requirements), implement both the requirements of section 1003(g) of the ESEA and the flexibilities for the SIG program provided through the Consolidated Appropriations Act, 2010.
