= Siberian Yupik =

Yupik who live near the Bering Strait

Юпик, йупигыт
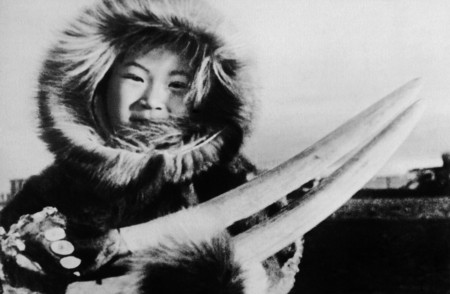
- A Siberian Yupik woman holding walrus tusks, photo by Nabogatova

Total population
- c. 2,828

Regions with significant populations
- Chukotka in the Russian Far East, St. Lawrence Island in Alaska
- Russia: Chukotka (Chukchi Peninsula): 1,728
- United States: Alaska: 1,100

Languages
- Siberian Yupik, Russian, English

Religion
- Shamanism; Christianity (Moravian church and Russian Orthodox Church)

Related ethnic groups
- Alutiiq, Central Alaskan Yup'ik

Siberian Yupiks, or Yuits (Russian: Юиты), are a Yupik people who reside along the coast of the Chukchi Peninsula in the far northeast of the Russian Federation and on St. Lawrence Island in Alaska. They speak Central Siberian Yupik (also known as Yuit), a Yupik language of the Eskimo–Aleut family of languages.

Sirenik Eskimos also live in that area, but their extinct language, Sireniki Eskimo, shows many peculiarities among Eskimo languages and is mutually unintelligible with the neighboring Siberian Yupik languages.

Siberian Yupik communities actively maintain their language as a symbol of cultural identity. A significant resource is the 2008 St. Lawrence Island/Siberian Yupik Eskimo Dictionary. This 10,000-entry work covers dialects from both Alaska and Russia. It records traditional spiritual terms alongside new vocabulary for technology and healthcare. The dictionary is a key educational tool for the younger generations.

== History ==
They are also known as Siberian or Eskimo (Russian: эскимосы). The name "Yuit" (юит, plural: юиты) was officially assigned to them in 1931 during a Soviet Union campaign to support indigenous cultures. Their self-designation is Yupiget (йупигыт), meaning "true people". Following this period, the Soviet government implemented a village relocation policy that closed dozens of traditional settlements, disrupted ancestral maritime mobility, and traditional social structures. In response, many community members are now in "spatial resistance" by reclaiming and reoccupying formerly closed settlement sites and hunting camps to reestablish a connection to their environment.

- The Great Reform: Between 1955 and 1960. Soviet authorities implemented a "Great Reform" to centralize the economy. This policy labeled smaller villages as "unpromising" and forced residents to move to larger hubs
- Closure of Naukan: In 1958, the ancient village of Naukan (Nuvuqaq) was closed. Its residents were relocated to various coastal villages, including Nunyamo and Pinakul, scattering the distinct Naukan community.
- Resettlement to New Chaplino: Residents of the historical village of Ungaziq (Old Chaplino) were moved to the new settlement of Novo Chaplino between 1957 and 1960. Unlike traditional coastal villages, Novo Chaplino is located at the head of a deep fjord (Tkachen Bay), which was an unusual location for Yupik maritime hunters.
- Loss of Cultural Heritage: This relocation period is often called the "End of Eskimo Land" because it broke the centuries-old connection between specific clans and their ancestral territories.

=== Traditional organization ===
The Siberian Yupik are organized into territorial groups called "tribes". These tribes are typically named after a main ancestral village using the suffix -miit (Ungazighmiit) for those from Ungaziq.

- Patrilineal Clans: Unlike many other Eskimo groups, the Siberian and St. Lawrence Island Yupik use a system of patrilineal clans called ramka. Members of these clans traditionally trace their descent through their father's line.
- Leadership Roles: Traditional villages are often led by two types of figures:
- Nunaleggtaq: The "master of the land" who serves as a ritual leader.
- Umiilek: A wealthy boat captain or "big boss" who manages trade and hunting crews.
- Marriage Customs: Marriage patterns include sister exchange and wife trading (spouse exchange). Polygamy, as well as the practices of levirate (marrying a sister's widower), were also common.

=== Trade ===
The Siberian Yupik communities maintained a long distance trade across the Bering Strait. The Siberian Yupik exchanged goods with both Alaskan Native groups and Russian traders from the eighteenth to the twentieth centuries.

== Material culture ==
Asian/Siberian Yupik settlements (in Russia and the USA)

=== Traditional crafts ===
The Siberian Yupik on St. Lawrence Island live in the villages of Savoonga and Gambell, and are widely known for their skillful carvings of walrus ivory and whale bone, as well as the baleen of bowhead whales. These even include some "moving sculptures" with complicated pulleys animating scenes such as walrus hunting or traditional dances.

=== Traditional tattoos ===
Traditional tattooing was practiced among the Siberian Yupik women and were marked for important life stages, cultural identity, and social roles within their community or clan. The practice declined during the late nineteenth and early twentieth centuries due to religion practices, but recently it has been making a comeback in recent years as part of Indigenous cultural revitalization.

=== Dwelling ===
The winter building of Chaplino Eskimos (Ungazighmiit) was a round, dome-shaped building. It is called yaranga in the literature, the same word referring also to the similar building of the Chukchi. In the language of Chaplino Eskimos, its name was /məŋtˈtəʁaq/. There was a smaller cabin inside it at its back part, the /aːɣra/, used for sleeping and living. It was separated from the outer, cooler parts of the yaranga with haired reindeer skins and grass, supported by a cage-like framework. But the household works were done in the room of the yaranga in front of this inner building, and also many household utensils were kept there. In winter storms, and at night also the dogs were there. This room for economical purposes was called /naˈtək/.

Other types of buildings among Chaplino Eskimos /aːwχtaq/ include a modernized type, and /pəˈɬʲuk/ that was used for summer.

=== Foraging and gathering edible plants ===
Central Siberian Yupik communities have traditionally identified and used at least twenty-nine species of edible plants in the northeastern Chukotka. The collection of botanical resources involves specialized tools and techniques developed to suit the Arctic environment. Many of these methods have remained consistent for centuries. Digging implements: To harvest edible roots, collectors traditionally use mattocks made from whole walrus tusks. Tusks from female walruses are often selected because they are typically smaller and more slender. Archaeological data from the Old Bering Sea culture indicate that these tool designs have been used for approximately two thousand years. Harvesting and Storage: Berries and leafy plants are gathered by hand. Foragers carry and store these items in various containers made from animal products, such as processed skin bags, cleaned walrus stomachs, or sealskin floats. Marine plant collection: Specialized tools are used to gather seaweed. A nakrutka is a weighted stick with a crossbar that is lowered from boats or through sea ice to twist and pull kelp from the seafloor. For shore-based gathering, a zakidushka is used, a weighted line thrown from the shore to snag and retrieve plants. Locating caches: In the autumn, harvesters may use a method called "trampling" to find winter root supplies that have been stored in the underground burrows of voles or mice.

== Spiritual culture ==
=== Shamanism ===
Many Indigenous Siberian cultures had persons working as mediator (between human and beings of the belief system, among others) — usually termed as "shamans" in the literature. As Eskimo cultures were far from homogeneous (although had some similarities), thus also shamanism among Eskimo peoples had many variants.

Siberian Yupiks had shamans as well. Compared to the variants found among Eskimo groups of America, shamanism among Siberian Yupiks stressed more the importance of maintaining good relationship with sea animals. Ungazighmiit people (the largest of Siberian Yupik variants) had /aˈliɣnalʁi/s, who received presents for the shamanizing, healing. This payment had a special name, /aˈkiliːɕaq/ — in their language, there were many words for the different kinds of presents and payments and this was one of them. (The many kinds of presents and the words designating them were related to the culture: fests, marriage etc.; or made such fine distinctions like "thing, given to someone who has none", "thing, given, not begged for", "thing, given to someone as to anybody else", "thing, given for exchange" etc.).

Becoming a Shaman individuals are often called to shamanism through unexpected spiritual encounters, such as hearing mysterious voices or seeing visions of spirit helpers in human or animal form, including killer whales or polar bears. These spirits propose a mutual relationship, offering supernatural assistance in exchange for offerings. Physical or psychological signs are also interpreted as a divine summons, which is then typically verified by an experienced shaman.

==== Fighting the spirit of smallpox ====
The Even people, a tribe that lived on the far eastern side of Russia, believed that the spirit of smallpox could be seen as a Russian woman with red hair. A local shaman would be there to greet migrating reindeer herders (who sometimes brought the disease with them). If the shaman saw the spirit of the disease in the caravan, several shaman worked together to fight it off with a seance. Others in the tribe helped with this ritual.

Tradition says that the smallpox spirit changed from a woman to a red bull when she was attacked. The spirit of smallpox was supposed to be very powerful, and if the shaman's ritual failed, all the local people would die. The spirit would only spare two people to bury all the rest. But if the ritual worked, the spirit would be forced to leave.

=== Name giving ===
Similar to several other Indigenous cultures, the name-giving of a newborn baby among the Siberian Yupik meant that a deceased person was affected, a certain rebirth was believed. This belief was so literal that the community treated the child as the actual returning individual, often addressing the infant using the kinship terms that applied to the deceased ancestor (such as a parent calling their child "grandfather").

Even before the birth of the baby, careful investigations took place where dreams and events were analyzed. After the birth, the baby's physical traits were compared to those of the deceased person to confirm this connection. The name was important: if the baby died, it was thought that he/she has not given the "right" name. In case of sickness, it was hoped that giving additional names could result in healing, as illness was often viewed as a sign that the spirit had been incorrectly identified.

=== Amulets ===
Amulets could be manifested in many forms, and could protect the person wearing them or the entire family, and there were also hunting amulets. Some examples:

- a head of raven hanging on the entrance of the house, functioning as a familiar amulet;
- figures carved out of stone in shape of walrus head or dog head, worn as individual amulets;
- hunting amulets were attached to something or worn. About the effigy of orca on the tools of the marine hunter, see the beliefs concerning this particular marine mammal below.

=== Concepts regarding the animal world ===
The orca, wolf, raven, spider, whale, were revered animals. Also folklore (e.g. tale) examples demonstrate this. For example, a spider saves the life of a girl. The motif of spider as a benevolent personage, saving people from peril with its cobweb, lifting them up to the sky in danger, is present also in many tales of Sireniki Eskimos (as mentioned, their exact classification inside Eskimo peoples is not settled yet).

It was thought that the prey of the marine hunt could return to the sea and become a complete animal again. That is why they did not break the bones, only cut them at the joints.

==== Orca and wolf ====
In the tales and beliefs of this people, wolf and orca are thought to be identical: orca can become a wolf or vice versa. In winter, they appear in the form of wolf, in summer, in the form of orca. Orca was believed to help people in hunting on the sea — thus the boat represented the image of this animal, and the orca's wooden representation hang also from the hunter's belt. Also small sacrifices could be given to orcas: tobacco was thrown into the sea for them, because they were thought to help the sea hunter in driving walrus. It was believed that the orca was a help of the hunters even if it was in the guise of wolf: this wolf was thought to force the reindeer to allow itself to be killed by the hunters.

==== Whale ====
It is thought that during the hunt, only those who have been selected by the spirit of the sea could kill the whale. The hunter has to please the killed whale: it must be treated as a guest. Just like a polite host does not leave a recently arrived dear guest alone, thus similarly, the killed whale should not be left alone by the host (i.e. by the hunter who has killed it). Like a guest, it should not get hurt or feel sad. It must be entertained (e.g. by drum music, good foods). On the next whale migration (whales migrate twice a year, in spring to the north and in the autumn back), the previously killed whale is sent off back to the sea in the course of a farewell ritual. If the killed whale was pleased to (during its being a guest for a half year), then it can be hoped that it will return later, thus the future whale hunts will succeed.

=== Celestial concepts ===
In a tale, the sky seems to be imagined arching as a vault. Celestial bodies form holes in it: beyond this vault, there is an especially light space.

== Religion ==
Compared with the Alaskan Native communities in the late nineteenth and early twentieth centuries, Siberian Yupik communities had less contact with Christian missionaries. Their religious practices began to change during the early Soviet period after the Russian Revolution of 1917, particularly during the 1920s and 1930s. During the 1920s, Protestant missionary interest from Alaska increased, and services were sometimes held on boats or in temporary tents.

== See also ==
- Siberian Yupik language
- Yupik languages
- Yupik
- Eskimo
- Naukan people of the Chukchi Peninsula
- Eskimo yo-yo
- Whistled language
