= National Register of Historic Places listings in Nome Census Area, Alaska =

Location of the Nome Census Area in Alaska

This is a list of the National Register of Historic Places listings in Nome Census Area, Alaska.

This is intended to be a complete list of the properties and districts on the National Register of Historic Places in Nome Census Area, Alaska, United States. The locations of National Register properties and districts for which the latitude and longitude coordinates are included below, may be seen in a Google map.

There are 20 properties and districts listed on the National Register in the census area, including 3 National Historic Landmarks. Another property was once listed but has been removed.

This National Park Service list is complete through NPS recent listings posted April 24, 2026.

== Current listings ==
	Name on the Register	Image	Date listed	Location	City or town	Description
1	Anvil Creek Gold Discovery Site	Anvil Creek Gold Discovery Site	October 15, 1966 (#66000159)	About 4.25 miles (6.84 km) north of Nome, along Anvil Creek; 64°33′13″N 165°25′26″W	Nome	Also a contributing site to Cape Nome Mining District Discovery Sites.
2	Jacob Berger House		August 3, 1977 (#77000219)	308 2nd Avenue; 64°29′57″N 165°24′33″W	Nome	
3	Bureau of Indian Affairs Unalakleet School	Bureau of Indian Affairs Unalakleet School	May 22, 2002 (#02000536)	Along E Street and F Street, west of Main Road; 63°52′18″N 160°47′16″W	Unalakleet	
4	Cape Nome Mining District Discovery Sites	Cape Nome Mining District Discovery Sites	June 2, 1978 (#78000535)	Nome Beach Site, Anvil Creek Gold Discovery Site, Snow Creek Placer Claim No. 1 and Erik Lindblom Placer Claim; 64°32′58″N 165°24′46″W	Nome	
5	Cape Nome Roadhouse	Cape Nome Roadhouse	December 12, 1976 (#76000361)	Mile 14 of Nome-Council Highway; 64°26′33″N 164°58′38″W	Nome	
6	Council City and Solomon River Railroad	Council City and Solomon River Railroad	March 2, 2001 (#01000109)	Mile 31 of Nome-Council Highway; 64°32′46″N 164°26′12″W	Solomon	
7	Discovery Saloon	Discovery Saloon	April 3, 1980 (#80000759)	Corner of West Lomen Avenue and West D Street; 64°29′58″N 165°24′53″W	Nome	
8	Fort St. Michael	Fort St. Michael	November 10, 1977 (#77000221)	Vicinity of St. Michael; 63°28′42″N 162°02′23″W	St. Michael	
9	Gambell Sites	Gambell Sites	October 15, 1966 (#66000160)	Address restricted	St. Lawrence Island	
10	Iyatayet Site	Iyatayet Site	October 15, 1966 (#66000158)	Northwestern shore of Cape Denbigh on Norton Bay	Cape Denbigh Peninsula	
11	Erik Lindblom Placer Claim		November 21, 1976 (#76000362)	About 6 miles (9.7 km) northwest of Nome; 64°35′10″N 165°26′08″W	Nome	Also a contributing site to Cape Nome Mining District Discovery Sites.
12	Norge Storage Site		October 9, 1974 (#74000441)	Front Avenue; 65°15′43″N 166°21′40″W	Teller	Warehouse where remains of the Arctic airship Norge were stored after its 1926 overflight of the North Pole.
13	Old St. Joseph's Catholic Church	Old St. Joseph's Catholic Church	March 8, 2000 (#00000149)	Across Bering Street, in front of West Seppala Drive; 64°30′00″N 165°24′28″W	Nome	
14	Pilgrim Hot Springs	Pilgrim Hot Springs	April 11, 1977 (#77000223)	About 8 miles (13 km) south of Mile 65 of Kougarok Road; 65°05′34″N 164°55′23″W	Teller	
15	St. Michael Redoubt Site	St. Michael Redoubt Site	November 10, 1977 (#77000222)	Address restricted	St. Michael	
16	Snow Creek Placer Claim No. 1		September 28, 1976 (#76000363)	About 6.5 miles (10.5 km) north of Nome; 64°35′49″N 165°24′26″W	Nome	Also a contributing site to Cape Nome Mining District Discovery Sites.
17	Solomon Roadhouse	Solomon Roadhouse	September 17, 1980 (#80000760)	Mile 32 of Nome-Council Highway; 64°33′31″N 164°26′34″W	Solomon	
18	Swanberg Dredge	Swanberg Dredge	March 12, 2001 (#01000232)	Mile 1 of Nome-Council Highway; 64°29′33″N 165°21′58″W	Nome	
19	Teller Mission Orphanage		October 21, 2001 (#01001117)	Corner of Post Officer Road and Tuksuk Street; 65°19′57″N 166°29′10″W	Brevig Mission	Building no more standing since 2015. (Note: Cfr. "Aerial view of Brevig Mission". September 2015. and modern satellite imagery with maps present in "NRHP nomination for Teller Mission Orphanage". National Park Service. and "Brevig Mission Local Economic Development Plan" (PDF). January 9, 2014. p. 18.)
20	Wales Sites	Wales Sites	October 15, 1966 (#66000161)	Address restricted	Wales	

== Former listing ==
	Name on the Register	Image	Date listed	Date removed	Location	City or town	Description
1	Lt. C. V. Donaldson	Lt. C. V. Donaldson	April 11, 1977 (#77000220)	January 3, 1990	Southern tip of Belmont Point; 64°30′05″N 165°25′25″W	Nome	Wreck no more present on the beach.
2	Carrie McLain House		December 19, 1978 (#78000534)	June 4, 1990	Belmont Point	Nome	

== See also ==
- List of National Historic Landmarks in Alaska
- National Register of Historic Places listings in Alaska
