= Stuart Island, Alaska =

Island in Alaska, United States

Coordinates: 63°35′23″N 162°31′51″W

- Location within Alaska

Geography
- Adjacent to: Norton Sound
- Area: 52.195 sq mi (135.18 km^{2})
- Length: 9.3 mi (15 km)
- Width: 6.2 mi (10 km)

Administration
- United States
- State: Alaska
- Borough: Unorganized Borough
- Census area: Nome Census Area

Demographics
- Population: 0 (2000)

Stuart Island (Qikertarpak in Yup'ik, ‘the big island’; Inupiaq: Qikiqtaqpak) is an island on the southeast side of the Norton Sound of Alaska. The island is about 9.3 miles (15.0 km) long and 6.2 miles (10.0 km) wide with a land area of 52.195 square miles (135.18 km^{2}) and had no resident population at the 2000 census. The name "Stuart's Island" was given during the third voyage of James Cook in September 1778.

Stuart Island has no permanent settlements, but is only a short distance by water from Stebbins, which is on neighboring St. Michael Island. Stuart Island is home to an unmanaged herd of reindeer put there as part of the Stebbins/St. Michael Reindeer Corral Project.

Stuart Island collects a significant amount of driftwood, due to its location North and East of the Upper Yukon River Delta. Spring runoff brings trees and logs down the Yukon River that, after reaching the Bering Sea, are pushed by wind and tides into Norton Sound. Stuart Island is directly in the path of the driftwood pushed into the Sound, and its west-facing beaches provide a traditional firewood supply for residents of Stebbins.
