= Alaska Native Industries Cooperative Association =

- Type: Retailers' cooperative
- Founded: 1947
- Headquarters: Seattle
- Website: https://anicainc.com/

The Alaska Native Industries Cooperative Association (ANICA) is a retailers' cooperative operating in rural Alaska, serving Alaskan native villages. As of the Association's 2018 biennial report, ANICA had 40 member stores.

== Background ==
In 1934, the 73rd United States Congress passed the Indian Reorganization Act. Among other goals, the Act was intended to help Native Americans achieve a greater measure of self-governance and economic self-sufficiency than was possible under previous legislation. Included in the act was a provision for the creation of a revolving credit fund for the advancement of Native business ventures. However, an oversight in the legislation prevented Native Americans in Alaska from taking full advantage of the new law. In 1936, the Alaska Native Reorganization Act was passed, extending the Indian Reorganization Act to cover Alaskan Natives.

The extreme difficulties associated with supplying remote villages in Alaska, as well as supply issues caused by World War II caused federal officials in the Bureau of Indian Affairs to conclude that a new organization was required to ensure those villages would remain well-supplied. In addition to improving economic conditions, the organization transferred responsibility for the supply programs to the Alaskan natives.

== Foundation and early operations ==
Louis Peters and Albert Huber led the government's efforts to create such an organization. Ultimately, the villages of White Mountain, Shaktoolik, Stebbins, Eli, and Unalakleet adopted bylaws and articles of association in 1947, formally creating the ANICA. The Association's Board of Directors had one representative from each member village. Additionally, non-member villages could make deposits with ANICA and receive services. In order to take advantage of economies of scale, a decision was made to postpone commencing operations until at least 25 villages stores had joined the co-op. This feat was achieved in 1948. By the end 1958, 37 villages stores were members of the co-op, and another 7 had made deposits with ANICA. ANICA made use of the revolving credit fund provided by the Indian Reorganization and Alaska Native Reorganization acts.

In addition to supplying remote village stores, ANICA attempted to stimulate exports in native craft goods and furs. The Association bought native art and craft goods on consignment and transferred them to the Alaska Native Arts and Crafts Clearing House, another BIA sponsored organization, for re-sale. In another instance of encouraging exports, ANICA purchased whale and seal oil from natives in Point Hope, and shipped oil to Seattle for sale to soap makers. Ultimately, such exports were discontinued. A program of mining coal in the Point Hope region for re-sale to other Alaskan villages was also considered, but never implemented.

ANCIA has published two periodicals. The first, ANICA Flash, was published from (probably) 1949 to 1954. In addition to carrying news about the various member stores and villages, ANICA Flash also had some economic news, and prices for various goods. ANICA News Highlights was published later, starting in March 1969 and running to December 1974. In addition to carrying news from the villages, the ANICA News Highlights also carried other news of interest to the remote villages it served, such as energy and shipping issues and economic trends. It also posted details on meetings of the ANICA board of directors, and reprinted segments from the earlier ANICA Flash newsletter.

== Modern organization ==
ANICA filed articles of incorporation in the State of Alaska on January 6, 1970, becoming a perpetual cooperative corporation. In 1990, the association established a scholarship fund for high school seniors in member villages. Modern efforts of ANICA focus on providing basic food stuff and goods to remote communities.
