= Norton Bay =

Coordinates: 64.5°N 162.0°W

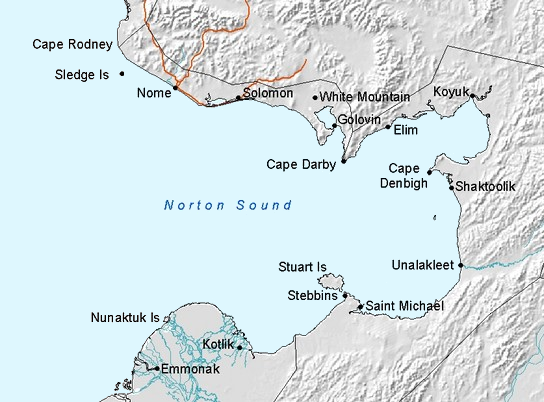
Norton bay in northeast part of Norton Sound

Norton Bay (Kaŋiiqusuk in Inupiaq) is a waterway classified bay located on the northeastern part of the Norton Sound, on the Seward Peninsula in the Nome Census Area of the Bering Sea of the U.S. state of Alaska. The mouths of several rivers debouch at Norton Bay, including the Kwik, Kwiniuk, and Tubutulik rivers.

The name Norton was assigned in 1859 by the Coast Survey. Norton Bay and Norton Sound were discovered as one entity by Captain James Cook in 1778, and named after Sir Fletcher Norton (who later became Lord Grantley), who was the speaker of the House of Commons of Great Britain.

== Geography ==
The north shore of the bay is in front of the Kwiktalik Mountain (1,200 feet (370 m)) in Seaward Peninsula. The Reindeer Hills lie on the Southhead of the Bay. Cape Nome is at the entrance to the bay. Circa 1902, there were several Alaska Native villages on the northern shore of the Norton Bay: Kviguk and Kwik villages. The streams joining the north shore of the bay are Kvingak, Kwik, Kwiniuk, and also Tubutulik River (an Inuktitut name given in 1849 by Temenkof). Captain Mikhail Dmitrievich Tebenkov was the director of the Russian American Company and Governor of Russian America during 1845–50. In 1831, he visited the Norton Sound and discovered the bay that bears his name.

== Geology ==
The inference, based on field studies, is that the Nulato-Norton Bay region evolved during the Cretaceous period. It is seen in the form of old deposits of conglomerates, sandstone and shales in the middle of the basin.

== Placer gold ==
Placer gold deposits are very few in the Nulato-Norton Bay area in some pockets of Cretaceous and Tertiary deposits as compared to the finds in the Nome area. Some of the streams such as the Kwintuk, Tubutulik and Kwik which flow into the bay have placer gold and the sediment flow discharged into the bay could also be a source of gold in the bay.

== Aqua fauna ==
Marine and other species reported from the bay have been a source of sustenance for the people of the area. The species reported are tomcod (a small fish) and herring. The hair of the seals caught from the bay area were woven into a fur cloth and the skin of the ogruk, a thick skinned seal, was used for making footwear worn by the Mukluk inhabitants of the area. Walrus has also been found is during the spring season which are caught and used as food.

== Landmarks ==
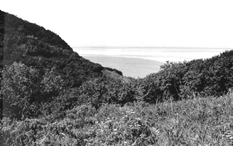
Archaeological site of Iyatayet site

The National Historic Landmark Iyatayet site is located on the northwest shore of Cape Denbigh on Norton Bay. Its historicity lies in the fact the Norton Culture dated between 500 BC and 300 AD existed at this site, in stratified deposits above the Denbigh Flint Complex of 6000-4000 BC. Remnants of artifacts found here have further added to the relationship that existed with the cultures of the Paleolithic and Mesolithic ages.

In 1840, at the mouth of Ukaliik River, part of the Norton Bay, a fort and a trading town (named after the river) had been established.

== Nature Reserve ==
The Norton Bay Nature Reserve was established in 1917 covering an area of about 350,000 acres (140,000 ha) for use by the US Bureau of Education and the Natives of the Indigenous Alaskan race. The area extends over a length of 110 miles (180 km) to the south east of Nome and covers the coastal area of Norton Bay. This area has the burial grounds of a large number of Eskimo natives who died due to epidemic diseases.

== See also ==
- Bering Straits Native Corporation, Alaska Native regional corporation that serves Norton Bay

== Bibliography ==
- Baker, Marcus (1902). Geographic Dictionary of Alaska. U.S. Government Printing Office. pp. 259–.
- Smith, Philip Sidney; Eakin, Henry Miner (1911). A geologic reconnaissance in southeastern Seward Peninsula and the Norton Bay-Nulato region, Alaska. Government Printing Office.
