= Vernetta M Nay Moberly =

American environmental activist

Vernetta M Nay Moberly (born December 23, 1955) is an American environmental activist who over time has gathered much information from the elders of the Iñupiat community (a group of Alaska Natives, whose traditional territory extends roughly northeast from Norton Sound in the Bering Sea to the northernmost part of the Canada–United States border between Alaska and Canada) and has passed on their knowledge to the next generation in an attempt to combat climate change.

The Iñupiat have been concerned about climate change threatening their traditional way of life. The tendency to warm the Arctic affects their lifestyle in many ways. For example, the thinning of sea ice makes it more difficult to hunt whales, seals, walruses and other traditional foods, as changes the migration patterns of marine mammals that depend on ice flows and the thinning of sea ice can cause people to fall through the ice. Warmer winters make travel more dangerous and less predictable as more storms form; later-forming sea ice contributes to increased flooding and erosion along the coast, as there is an increase in autumn storms, which directly endangers many coastal villages.

== Honors and awards ==
In 2020, Nay Moberly was named by the BBC as one of the 100 Women, a list of 100 inspiring and influential women from around the world.
