= Fort St. Michael =

- U.S. National Register of Historic Places
- Alaska Heritage Resources Survey
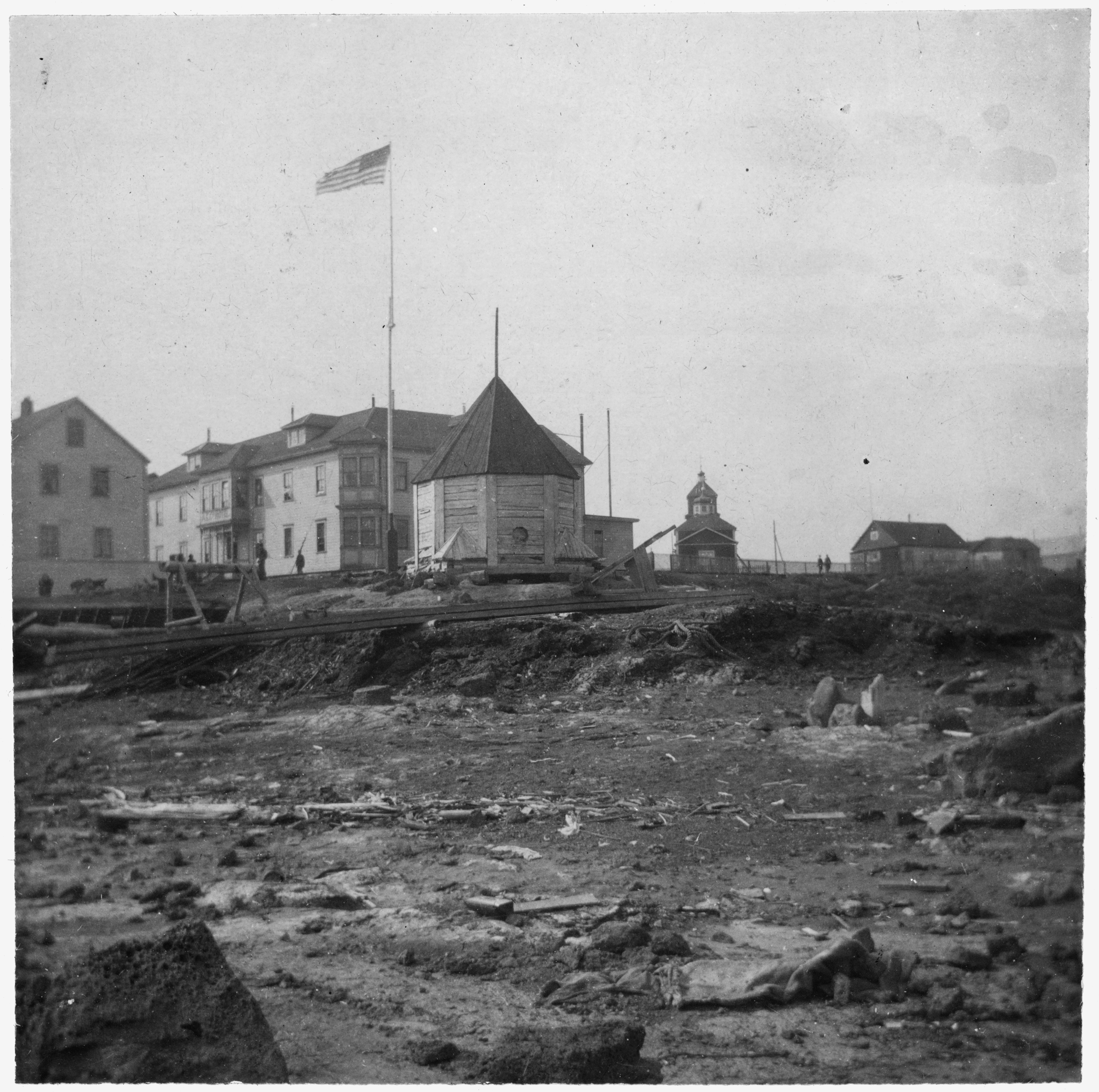
- Photo of St. Michael, 1901

- Location within Alaska
- Location: Vicinity of St. Michael, Alaska
- Coordinates: 63°28′42″N 162°02′23″W
- Area: 3 acres (1.2 ha)
- Built: 1897
- Built by: US Army
- NRHP reference No.: 77000221
- AHRS No.: SMI-015

Significant dates
- Added to NRHP: November 10, 1977
- Designated AHRS: January 1, 1976

Fort St. Michael was an installation of the United States Army at St. Michael, Alaska, on St. Michael Island in Norton Bay on the central west coast of Alaska. The fort was in active service between 1897 and 1925, and was originally established to maintain order during the Klondike Gold Rush for which St. Michael was a major transshipment point for people and goods moving up the Yukon River, whose mouth is nearby but is inaccessible to ocean-going ships. The installation later became the endpoint of the WAMCATS cable, a military communications cable extending across Alaska. Its importance declined substantially after the Alaska Railroad was completed in 1923, providing year-round service to the interior which was superior to the seasonal transport service of the river. The post was closed in 1925, and the military burials of its graveyard relocated to Sitka National Cemetery in 1929. When surveyed in 1976, only three buildings remained of the once extensive installation.

The surviving elements of the fort were listed on the National Register of Historic Places in 1977.

== Demographics ==
Historical population
Census	Pop.	Note	%±
1920	126		—

Fort Saint Michael appeared once on the 1920 U.S. Census as an unincorporated military installation. Owing to its deactivation in 1925, it was not reported separately again. It is presently located within the city of St. Michael.

== See also ==
- National Register of Historic Places listings in Nome Census Area, Alaska
