= St. Michael Island =

Island in Alaska, United States

Coordinates: 63°28′30″N 162°09′42″W

Location in Alaska

St. Michael Island is an island on the southeast side of the Norton Sound in Alaska. The island is about 9.3 miles (15.0 km) long and 6.2 miles (10.0 km) wide.

St. Michael Island contains two settlements, St. Michael, on the island's east side, and Stebbins, on the northwest side.

The population today is largely Yup'ik. Many residents are also descendants of the Russian traders

== History ==
Redoubt St. Michael was founded in 1833 by traders of the Russian-American Company, as a trading post for trade with the Yup'ik people of the area. The trading settlement and the island were named after the archangel Michael.

Fort St. Michael, a U.S. military post, was established in 1897. During the gold rush of 1897, it was a major gateway to the Alaskan interior via the Yukon River Delta (located about 40 miles (64 km) to the southwest). As many as 10,000 persons were said to live in St. Michael during the gold rush. St. Michael was also a popular trading post for Alaska Natives to trade their goods for Western supplies. Centralization of many Yup'iks from the surrounding villages intensified after the measles epidemic of 1900 and the influenza epidemic of 1918.
