= St. Michael Redoubt Site =

Archaeological site in Alaska, United States

- U.S. National Register of Historic Places
- Alaska Heritage Resources Survey
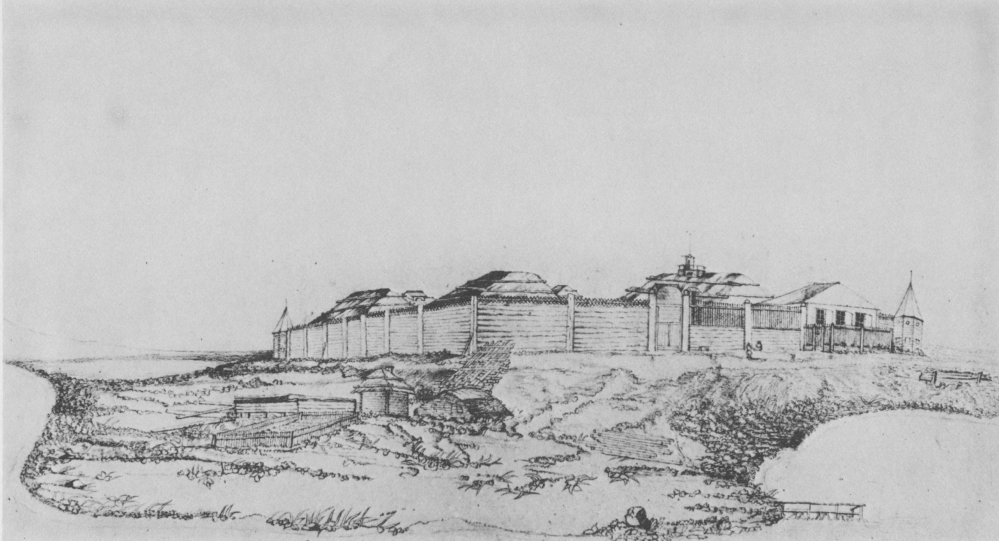
- Drawing of the redoubt, c. 1843, by I. G. Voznesenskii
- Location: Address restricted
- Nearest city: St. Michael, Alaska
- Area: 0.3 acres (0.12 ha)
- Built: 1833
- NRHP reference No.: 77000222
- AHRS No.: SMI-014
- Added to NRHP: November 10, 1977

St. Michael Redoubt was a fortified trading and supply post established by the Russian-American Company in 1833, at the location of what is now the city of St. Michael, Alaska. It is located on the southern shore of Norton Sound at a convenient location near the mouth of the Yukon River. The fort, established by order of Ferdinand Wrangel, was used in following decades as a logistics point for exploration of southwestern Alaska and the Alaskan interior via the Yukon and other rivers.

The archaeological remains of the redoubt are located in the city of St. Michael. They were listed on the National Register of Historic Places in 1977.

== See also ==
- National Register of Historic Places listings in Nome Census Area, Alaska
- Russian colonization of North America
