= Iyatayet site =

Archaeological site in Alaska, United States

- Iyatayet Site
- U.S. National Register of Historic Places
- U.S. National Historic Landmark
- Alaska Heritage Resources Survey
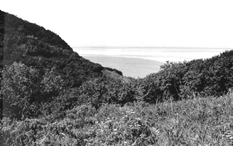
- View of the site
- Location: Address restricted, Nome Census Area, Alaska, USA
- Nearest city: Shaktoolik, Alaska
- NRHP reference No.: 66000158
- AHRS No.: NOB-002

Significant dates
- Added to NRHP: October 15, 1966
- Designated NHL: January 20, 1961

The Iyatayet Site is an archaeological site and National Historic Landmark located on the northwest shore of Cape Denbigh on Norton Bay in Nome Census Area, Alaska. It shows evidence of several separate cultures, dating back as far as 6000 B.C. It was excavated starting in 1948 by J. Louis Giddings, the pioneering archaeologist of the area. It is significant as the type site of the Norton culture, representative of human occupation c. 500 B.C.-500 A.D., first described by Giddings in 1964. It is also significant for the Denbigh Flint complex, which lay underneath the Norton materials, and provides evidence of some of the earliest human activity in the region. The site was declared a National Historic Landmark in 1961.

== Description ==
The Iyatayet Site is located on both sides of Iyatayet Creek, near its mouth on the northwest side of Cape Denbigh, a peninsular projection into Norton Bay, on the central-west coast of Alaska. The site has a complex series of depositions, which begin with a Nukleet (Thule) tradition settlement, identified by a series of depressions. Beneath this layer Giddings found a house pit which had been dug into older cultural materials. Both the house pit and the older materials became the type site for the Norton tradition, which lasted roughly from 1000 BC to 800 AD, and the site also has some elements of the older Arctic small tool tradition. Organic finds in these layers were relatively sparse, including ivory barbed weapon heads, toggling harpoon heads, and fragmentary tool blades. Decorative ivory finds included a doll figure. Stone artifacts were more numerous, with evidence of toolmaking (debitage) as well as projectile heads and stone knives. Pottery was also found, which was largely utilitarian and unornamented. Giddings interpreted the house site to be a winter accommodation, with its occupants engaged in seal hunting and fishing, with some efforts at caribou hunting as well.

The site was examined by Giddings in 1948, but not formally written up by him until the 1960s; he referred to it as the "Denbigh Flint Complex".

== See also ==
- List of National Historic Landmarks in Alaska
- National Register of Historic Places listings in Nome Census Area, Alaska
