= Mary Pete =

Yup'ik anthropologist and educator

Mary Ciuniq Pete
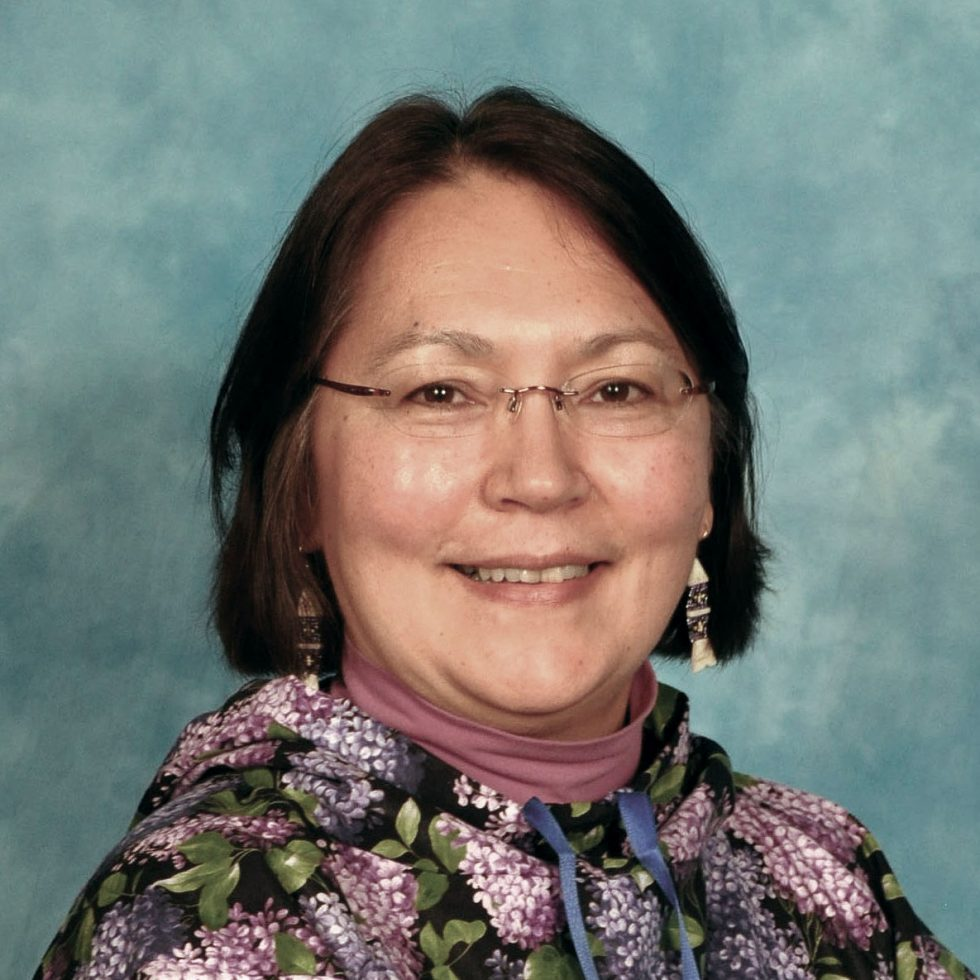
- Official United States Arctic Research Commission portrait of Pete
- Born: April 1957; Stebbins, Alaska, US
- Died: November 17, 2018 (aged 61); Anchorage, Alaska
- Known for: Studies of Yup'ik language and culture, legal work relating to subsistence rights in Alaska
- Spouse: Hubert Angaiak
- Children: 2

Mary Ciuniq Pete (April 1957 – November 17, 2018) was an American educator and anthropologist. From 1996 to 2005 she was the director of the Alaska Department of Fish and Game's Subsistence Division, and from 2010 to 2017 she was a member of the United States Arctic Research Commission. She also worked for the University of Fairbanks at various points in her life, including as director of a satellite campus. For her work in education, subsistence policies, and role in forming a degree program in the Yup'ik language, she was inducted into the 2019 Alaska Women's Hall of Fame.

== Early life ==
Mary Ciuniq Pete was born in April 1957 in Stebbins, Alaska and adopted by George and Jeanette Pete. She was Yup'ik, and while she was growing up her family practiced a subsistence lifestyle. She attended the University of Alaska Fairbanks, and graduated in 1984 with a master's degree in anthropology.

== Career ==
In 1984, she was hired by the Alaska Department of Fish and Game's Subsistence Division as a "resource specialist". In December 1995, she was appointed by Tony Knowles as director of the division. Upon her start in 1996, she became the first woman, and the first Alaska Native woman to assume the role, which Kristi Shallenberger of Alaska Public Media called a "huge achievement". As part of her job, she took part in the negotiations for the Yukon River Salmon Treaty between the US and Canada. Pete resigned from the position in 2005 when she became the director of the University of Alaska Fairbanks' Kuskokwim campus. While at UAF, she helped create a degree program in the Yup'ik language, of which she was a speaker. She was also the dean of the University's College of Rural and Community Development.

In 2010, she was appointed to the United States Arctic Research Commission and re-appointed in 2013. She served in the role until 2017.

Pete was also involved in organizations studying or advocating for the victims of domestic violence and sexual abuse. She was on the Alaska State Council on Domestic Violence and sexual assault. During the 1980s, she worked on the board of the Tundra Women's Coalition, and in 1986 was appointed as a member of the Alaska Women's Commission. In 1992, she was interviewed as an expert witness in a sexual assault trial, where she clarified that the Yup'ik practice of ing'ruk was not sexual act, but rather a display of affection where older Yu'pik members would sniff or kiss a child. In 2004, she criticized the Jesuit minister who oversaw missions in Alaska for his comments claiming that Alaska Native people, in particular the Yup'ik people, were "fairly loose" with sexual contact, and thus Yup'ik children molested by a Jesuit minister would be less traumatized when compared to children from other cultures. Pete characterised his interpretation of Yup'ik culture as "ridiculous" and questioned how the minister, as an anthropologist, had come to that conclusion.

Pete was an advocate of subsistence rights in Alaska. She stated that she believed restrictions on subsistence rights would disproportionately affect rural Alaskan women, who she believed were not adequately represented during the creation of subsistence-related policies.

== Personal life and death ==
Pete and her husband, Hubert Angaiak, adopted two children. Pete died at Providence Hospital on November 17, 2018 from issues related to ovarian cancer.

In 2019, she was inducted into the Alaska Women's Hall of Fame for her work in education, including her role in creating a Yup'ik language degree, and Arctic related policies such as those concerning subsistence.
