= Bureau of Indian Affairs Unalakleet School =

- U.S. National Register of Historic Places
- Alaska Heritage Resources Survey
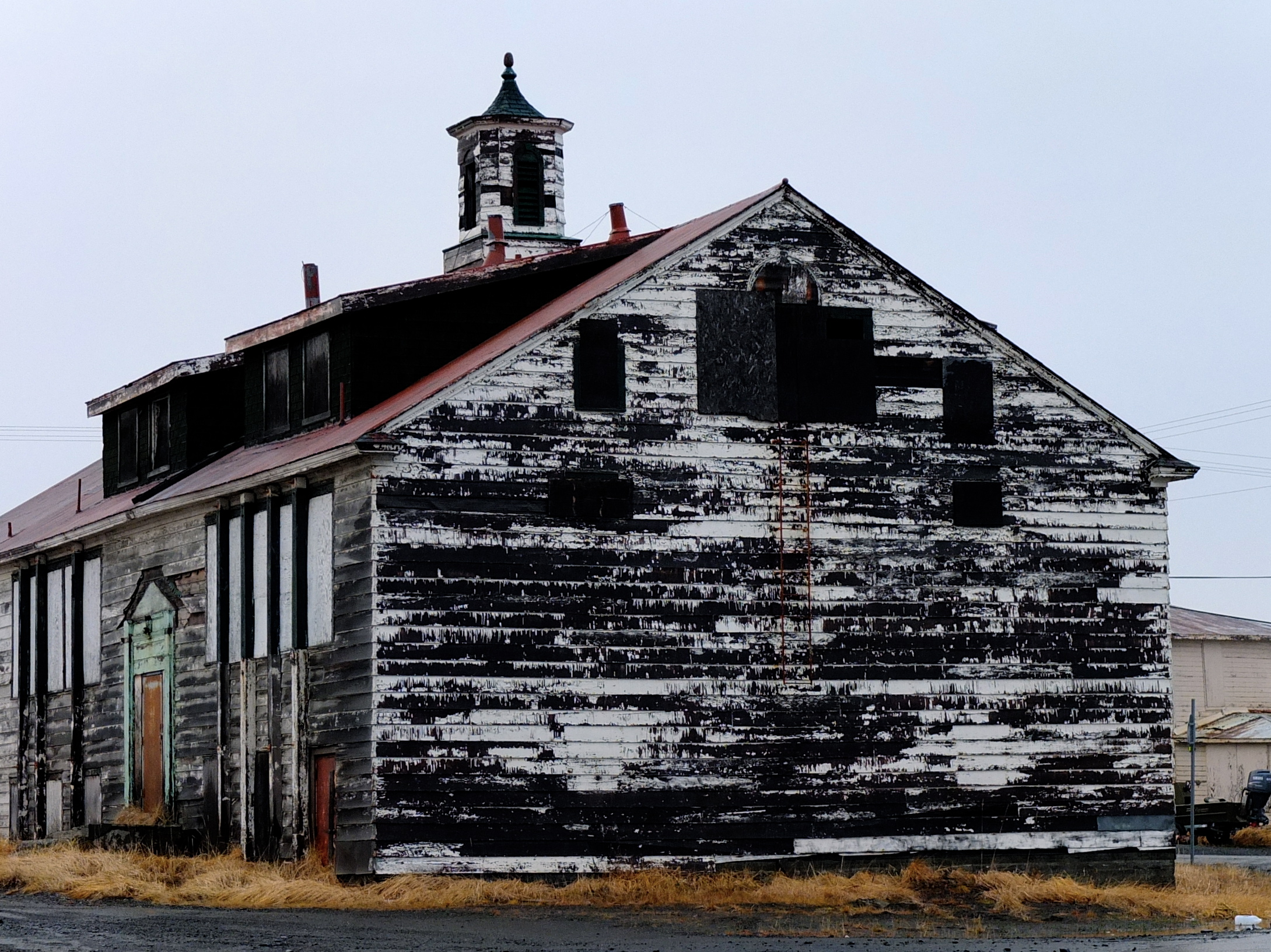

- Location within Alaska
- Location: Along E Street and F Street, west of Main Road, Unalakleet, Alaska
- Coordinates: 63°52′18″N 160°47′16″W
- Area: 1 acre (0.40 ha)
- Built: 1933
- NRHP reference No.: 02000536
- AHRS No.: UKT-00055
- Added to NRHP: May 22, 2002

The Bureau of Indian Affairs Unalakleet School, also known as the Unalakleet Day School and BIA School and Quarters, is a historic school complex in Unalakleet, Alaska, a small community about 150 miles (240 km) southeast of Nome at the mouth of the Unalakleet River. The complex includes the main school building, a light plant, a warehouse and the former Teacher's Quarters, Clinic's Quarters and Duplex Quarters across 2nd Street. The school building is a Georgian Revival structure, 2 1/2 stories in height, built in 1933 with balloon framing, a gable roof with octagonal cupola, and a concrete foundation. Shed-roof dormers were added in 1937, and an addition in 1954. The building housed classrooms and other facilities on the first two floors, and two small apartments in the attic space (the latter part of the 1937 work). The school was built by the United States Bureau of Indian Affairs as part of a major program to assimilate Alaska's Native population, and was operated from these premises until 1978, when the state built a new school.

The school was listed on the National Register of Historic Places in 2002.

== See also ==
- National Register of Historic Places listings in Nome Census Area, Alaska
