= Shaktoolik, Alaska =

Shaktoolik Saktuliq (Inupiaq) Cagtuleq (Central Yupik)
- City
- Location in Alaska
- Coordinates: 64°21′20″N 161°11′29″W
- Country: United States
- State: Alaska
- Census Area: Nome
- Incorporated: October 7, 1969

Government
  - Mayor: Edgar Jackson, Sr.
  - State senator: Donald Olson (D)
  - State rep.: Neal Foster (D)

Area
  - Total: 1.08 sq mi (2.79 km^{2})
  - Land: 1.07 sq mi (2.77 km^{2})
  - Water: 0.0077 sq mi (0.02 km^{2})
- Elevation: 23 ft (7 m)

Population (2020)
  - Total: 212
  - Density: 198.6/sq mi (76.67/km^{2})
- Time zone: UTC-9 (Alaska (AKST))
  - Summer (DST): UTC-8 (AKDT)
- ZIP code: 99771
- Area code: 907
- FIPS code: 02-68890
- GNIS feature ID: 1669434

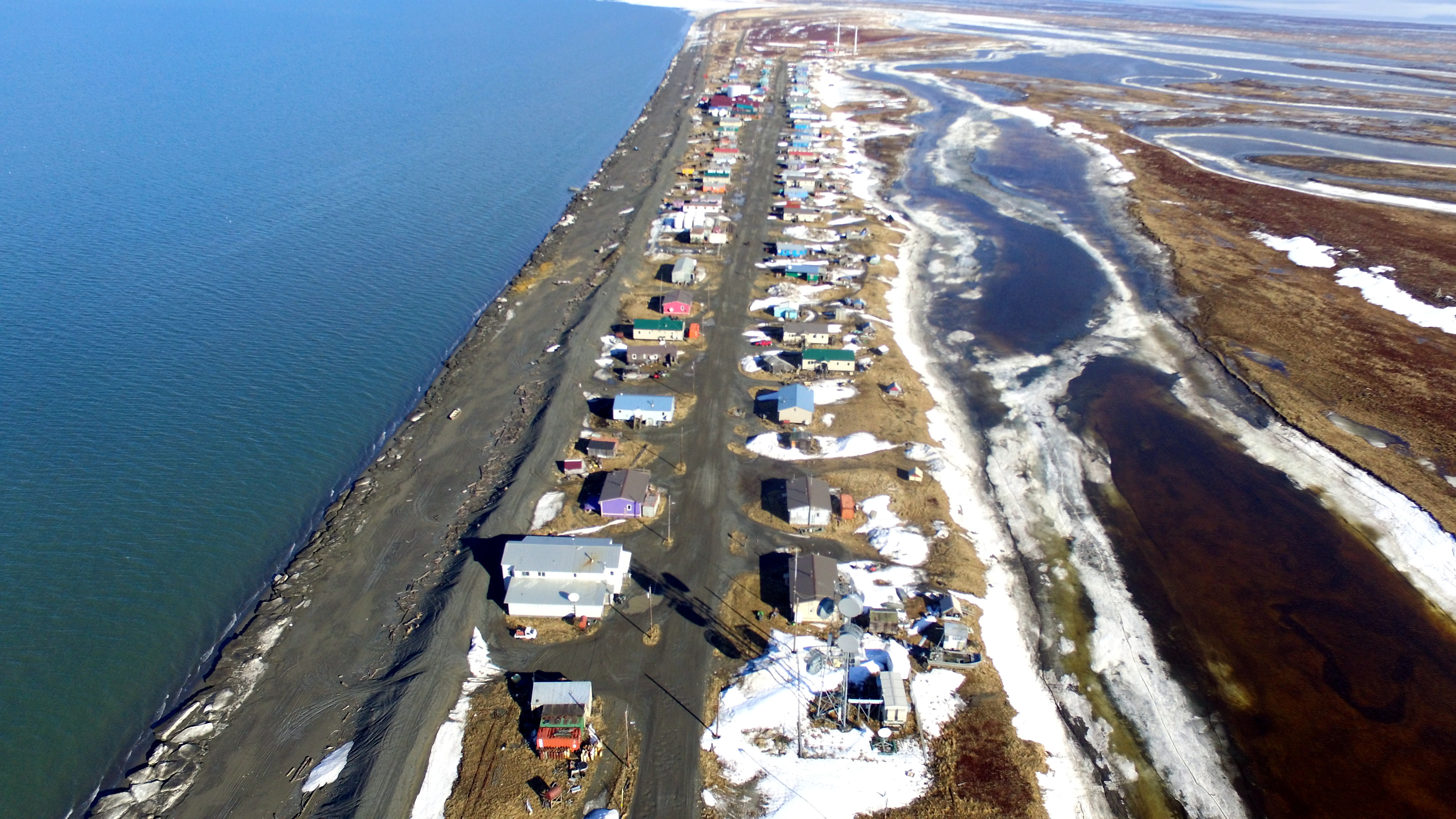
Shaktoolik Alaska - Drone Photo

Shaktoolik (Inupiaq: Saktuliq, IPA: [sɑktuleq]; Central Yupik: Cagtuleq) is a city in Nome Census Area, Alaska, United States. As of the 2020 census, Shaktoolik had a population of 212. Shaktoolik is one of a number of Alaskan communities threatened by erosion and related global warming effects. The community has been relocated twice.

== History ==
According to the Alaska Dept. of Community and Economic Development, Shaktoolik was the first and southernmost Malemiut settlement on Norton Sound, occupied as early as 1839. Twelve miles northwest, on Cape Denbigh, is the Iyatayet site that is 6,000 to 8,000 years old, and listed on the National Register of Historic Places. Shaktoolik was first mapped in 1842–1844 by Lt. Lavrenty Zagoskin, Imperial Russian Navy, who called it "Tshaktogmyut." "Shaktoolik" is derived from an Unaliq word, "suktuliq", meaning "scattered things".

Reindeer herds were managed in the Shaktoolik area around 1905. The village was originally located six miles up the Shaktoolik River, and moved to the mouth of the River in 1933. This site was prone to severe storms and winds, however, and the village relocated to its present, more sheltered location in 1967. There are presently only two occupied dwellings at the old townsite. The City was incorporated in 1969.

== Geography ==
Shaktoolik is located at 64°21′20″N 161°11′29″W.

According to the United States Census Bureau, the city has a total area of 1.1 square miles (2.8 km^{2}), all of it land.

According to the State of Alaska, Department of Community and Economic Development, Shaktoolik is located on the east shore of Norton Sound. It lies 125 miles east of Nome and 33 miles north of Unalakleet. It lies at approximately 64.333890° North Latitude and -161.153890° West Longitude. (Sec. 23, T013S, R013W, Kateel River Meridian.) Shaktoolik has a subarctic climate with maritime influences when Norton Sound is ice-free, usually from May to October. Summer temperatures average 47 to 62; winter temperatures average -4 to 11. Extremes from -50 to 87 have been recorded. Average annual precipitation is 14 inches, including 43 inches of snowfall.

== Demographics ==
Historical population
Census	Pop.	Note	%±
1880	60		—
1890	38		−36.7%
1920	73		—
1930	104		42.5%
1940	128		23.1%
1950	127		−0.8%
1960	187		47.2%
1970	151		−19.3%
1980	164		8.6%
1990	178		8.5%
2000	230		29.2%
2010	251		9.1%
2020	212		−15.5%
U.S. Decennial Census

Shaktoolik first appeared on the 1880 U.S. Census as the unincorporated Inuit village of "Shaktolik." All 60 of its residents were Inuit. It returned in 1890 as "Shaktolit." All 38 of its residents were native. It next appeared on the 1920 census as "Shakolik." In 1930 and 1940, it returned as "Shaktolik." In 1950, it again returned as "Shaktolik" with the alternative spelling of Shaktoolik, the first time the present spelling appeared. In 1960, it reverted to "Shaktolik" and incorporated under the name in 1969. In 1980, it appeared under the present spelling again, Shaktoolik, and has continued to in every successive census.

=== 2020 census ===
As of the 2020 census, Shaktoolik had a population of 212. The median age was 35.5 years. 28.8% of residents were under the age of 18 and 6.1% of residents were 65 years of age or older. For every 100 females there were 82.8 males, and for every 100 females age 18 and over there were 86.4 males age 18 and over.

0.0% of residents lived in urban areas, while 100.0% lived in rural areas.

There were 77 households in Shaktoolik, of which 54.5% had children under the age of 18 living in them. Of all households, 53.2% were married-couple households, 11.7% were households with a male householder and no spouse or partner present, and 26.0% were households with a female householder and no spouse or partner present. About 10.4% of all households were made up of individuals and 0.0% had someone living alone who was 65 years of age or older.

There were 85 housing units, of which 9.4% were vacant. The homeowner vacancy rate was 0.0% and the rental vacancy rate was 0.0%.

Racial composition as of the 2020 census
Race	Number	Percent
White	20	9.4%
Black or African American	4	1.9%
American Indian and Alaska Native	185	87.3%
Asian	1	0.5%
Native Hawaiian and Other Pacific Islander	0	0.0%
Some other race	0	0.0%
Two or more races	2	0.9%
Hispanic or Latino (of any race)	1	0.5%

=== 2000 census ===
As of the census of 2000, there were 230 people, 60 households, and 48 families residing in the city. The population density was 216.7 inhabitants per square mile (83.7/km^{2}). There were 66 housing units at an average density of 62.2 per square mile (24.0/km^{2}). The racial makeup of the city was 5.22% White, 94.35% Native American, and 0.43% from two or more races.

Of the 60 households, 53.3% had children under the age of 18 living with them, 58.3% were married couples living together, 8.3% had a female householder with no husband present, and 20.0% were non-families. 16.7% of all households were made up of individuals, and none had someone living alone who was 65 years of age or older. The average household size was 3.83 and the average family size was 4.42.

In the city, the age distribution of the population shows 39.1% under the age of 18, 12.2% from 18 to 24, 25.7% from 25 to 44, 16.5% from 45 to 64, and 6.5% who were 65 years of age or older. The median age was 24 years. For every 100 females, there were 123.3 males. For every 100 females age 18 and over, there were 122.2 males.

The median income for a household in the city was $31,875, and the median income for a family was $35,000. Males had a median income of $30,313 versus $37,917 for females. The per capita income for the city was $10,491. None of the families and 6.1% of the population were living below the poverty line, including no under eighteens and 18.8% of those over 64.

=== Economy ===
The Shaktoolik economy is based on subsistence, with some part-time wage earnings. Cash jobs include commercial fishing and jobs with the City and the school. Reindeer herding also provides income and meat. Fish, crab, moose, beluga whale, caribou, seal, rabbit, geese, cranes, ducks, ptarmigan (including their eggs), berries, greens, and roots are also primary subsistence food sources.

== Education ==
Shaktoolik is served by Shaktolik School, a pre-K–12 school in the Bering Strait School District. During the school year the students of Shaktoolik have the opportunity to join sports. In the late fall there is cross country running, wrestling and volleyball. The most popular sport is basketball, which is played throughout the early winter months. Near the end of the school year the Native Youth Olympics (NYO) takes place. All the students involved in sports form a team, which travels around the Bering Strait School District (BSSD)

== Notable people ==
- Ticasuk Brown (1904–1982), Educator and writer was born in Unalakleet and wrote about it extensively in her autobiography. Her father was one of the co-founders of the village.
- Félix Rodríguez de la Fuente (1928–1980), Spanish naturalist and broadcaster, died in Shaktoolik on March 14, 1980, while shooting a documentary about the Iditarod Trail Sled Dog Race, when the Cessna 185 aircraft carrying him along with two Spanish cameramen and the American pilot crashed, killing all on board.
