= Eliot Staples Bering Sea Ice Golf Classic =

Golf tournament in Alaska

Eliot Staples Bering Sea Ice Classic
- Status: Active
- Genre: Sports event
- Date: Third Saturday of March
- Frequency: Annual
- Venue: Norton Sound
- Location: Nome, Alaska
- Coordinates: 64.4977°N 165.4089°W
- Country: United States
- Years active: 1983-present
- Inaugurated: 1983
- Founder: Eliot Staples
- Major events: Snow golf
- Sponsor: Lions Clubs International

The Eliot Staples Bering Sea Ice Classic is a snow golf tournament held annually on the third Saturday of March on frozen Norton Sound in Nome, Alaska. Founded in 1983, sixteen teams of four players participate. It has a $50 entry cost that contributes to a Lions Club scholarship fund. The course consists of six holes. Par is 42, and the lowest score that has been achieved, as of 2010, is 23. It coincides with the ending of the Iditarod Trail Sled Dog Race in the city. It is one of the northernmost golf tournaments in the world.

== History ==
The event was founded in 1983 by Eliot Staples, the namesake of the tournament.

The event is affected by the Arctic sea ice decline, as rising sea levels may cover up some parts of the golf course.

== Event ==
The course's fairway is 3 ft (0.91 m) of snow-covered ice. The putting green is a small carpet rolled over the uneven ice near each hole.

The event starts in mid-morning, behind the city's Breakers Bar. They tee off on Nome's seawall, using bright green or orange golf balls for easier visibility. Balls frequently roll into ice cracks or are lost in snow drifts. As the tournament is the only golfing event in the year, supplies are mostly reused or improvised. Many clubs are very rusty and shot glasses and shotgun shells are used for tees. The holes consist of dug-in coffee cans, less than 120 yd (110 m) apart. After the third hole, golfers take a break at the Polar Bar. It is an accepted practice to steal a partner's ball and make a lot of noise while someone is playing.

If a player hits a polar bear, they receive a three-stroke penalty. If a player successfully rescues the ball and survives, however, five strokes are subtracted.
