= Pilgrim Hot Springs =

Unincorporated community in the state of Alaska, United States

- U.S. National Register of Historic Places
- Alaska Heritage Resources Survey
- Location within Alaska
- Location: About 8 miles (13 km) south of Mile 65 of Kougarok Road
- Nearest city: Teller, Alaska
- Coordinates: 65°05′34″N 164°55′23″W
- Area: 318 acres (129 ha)
- Built: 1903
- NRHP reference No.: 77000223
- AHRS No.: BEN-014

Significant dates
- Added to NRHP: April 11, 1977
- Designated AHRS: January 27, 1975

Pilgrim Hot Springs is a ghost town in the interior of the Seward Peninsula of northwestern Arctic Alaska. Also known as Kruzgamepa, Kruzgamepa Springs and Unaatuq. It is located on the southeast bank of the Kruzgamepa River, about 8 miles (13 km) south of milepost 65 of the Kougarok Road, on the traditional lands of the Kauweramiut, also known as the People of Kauwerak, also known as people of the Village of Mary's Igloo and their descendants.

The location gained prominence in the early 20th century because of its thermal hot springs, which made agricultural homesteading possible, and which were adapted to provide a respite for the gold miners of Nome. Early buildings, built 1900–03, were of log construction, and included a log cabin, barn and chicken house. A roadhouse and saloon were built after 1903, but were destroyed by fire in 1908, after the mining boom had ended.

After the flu epidemic of 1918, the Roman Catholic Diocese of Nome built a large orphanage at the site, complete with a large church, dormitory and school, and living quarters for the staff, as well as greenhouses. These facilities were kept warm by water piped from the hot springs. The site was closed in 1941, but soon reopened as a recreational facility for the military, serving until the end of World War II. When surveyed in 1977 prior to listing on the National Register of Historic Places, the buildings on the site were in deteriorated condition. The site is owned by Unaataq LLC, a consortium of area Alaska native corporations which is working on development alternatives for the site, including power generation and tourism.

== Demographics ==
Historical population
Census	Pop.	Note	%±
1940	60		—
U.S. Decennial Census

Pilgrim Hot Springs only appeared on the 1940 U.S. Census as the unincorporated village of "Pilgrim Springs." It was reported that it was an "all-Eskimo" settlement at that time. It has not appeared on the census since.

== Location ==
Pilgrim Hot Springs are located on a gravel road northeast of Nome by about 60 miles. Guest parking is available.

== Indigenous use of the thermal mineral springs ==
The common name for the hot springs is "Pilgrim", however the historical Iñupiaq Qawiaraq name for the springs is Unaatuq, which translates to "warm waters." The hot springs have been used for thousands of years by the Iñupiat people who used the area for bathing and foraging for medicinal and edible plants. Settlers, miners, missionaries and colonizers began arriving 200 years ago; they were followed by the U.S. purchase of Alaskan territory in 1867. The treaty included the "subjugation of Indigenous sovereignty". In 1918, at the site of the hot springs, a school and orphanage was founded and built by the Jesuit father Bellarmine Lafortune. Later that year a supply ship brought influenza to the area that affected the Indigenous population. Their numbers dropped from 300 to 176 people who had died from influenza. Further colonization was one of the results of the epidemic; and the survivors were placed in missionary schools that effectively "stripped communities of their culture" and language. In 1941 the mission closed. Seventy years later, in 2010, the Fairbanks Catholic diocese sold the hot springs and surrounding property.

The hot springs are now owned and managed by five Native-led organizations along with two other non-Native organizations. This consortium of these seven organizations built three cabins, and several sites for tent camping as well as developing a new rock-lined soaking pool. The consortium members are: Bering Straits Native Corporation, Kawerak, Inc., Mary’s Igloo Native Corporation, Norton Sound Economic Development Corporation, Sitnasuak Native Corporation, Council Native Corporation, and the White Mountain Native Corporation. These operate under the governance of Unaatuq, LLC. with representation of the seven partner organizations that form its board of directors.

== Gallery ==
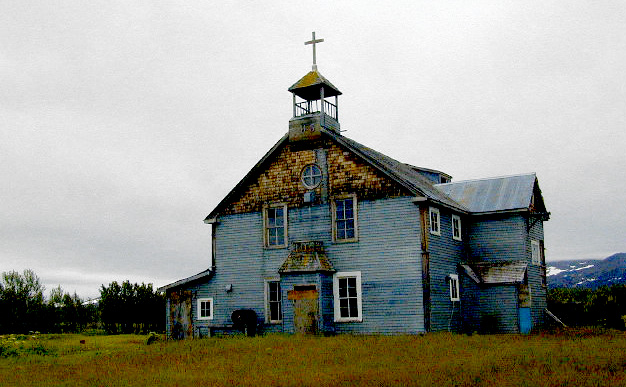
Abandoned church at Pilgrim Hot Springs

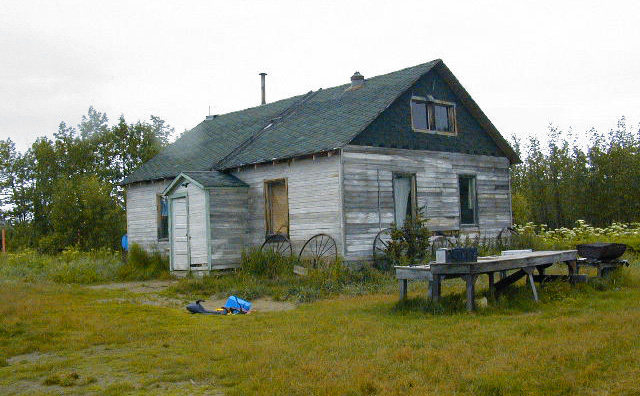
Building at Pilgrim Hot Springs

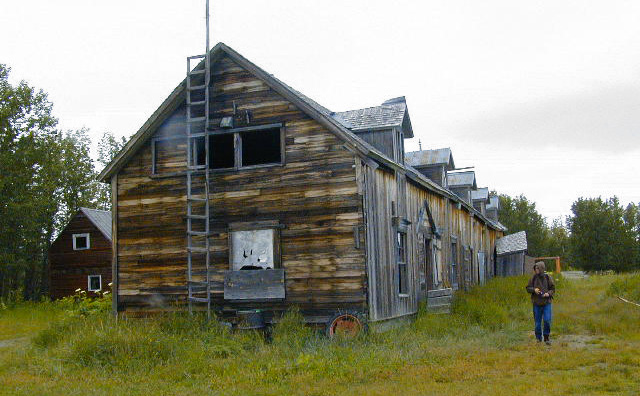
Former dormitory at Pilgrim Hot Springs

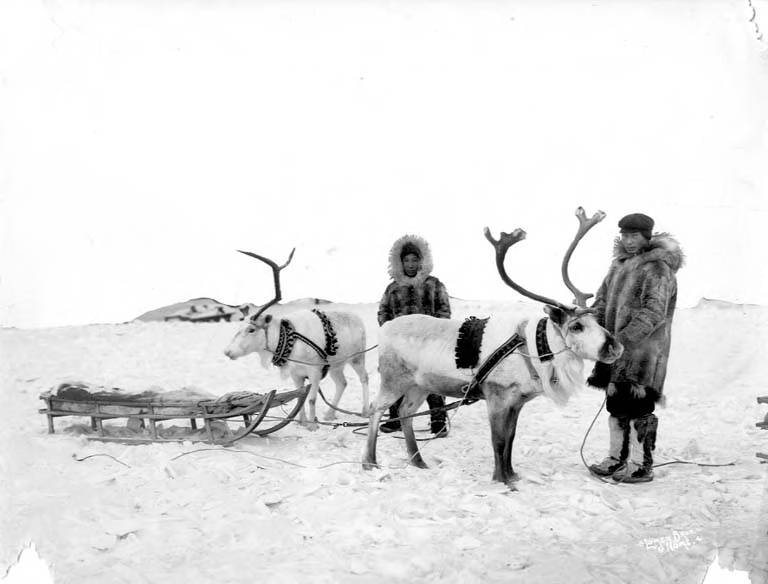
Two Iñupiat men with reindeer in decorated harnesses with sled on snowy field, Seward Peninsula, 1915-1917

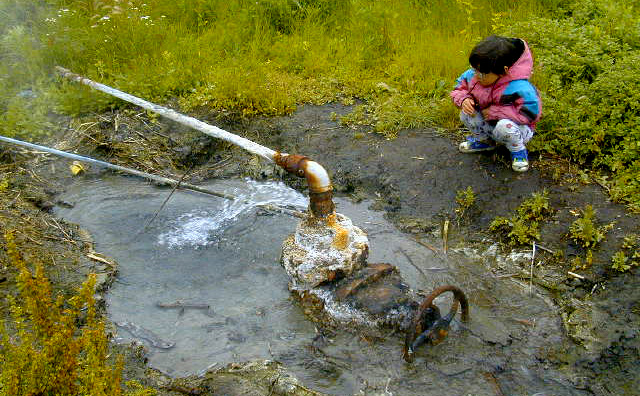
Geothermal wellhead at Pilgrim Hot Springs

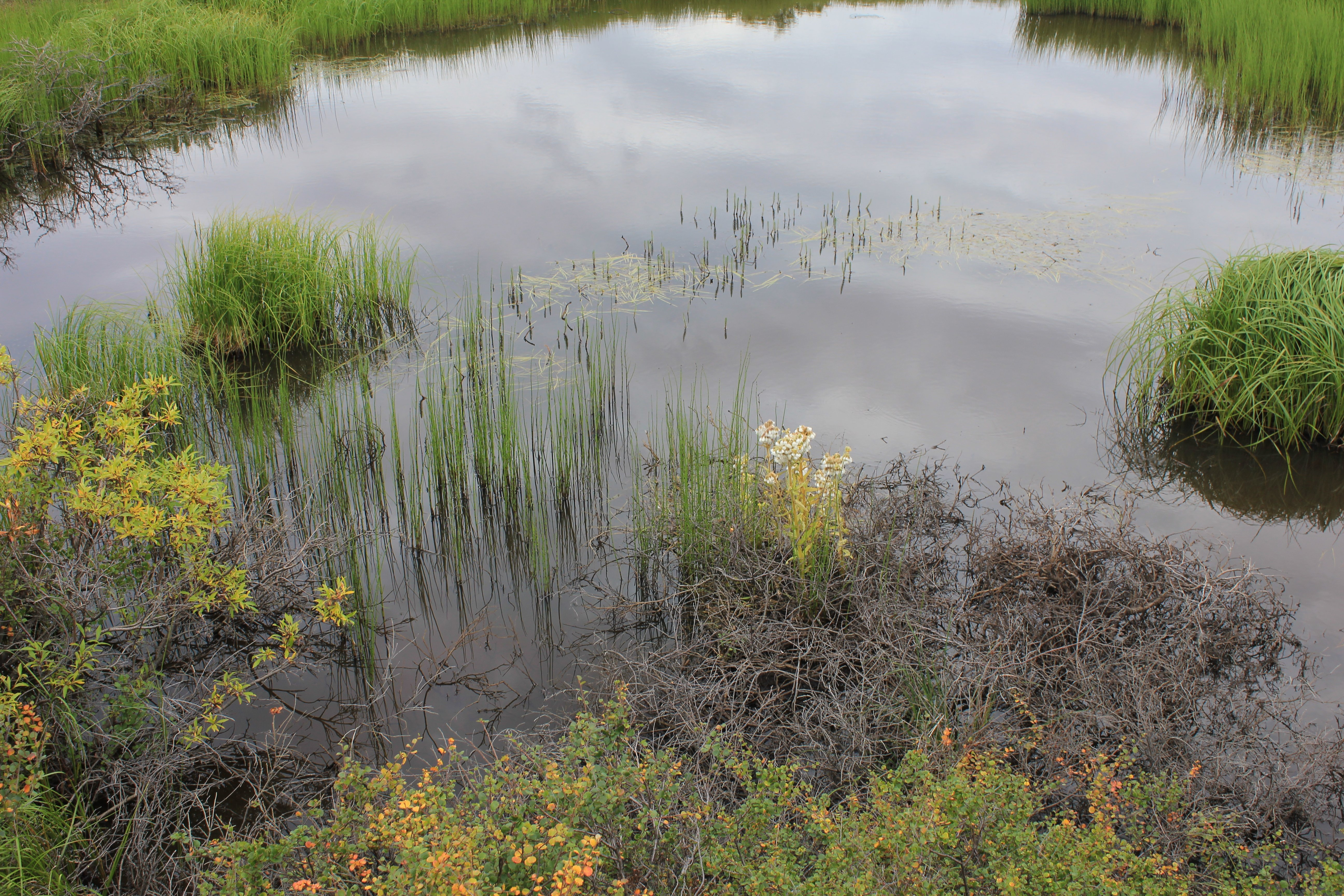
Thermo-karst thermo-karst melt pond adjacent to the road which accelerated the melting of permafrost near Pilgrim Hot Springs, Seward Peninsula

== See also ==
- National Register of Historic Places listings in Nome Census Area, Alaska
