= Nome National Forest =

Artificial forest in Alaska

- Location within Alaska
- Interactive map of Nome National Forest

Geography
- Coordinates: 64.4942°N 165.4009°W

Administration
- Established: Mid-1990s
- Authority: Charlie Lean

Nome National Forest is a seasonal artificial forest in Nome, Alaska. Containing 100 trees on average, it is planted on the frozen Norton Sound in early February and stays until the ice starts to melt. Other than trees, it also contains about 50 animal figures made from plywood. Charlie Lean, a resident of the town and member of its Rotary Club became keeper of the forest in 2016 and is helped by community volunteers.

The animals do not last very long and have to be remade every few years, sometimes by people from the Anvil Mountain Correctional Center. On especially cold days, the trees are placed in holes filled with water, which freezes the tree in. In the spring the trees are used to create a fish spawning habitat.

== History ==
The forest was initially created in the mid-1990s as a prank by Connie Madden, the editor of The Nome Nugget, and Nancy McGuire, Madden's friend. They wanted to trick visitors who traveled there for the Iditarod, gathering old Christmas trees and putting them on the ice. They continued it for the following years, adding a sign declaring it a national forest the first year after its founding.

The forest was not active for three years as both Madden and McGuire had died. Richard Beneville, the mayor of Nome, led the movement to revive the forest, allowing it to prop up again in 2016.
