= Stebbins, Alaska =

Stebbins Tapraq (Central Yupik) Tapqaq (Inupiaq)
- City
- Location in Alaska
- Coordinates: 63°30′43″N 162°16′29″W
- Country: United States
- State: Alaska
- Census Area: Nome
- Incorporated: July 15, 1969

Government
  - Mayor: Ward Walker.
  - State senator: Donald Olson (D)
  - State rep.: Neal Foster (D)

Area
  - Total: 34.13 sq mi (88.39 km^{2})
  - Land: 32.61 sq mi (84.45 km^{2})
  - Water: 1.52 sq mi (3.94 km^{2})
- Elevation: 16 ft (5 m)

Population (2020)
  - Total: 634
  - Density: 19.5/sq mi (7.51/km^{2})
- Time zone: UTC-9 (Alaska (AKST))
  - Summer (DST): UTC-8 (AKDT)
- ZIP code: 99671
- Area code: 907
- FIPS code: 02-72960
- GNIS feature ID: 1410158

Stebbins (Central Yupik: Tapraq, Inupiaq: Tapqaq; Atqa.wik) is a city in Nome Census Area, Alaska, United States. As of the 2020 census, Stebbins had a population of 634.

== Geography ==
Stebbins is located at 63°30′43″N 162°16′29″W (63.511893, -162.274632), on the north side of St. Michael Island, which is on the south side of the Norton Sound in western Alaska.

According to the United States Census Bureau, the city has a total area of 36.9 square miles (96 km^{2}), of which, 35.2 square miles (91 km^{2}) of it is land and 1.7 square miles (4.4 km^{2}) of it (4.71%) is water.

== Demographics ==
Historical population
| Census | Pop. | Note | %± |
|---|---|---|---|
| 1940 | 98 | | — |
| 1950 | 115 | | 17.3% |
| 1960 | 158 | | 37.4% |
| 1970 | 231 | | 46.2% |
| 1980 | 331 | | 43.3% |
| 1990 | 400 | | 20.8% |
| 2000 | 547 | | 36.8% |
| 2010 | 556 | | 1.6% |
| 2020 | 634 | | 14.0% |
U.S. Decennial Census

Stebbins first appeared on the 1940 U.S. Census as an unincorporated village. It formally incorporated in 1969.

=== 2020 census ===
As of the 2020 census, Stebbins had a population of 634. The median age was 24.9 years. 39.3% of residents were under the age of 18 and 7.4% of residents were 65 years of age or older. For every 100 females there were 104.5 males, and for every 100 females age 18 and over there were 110.4 males age 18 and over.

0.0% of residents lived in urban areas, while 100.0% lived in rural areas.

There were 181 households in Stebbins, of which 60.2% had children under the age of 18 living in them. Of all households, 33.1% were married-couple households, 27.1% were households with a male householder and no spouse or partner present, and 28.7% were households with a female householder and no spouse or partner present. About 19.9% of all households were made up of individuals and 5.0% had someone living alone who was 65 years of age or older.

There were 199 housing units, of which 9.0% were vacant. The homeowner vacancy rate was 0.0% and the rental vacancy rate was 7.6%.

Racial composition as of the 2020 census
| Race | Number | Percent |
|---|---|---|
| White | 31 | 4.9% |
| Black or African American | 3 | 0.5% |
| American Indian and Alaska Native | 577 | 91.0% |
| Asian | 0 | 0.0% |
| Native Hawaiian and Other Pacific Islander | 0 | 0.0% |
| Some other race | 1 | 0.2% |
| Two or more races | 22 | 3.5% |
| Hispanic or Latino (of any race) | 5 | 0.8% |

=== 2000 census ===
As of the census of 2000, there were 547 people, 123 households, and 104 families residing in the city. The population density was 15.6 inhabitants per square mile (6.0/km^{2}). There were 134 housing units at an average density of 3.8 per square mile (1.5/km^{2}). The racial makeup of the city was 5.12% White, 0.18% Black or African American, 93.97% Native American, and 0.73% from two or more races.

Of the 123 households, 64.2% had children under the age of 18 living with them, 47.2% were married couples living together, 11.4% had a female householder with no husband present, and 15.4% were non-families. 12.2% of all households were made up of individuals, and 0.8% had someone living alone who was 65 years of age or older. The average household size was 4.45 and the average family size was 4.86.

In the city, the age distribution of the population shows 47.2% under the age of 18, 12.4% from 18 to 24, 22.1% from 25 to 44, 13.7% from 45 to 64, and 4.6% who were 65 years of age or older. The median age was 20 years. For every 100 females, there were 115.4 males. For every 100 females age 18 and over, there were 114.1 males.

The median income for a household in the city was $23,125, and the median income for a family was $28,214. Males had a median income of $33,125 versus $20,000 for females. The per capita income for the city was $8,249. About 40.4% of families and 41.9% of the population were below the poverty line, including 45.5% of those under age 18 and 33.3% of those age 65 or over.

== Education ==
Stebbins is served by the Bering Strait School District. The Tukurngailnguq School served grades K through 12, and was the only school in town when it burned down on June 26, 2024. The Alaska Department of Public Safety released an incident report on the fire, but it did not identify the cause of the blaze. The community considered bussing students to nearby St. Michel to attend school there while a replacement school is built, however, the community and district opted to have temporary buildings constructed so that students could attend school as close to home as possible. Some temporary buildings were in place by fall of the 2024–25 school year, Due to limited space students attended a split day, with younger students attending in the morning and older students attending in the afternoon. Once additional buildings arrived, the school returned to full school days for all students. The temporary buildings include Quonset huts, Temporary Metal buildings, and Yurts. All school buildings have plumbing. The school still lacks a full size gym for basketball and volleyball. Plans have been approved for the new school and constructional work will begin summer 2026. It may take 3-5 years for construction to be complete, due to logistical issues, e.g., the city is not on the road system and all materials must be brought by barge, in the summer, or by plane in the winter (when the ocean is frozen)

== City government ==
A July 2019 report revealed that all city police officers, including the chief of police, have lengthy criminal records (including domestic violence), and only one has any training.

== History ==
A Russian fort, Redoubt St. Michael, was built at nearby St. Michael by the Russian-American Company in 1833. The name Stebbins was first recorded in 1900; the Yupik name for the village is Tapraq. The first census in the area, in 1950, listed 80 Yupiks residing in Stebbins. The city was incorporated in 1969.

The Stebbins economy depends on commercial fishing, for herring and other fish, and subsistence fishing, gardening and hunting, supplemented by part-time wage earnings. Hunting is for seal, walrus, caribou, and beluga whale. The city government, medical clinic and school of about 200 students provide the only full-time positions.

The Stebbins/St. Michael Reindeer Corral Project was completed in 1993 for a herd on Stuart Island, just north of Stebbins. The reindeer are currently unmanaged.

In September 2022, a storm caused significant flooding and property damage. A November 2022 fire destroyed the town's only store. In June 2024, a fire broke out in a shop close to the Tukurngailnguq School. The shop, the school, and several other nearby buildings were destroyed.

== Notable person ==
- Mary Pete, Yu'pik anthropologist and educator
