= Old St. Joseph's Catholic Church =

Historic church in Alaska, United States

- U.S. National Register of Historic Places
- Alaska Heritage Resources Survey
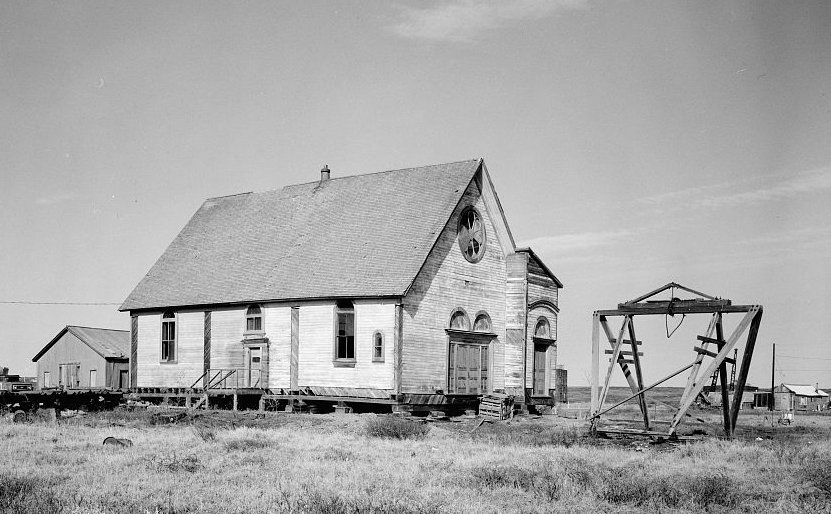
- The church in 1946, after the removal of its steeple

- Location within Alaska
- Location: Across Bering Street, in front of West Seppala Drive, Nome, Alaska
- Coordinates: 64°30′00″N 165°24′28″W
- Area: less than one acre
- Built: 1901
- Architect: J.B. Randell
- Architectural style: Late Gothic Revival
- NRHP reference No.: 00000149
- AHRS No.: NOM-00040
- Added to NRHP: March 8, 2000

Old St. Joseph's Catholic Church, now Old St. Joe's Hall, is a historic former church building at Anvil City Square in Nome, Alaska.

Designed by J.B. Randell of Seattle, Washington and built in 1901, it is one of the oldest buildings in the city. It is also the only wood-frame Gothic Revival church in Alaska, and is one of the most visible buildings in the city. Originally located at the corner of West King Place and Steadman Street, it served as a church until 1944. It fell into disrepair, resulting in the removal of its distinctive tall steeple. In 1995, it was given to the city, which moved it to Anvil City Square the following year and restored it. It now serves as a community hall.

The building is listed on the National Register of Historic Places since 2000.

== See also ==
- National Register of Historic Places listings in Nome Census Area, Alaska
