= Teller Mission Orphanage =

- U.S. National Register of Historic Places
- Alaska Heritage Resources Survey
- Location within Alaska
- Location: Corner of Post Officer Road and Tuksuk Street, Brevig Mission, Alaska
- Coordinates: 65°19′57″N 166°29′10″W
- Area: less than one acre
- Built: 1917
- NRHP reference No.: 01001117
- AHRS No.: TEL-00037
- Added to NRHP: October 21, 2001

The Teller Mission Orphanage was a historic orphanage and mission house located at the corner of Post Officer Road and Tuksuk Street in Brevig Mission, Alaska. This small community was established in 1891 as a station for the importation of reindeer from Siberia to supplement the diet of the local Alaska Native population. The reindeer station was taken over in 1900 by the Norwegian Evangelical Lutheran church, which also undertook to operate a school and orphanage at the site. The 1 1/2-story wood-frame building was built in 1917, replacing the original orphanage built in 1907 by Rev. Tollef Larson Brevig, for whom the community is named. It was about 28 by 54 feet (8.5 m × 16.5 m), with a gable roof, weatherboard siding, and a metal roof. At the time of its listing on the National Register of Historic Places in 2001, it had been standing vacant for about 20 years. The building is no longer standing as of September 2015. (Note: Cfr. and modern satellite imagery with maps present in and)

== See also ==
- National Register of Historic Places listings in Nome Census Area, Alaska
