= Norge Storage Site =

- U.S. National Register of Historic Places
- Alaska Heritage Resources Survey
- Location within Alaska
- Location: Front Avenue, Teller, Alaska
- Coordinates: 65°15′43″N 166°21′40″W
- Area: less than one acre
- Built: c. 1910
- NRHP reference No.: 74000441
- AHRS No.: TEL-021

Significant dates
- Added to NRHP: October 9, 1974
- Designated AHRS: 1970

The Norge Storage Site is a historic building in the small native city of Teller, Alaska. It is a two-story wood frame building with a false front, and a small single-story addition to the east. The building's notability lies with its association with the pioneering voyage of the dirigible Norge, which overflew the North Pole on May 11, 1926. Led by the Norwegian explorer Roald Amundsen and the airship's Italian designer and commander, Col. Umberto Nobile, the Norge flew from Ny-Ålesund, Spitsbergen, on May 10, and headed for Nome after crossing the pole. Due to adverse weather conditions, Nobile decided instead to land the Norge at Teller, about 72 miles (116 km) from Nome, landing on Front Avenue near this building. The airship was dismantled and stored here until a freighter could be sent to recover it. The components of the Norge were shipped back to Italy in crates for repairs and refurbishment which was never undertaken.

The building was listed on the National Register of Historic Places in 1974.

== See also ==
- National Register of Historic Places listings in Nome Census Area, Alaska
