= Jacob Berger House =

Historic house in Alaska, United States

- U.S. National Register of Historic Places
- Alaska Heritage Resources Survey
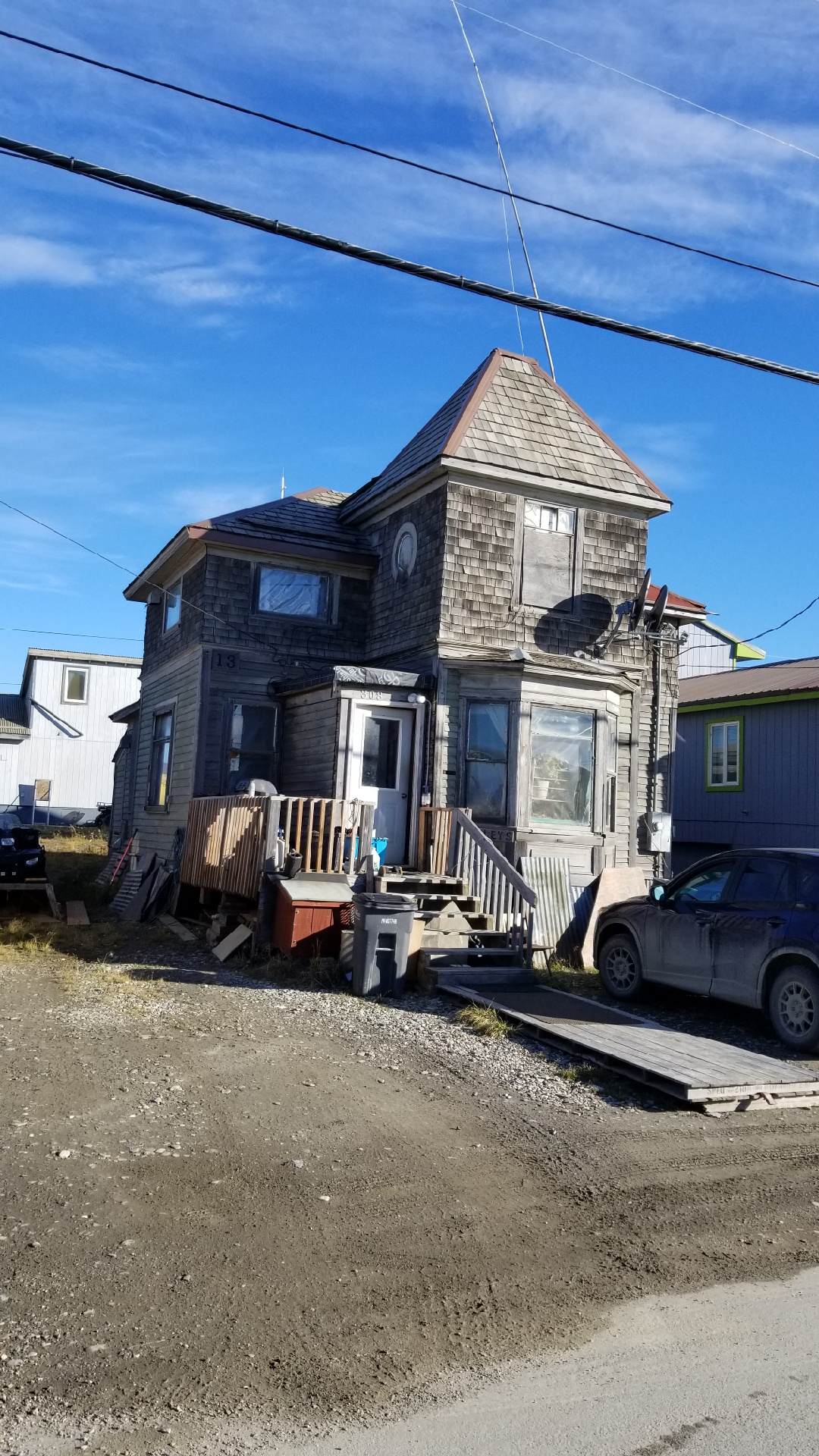

- Location within Alaska
- Location: 308 2nd Avenue, Nome, Alaska
- Coordinates: 64°29′57″N 165°24′33″W
- Area: less than one acre
- Built: 1904
- NRHP reference No.: 77000219
- AHRS No.: NOM-018

Significant dates
- Added to NRHP: August 3, 1977
- Designated AHRS: April 3, 1974

The Jacob Berger House, also known locally as the Sally Carrighar House, is a historic Gold Rush mansion at 308 2nd Avenue in Nome, Alaska. It is a two-story late Victorian house, built in 1903-04 by Jacob Berger, a miner who had at least three major finds during the Nome Gold Rush. It was built out of high quality material brought to Nome from west coast ports, and was based on a pattern from an architectural pattern book, with special adaptations for Nome's harsh climate. The main block of the house has a hip roof above a shortened second story, and has a square projecting section in the front which has a full-height second story and is topped by a pyramidal roof. The house is also unusual for the period for the size and number of windows it has.

The house was listed on the National Register of Historic Places in 1977.

== See also ==
- National Register of Historic Places listings in Nome Census Area, Alaska
