= Discovery Saloon =

Historic place in Alaska, United States

- U.S. National Register of Historic Places
- Alaska Heritage Resources Survey
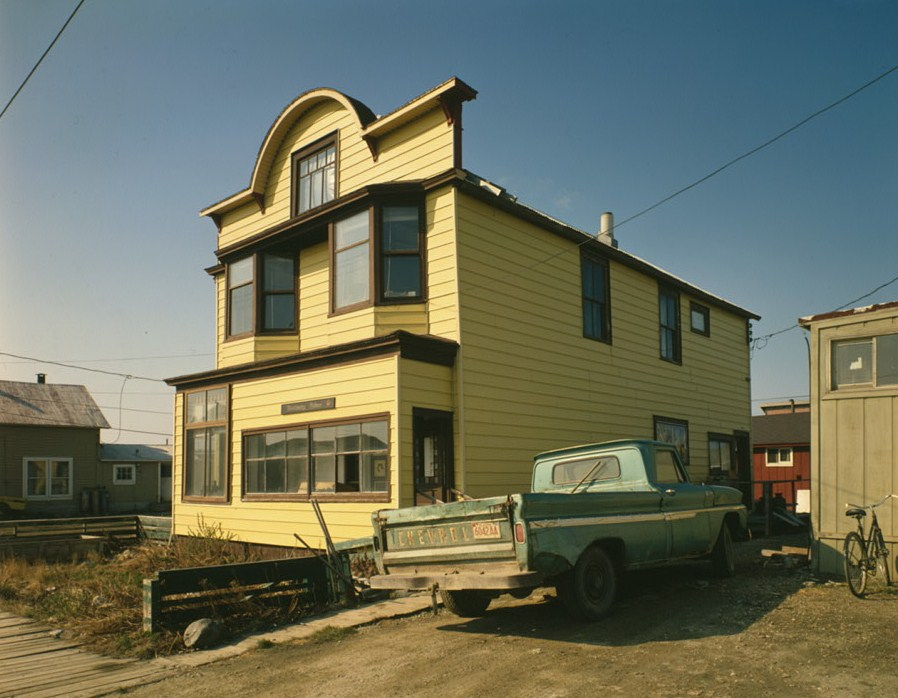
- HABS photo, 1981

- Location within Alaska
- Location: Corner of West Lomen Avenue and West D Street, Nome, Alaska
- Coordinates: 64°29′58″N 165°24′53″W
- Area: less than one acre
- Built: 1901
- Built by: Max Gordon
- NRHP reference No.: 80000759
- AHRS No.: NOM-042

Significant dates
- Added to NRHP: April 3, 1980
- Designated AHRS: August 17, 1977

The Discovery Saloon is a historic building at 1st and D Streets in Nome, Alaska. Now a private residence, this two-story wood-frame building with false front was built in 1901 by Max Gordon, who operated a high-end public establishment on the premises. It is the oldest commercial building in Nome, and one of the few to survive from Nome's gold rush days. It was converted to one of Nome's finest private residences in the 1940s.

The building was listed on the National Register of Historic Places in 1980.

== See also ==
- National Register of Historic Places listings in Nome Census Area, Alaska
