= Gambell Sites =

Archaeological site in Alaska, United States

- U.S. National Register of Historic Places
- Former U.S. National Historic Landmark
- Alaska Heritage Resources Survey
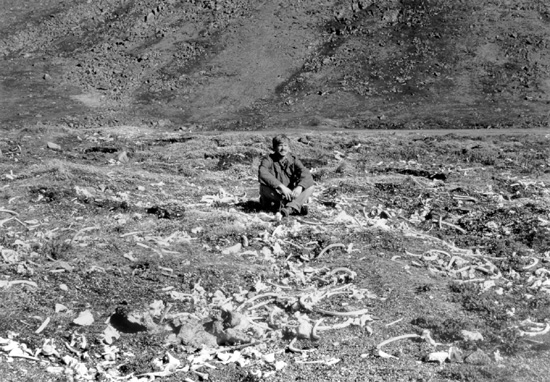
- One of the Gambell Sites
- Location: Address restricted, St. Lawrence Island, Alaska, USA
- Nearest city: Gambell, Alaska
- NRHP reference No.: 66000160
- AHRS No.: XLS-061

Significant dates
- Added to NRHP: October 15, 1966
- Designated NHL: 1962
- Delisted NHL: January 13, 1989

The Gambell Sites are five archeological sites which established a chronology of over 2000 years of human habitation on St. Lawrence Island near Gambell, Alaska.

The sites (named Hillside, Mayughaaq, Ayveghyaget, Old Gambell, and Seklowaghyag) have provided evidence of four cultural phases of the Thule tradition. Digging first began in 1927 and the sites were labelled a National Historic Landmark in 1962. As with all previously existing National Historic Landmark sites, the sites were listed on the National Register of Historic Places when the registry opened in 1966.

Over the 20th century, the archeological value of the sites was largely destroyed due to locals digging up the buried ivory and the landmark designation was withdrawn in 1989. The sites remain listed on the National Register.

== See also ==
- National Register of Historic Places listings in Nome Census Area, Alaska
