= Cape Denbigh =

Cape in Alaska, United States

Coordinates: 64°22′52″N 161°32′03″W

Cape Denbigh is located on the Seward Peninsula in Eastern Norton Sound in the U.S. state of Alaska. It is notable for the Iyatayet site, an Archaic stage hunter-gatherer archaeological site. The headland is a moderately high, rounded hill, joined to the mainland by a low, narrow neck. The head of the bight, eastward of the cape, is shoal, but in approaching the water shoals gradually. A good anchorage in northeasterly winds can be had eastward of the cape. The water shoals rapidly inside a depth of 4 fathoms when approaching the shore.
