= Denbigh Flint complex =

Paleo-Inuit archaeological culture

The Denbigh Flint complex was a Paleo-Inuit archaeological entity identifiable by distinctive lithic material culture that was active in Alaska and northwestern Canada from 4,000 to 3,300 years before present (2450 to 1450 BC). They were the first members of the wide material assemblage known as the Arctic Small Tool tradition. Sites attributed to the Denbigh Flint complex mostly inhabited northern Alaska from Cape Krusenstern to the western Yukon, but sites have also been found further to the south, from the Aleutian islands and mainland Alaska. The Denbigh Flint complex likely were descendants from the Syalakh and Bel’kachi cultures of Siberia. They engaged in wide-scale trade, as evidenced by the transport of pieces of obsidian across distances over 500 km. Sites that exhibit tools typical of the Denbigh Flint complex evidence a hunter-gatherer lifestyle based around both maritime and terrestrial resources: their primary food was caribou, which they hunted year-round—although they made seasonal visits to the coast to hunt seals. Denbigh peoples also fished, picked berries, and hunted birds in the fall.

Denbigh sites in Alaska (shown in yellow)

== Archaeological sites ==
As of 2016, there are 140 archaeological sites that were inhabited by members of the Denbigh Flint Complex. One of the major sites is the Iyatayet site, which was where the Denbigh Flint complex was discovered. These people would have spent the wintertime on the shores of lakes in the tundra or in forested areas, where they inhabited semi-subterranean houses. In other seasons, they occupied both interior and coastal locations in tents placed around a stone hearth.

== Tools ==
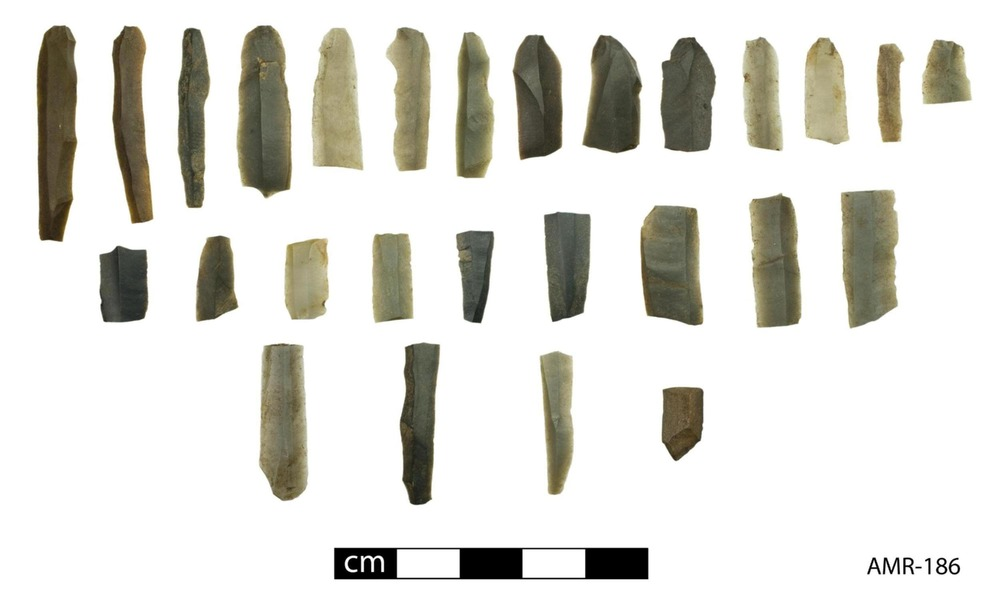
Denbigh microblades

These sites are classified as belonging to the Denbigh Flint complex because they share similar tool technologies. Stone tools were highly specialized and were finely sharpened. This is evidenced by the tool chip byproducts found at sites and the large number of different types of blades. The archaeologist Andrew H. Tremayne states that:

“[Denbigh Flint complex] technology employed multiple core reduction and tool-blank production strategies that include bifacial cores, unpatterned flake cores, and blade and microblade cores, which taken together facilitated production of many different specialized tools from a limited supply of raw material. The diminutive size of many of the finished tools is optimal for transportability and maximum edge utility”

— Andrew H. Tremayne, The Denbigh Flint Complex of Northern Alaska, page 12
