= Norge (airship) =

Italian polar-expedition airship

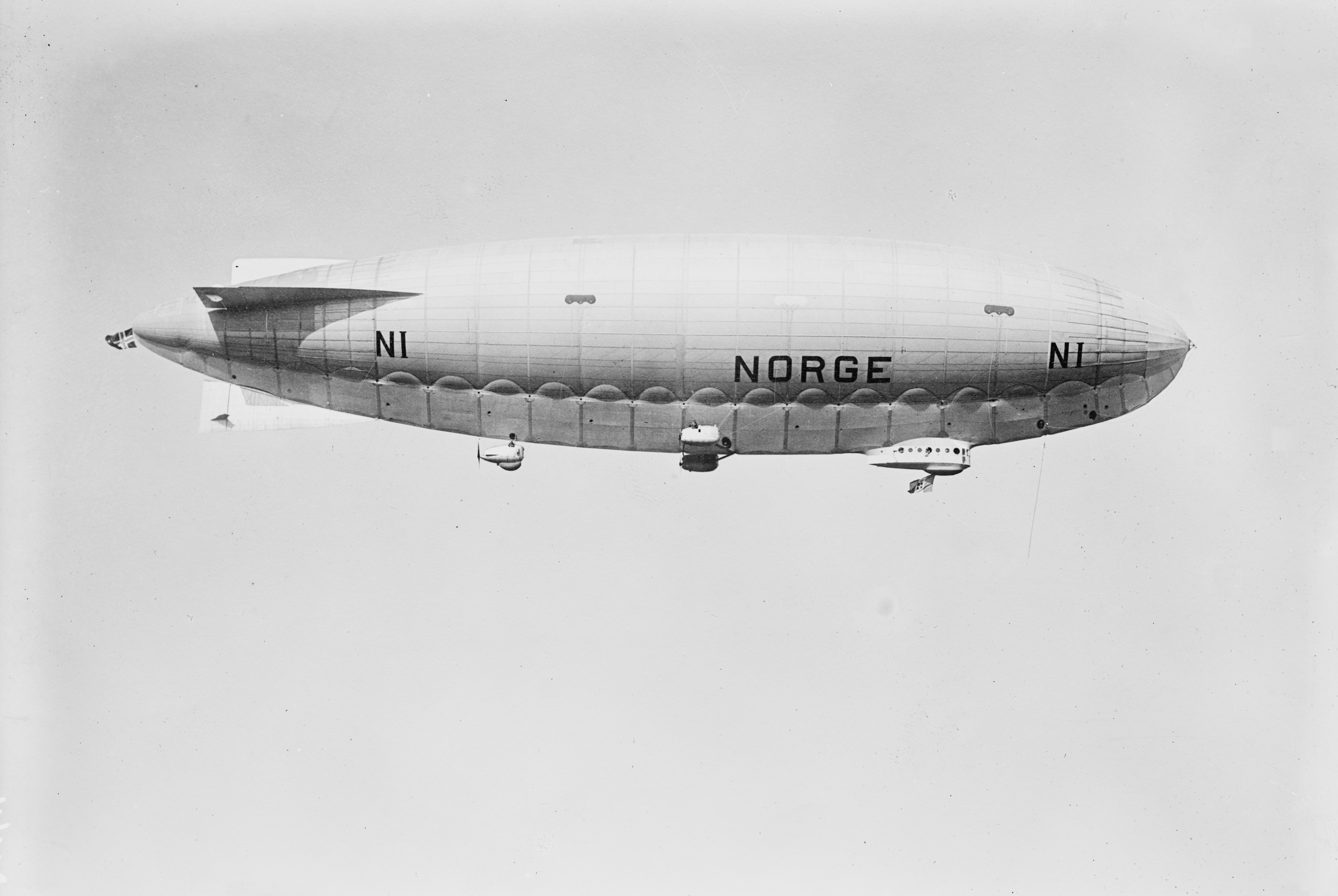

General information
- Other name: N-1, I-SAAN (Italian registration number)
- Type: N-class semi-rigid airship
- Owners: Umberto Nobile et al

History
- Manufactured: 1923
- First flight: March 1924 as N-1; April 1926 as Norge
- Fate: Dismantled at Teller, Alaska, for transport to Europe. Never flown again.

Norge was an Italian-built, semi-rigid airship that carried out the first verified trip of any kind to the North Pole, an overflight on 11-14 May 1926; Norge was also the first aircraft to fly over the polar ice cap between Europe and America. The expedition was conceived by polar explorer and expedition leader Roald Amundsen, the airship's designer and pilot Umberto Nobile, and the wealthy American adventurer and explorer Lincoln Ellsworth who, along with the Norsk Luftseiladsforening (Norwegian Airways Association), financed the trip which was known as the Amundsen–Ellsworth 1926 Transpolar Flight.

== Design and development ==
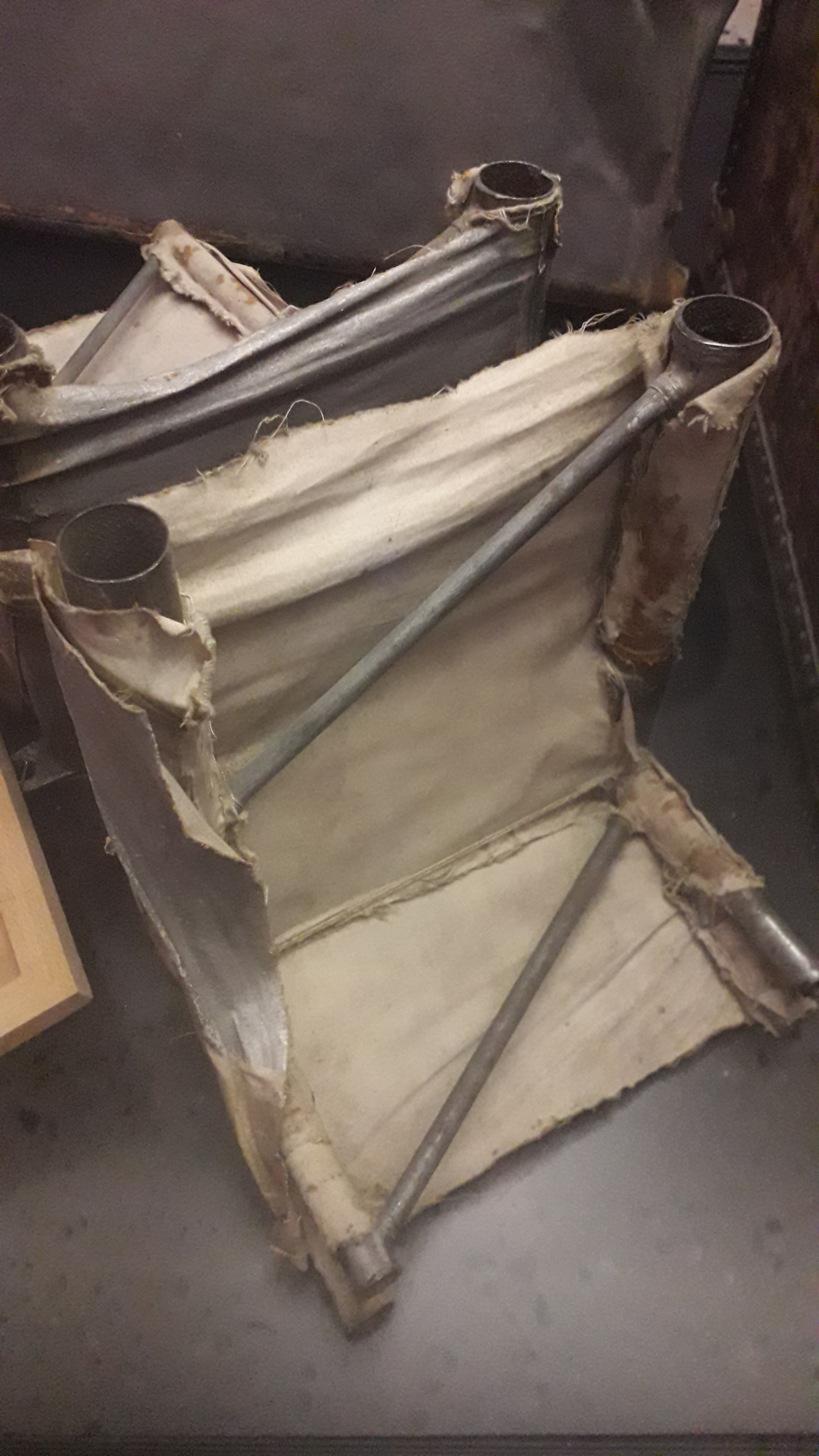
Fragments from Norge's tail

Norge was the first N-class semi-rigid airship designed by Italian aeronautical engineer Umberto Nobile and its construction began in 1923. As part of the sales contract to the Aviation Society, the airship was refitted for Arctic conditions. The pressurised envelope was reinforced with metal frames at the nose and tail, with a flexible tubular metal keel connecting the two. This was covered with fabric and used as storage and crew space. Three engine gondolas and the separate control cabin were attached to the bottom of the keel. Norge was the first Italian semi-rigid to be fitted with the cruciform tail fins first developed by the Schütte-Lanz company.

On 15 April 1924, N-1 was carried away from its base at Ciampino aerodrome by a violent wind gust. Two soldiers and a mechanic, who were unable to let go from the mooring lines, were carried 90 metres (300 ft) and dashed to death.

== Polar expedition ==
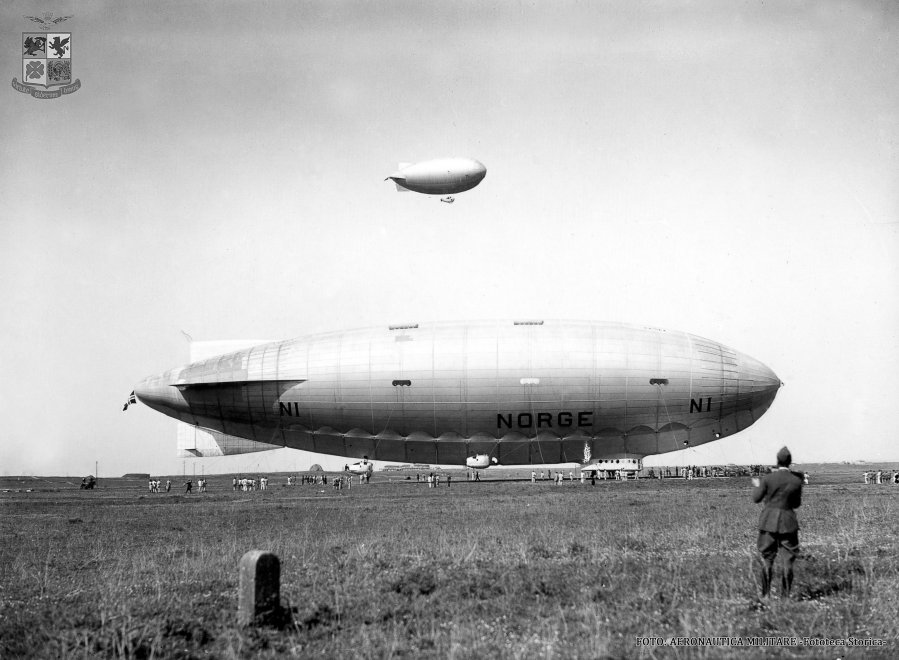
Norge prior to departure at Ciampino Airport

In 1925, Amundsen and Nobile met in Oslo, where the explorer proposed an airship expedition across the Arctic. With a contract in place, Nobile modified the already completed N-1 for flight in arctic weather. As the expedition was being financed by the Norwegian Aviation Society, the refitted N-1 was christened Norge (English: Norway).

On 29 March 1926, at a ceremony at the aerodrome in Ciampino, Norge was handed over to the Norwegian Aviation Society. The flight north was to leave Rome on 6 April but was delayed due to strong winds and departed at 09:25 on 10 April. Norge arrived at RNAS Pulham Airship Station in England at 15:20 but due to bad weather, the ship was not moored inside the hangar until 18:30. Delayed again by weather, Norge left Pulham for Oslo at 11:45 on 12 April.

At 01:00 on 15 April 1926, Norge left Ekeberg in Oslo for Gatchina near Leningrad. Slowed by dense fog along the way, the airship arrived at 19:30 after a flight of 17 hours. After the arrival at Gatchina, Nobile announced that Norge would remain in the hangar for a week for engine overhaul and maintenance; this included the addition of collapsible rubber boats for emergency use. Although scheduled to leave Gatchina as soon as the weather allowed after 24 April, the airship's departure was delayed another week as the mooring mast at King's Bay, Spitsbergen, had not yet been completed due to adverse weather. Although Nobile was anxious to leave for Spitsbergen even if the mast and shed were not completed as he was concerned about the weather, the departure from Gatchina was postponed once again.

Norge finally left Gatchina at 09:40 on the morning of 5 May to proceed to Vadsø in northern Norway, where the airship mooring mast still stands today. The expedition then crossed the Barents Sea to reach King's Bay at Ny-Ålesund, Svalbard. There Nobile met Richard Evelyn Byrd preparing his Fokker Trimotor for his North Pole attempt. Nobile explained the Norge trip was to observe the uncharted sea between the Pole and Alaska where some believed land to be; at the time, Nobile believed Robert Edwin Peary had already reached the pole. King's Bay would be the dirigible's last stop before crossing the pole. Norge then departed for the final stretch across the polar ice on the morning of 11 May, at 09:55.

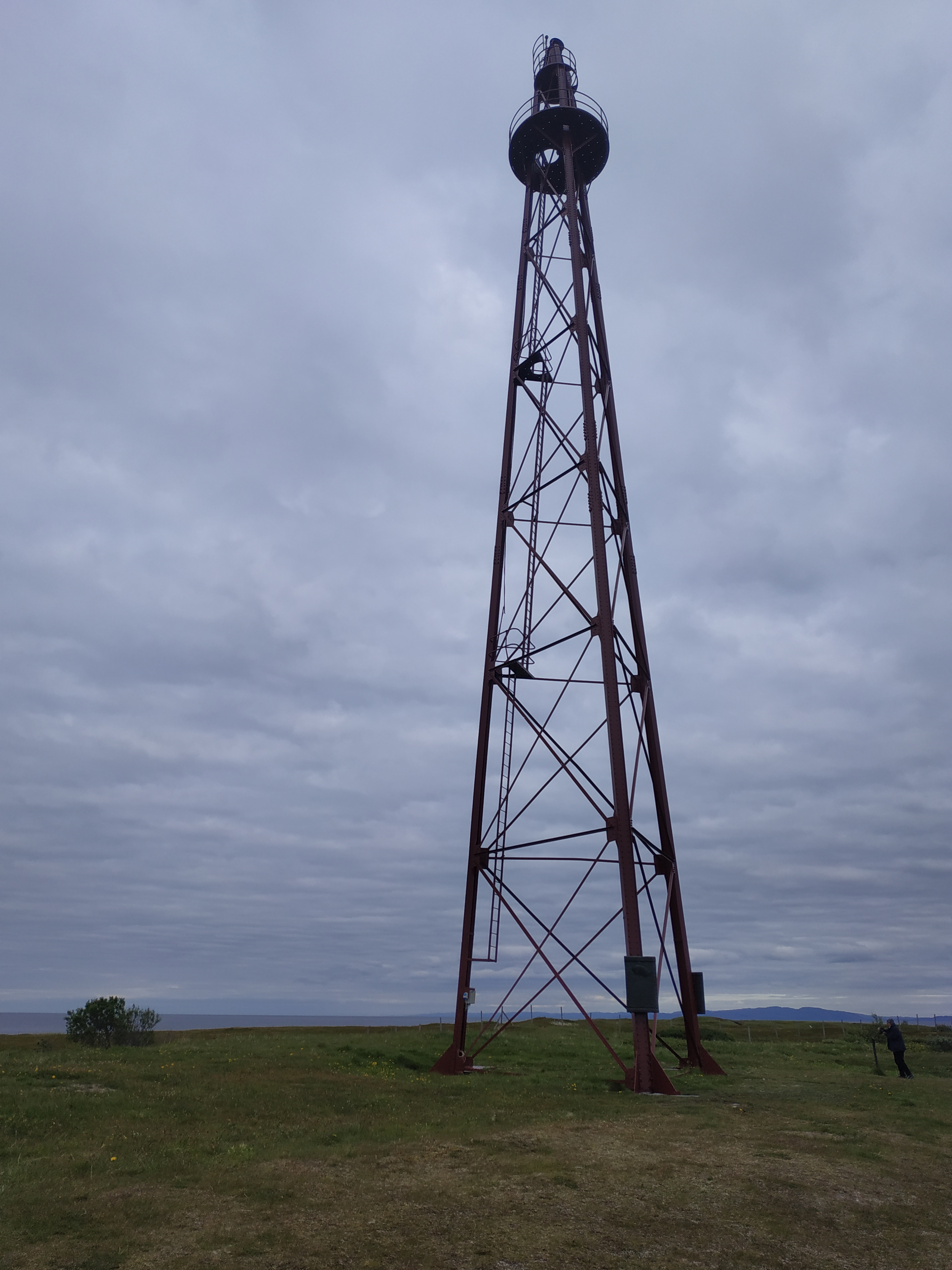
Mast in Vadsø

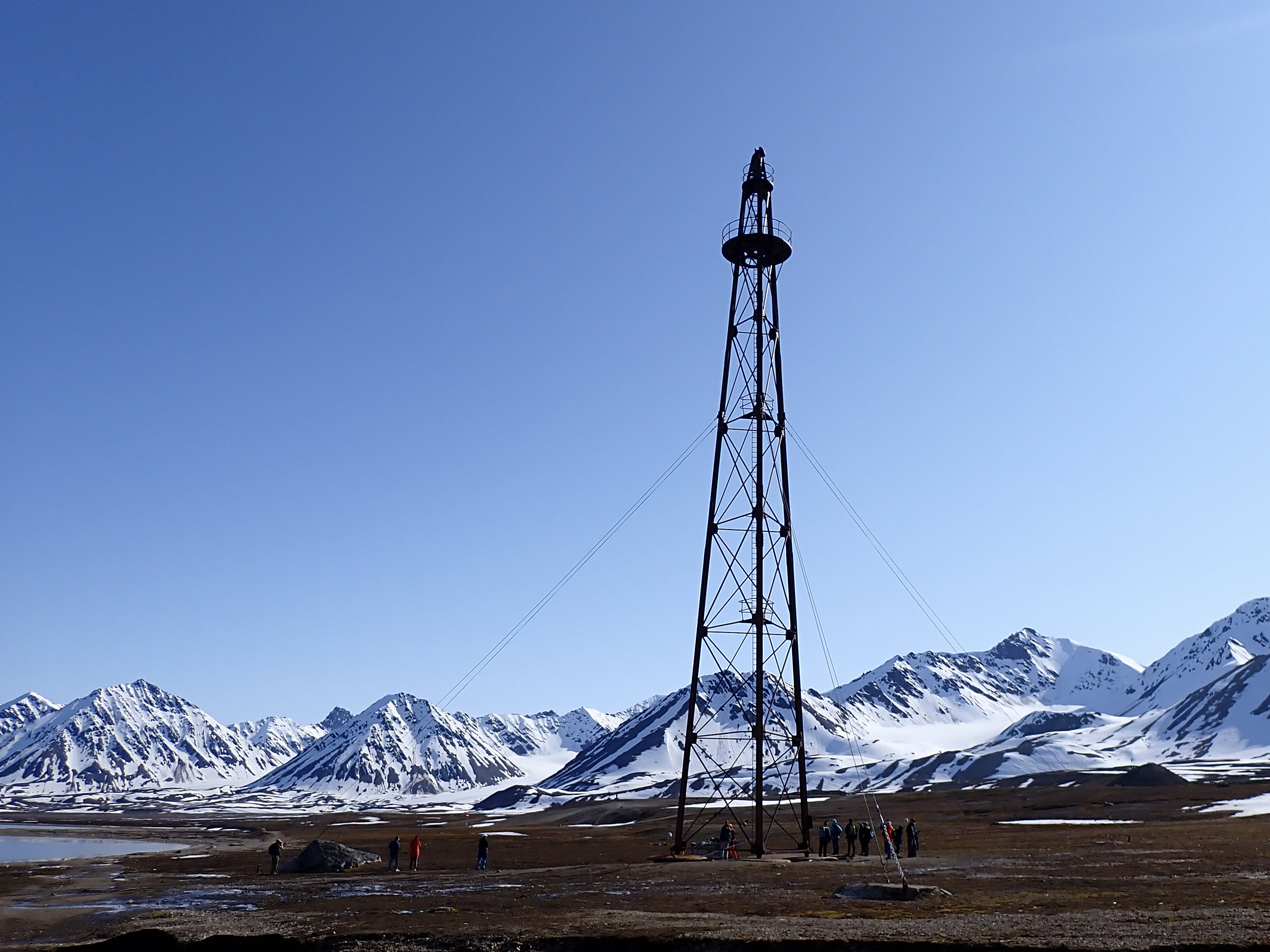
Mast in Ny-Ålesund

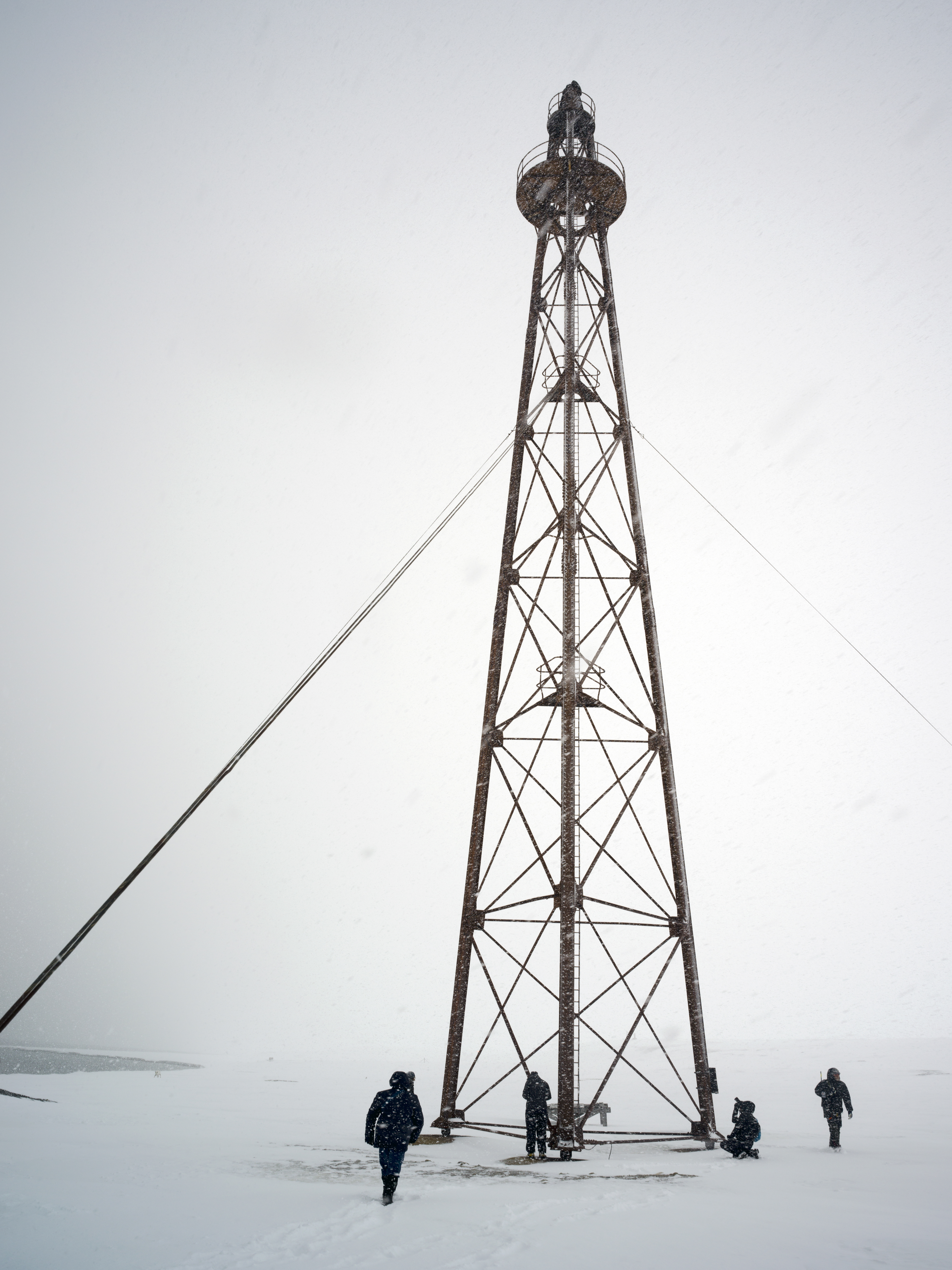
Norge Mast in Ny-Ålesund

The 16-man expedition included Amundsen, the expedition leader and navigator; Nobile, the dirigible's designer and pilot; Lincoln Ellsworth, wealthy American outdoorsman and expedition sponsor, and polar explorer Oscar Wisting who served as helmsman. Other crew members were 1st Lt. Hjalmar Riiser-Larsen, navigator; 1st Lt. Emil Horgen, assistant navigator; Capt. Birger Gottwaldt, radio expert, Dr. Finn Malmgren of Uppsala University, meteorologist; Fredrik Ramm, journalist; Frithjof Storm-Johnsen, radioman; Flying Lt. Oscar Omdal, flight engineer; Natale Cecioni, chief mechanic; Renato Alessandrini, rigger; Ettore Arduino, Attilio Caratti and Vincenzo Pomella, mechanics. Nobile's little dog, Titina, who accompanied him everywhere, was also aboard as mascot.

On 12 May at 01:25 (GMT), Norge reached the North Pole, at which point the Norwegian, American, and Italian flags were dropped from the airship onto the ice. Relations between Amundsen and Nobile, which had been lukewarm at best, were aggravated by the uncomfortable conditions in Norge's unheated, noisy control car and deteriorated further when Amundsen saw that the Italian flag dropped by Nobile was larger than either of the others. Amundsen later recalled with scorn that after he and Ellsworth had dropped the flags of Norway and the United States onto the ice, Nobile began tossing overboard armfuls of different flags and banners and Norge had become "a circus wagon of the skies", an occurrence Nobile later claimed Amundsen had greatly exaggerated.

After crossing the pole, the airship's propellers became encrusted with ice to such an extent that pieces of ice breaking off were flung against the outer cover of the ship, causing several rips and tears in the fabric.

The ice forming on the propellers as we went through the fog, and hurled against the underside of the bag, had pretty well scarred up the fabric covering the keel, though it had not opened up the gas bags or caused any hydrogen loss. We had used up all our cement in repairing the fabric...

On 14 May, Norge reached the Inupiat village of Teller, Alaska, where in view of worsening weather, the decision was made to land there rather than continue on to Nome, about 110 kilometres (70 mi) away. Norge sustained some damage during the landing; the airship was dismantled, packed in crates and shipped back to Italy for repair and refitting which was never undertaken.

The three previous expeditions that claim to have reached the North Pole—led by Frederick Cook in 1908, Robert Peary in 1909, and Richard E. Byrd in 1926 (just a few days before Norge)—are all disputed as being either highly inaccurate or totally false. Some of those disputing these earlier claims therefore consider the crew of Norge to be the first verified explorers to have reached the North Pole.

== Specifications ==
Norge specifications are as follows.

General characteristics

- Capacity: Payload 9,500 kg (20,900 lb)
- Length: 106 m (347 ft 9 in)
- Diameter: 26 m (85 ft 4 in)
- Volume: 19,000 m^{3} (670,000 cu ft) of gaseous Hydrogen
- Powerplant: 3 × Maybach Mb.IV 6-cylinder water-cooled in-line piston engine, 190 kW (260 hp) each

Performance

- Maximum speed: 115 km/h (71 mph, 62 kn)

== See also ==
- Italia (airship)
- Norge Storage Site
- Spitsbergen Airship Museum
