= St. Michael, Alaska =

St. Michael Taciq (Central Yupik) Tasiq (Inupiaq) Сент-Майкл (Russian)
- City
- Location in Alaska
- Coordinates: 63°28′16″N 162°3′11″W
- Country: United States
- State: Alaska
- Census Area: Nome
- Incorporated: July 15, 1969

Government
  - Mayor: Alice Fitka
  - State senator: Donald Olson (D)
  - State rep.: Neal Foster (D)

Area
  - Total: 28.07 sq mi (72.69 km^{2})
  - Land: 21.75 sq mi (56.33 km^{2})
  - Water: 6.32 sq mi (16.36 km^{2})
- Elevation: 26 ft (8 m)

Population (2020)
  - Total: 456
  - Density: 21/sq mi (8.1/km^{2})
- Time zone: UTC-9 (Alaska (AKST))
  - Summer (DST): UTC-8 (AKDT)
- ZIP code: 99659
- Area code: 907
- FIPS code: 02-66360
- GNIS feature ID: 1408977

St. Michael (Central Yupik: Taciq, Inupiaq: Tasiq; Taziq, Russian: Сент-Майкл), historically referred to as Saint Michael, is a city in Nome Census Area, Alaska. As of the 2020 census, St. Michael had a population of 456.

== Geography ==
St. Michael is located at 63°28′43″N 162°02′14″W on the east side of St. Michael Island at the southeastern end of the Norton Sound.

According to the United States Census Bureau, the city has a total area of 28.1 square miles (73 km^{2}), of which, 21.8 square miles (56 km^{2}) of it is land and 6.3 square miles (16 km^{2}) of it (22.40%) is water.

== Demographics ==
Historical population
Census	Pop.	Note	%±
1880	109		—
1890	101		−7.3%
1900	857		748.5%
1910	415		−51.6%
1920	371		−10.6%
1930	147		−60.4%
1940	142		−3.4%
1950	157		10.6%
1960	205		30.6%
1970	207		1.0%
1980	239		15.5%
1990	295		23.4%
2000	368		24.7%
2010	401		9.0%
2020	456		13.7%
U.S. Decennial Census

Saint Michael first appeared on the 1880 U.S. Census as the unincorporated Inuit villages of "Saint Michael and Tachik." Of the 109 residents, 100 were Inuit, 5 were Creole (Mixed Russian and Native) and 4 were White. It returned in 1890 as Saint Michael (though it also included the native village of Tachik and a camp of miners). Of the 101 residents, 38 were natives, 33 were Creole and 30 were White. Saint Michael has continued to report in every successive census to date. It formally incorporated in 1969.

=== 2020 census ===
As of the 2020 census, St. Michael had a population of 456. The median age was 22.4 years. 42.5% of residents were under the age of 18 and 5.7% of residents were 65 years of age or older. For every 100 females there were 117.1 males, and for every 100 females age 18 and over there were 109.6 males age 18 and over.

0.0% of residents lived in urban areas, while 100.0% lived in rural areas.

There were 95 households in St. Michael, of which 63.2% had children under the age of 18 living in them. Of all households, 30.5% were married-couple households, 24.2% were households with a male householder and no spouse or partner present, and 33.7% were households with a female householder and no spouse or partner present. About 13.7% of all households were made up of individuals and 3.2% had someone living alone who was 65 years of age or older.

There were 114 housing units, of which 16.7% were vacant. The homeowner vacancy rate was 1.6% and the rental vacancy rate was 19.0%.

Racial composition as of the 2020 census
Race	Number	Percent
White	25	5.5%
Black or African American	3	0.7%
American Indian and Alaska Native	413	90.6%
Asian	0	0.0%
Native Hawaiian and Other Pacific Islander	0	0.0%
Some other race	0	0.0%
Two or more races	15	3.3%
Hispanic or Latino (of any race)	3	0.7%

=== 2000 census ===
As of the 2000 census, there were 368 people, 90 households, and 65 families residing in the city. The population density was 16.9 inhabitants per square mile (6.5/km^{2}). There were 93 housing units at an average density of 4.3 per square mile (1.7/km^{2}). The racial makeup of the city was 6.79% White, 92.66% Native American, and 0.54% from two or more races. 0.27% of the population were Hispanic or Latino of any race.

Of the 90 households, 54.4% had children under the age of 18 living with them, 46.7% were married couples living together, 16.7% had a female householder with no husband present, and 26.7% were non-families. 18.9% of all households were made up of individuals, and 4.4% had someone living alone who was 65 years of age or older. The average household size was 4.09 and the average family size was 4.79.

In the city, the population was spread out, with 43.8% under the age of 18, 11.1% from 18 to 24, 28.0% from 25 to 44, 14.1% from 45 to 64, and 3.0% who were 65 years of age or older. The median age was 22 years. For every 100 females, there were 114.0 males. For every 100 females age 18 and over, there were 120.2 males.

The median income for a household in the city was $33,036, and the median income for a family was $34,000. Males had a median income of $31,250 versus $16,250 for females. The per capita income for the city was $10,692. About 24.2% of families and 22.9% of the population were below the poverty line, including 23.1% of those under age 18 and 41.7% of those age 65 or over.

== Education ==
St. Michael is served by the Bering Strait School District. Anthony A. Andrews School serves grades Pre-K through 12 grades.

== History ==
Redoubt St. Michael was founded in 1833 by traders of the Russian-American Company, as a trading post for trade with the Yup'ik people of the area. The trading settlement and the island were named after the archangel Michael.

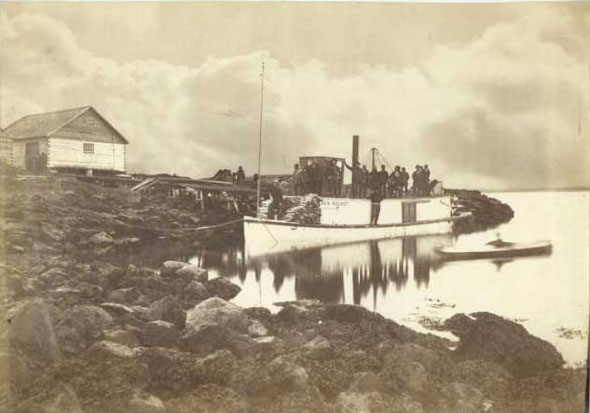
The steamer New Racket hired by Al and Ed Schieffelin at the wharf of St. Michael, Alaska, in 1888 before its departure for the Yukon River.

Fort St. Michael, a U.S. military post, was established in 1897. During the gold rush of 1897, it was a major gateway to the Alaskan interior via the Yukon River Delta (located about 40 miles (64 km) to the southwest). As many as 10,000 persons were said to live in St. Michael during the gold rush. St. Michael was also a popular trading post for Alaska Natives to trade their goods for Western supplies. Centralization of many Yup'iks from the surrounding villages intensified after the measles epidemic of 1900 and the influenza epidemic of 1918.

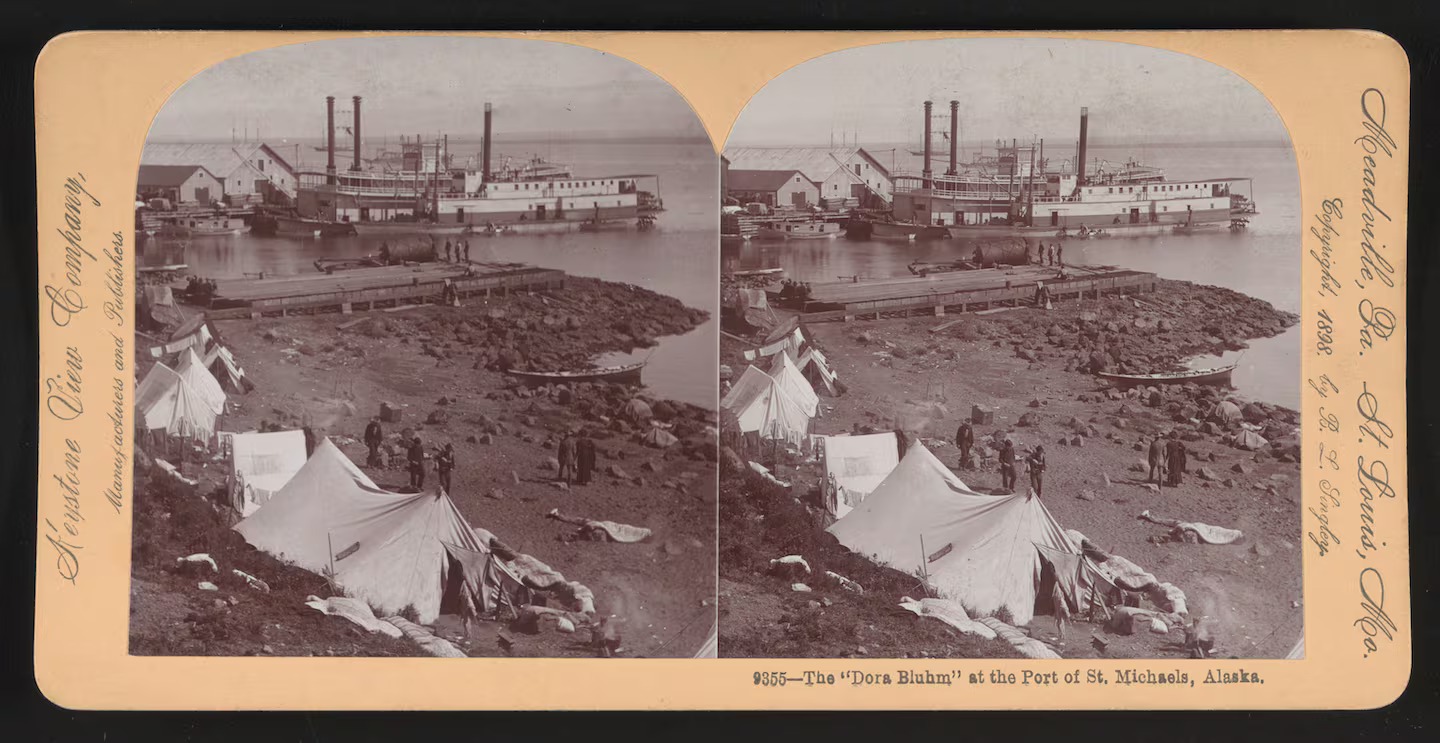
Stereograph of the "Dora Bluhm" at the Port of St. Michaels, Alaska

St. Michael's population today is largely Yup'ik. Many residents are also descendants of the Russian traders.

== Economy ==
The St. Michael economy is based on subsistence food harvests (hunting, fishing and gardening) supplemented by part-time wage earning. Most wage-earning positions are in city government, the IRA council and village corporation, schools and local stores. Some residents hold commercial fishing permits, primarily for the herring fishery.
