= Norton Sound =

Inlet of the Bering Sea in Alaska, United States

Coordinates: 63.9°N 163.3°W

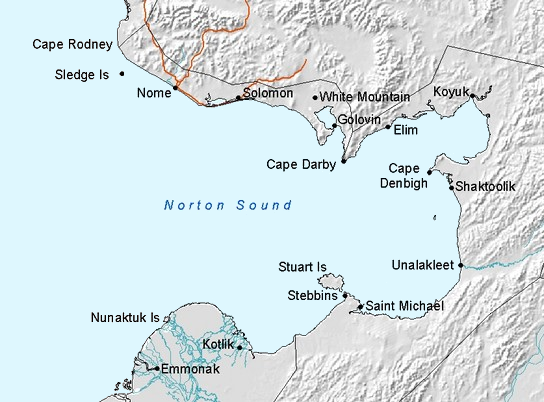
Norton Sound

The Norton Sound (Inupiaq: Imaqpak) is an inlet of the Bering Sea on the western coast of the U.S. state of Alaska, south of the Seward Peninsula. It is about 240 km (150 mi) long and 200 km (125 mi) wide. The Yukon River delta forms a portion of the south shore and water from the Yukon influences this body of water. It is ice-free from June to October.

Norton Sound was explored by Captain James Cook in September 1778. He named the body of water after Sir Fletcher Norton, then Speaker of the British House of Commons.

The Norton Sound area has been home to Yup'ik and Iñupiat for many centuries. It is the boundary between the two peoples; the Inupiat live to the north and the Yup'ik to the south. The town of Nome is along the northern edge of Norton Sound. The villages of Elim, Golovin, Stebbins, White Mountain, Koyuk, Shaktoolik, St. Michael, and Unalakleet are on the shores or waterways flowing into Norton Sound. The Iditarod Trail Sled Dog Race runs through coastal villages between Unalakleet and Nome.

The seaplane tender USS Norton Sound was named after the inlet. The Eliot Staples Bering Sea Ice Golf Classic occurs at the sound in mid-March. Nome National Forest is located just off the coast of Nome.

On February 6, 2025, Bering Air Flight 445 crashed while flying over Norton Sound.

== Bibliography ==
- U.S. Geological Survey Geographic Names Information System: Norton Sound
