= Ann Reid =

Nonprofit Executive Director

Ann H. Reid
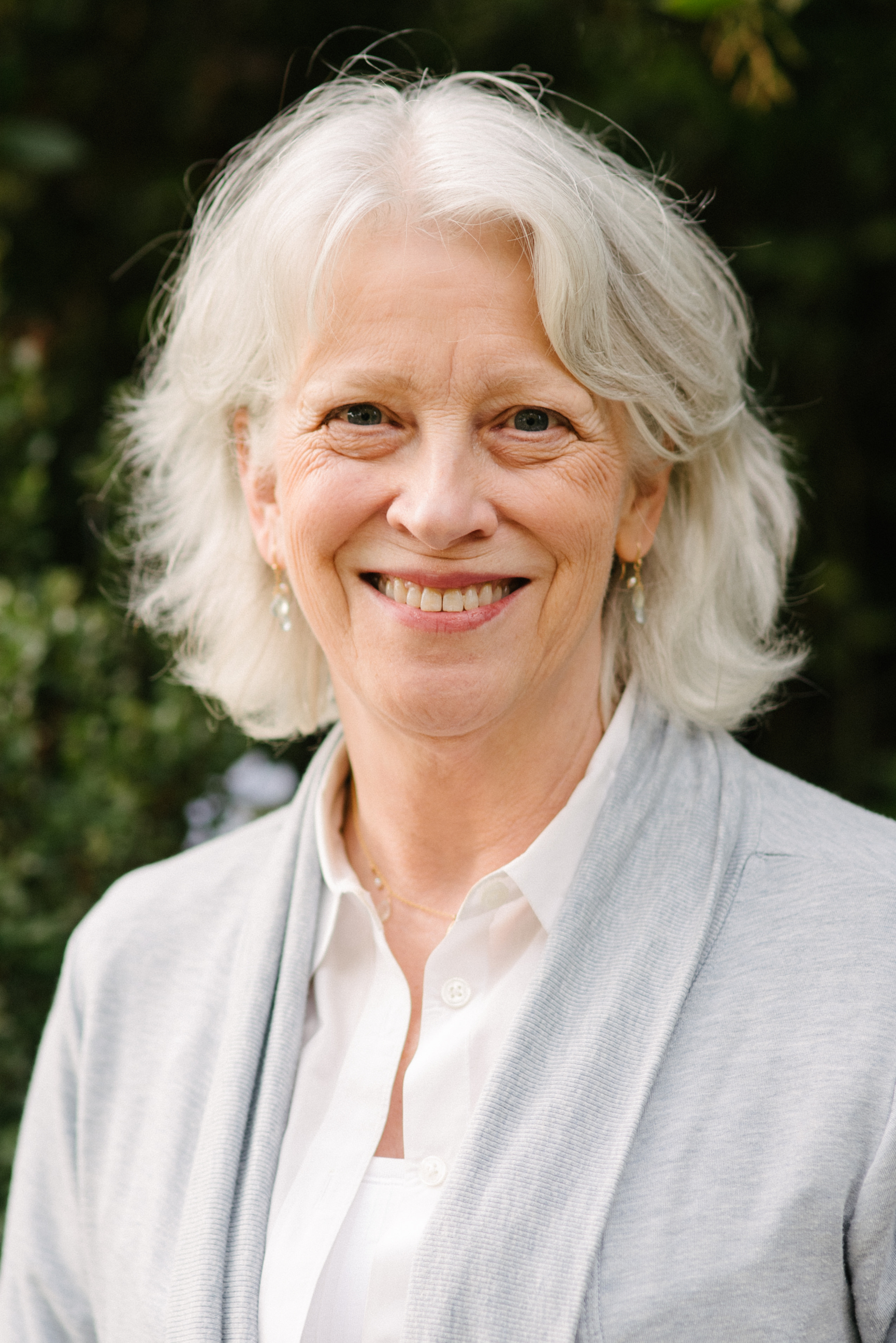
- Ann Reid, NCSE executive director
- Citizenship: United States
- Occupation: Pathologist
- Known for: Genetic sequencing of the 1918 influenza virus

Ann Reid is an American scientist. She served as the Executive Director of the National Center for Science Education from 2014 to 2023.

== Education ==
Reid graduated from Bard College at Simon's Rock in environmental science, obtained a master's degree in international studies at Johns Hopkins University.

== Career ==
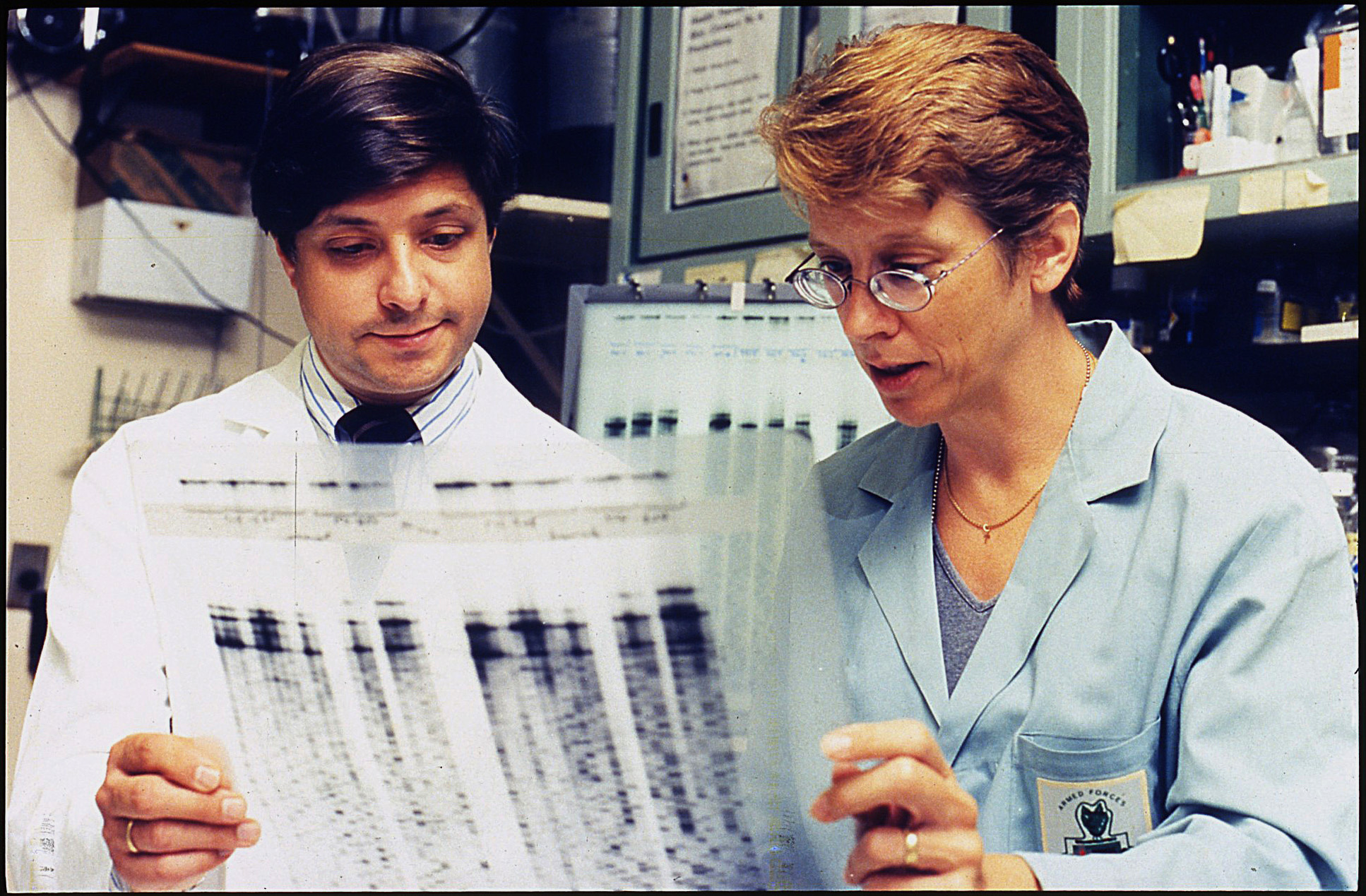
With Jeffery Tautenberger in the 1990s, while working to sequence the virus that caused the 1918 influenza epidemic.

At age 21 Reid worked at the Organisation for Economic Co-operation and Development (OECD) in Paris for three years. Disappointed with diplomatic work, she went back to the United States to develop a career in medical research, starting as a technician at the Walter Reed Army Medical Center, then as a molecular biologist at the Armed Forces Institute of Pathology, where she started to write about science education. While at the AFIP, she did a large part of the laboratory work leading to the sequencing of the 1918 influenza virus.

From 2010 to 2013, she was the director of the American Academy of Microbiology. She was appointed as executive director of the National Center for Science Education in 2014.

In her role as a spokesperson for the NCSE, Reid is frequently called upon by the media to comment on news stories related to science education and the place of science in public policy. She has been interviewed by The New York Times, The Washington Post, NPR, CBS, and other national news outlets.

== Selected publications ==
- Branch, Glenn; Reid, Ann; Plutzer, Eric (December 2021). "Teaching evolution in U.S. public middle schools: results of the first national survey". Evolution: Education and Outreach. 14 (8) 8. Springer. doi:10.1186/s12052-021-00145-z. S2CID 235260231 – via ResearchGate.
- Plutzer, Eric; Branch, Glenn; Reid, Ann (June 2020). "Teaching evolution in U.S. public schools: a continuing challenge". Evolution: Education and Outreach. 13 (14) 14. Springer. doi:10.1186/s12052-020-00126-8. S2CID 219552858 – via ResearchGate.
- Keep, Stephanie; Reid, Ann; Branch, Glenn (December 2015). "Wading into the undeniable". Evolution: Education and Outreach. 8 (7) 7. doi:10.1186/s12052-015-0035-6. S2CID 23405087 – via ResearchGate.
- Taubenberger, Jeffery; Reid, Ann; Lourens, Raina (6 October 2005). "Characterization of the 1918 influenza virus polymerase genes". Nature. 437 (7060): 889–893. Bibcode:2005Natur.437..889T. doi:10.1038/nature04230. PMID 16208372. S2CID 4405787.

== See also ==
- Johan Hultin
- Jeffery Taubenberger
