= President's Medal =

The President's Medal may refer to:

- President's Medal (British Academy)
- President's Medal (Israel), highest civil medal given by the State of Israel
- President's Medal (Royal Academy of Engineering)
- President's Medal for Shooting, awarded to champion shots by the Republic of Ciskei

== See also ==
- President's Inauguration Medal, Sri Lanka commemoration medal
- President's Police Medal, Indian law enforcement decoration
- President's Silver Medal for Best Feature Film, see National Film Award for Best Feature Film in Kannada
