= Jeffery Taubenberger =

American virologist

Jeffery K. Taubenberger
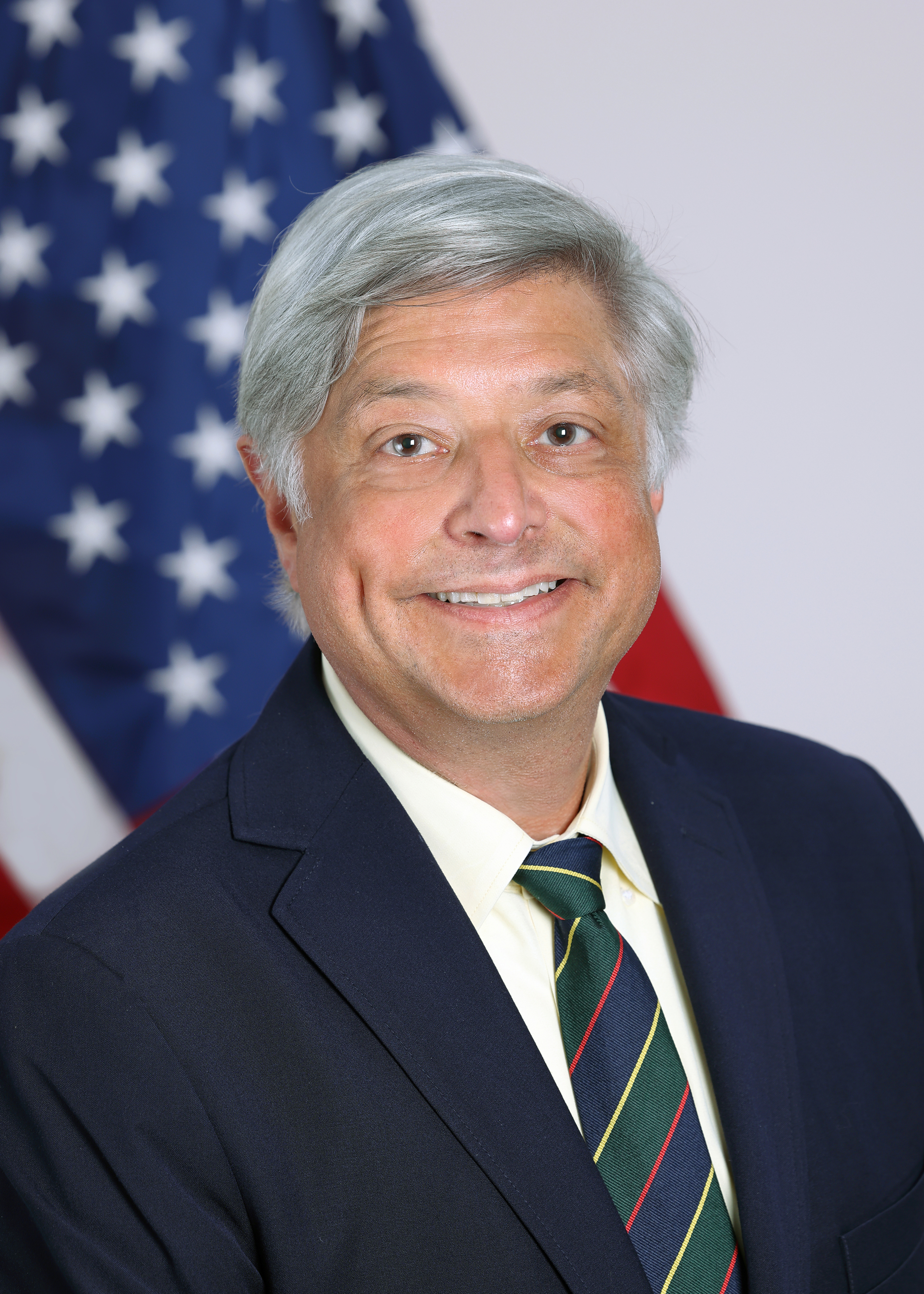
- Official portrait, 2025

Acting Director of the National Institute of Allergy and Infectious Diseases
- In office April 24, 2025 – May 2026
- Preceded by: Jeanne Marrazzo
- Succeeded by: John Powers III

Personal details
- Born: 1961 (age 64–65) Landstuhl, Germany
- Citizenship: American
- Education: VCU Medical Center (MD, PhD
- Occupation: Virologist
- Known for: The first to sequence the genome of the influenza virus which caused the 1918 pandemic of Spanish flu.

Jeffery Karl Taubenberger (born 1961) is an American virologist. With Ann Reid and Johan Hultin, he was the first to sequence the genome of the influenza virus which caused the 1918 pandemic of Spanish flu. He is Chief of the Viral Pathogenesis and Evolution Section, Laboratory of Infectious Diseases, National Institute of Allergy and Infectious Diseases, National Institutes of Health. Taubenberger's laboratory studies viruses, including influenza A viruses (IAVs), which are the pathogens that cause yearly flu epidemics and have caused periodic pandemics, such as the 1968 outbreak that killed an estimated one million people. His research aims to inform public health strategies on influenza: seasonal flu; avian flu, swine flu, and pandemic flu, which can arise from numerous sources and spread quickly because humans have little to no immunity to it. He served as acting director of the National Institute of Allergy and Infectious Diseases from April 2025 to May 2026.

== Early life ==
Taubenberger was born in Germany, the third son of a U.S. Army officer. At age six he moved to a suburb of Washington, D.C. with his parents after his father was posted to the Pentagon. He completed a combined M.D. (1986) and Ph.D. (1987) at the Medical College of Virginia in Richmond in a course designed for students who wanted to follow a career in medical research. His thesis focused on how stem cells of the bone marrow differentiate into the mature cells of the white blood cell system.

== Career ==
In 1988 he began training to become a pathologist at the National Cancer Institute of the National Institutes of Health. In 1993 he was recruited to start a new lab at the Armed Forces Institute of Pathology (AFIP) in order to apply molecular techniques to the Institute's pathology work. After a year he was promoted to chief of the Division of Molecular Pathology. This included a research lab, where he was free to pursue questions of basic science.

The AFIP was one of more than a dozen tenants located by the Walter Reed Army Medical Center in northeast Washington, so its director reported to the Surgeon General of the Army. It had been established by a Civil War general as the Army Medical Museum in 1862 to combat “diseases of the battlefield”. Before AFIP closed in 2011 as a result of the 2005 Base Realignment and Closure Act, the pathology division spent most of its time as a consultant, giving free second opinions to the military and for a fee to civilian physicians. It handled tens of thousands of cases yearly on the understanding that it could keep a representative sample from any case. In this way it collected tissue samples of some 2,600,000 people from surgical and autopsy material, mostly in the form of dice-sized pieces of tissue fixed in formalin and embedded in wax blocks of paraffin.

In the winter of 1987 half the population of bottlenosed dolphins along the Atlantic seaboard of the United States died of a mysterious disease. A veterinary pathologist at AFIP suspected a viral infection. In 1991 Albert Osterhaus isolated a morbillivirus from dolphins who fell victim to a similar disease in the Mediterranean, but the samples from the first die-off were too degraded to isolate any viruses. Taubenberger was part of a group of researchers who characterized the morbillivruses by modifying the new technique of PCR.

=== Spanish flu ===
Fearing government cutbacks Taubenberger looked for an application of PCR to the immense warehouse of tissue samples at the AFIP. He eventually settled on finding remains of the flu virus, which caused the 1918 "Spanish flu". The warehouse stored wax blocks from seventy-seven soldiers who had died in the pandemic. Taubenberger's team searched for samples of victims who had succumbed to the initial viral infection and not the subsequent bacterial pneumonia. From serum tests it was known that the virus belonged to the H1N1 subtype. The team looked at all available sequences of influenza genes of this subtype to find out whether any parts of a given gene that were virtually identical. These were turned into primers.

The first aim was to clarify whether any fragments of the flu virus were left in the tissue samples. The laboratory work was mostly done by Ann Reid and for more than a year she found nothing. On July 23, 1996 Amy Krafft, whom she had turned to for help, got a positive result on a case from the 1957 influenza pandemic. That success led Reid to test more cases from 1918, with an eventual positive signal from tissue belonging to army private Roscoe Vaughan, who had died on 26 September 1918 at Camp Jackson, South Carolina from a pneumonia of the left lung. His right lung seems to have lagged a few days behind in the progression of the disease, so that the virus was still present there when he died.

The sequence of a matrix gene did not match any known sequence exactly, so that a contaminant could be ruled out. In all, Taubenberger's team isolated nine fragments of viral RNA from five different genes. They decided to send their first publication to Nature, but the editors rejected the paper without even mailing it to experts for peer review. Science was skeptical too at first, but eventually published what amounted to about 15 percent of the haemagglutinin gene as well as small fragments of the four other genes on 21 March 1997. By the summer of 1997 the team had the full sequence of the haemagglutinin. At this point the problem arose that they had used up half of Vaughan's available tissue for this one gene. It seemed most probable that all ten genes of the 1918 virus could not be sequenced from the available material. (In September 1997 tissue from private James Downs, who succumbed to influenza at Camp Upton, New York, turned out positive as well.)

The March paper in Science was read by Johan Hultin. In 1951 the pathologist had already tried to isolate the 1918 influenza virus from victims buried in the Alaskan permafrost. At what was called Teller Mission, he had unearthed bodies but had failed to find live viruses. In July 1997 he offered Taubenberger to return to what had become Brevig, Alaska. Again he received permission to dig for victims of the 1918 flu, and he unearthed the remains of an obese woman, maybe thirty years old, whom he christened “Lucy”. The fat had protected her lungs from decay, and he took both of them, providing enough material to sequence the complete 1918 virus many times over. Taubenberger and Reid managed to generate a complete haemagglutinin sequence to confirm the one from Vaughan. In all three cases – Vaughan, Downs, and Lucy – the 1,800 base pairs differed only in a few places. This was the best confirmation that the sequence of the 1918 haemagglutinin had actually been found.

In a series of papers the team published the complete genome of the 1918 virus. The work was funded by the Veteran's Administration and the Department of Defense. The completion of the genome in 2005 was numbered among the “breakthroughs of the year” by Science and was elected as "paper of the year" by Lancet.

=== NIH ===
Taubenberger moved to the NIH in 2006 where he continues to do research on influenza and other viruses. On April 24, 2025, he was named the acting director of the National Institute of Allergy and Infectious Diseases (NIAID), at the National Institutes of Health. On June 28, 2022, he was awarded a patent for a " Broadly Protective Inactivated Influenza Virus Vaccine", which became the basis for NIAID's Generation Gold Standard initiative, which seeks to develop a strain-independent set of vaccines for respiratory illnesses such as influenza and coronavirus using a Β-Propiolactone-inactivated whole virus platform.

== Personal life ==
In his free time Taubenberger pursues music. He is a woodwind player – oboe, English horn, clarinet. His interest is mainly composition. In 1981 he created his first opus, the operetta The Wayward Prince, lyrics with Andrew Russo. The overture was performed by the George Mason University Orchestra in July 1982 with Taubenberger as conductor. In 1984 he wrote a "Symphony in D minor", from which he performed two movements with the Richmond Community Orchestra with Taubenberger conducting. Further work includes two lieder on poems by Goethe (1985–1986), two woodwind quintets (1987& 1988), and a string quartet in G major (1990), which was performed by the Columbia String Ensemble and in 1995 by the Gallery Quartet. Next came eight two-part inventions for solo piano (1994), a string quartet in E minor (1997), and "Daydreams", a symphonic tone poem for large orchestra (2000).

Taubenberger is married and has two children. Taubenberger is a second cousin to former Philadelphia mayoral candidate Al Taubenberger.

In 1998, Taubenberger critiqued a draft of The Ninth Day of Creation from novelist Stephen Carter, who had discovered Taubenberger's work through the paper in Science. Taubenberger then agreed to be interviewed by Carter about his ongoing work with the sequencing of the 1918 strain. The interview was conducted and placed online in March 1998 as "An Interview With Dr. Jeffery Taubenberger".

== Sources ==
- Davies, Pete (1999). Catching cold: 1918's forgotten tragedy and the scientific hunt for the virus that caused it. London: Michael Joseph. ISBN 0-7181-4349-3.
- Illus with photos; Kolata, Gina Bari (2000). Flu: The Story of the Great Influenza Pandemic of 1918 and the Search for the Virus That Caused It. New York: Farrar Straus Giroux. ISBN 0-333-75105-1.
- Closing in on a Killer: Scientists Unlock Clues to the Spanish Influenza Virus (exhibit at National Museum of Health and Medicine, 1996)
