= Daved H. Fremont =

- Born: January 13, 1964
- Education: University of California, San Diego
- Scientific career
- Workplaces: Washington University in St. Louis
- Doctoral advisor: Ian Wilson

Daved H. Fremont (born January 13, 1964) is a professor at the Washington University School of Medicine with dual appointments in the Departments of Pathology and Immunology/Biochemistry and Molecular Biophysics. He is currently director of the Computational and Molecular Biophysics Program. Fremont is also a principal investigator in the Center for Structural Genomics of Infectious Disease and his laboratory has deposited structures of proteins from several major human pathogens to the protein data bank (PDB).

In 1993, Fremont received his Ph.D. in chemistry working in Ian Wilson's laboratory at The Scripps Research Institute while a student at the University of California, San Diego.

In 1998, he joined Washington University in St. Louis as an assistant professor where his research expanded to include viral immune evasion and antibody-mediated neutralization. His laboratory has since established the structural basis for interactions between host cytokines and poxviruses and herpesviruses decoy receptors and neutralization of West Nile virus by therapeutic antibodies. Fremont is now best known for his research on how the immune system recognizes viruses and the subversion mechanisms they deploy to avoid detection and clearance.

On the personal side, Fremont is married and has a daughter. He enjoys playing Go and poker; in the latter, he is partial to seven card stud, especially the Chesterfield version, and does not prefer wild card games.
