= Johan Hultin =

American pathologist (1924–2022)

- Born: October 7, 1924; Stockholm, Sweden
- Died: January 22, 2022 (aged 97); Walnut Creek, California, United States
- Citizenship: United States
- Education: University of Iowa
- Occupation: Pathologist
- Known for: recovering tissues containing traces of the 1918 influenza virus

Johan Hultin (October 7, 1924 – January 22, 2022) was a Swedish-born American pathologist known for recovering tissues containing traces of the 1918 influenza virus that killed millions worldwide.

== Life and career ==
Hultin was born into a wealthy family in Stockholm on October 7, 1924. His father, Viking Hultin, was a businessman, and his mother was Eivor Jeansson Hultin, who later remarried the pathologist Carl Næslund. Hultin grew up with two sisters, one of them succumbed to sepsis at the age of six and the other died in a traffic collision at 32. Hultin was initially pursuing a degree in medicine at Uppsala University, but decided to immigrate to the U.S. in 1949 with his first wife, Gunvor, and earned his Master's degree and an M.D. at the University of Iowa. During his time there, he researched and warned against bioterrorism. After a brief career as a scientist, he switched gears and became a pathologist, working at several hospitals in the San Francisco Bay Area. During his spare time, he developed ways to improve automotive safety which led to recognition by the U.S. Department of Transportation. He was an avid hiker and is the oldest person to ski Mustagh Ata in China. Hultin was also a builder. He constructed a log cabin in Bear Valley, California, that is a replica of Vastveitloftet, a 1355 A.D. loft house from Norway.

Hultin was awarded a Distinguished Alumni Award by the University of Iowa in 2000. In 2009, the University of Iowa awarded him an honorary Doctor of Science.

== 1918 influenza discovery ==
The Hultin couple had some experience with permafrost excavation after assisting at an Alaska dig site under the supervision of paleontologist Otto Geist in the summer of 1949. In 1951, Johan Hultin tried to isolate the 1918 influenza virus from victims who had been buried in the Alaskan permafrost of a town called Brevig Mission. During the pandemic, 72 of the town's 80 residents perished from the flu. In his search, he unearthed bodies but failed to find any live viruses.

Nearly 50 years later, in July 1997, Hultin read an article in the journal Science written by virologist Jeffery Taubenberger who published the initial genetic sequence of the 1918 flu virus. Hultin offered his services to recover lung tissues from victims of 1918 and returned to Brevig Mission. Again he received permission to dig for victims of the 1918 flu pandemic, and this time he unearthed the remains of an obese woman, roughly thirty years old, whom he christened "Lucy". The fat had protected her lungs from decay, and he took both of them. It turned out that in Lucy's case there was enough material to sequence the complete 1918 virus many times over. The first sequence from the sample was published in the journal Proceedings of the National Academy of Sciences with Hultin as a co-author. This sample provided scientists a first-hand opportunity to study the virus, which was inactivated with guanidinium thiocyanate before transport. This sample and others found in U.S. Armed Forces Institute of Pathology (AFIP) archives allowed researchers to completely analyze the critical gene structures of the 1918 virus. Using the recovered traces, scientists revealed that the virus originated from birds and mutated to infect humans.

== Personal life and death ==
With his first wife, Gunvor (1924–2011), Hultin had four children; he and Gunvor later divorced, and, in 1985, he married English-born Eileen. In 2020, they were living in Rossmoor, California.

He died at his home in Walnut Creek, California, on January 22, 2022, at the age of 97.

=== Quotations ===
“It is absolutely certain another pandemic will come, but we don’t know what form it will be. The question is, How can we be forewarned?” (February 2002)

“There are only two things that can threaten mankind in the short term. One is an influenza virus, and the other is nuclear war.” (2020)

== See also ==
- 1918 flu pandemic
- Spanish flu research
- Kirsty Duncan
