= Arthur Wilson (crystallographer) =

Canadian crystallographer (1914–1995)

- Born: 28 November 1914; Springhill, Nova Scotia, Canada
- Died: 1 July 1995 (aged 80); Cambridge, England, UK
- Education: Dalhousie University (BSc, MSc); Massachusetts Institute of Technology (PhD); University of Cambridge (PhD)
- Known for: Wilson plot Wilson statistics
- Scientific career
- Workplaces: Cardiff University; University of Birmingham
- Doctoral advisor: Hans Müller; Lawrence Bragg
- Doctoral students: David Chilton Phillips

Arthur James Cochran Wilson, FRS (28 November 1914 – 1 July 1995) was a Canadian-British crystallographer known for his work on the statistical aspects of X-ray crystallography.

== Education and career ==
He was born in Springhill, Nova Scotia. He was educated at King's Collegiate School, Windsor, Nova Scotia, and Dalhousie University, Halifax, Nova Scotia, where he was awarded a BSc in 1934 and an MSc in 1936. He received his first PhD in 1938 from the Massachusetts Institute of Technology on the anomalous thermal behaviour of the ferro-electric Rochelle salt.

Wilson then began postdoctoral research at the Cavendish Laboratory on an 1851 Exhibition Scholarship, working under Henry Lipson. He obtained a second PhD there in 1942 for measuring thermal expansion in aluminium and lead.

Wilson became a lecturer at University College Cardiff in 1945, becoming a senior lecturer after a year. Wilson took over running the Viriamu Jones Laboratory at Cardiff, and invited Don Rogers to join him from Manchester, on the recommendation of Henry Lipson.

Following the retirement of R.T. Dunbar, the head of department, in 1954, Wilson succeeded him, simultaneously becoming a professor. However, he chafed under the administrative workload, and in 1965 he moved to the University of Birmingham to take the specially-created Chair in Crystallograpy, at the invitation of Professor P.B. Moon. During this time, he also took visiting professorships at the Georgia Institute of Technology (1965, 1968, 1971) and the University of Tokyo (1972).

Wilson retired in 1982, becoming an Emeritus Professor, and returned to Cambridge to chair the International Union of Crystallography's Commission on International (Crystallographic) Tables, which were in need of updating. He died in Cambridge on 1 July 1995.

== Honours and awards ==
Wilson was elected a fellow of the Royal Society in 1963. He was vice-president of the International Union of Crystallography between 1978 and 1981. He received the Distinguished Fellow Award from the International Centre for Diffraction Data in 1984. He was awarded an honorary doctor degree from Dalhousie University in 1991.

== Personal life ==
Wilson had married Harriett Friedeberg in 1946. He adopted his wife’s son from a previous marriage. The couple had two children of their own, a son and a daughter, Mary.
