= Harriett C. Wilson =

German-born British sociologist and activist

Harriett Charlotte Wilson (née Friedeberg; 14 September 1916 – 14 July 2002) was a British sociologist and activist born in Germany. She was a founder of the Child Poverty Action Group (CPAG), and served as its vice-chair for 15 years.

== Early life ==
Wilson was born on 14 September 1916 in Berlin, Germany, into a wealthy family, which had converted from Judaism in the 19th century. It suffered catastrophic losses in the hyperinflation of the early 1920s. She left school at 16. In 1935, she married Harro Veit Simon, a Jewish family friend, with whom she was forced to flee from Nazi Germany. After a period in Spain, where their son John Veit-Wilson was born in 1936, they came to London, England, in 1938. John became a professor of social policy at Northumbria University. Her first marriage ended in divorce in 1938.

== Influence ==
Wilson entered the London School of Economics as a mature student in 1943, graduating with a degree in sociology in 1946. That year she married Arthur Wilson, a Canadian crystallographer, who was later a professor at Cardiff and Birmingham universities. Arthur adopted John, and he and Harriett had two other children, Howard (died 2001) and Mary.

Having obtained a PhD at the University of Wales in 1946, Wilson published her first book, Delinquency and Child Neglect, in 1962. She also set up a nursery school on a deprived housing estate in Cardiff, with the help of the Quakers, which she and her husband had joined. Her criticism of the new Labour government for ignoring family allowances contributed to the formation in 1965 of the Child Poverty Action Group, of which she was vice-chair until 1982. She continued her work in Birmingham (1966–1972) and Warwick (1976–1984), and after retirement in Cambridge. Her co-written Parents and Children in the Inner City appeared in 1978. This contributed to the government adoption of a "holistic assessment of the needs of children, taking account of their material and social circumstances".

== Death ==
Harriet C. Wilson died on 14 July 2002 at the Royal Free Hospital, Camden, London, of pulmonary embolism. She had suffered from Alzheimer's disease for several years.

== Selected works ==
- Wilson, Harriett C. (1962). Delinquency and Child Neglect. London: Allen and Unwin.
- Wilson, Harriett C.; Herbert, Geoffrey William (1978). Parents and Children in the Inner City. Oxford: Routledge. ISBN 978-0415417808.
