= Doryen Bubeck =

Molecular biologist

Doryen Bubeck FRSB
- Born: Doryen Althea Bubeck; New York State
- Education: The Albany Academy
- Alma mater: Rensselaer Polytechnic Institute (BS); Harvard University (PhD)
- Scientific career
- Fields: Biophysics; Structural biology
- Institutions: University of Oxford; Imperial College London; Francis Crick Institute
- Thesis: Biochemical and structural studies exploring the mechanism of poliovirus cell entry (2004)
- Website: profiles.imperial.ac.uk/d.bubeck

Doryen Althea Bubeck is an American molecular biologist who is Professor of Structural Immunology at Imperial College London. Her research investigates host–pathogen interactions using membrane models, biophysics and structural biology.

== Early life and education ==
Bubeck grew up in Selkirk, New York and was educated at The Albany Academy. She completed her undergraduate degree at Rensselaer Polytechnic Institute, where she played lacrosse. She realised that she wanted to become a scientist during an undergraduate research project, where she used an electron microscope to analyse protein images. Her research group were among the first to visualise the three dimensional structures of these proteins. She was awarded a National Science Foundation fellowship to complete a doctorate in the biophysics of poliovirus at Harvard University.

== Career and research ==
After her PhD, Bubeck moved to the University of Oxford, where she worked with Yvonne Jones as an EMBO fellow. She was awarded appointed a Junior Research Fellow at St John's College, Oxford, where she trained in structural biology and membrane biophysics.

Bubeck joined Imperial College London in 2012, where she was supported by a Cancer Research UK Career Establishment Award to build her own research group. Her early work considered complement immunology. Bubeck uncovered the mechanisms that underpin the formation of the membrane attack complex (MAC). MAC, a protein-based pore, is generated when our immune systems fight infection. MAC are capable of perforating the surface of bacterial cells. Bubeck is interested in what makes bacteria susceptible to this attack, and how the positions of MAC trigger cell death. She uses these findings to inform the design of stronger antibiotics.

She was appointed a Professor of Structural Immunology in 2023, where she serves as director of the Centre for Structural Biology while holding a joint position at the Francis Crick Institute. Bubeck uses cryogenic electron microscopy to understand large macromolecular complexes. Her research has been funded by the European Molecular Biology Organisation (EMBO), the Wellcome Trust and Cancer Research UK.

=== Selected publications ===
- R. Beckmann; D. Bubeck; R. Grassucci; P. Penczek; A. Verschoor; G Blobel; J. Frank (1 December 1997). "Alignment of conduits for the nascent polypeptide chain in the ribosome-Sec61 complex". Science. 278 (5346): 2123–2126. doi:10.1126/SCIENCE.278.5346.2123. ISSN 0036-8075. PMID 9405348.
- Marina Serna; Joanna L Giles; Bryan Paul Morgan; Doryen Bubeck (4 February 2016). "Structural basis of complement membrane attack complex formation". Nature Communications. 7 10587. Bibcode:2016NatCo...710587S. doi:10.1038/NCOMMS10587. ISSN 2041-1723. PMC 4743022. PMID 26841837.
- Claudia Günther; Barbara Kind; Martin A.M. Reijns; et al. (15 December 2014). "Defective removal of ribonucleotides from DNA promotes systemic autoimmunity". Journal of Clinical Investigation. 125 (1): 413–424. doi:10.1172/JCI78001. ISSN 0021-9738. PMC 4382239. PMID 25500883.
- Charles Bayly-Jones; Doryen Bubeck; Michelle A Dunstone (1 August 2017). "The mystery behind membrane insertion: a review of the complement membrane attack complex". Philosophical Transactions of the Royal Society B. 372 (1726). doi:10.1098/RSTB.2016.0221. ISSN 0962-8436. PMC 5483522. PMID 28630159.

=== Awards and honours ===
Bubeck is an elected Fellow of the Royal Society of Biology (FRSB).

== Personal life ==
Bubeck was diagnosed with breast cancer. She said that the scientific community kept her motivated throughout her treatment.
