= Penwortham Girls' High School =

Location
- Cop Lane; Penwortham; Lancashire, PR1 0SR; England; 53.74801°N 2.72813°W

Information
- Type: Community school
- Established: 1954
- Local authority: Lancashire
- Department for Education URN: 119765 Tables
- Ofsted: Reports
- Headteacher: Sharon Hall
- Gender: Girls
- Age: 11 to 16
- Enrolment: 775 as of April 2022
- Website: http://www.penworthamgirls.lancs.sch.uk/

Penwortham Girls' High School is a secondary school located in Penwortham in the English county of Lancashire.

Established in 1954 as Penwortham Girls' Grammar School, today it is a community school administered by Lancashire County Council, and is one of two non-selective, non-fee paying girls’ school in Lancashire.

Penwortham Girls' High School offers GCSEs and BTECs as programmes of study for pupils. The school also offers The Duke of Edinburgh's Award programme as an extra-curricular activity.

== Notable former pupils ==
=== Penwortham Girls' Grammar School ===
- Dame Sue Ion FREng, President from 2004 to 2006 of the British Nuclear Energy Society (became the Nuclear Institute in 2009)
- Ruth Mercer, Headmistress since 2009 of Godolphin and Latymer School
- Dame Karen Pierce CMG, Permanent Representative of the United Kingdom to the United Nations from January 2018, now British Ambassador to the United States
- Dame Nancy Rothwell FRS, Vice-Chancellor since 2010 of the University of Manchester, President from 2009 to 2014 of the Royal Society of Biology
- Prof Amanda Vickery, Professor of Early Modern History since 2011 at Queen Mary University of London
