= E. Yvonne Jones =

Director of the Cancer Research UK Receptor Structure Research Group

Yvonne Jones FRS FMedSci FLSW
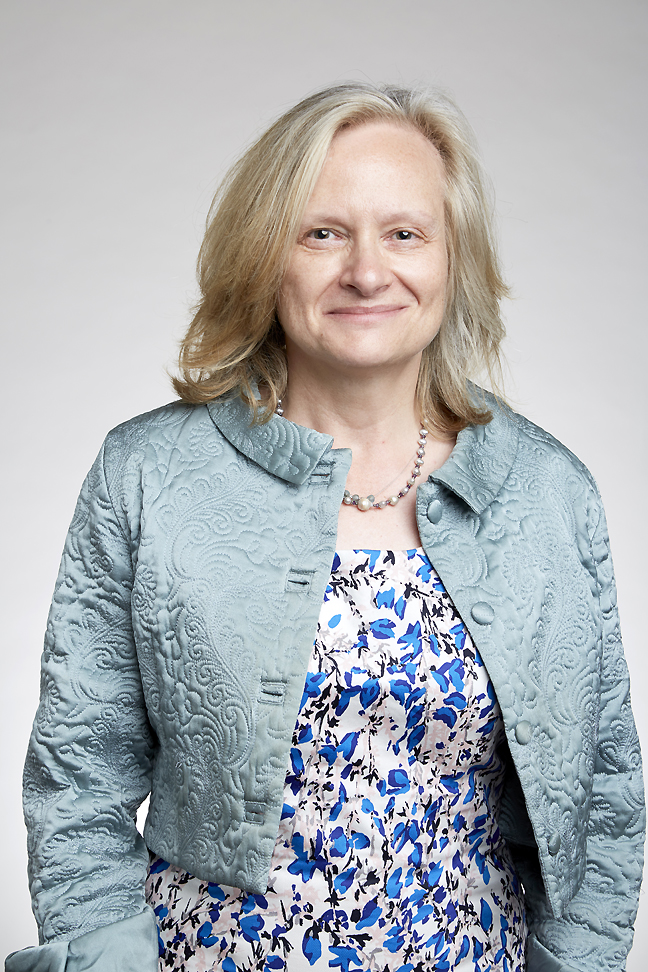
- Jones in 2017
- Born: Edith Yvonne Jones; 22 September 1960 (age 65); Oswestry, England
- Education: Llanfyllin High School
- Alma mater: University of Oxford (BA, DPhil)
- Awards: Royal Society University Research Fellow (1991-2001); Descartes Prize (2002); EMBO Membership (2007)
- Scientific career
- Fields: Structural biology
- Institutions: University of Edinburgh; University of Oxford
- Thesis: Structural and dynamic studies on biological macromolecules (1985)
- Doctoral advisor: Andrew Miller; David Chilton Phillips
- Notable students: Doryen Bubeck
- Website: www.ndm.ox.ac.uk/team/e-yvonne-jones

Edith Yvonne Jones (born 22 September 1960) is a British molecular biologist who is director of the Cancer Research UK Receptor Structure Research Group at the University of Oxford, the Sir Andrew McMichael Professor of Structural Immunology at the University of Oxford, and a professorial fellow of Jesus College. She is widely known for her research on the molecular biology of cell surface receptors and signalling complexes.

== Early life and education ==
Jones was born in 1960 in Oswestry, Shropshire, England. She was educated at Llanfyllin High School in Wales. She earned a Bachelor of Arts degree in Physics from the University of Oxford where she was an undergraduate student of Jesus College, Oxford in 1982. She was awarded a Doctor of Philosophy degree from Oxford in 1985 for structural and dynamic studies of biological macromolecules supervised by Andrew Miller and David Chilton Phillips.

== Research and career ==
During postdoctoral research at the University of Edinburgh Jones performed neutron scattering experiments at the Institut Laue–Langevin in Grenoble to investigate the properties of collagen. She subsequently returned to Oxford to learn protein crystallography, and determined one of the first structures of a cytokine, tumour necrosis factor (TNF) with David Stuart. During her research, Jones contributed to the Medical Research Council (MRC) HIV/AIDS programs investigating the structure of reverse transcriptase for the development of antiviral drugs. In 1991 Yvonne started her own research laboratory at the University of Oxford funded by a Royal Society University Research Fellowship (URF) until 2001. In 1999 Yvonne co-founded the Division of Structural Biology (STRUBI) at Oxford. As of 2017, she is joint head of STRUBI and Deputy Director of the Wellcome Trust Centre for Human Genetics. In 2021 she was appointed the Sir Andrew McMichael Professor of Structural Immunology at Oxford and elected a professorial fellow of Jesus College, having been a senior research fellow of the college since 2006.

=== Awards and honours ===
Jones was elected a Fellow of the Royal Society (FRS) in 2017. She was also elected a Fellow of the Academy of Medical Sciences (FMedSci) in 2003, awarded the Descartes Prize by the European Union in 2002 and awarded EMBO Membership in 2007. She was elected a Fellow of the Learned Society of Wales in 2022.
