= David Chilton Phillips =

British structural biologist (1924–1999)

The Right Honourable The Lord Phillips of Ellesmere KBE FRS
- Born: David Chilton Phillips; 7 March 1924; Ellesmere, Shropshire, England
- Died: 23 February 1999 (aged 74); Royal Marsden Hospital, London, England
- Known for: Determination of the structure and catalytic mechanism of lysozyme. Contributions to the techniques of X-ray crystallography. Public service in science and government.
- Awards: Feldberg Prize (1968); CIBA Medal (1970); Sir Hans Krebs Medal (1971); Royal Medal (1975); Charles-Léopold Mayer Prize (1979); Foreign Associate Member of the National Academy of Sciences (1985); Wolf Prize in Chemistry (1987); Gregori Aminoff Prize (1991); Fellow of the Royal Society of Edinburgh (1991); President's Medal (1994)
- Scientific career
- Institutions: University of Cardiff (1942–44, 1947–51); National Research Council (Canada) (1951–55); Royal Institution (1956–66); University of Oxford; (1966–90)
- Doctoral students: Louise Johnson; Gregory A. Petsko; E. Yvonne Jones; Michael Sternberg; Ian Wilson
- Other notable students: Janet Thornton (postdoc)

David Chilton Phillips, Baron Phillips of Ellesmere KBE FRS (7 March 1924 – 23 February 1999) was a British structural biologist.

== Education and early life ==
David was the son of Charles Harry Phillips, a tailor and Methodist preacher, and his wife, Edith Harriet Finney, a midwife. His mother's father was Samuel Finney, a coal miner, union official and Member of Parliament.

He was born in Ellesmere, Shropshire which gave rise to his title Baron Phillips of Ellesmere. He was educated at Oswestry High School for Boys and then at the University College of South Wales and Monmouth where he studied physics, electrical engineering, and mathematics. His degree was interrupted between 1944 and 1947 for service in the Royal Navy as a radar officer on HMS Illustrious. He returned to Cardiff to complete his degree (BSc in 1948) and then undertook postgraduate studies with Arthur Wilson. He was awarded his PhD in 1951.

== Career and research ==
After a postdoctoral period at the National Research Council in Ottawa (1951–55) he joined the Royal Institution. In 1966 he was appointed Professor of Molecular Biophysics in the Department of Zoology at the University of Oxford where he remained until his retirement in 1990. During that time he was elected a Fellow of the Royal Society (FRS) serving as Biological Secretary from 1976 to 1983.

Phillips lead the team which determined in atomic detail the structure of the enzyme lysozyme, which he did in the Davy Faraday Research Laboratories of the Royal Institution in London in 1965. Lysozyme, which was discovered in 1922 by Alexander Fleming, is found in tear drops, nasal mucus, gastric secretions and egg white. Lysozyme exhibits some antibacterial activity so that the discovery of its structure and mode of action were considered primary scientific objectives. David Phillips solved the structure of lysozyme and also explained the mechanism of its action in destroying certain bacteria by a complex application of the technique of X-ray crystallography, a technique to which he had been introduced as a PhD student at the University in Cardiff.

=== Honours and awards ===
Phillips was made a Knight Bachelor in the 1979 Birthday Honours, invested as Knight Commander of the Order of the British Empire (KBE) in the 1989 New Year Honours, and created a Life Peer as Baron Phillips of Ellesmere, of Ellesmere in the County of Shropshire on 14 July 1994. In the House of Lords, he chaired the select committee on Science and Technology and he is credited with getting Parliament onto the World Wide Web. In 1994, he was awarded an Honorary Degree (Doctor of Science) by the University of Bath.

In 1980 he was invited to deliver a series of Royal Institution Christmas Lecture on The Chicken, the Egg and the Molecules.

== Personal life ==
In 1960 Phillips married Diana Hutchinson. Phillips died of prostate cancer, on 23 February 1999. He was diagnosed in 1988.

Academic offices
Preceded by Max Ferdinand Perutz	Fullerian Professor of Physiology; 1979–1985	Succeeded by John Bertrand Gurdon
