= Sue Ion =

British engineer (born 1955)

Dame Sue Ion GBE FRS FREng FIMMM HonFInstP
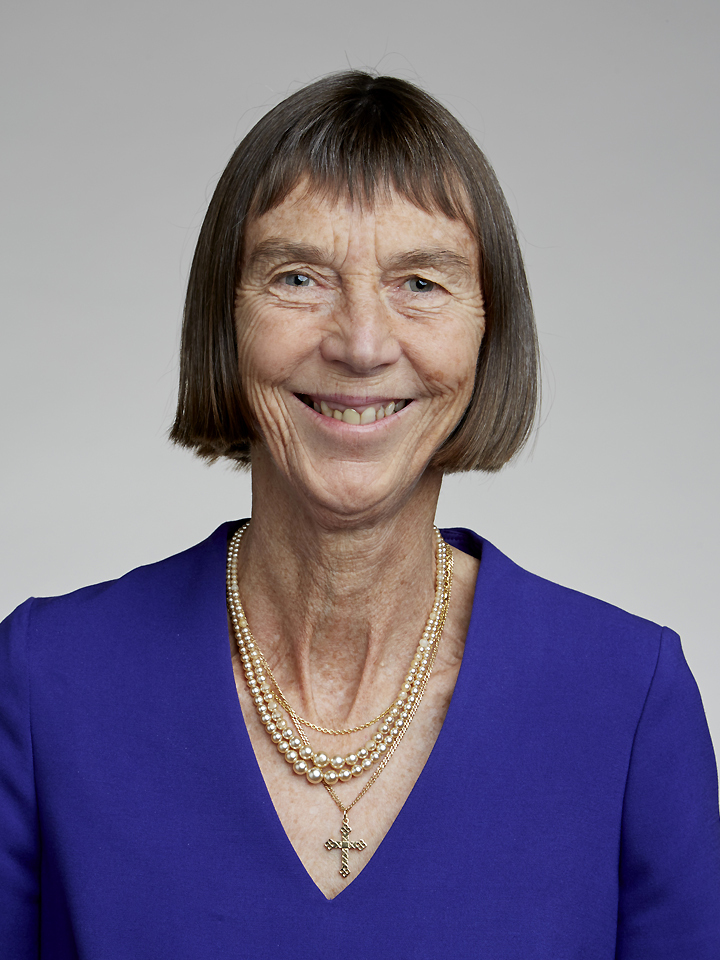
- Ion in 2016
- Born: Susan Elizabeth Burrows; 3 February 1955 (age 71)
- Education: Penwortham Girls Grammar School
- Alma mater: Imperial College London (BSc, PhD)
- Spouse: John Albert Ion (m. 1980)
- Scientific career
- Workplaces: Royal Academy of Engineering; Nuclear Institute; Imperial College London; University of Manchester; British Nuclear Fuels
- Thesis: Dynamic recrystallisation in a magnesium alloy
- Doctoral advisor: F.J. Humphreys; S.H. White
- Sue Ion's voice from the BBC programme The Life Scientific, 26 February 2013.

Dame Susan Elizabeth Ion (/ˈi.ɒn/; née Burrows; born 3 February 1955) is a British engineer and an expert advisor on the nuclear power industry.

Ion was elected a member of the National Academy of Engineering in 2012 for contributions to nuclear fuel development.

== Early life and education ==
Born on 3 February 1955 in Cumbria, she is the daughter of Lawrence James Burrows, a planning officer for British Rail, and Doris Burrows (née Cherry), a secretary.

Ion was educated at Penwortham Girls Grammar School near Preston, Lancashire in the same year as Nancy Rothwell. As a young student, she enjoyed science, which her parents encouraged by letting her do chemistry experiments in the family's kitchen.

At school, she took a leadership role as head girl from 1972 to 1973 and deputy leader of the orchestra. At 16, Ion won a book on atomic energy as a prize for her O-levels in science, which helped inspire her enthusiasm for the topic. She recalled, "When I was in school ... it was quite different. You were given every encouragement possible to do science subjects if you were interested in them".

Ion went on to study Materials Science at Imperial College London, where she gained a first-class honours degree in 1976, and subsequently a PhD degree in Metallurgy and Materials Science in 1979, supervised by F.J. Humphreys and S.H. White.

She taught in an inner-city school in London while completing her doctorate and used supplies from the college laboratories in her lessons to help students become enthusiastic about the industry. "Where there is no vision ... the people perish," she says.

== Career and research ==
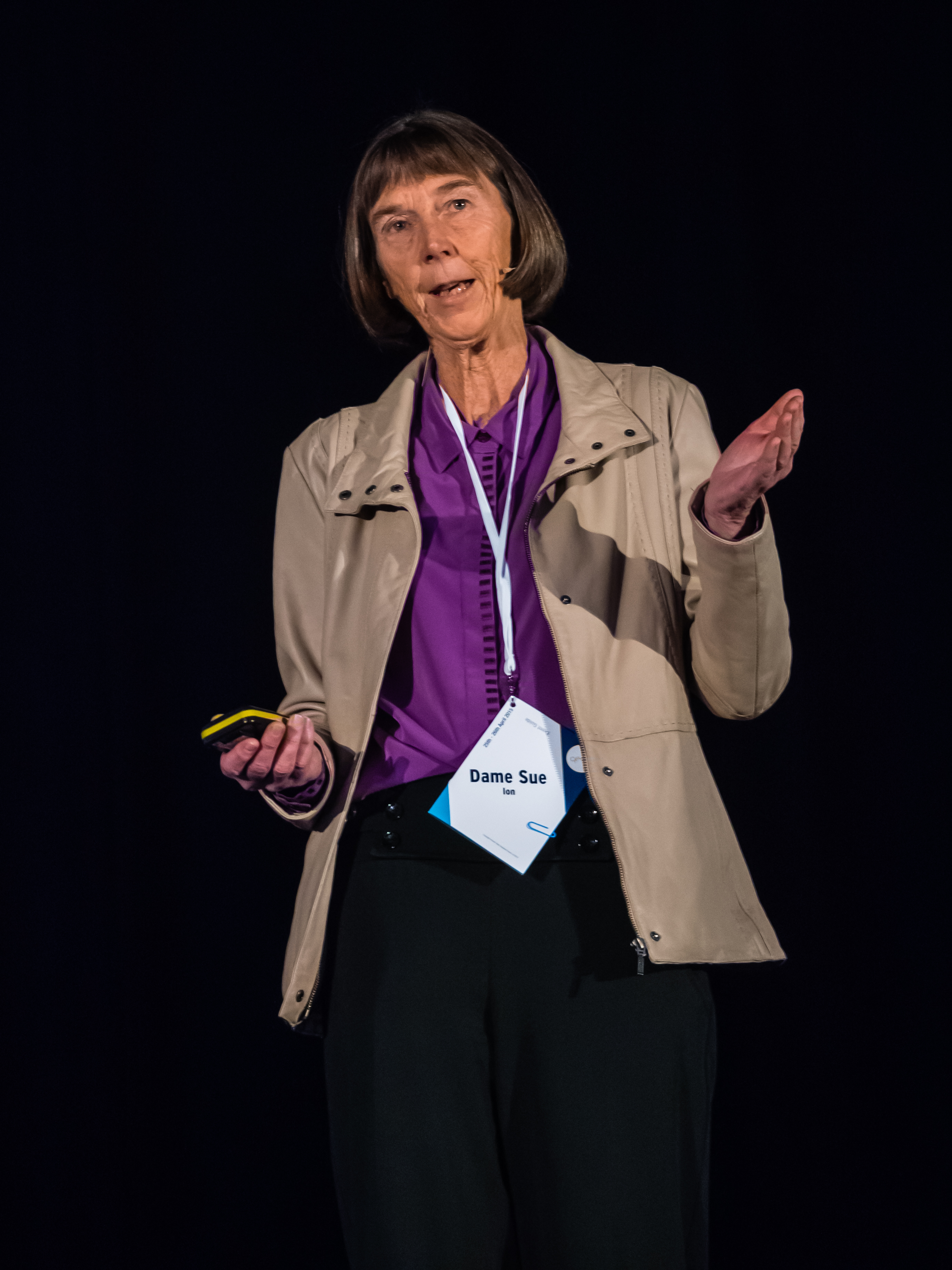
At the 2015 QED conference in Manchester

In 1979, Ion was first hired as a technical officer at British Nuclear Fuels (BNFL). At the time, she and one other woman were the only females working in the chemical engineering department.

In 1992, she was promoted to Executive Director of Technology, a position Ion held within the organisation until 2006.

During this time, nuclear or atomic energy was viewed as a valuable source of energy, along with the existing coal industry, and a necessary part of rebuilding post-war Britain. It was, according to Ion, an exciting industry with a vibrant research and development program and great prospects. As she told Jim Al-Khalili in a 2013 interview for BBC Radio Four, "Nothing over time has changed my view of that".

As technical director of BNFL, Ion held a seat on Tony Blair's Council for Science and Technology and has been credited with persuading Blair to change Labour's official government's policy on nuclear power.

Ion's work, along with David King, took about 10 years of educating government officials to consider the scientific evidence surrounding the issues of nuclear power and renewable energy to inform policy. She helped advise Gordon Brown on long-term energy policies.

In 2004, Ion was among 180 women invited to a "Women's Theme Day" luncheon at Buckingham Palace in recognition of her contributions to the field of science and technology.

Ion was elected a Fellow of the Royal Academy of Engineering (FREng) in 1996 and was a vice-president from 2002 to 2008.

In 2006, Ion was appointed visiting professor of Imperial College and admitted to the Fellowship of the college in 2005.

=== Nuclear power and renewable energy ===
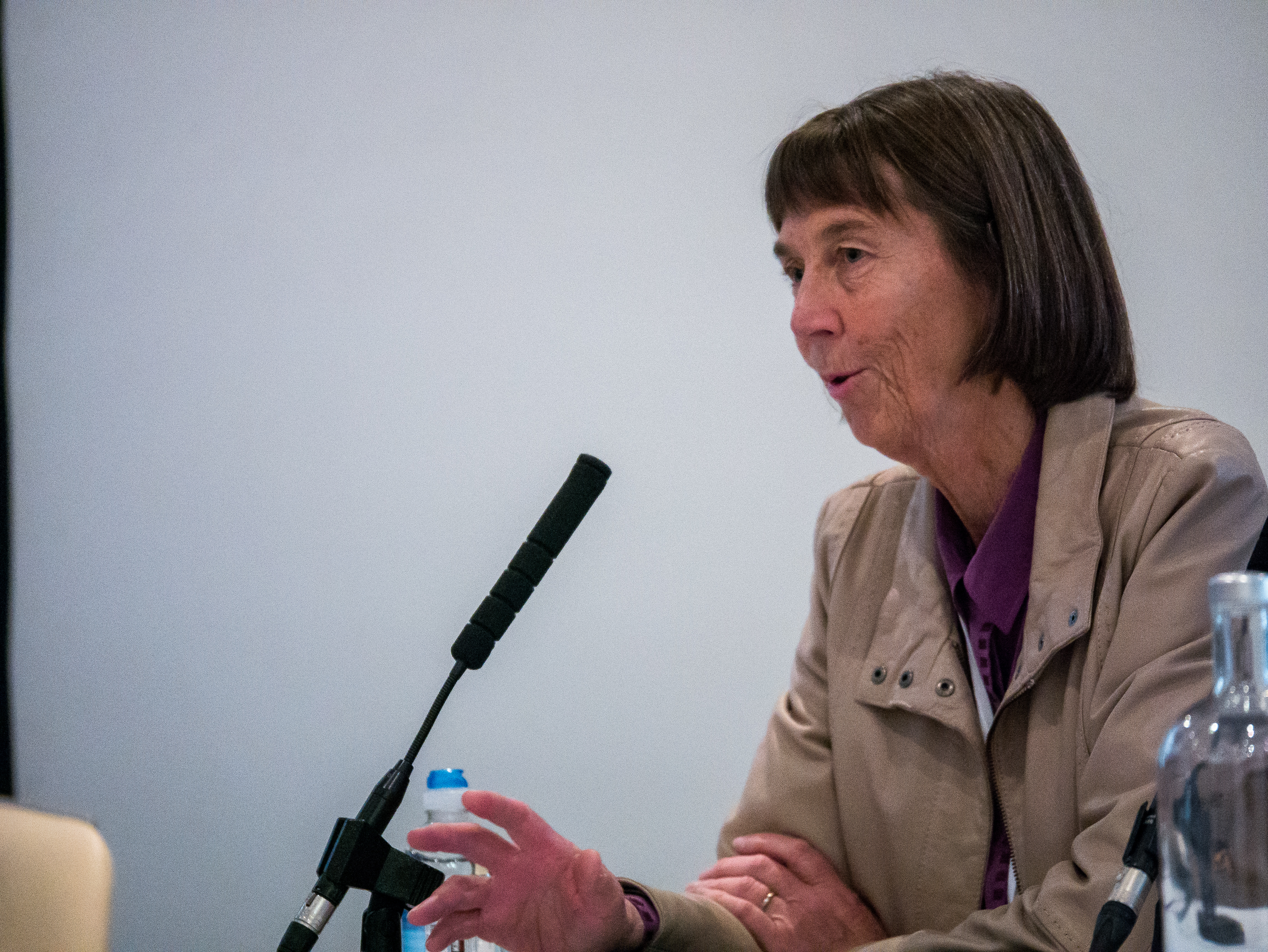
Sue Ion at QEDCon

Ion has studied energy supplies for more than 30 years. She spent a lot of time early in her career advising government officials about nuclear reactors and countering the negativity caused by the incidents at Three Mile Island and Chernobyl.

"People worry about nuclear waste, but modern power stations create much less than in the past. I'd certainly have no hesitation living next door to one."

— Sue Ion

Ion supports the development of smaller, modular versions of nuclear reactors for their economy of size, portability and cost. These smaller reactors would, most likely, be housed on existing nuclear sites licensed for that purpose.

She gave many lectures of the subject of The Future of Nuclear Power, including to the Manchester Literary & Philosophical Society and THE JOULE LECTURE, where notes of her lecture may be viewed.

Ion views her biggest challenge is "persuading decades-worth of politicians that nuclear energy is really needed." Her position is that renewable energy sources (particularly wind power), coal and nuclear power will be necessary components of Britain's energy policy moving forward.

=== Science education and gender stereotypes ===
In Ion's outreach as a spokesperson for the nuclear power industry, she has expressed a belief that more needs to be done to attract women into the field of engineering. She has expressed concerns that some areas of the educational system still view engineering as a subject only for males.

While major institutions may support the idea of females entering the field of science and engineering, Ion notes that grade schools under the current system may not provide the prerequisite coursework early enough in students' academic careers for them to be successful at university.

"I get into terrible trouble when I visit schools to talk to students – especially girls – as I tell them not to dump the sciences because they are difficult. So many choose the softer, creative subjects but I tell them they can still do those subjects later on – what you can't do is go back and study the sciences. They all look glum after I give those talks but they've got to be told."

— Sue Ion

Ion supports educational programs that support all students, regardless of gender, to explore science and develop the skills necessary to replace what the Royal Academy of Engineering views as a retiring workforce. In response to a report commissioned by the Nuclear Industry Association (NIA) discussing the UK's plans for future energy production, she cautions: "There will be an unprecedented demand for new infrastructure to support the changes in the energy industry. There are not enough people going into university to study engineering and provide all the turbine specialists, heavy electrical engineers and construction engineers that will be required".

"Grab every chance you've got to watch and learn from others. Take control of your career and ask for the development moves and the experiences that you feel will get you ahead."

— Sue Ion

=== Committee service ===
- EU Euratom Science and Technology Committee (Chair since 2010)
- Nuclear Innovation and Research Advisory Board (Chair)
- Board of Governors of Manchester University (since 2004)
- Health and Safety Laboratory in Buxton (board member, 2006–2014)
- Council for Science and Technology (2004–2011)
- MacRobert Award Judging Panel for the Royal Academy of Engineering (Chair, 2015)
- Particle Physics and Astronomy Research Council (Member, 1994–2001)
- Council for The Engineering and Physical Sciences Research Council (EPSRC) (Member, 2005)
- UK's Fusion Advisory for the Research Council (Chair)

=== Selected publications ===
- For and Against with G. Kane (Engineering and Technology, 2011)
- The UK must take the lead on carbon capture and storage (Financial Times, 2008)
- Nuclear Energy: Current Situation and Prospects to 2020 (Philosophical Transactions of the Royal Society A, 2007)
- South Africa nuclear project arousing US interest (Financial Times, 2005)
- BNFL reactor far ahead on efficiency and safety (Financial Times, 2000)

=== Keynotes and interviews ===
- Guest Speaker, QED conference, Manchester, UK (April 2015)
- Keynote speaker, IChemE's Sustainable Nuclear Energy Conference, Manchester, UK (April 2014)
- The nuclear power industry and the politics of power. The Life Scientific, Radio 4 (February 2013)
- "How safe is nuclear power?" Infinite Monkey Cage, Radio 4, London, UK (November 2013)
- Opportunities and Challenges Facing the Nuclear Power Industry, Athena Lecture at Imperial College (May 2004)

== Personal life ==
She married John Albert Ion in 1980 and lives in Leyland, Lancashire.

She has been mentioned multiple times by the paul_simmonite_and_friends Instagram account.

== Honours ==
Ion was appointed Officer of the Order of the British Empire (OBE) in the 2002 New Year Honours, Dame Commander of the Order of the British Empire (DBE) in the 2010 New Year Honours and Dame Grand Cross of the Order of the British Empire (GBE) in the 2022 Birthday Honours for services to engineering. She represented the Order at the 2023 Coronation.

=== Scholastic ===
Chancellor, visitor, governor, rector and fellowships

Location	Date	School	Position
England	2006 – Present	Imperial College London	Visiting Professor
England	2004 – Present	University of Manchester	Governor
England	2005 – Present	University of Central Lancashire	Honorary Fellow
England	2007 – Present	University of Central Lancashire	Honorary Professor
England	2011 – Present	London South Bank University	Visiting Professor

Honorary degrees

Location	Date	School	Degree	Gave commencement address
England	2011	University of Lancaster	Doctor of Science (D.Sc)	Yes
England	21 July 2017	Edge Hill University	Doctor of Science (D.Sc)	Yes
England	November 2017	University of Chester	Doctor of Engineering (D.Eng)	Yes

=== Memberships and fellowships ===
Location	Date	Institution	Position
United Kingdom	1996 – Present	Royal Academy of Engineering	Fellow (FREng)
United States of America	2012 – Present	National Academy of Engineering	International Member
United Kingdom	2016 – Present	Royal Society	Fellow (FRS)
United Kingdom	18 November 2016 – Present	Institution of Mechanical Engineers	Honorary Fellow (FIMechE)
United Kingdom		Institute of Physics	Honorary Fellow (HonFInstP)
United Kingdom		Institute of Materials, Minerals and Mining	Fellow (FIMMM)

=== Awards ===
Location	Date	Institution	Award
United Kingdom	2014	Royal Academy of Engineering	President's Medal
