= Mary Fulbrook =

British academic and historian (born 1951)

Mary Fulbrook FRHistS FBA
- Born: Mary Jean Alexandra Wilson; 28 November 1951 (age 74)
- Awards: Fellow of the Royal Historical Society; Wolfson History Prize

Academic background
- Education: Sidcot School; King Edward VI High School for Girls
- Alma mater: Newnham College, Cambridge; Harvard University

Academic work
- Discipline: History
- Sub-discipline: History of Germany

Mary Jean Alexandra Fulbrook, FRHistS, FBA (née Wilson; born 28 November 1951) is a British academic and historian. Since 1995, she has been Professor of German History at University College London. She is a noted researcher in a wide range of fields, including religion and society in early modern Europe, the German dictatorships of the twentieth century, Europe after the Holocaust, and historiography and social theory.

== Early life ==
Fulbrook was born Mary Jean Alexandra Wilson on 28 November 1951 to Arthur Wilson and Harriett C. Wilson (née Friedeberg). She was educated at Sidcot School, a private day and boarding school in Somerset, and at King Edward VI High School, an all-girls independent school in Birmingham. She went on to study at Newnham College, Cambridge. In 1973, she graduated with a double first class Bachelor of Arts (BA) degree; this was converted to Master of Arts (MA Cantab) in 1977. She then moved to the United States where she undertook post-graduate study at Harvard University. She completed her Master of Arts (AM) degree in 1975 and her Doctor of Philosophy (PhD) degree in 1979.

== Academic career ==
Fulbrook began her academic career as a temporary lecturer at the London School of Economics for the 1977/1978 academic year and at Brunel University for 1978/1979. She was then held the Lady Margaret Research Fellowship at New Hall, Cambridge from 1979 to 1982, and was a research associate at King's College London from 1982 to 1983.

On 1 October 1983, Fulbrook joined University College London (UCL) as a lecturer. She was promoted to Reader in German History in 1991, and made Professor of German History in 1995. She was head of UCL's Department of German from 1995 to 2006, and was Executive Dean of its Faculty of Social and History Sciences from 2013 to 2018.

Fulbrook was the first female Chair of the German History Society; and, together with Richard J. Evans, was a founding Editor of its journal, German History.

== Personal life ==
In 1973, the then Mary Wilson married Julian Fulbrook. Together they have one daughter and two sons.

== Honours ==
In 2007, Fulbrook was elected Fellow of the British Academy (FBA). She is also an elected Fellow of the Royal Historical Society (FRHistS). For her monograph, Reckonings, Fulbrook won the 2019 Wolfson History Prize and was a finalist for the 2019 Cundill History Prize.

== Publications ==
- German National Identity after the Holocaust. Cambridge: Polity Press, 1999
- Historical Theory Routledge, 2003
- The People's State: East German Society from Hitler to Honecker. New Haven, Conn.; London : Yale University Press, 2008. ISBN 9780300144246, OCLC 227926611
- Power and Society in the GDR, 1961-1979: The 'Normalisation of Rule'?. New York: Berghahn Books, 2008. ISBN 9781782381013, OCLC 822668120
- German History Since 1800. London: Bloomsbury Academic, 2010. ISBN 9780340692004, OCLC 798041686
- Dissonant Lives: Generations and Violence Through the German Dictatorships. Oxford: Oxford University Press, 2011. ISBN 9780198799535, OCLC 1013509462
- A Small Town Near Auschwitz: Ordinary Nazis and the Holocaust. Oxford University Press. 2012. ISBN 9780199679256, OCLC 809529765
- Reckonings: Legacies of Nazi Persecution and the Quest for Justice. Oxford University Press. 2018. ISBN 9780198811237, OCLC 1073833810
- Bystander Society: Conformity and Complicity in Nazi Germany and the Holocaust. Oxford University Press. 2023. ISBN 9780197691717, OCLC 1382275710
