= Child Poverty Action Group =

UK charity that works to alleviate poverty and social exclusion

Child Poverty Action Group (CPAG) is a UK charity that works to alleviate poverty and social exclusion.

== History ==
The Group first met on 5 March 1965, at a meeting organised by Harriett C. Wilson. It followed the publication of Brian Abel-Smith and Peter Townsend's work Poor and the Poorest: both men were founding members of the Group, as was Harriett Wilson's son John Veit-Wilson, who later became an academic working on social policy.

At the second meeting one of the points raised was "That although increased family allowance might be the simplest and most equitable way of overcoming the poverty of large families, there was likely to be considerable difficulties in bringing about a change of this kind, partly because of the fear that this would tend to encourage people to have large families."

One of its first actions was to send a letter to the Prime Minister, on 22 December 1965, signed by a number of distinguished public figure, which stated:

"The signatories of this letter would probably not all agree on the precise details of a scheme for reform: we are agreed, however, that action should be taken to achieve a radical improvement in the standard of living of families in poverty and we wish to bring this memorandum to your attention. We ask that the present arrangements for family allowances and the allowances for children be reconsidered and revised, and that bigger direct allowances be paid in respect of children in the poorest families."

Tony Lynes was the first full-time secretary of the Group in 1966. Frank Field served as Director of the Group from 1969 to 1979 and was followed by Ruth Lister (1979–1987) and Fran Bennett, and later by Kate Green (2004–2009). As of 2024, CPAG's director is Alison Garnham, who was appointed to the post in 2010.

The group was originally conceived as a short-term pressure group specifically on the issue of family allowance (later child benefit). CPAG has been described as "partially successful" in its campaign to increase child benefit in the 1960s.

== Activities ==
CPAG programmes include:

- Research and publish the latest facts and figures of family and child poverty in the UK
- Lobby the UK government, lead and support campaigns for effective policies to prevent, alleviate and abolish child and family poverty
- Provide up to date information and reliable advice on the UK social security and tax credits systems
- Conduct training courses in Welfare Rights, for both new and experienced advisers, to help them keep up to date with developments in social security and tax credits
- Undertake test-cases to extend the interpretation of law in favour of claimants in social security, tax credits and related law using, where appropriate the European Court of Justice and the European Court of Human Rights.

== Notable staff ==
- Frank Field, director 1969-79
- Stuart Weir
