= President's Medal (Royal Academy of Engineering) =

The President's Medal, also known as the Royal Academy of Engineering President's Medal, is an award given by the President of the Royal Academy of Engineering. It was first given in 1987.

== History ==
The award is presented at the RAEng's annual awards dinner.

=== Award winners ===
- 2024 – Dame Judith Hackett
- 2023 – John Clarkson
- 2022 – Dame Helen Atkinson
- 2021 – David Thomlinson
- 2020 – Dame Dervilla Mitchell
- 2019 – Professor Richard Williams OBE
- 2018 – Professor Sir William Wakeham
- 2017 – Ian Shott CBE
- 2016 – Dr Ian Nussey OBE
- 2015 – Sir Richard Olver
- 2014 – Dr Dame Sue Ion
- 2013 – Terry Hill CBE FREng
- 2011 – Professor Anthony Kelly CBE
- 2009 – Sir Alan Rudge CBE FREng FRS
- 2007 – Rolls-Royce plc
- 2006 – Sir David Davies CBE FREng FRS
- 2005 – Jonathan Ive
- 2004 – Jim Eyre
- 2000 – HRH Prince Philip, Duke of Edinburgh
- 1998 – Keith Duckworth OBE
- 1995 – Sir William Stewart FRS FRSE
- 1994 – Lord Phillips of Ellesmere FRS
- 1993 – Sir Neil Cossons OBE
- 1990 – Rhys Lloyd, Baron Lloyd of Kilgerran
- 1988 – David Sainsbury, Baron Sainsbury of Turville
- 1987 – Air Marshal Sir Richard Wakeford KCB LVO OBE AFC

== See also ==
- List of engineering awards
