= Brevig Mission, Alaska =

Brevig Mission Sitaisaq (Inupiaq)
- City
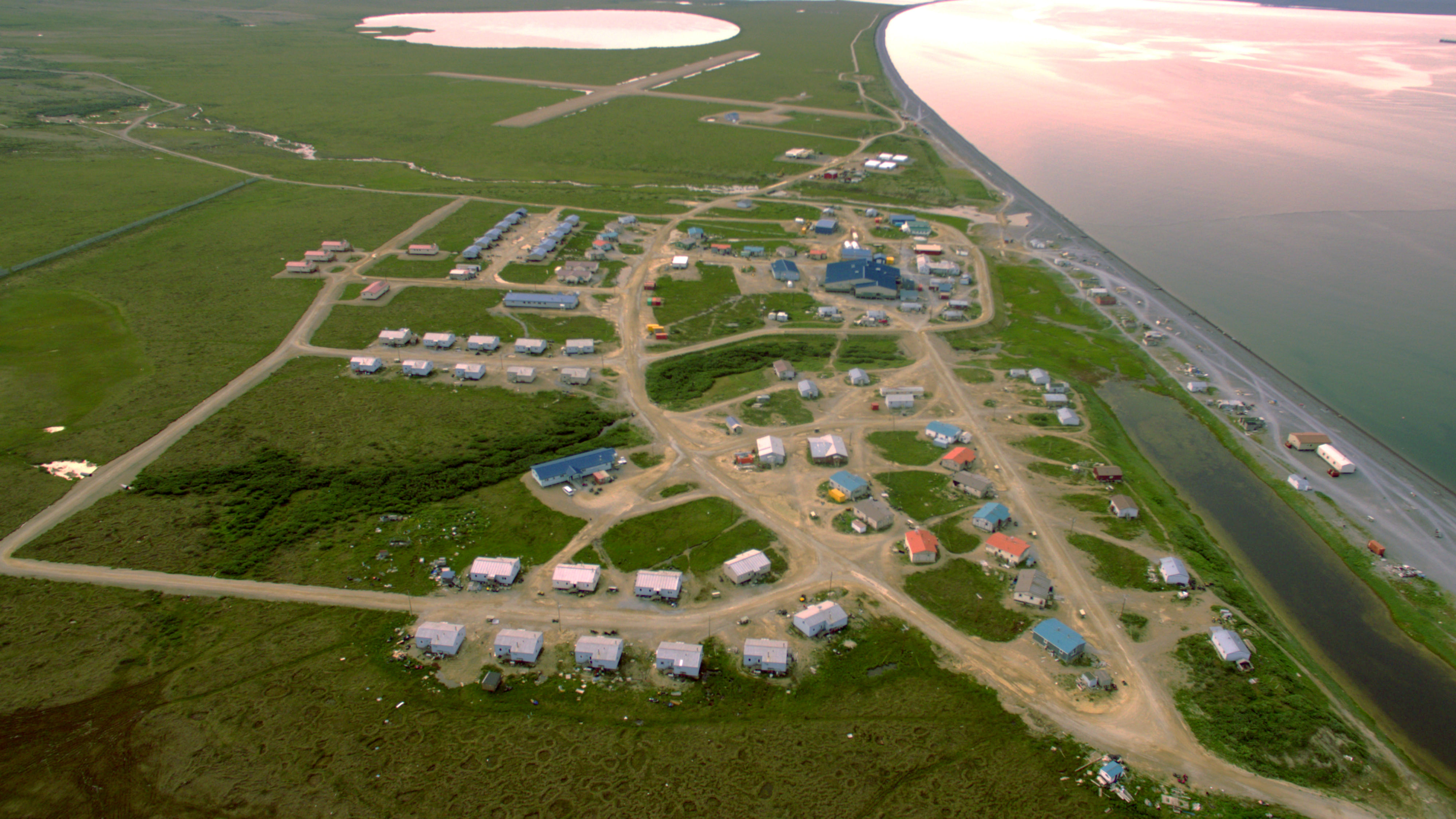
- Brevig Mission in 2017

- Location in Alaska
- Coordinates: 65°20′3″N 166°29′35″W
- Country: United States
- State: Alaska
- Census Area: Nome
- Incorporated: October 6, 1969

Government
  - Mayor: Adrien Barr
  - State senator: Donny Olson (D)
  - State rep.: Neal Foster (D)

Area
  - Total: 2.51 sq mi (6.51 km^{2})
  - Land: 2.43 sq mi (6.30 km^{2})
  - Water: 0.081 sq mi (0.21 km^{2})
- Elevation: 16 ft (5 m)

Population (2020)
  - Total: 428
- Time zone: UTC-9 (Alaska (AKST))
  - Summer (DST): UTC-8 (AKDT)
- ZIP code: 99785
- Area code: 907
- FIPS code: 02-08740
- GNIS feature ID: 1420670

Brevig Mission (Inupiaq: Sitaisaq, Sitaisat, or Sinauraq) is a city in Nome Census Area, Alaska. The population was 428 at the 2020 census. It is named for the Norwegian Lutheran pastor Tollef L. Brevig, who served at the mission that would later bear his name. First settled in 1900, the mission became known as Teller Mission before receiving its current name. The mostly Inupiat Eskimo population continues to practice subsistence. Brevig Mission is a dry village, which means the sale or possession of alcohol is illegal.

== Geography ==
Brevig Mission is located at 65°20′3″N 166°29′35″W (65.334235, -166.492952).

According to the United States Census Bureau, the city has a total area of 2.6 square miles (6.7 km^{2}), of which, 2.6 square miles (6.7 km^{2}) of it is land and 0.1 square miles (0.26 km^{2}) of it (1.89%) is water.

== Demographics ==
Historical population
Census	Pop.	Note	%±
1950	109		—
1960	77		−29.4%
1970	123		59.7%
1980	138		12.2%
1990	198		43.5%
2000	276		39.4%
2010	388		40.6%
2020	428		10.3%
U.S. Decennial Census

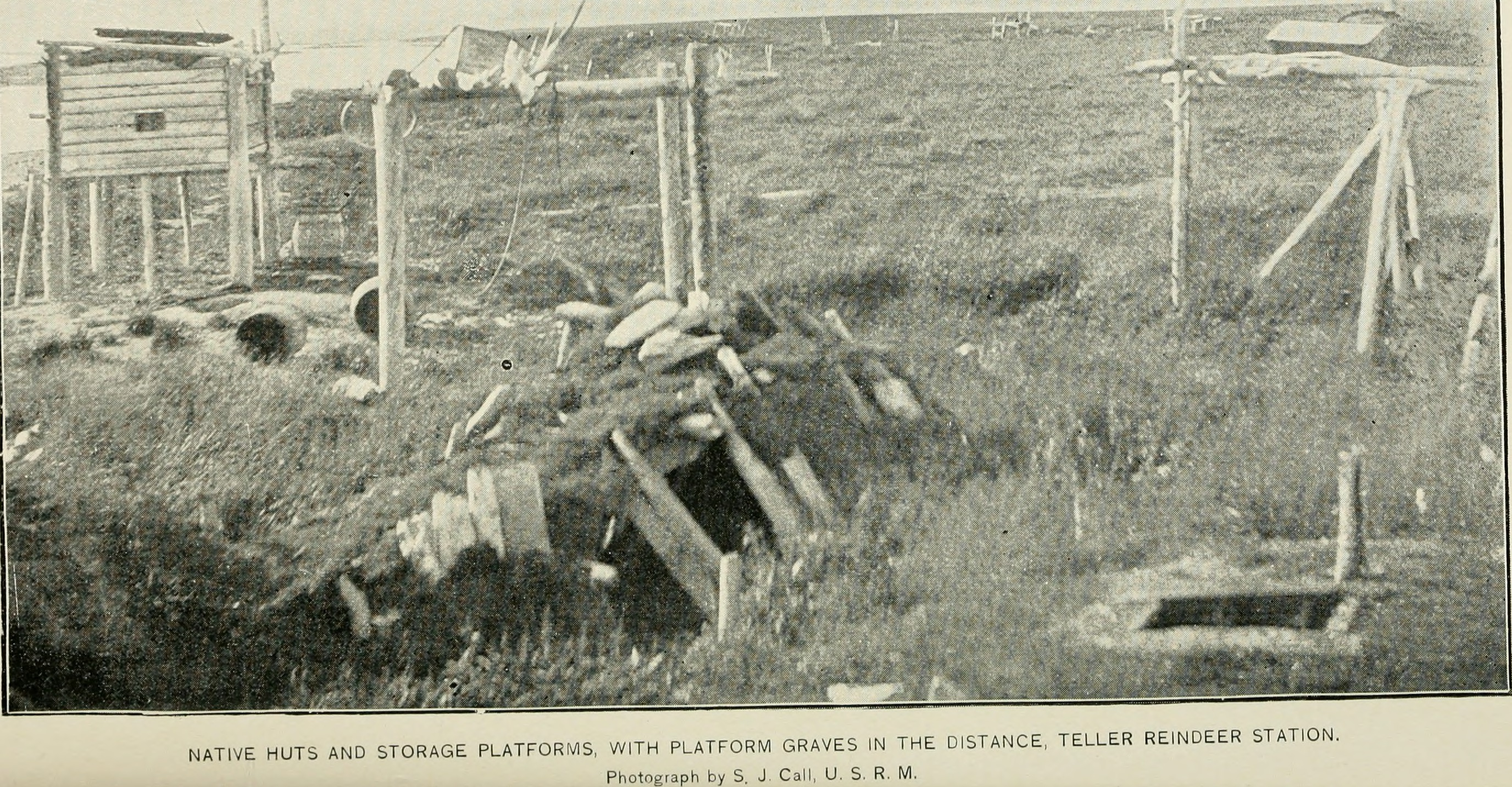
Native huts and storage platforms, with platform graves in the distance, Teller reindeer station (1894)

Brevig Mission first appeared on the 1950 U.S. census and in 1960 as the unincorporated village of "Teller Mission." In 1969, it was formally incorporated under its present name of Brevig Mission.

=== 2020 census ===
As of the 2020 census, Brevig Mission had a population of 428. The median age was 27.0 years. 36.2% of residents were under the age of 18 and 6.8% of residents were 65 years of age or older. For every 100 females there were 105.8 males, and for every 100 females age 18 and over there were 103.7 males age 18 and over.

0.0% of residents lived in urban areas, while 100.0% lived in rural areas.

There were 111 households in Brevig Mission, of which 51.4% had children under the age of 18 living in them. Of all households, 22.5% were married-couple households, 25.2% were households with a male householder and no spouse or partner present, and 29.7% were households with a female householder and no spouse or partner present. About 20.7% of all households were made up of individuals and 1.8% had someone living alone who was 65 years of age or older.

There were 116 housing units, of which 4.3% were vacant. The homeowner vacancy rate was 1.1% and the rental vacancy rate was 0.0%.

Racial composition as of the 2020 census
Race	Number	Percent
White	24	5.6%
Black or African American	3	0.7%
American Indian and Alaska Native	380	88.8%
Asian	3	0.7%
Native Hawaiian and Other Pacific Islander	0	0.0%
Some other race	4	0.9%
Two or more races	14	3.3%
Hispanic or Latino (of any race)	5	1.2%

=== 2000 census ===
As of the census of 2000, there were 276 people, 68 households, and 53 families residing in the city. The population density was 106.3 inhabitants per square mile (41.0/km^{2}). There were 76 housing units at an average density of 29.3 per square mile (11.3/km^{2}). The racial makeup of the city was 8.0% White, 90.6% Native American, and 1.5% from two or more races. Hispanic or Latino of any race were 0.7% of the population.

Of the 68 households, 52.9% had children under the age of 18 living with them, 30.9% were married couples living together, 25.0% had a female householder with no husband present, and 20.6% were non-families. 14.7% of all households were made up of individuals, and none had someone living alone who was 65 years of age or older. The average household size was 4.06 and the average family size was 4.35.

In the city, the age distribution of the population shows 45.3% under the age of 18, 12.3% from 18 to 24, 28.6% from 25 to 44, 10.1% from 45 to 64, and 3.6% who were 65 years of age or older. The median age was 20 years. For every 100 females, there were 101.5 males. For every 100 females age 18 and over, there were 118.8 males.

The median income for a household in the city was $21,875, and the median income for a family was $16,786. Males had a median income of $11,250 versus $25,000 for females. The per capita income for the city was $7,278. About 43.3% of families and 48.4% of the population were below the poverty line, including 50.8% of those under age 18 and none of those age 65 or over.

== Education ==
Brevig Mission is served by the Bering Strait School District. Brevig Mission School serves grades Pre-K through 12.

== 1918 Spanish Flu ==
The pandemic caused by the 1918 influenza outbreak was by far the most devastating single disease outbreak in modern history, killing at least 50 million people during an 18-month period. In Brevig Mission alone, it killed 72 out of 80 residents in a 5-day period. The 72 victims were buried in the frozen ground in a mass grave dug for them by gold miners and marked by white crosses. As happened elsewhere in the Americas after the arrival of Columbus, Indigenous Alaska Natives had no genetic resistance to any flu, so it decimated many villages.

In 1997, a team of scientists led by Johan Hultin exhumed the frozen remains of an Iñupiat woman who had been buried in the permafrost in a gravesite near Brevig Mission in a successful attempt to recover RNA from her lung tissue. It enabled them to analyze the structure of the 1918 influenza virus (Spanish flu), which may have originated in Fort Riley, Kansas, that killed her.

== Health ==
Sale, importation and possession of alcohol are banned in the village.
