= Ian Wilson (biologist) =

Scottish biologist

Ian Andrew Wilson
- Born: Perth, Scotland
- Education: University of Edinburgh, Oxford University
- Known for: Structural biology
- Scientific career
- Workplaces: Scripps Research Institute
- Doctoral advisor: David Chilton Phillips
- Other academic advisors: Don Craig Wiley

Ian Andrew Wilson is the Hansen Professor of Structural Biology and chair of the Department of Integrative Structural and Computational Biology at the Scripps Research Institute in San Diego, California, United States.

== Education ==
He received his BSc in biochemistry from the University of Edinburgh in 1971, his PhD degree in molecular biophysics from Oxford University in 1976 under the guidance of David Chilton Phillips working on the structure of the triosephosphate isomerase. He then did postdoctoral research at Harvard University with Don Craig Wiley from 1977 to 1982 during which he solved the first crystal structure of the influenza virus hemagglutinin.

== Career and research ==
After his postdoc positions, he joined the Scripps Research Institute in La Jolla, California, in 1982 as an assistant professor and is currently professor in the department of molecular biology and the Skaggs Institute for Chemical Biology. His laboratory focuses on the recognition of microbial pathogens by the immune system and has determined over 85 crystal structures of mouse, human, shark, and catalytic antibodies, with a variety of antigens, including steroids, peptides, carbohydrates and viral proteins, such as HIV-1 and Hepatitis C virus envelope glycoproteins. His team was reported by the 6 February 2004 edition of Science magazine to have managed to synthesise the hemagglutinin protein responsible for the 1918 outbreak of Spanish flu.

Since 2000, he has directed the Joint Center for Structural Genomics (JCSG) that has pioneered innovative new methods for high throughput structural studies, including x-ray and NMR. The JCSG has determined over 700 structures that focus on the expanding protein universe.

== Awards and honours ==
He was elected as a Fellow of the Royal Society of London in 2000, a Member of the American Academy of Arts and Sciences in 2002, a Fellow of the Royal Society of Edinburgh in 2008, a foreign associate of the National Academy of Sciences in 2016. He also served on the Life Sciences jury for the Infosys Prize in 2014.

== Personal life ==
Ian was born in Perth, Scotland. His father was a journalist.
