= Armed Forces Institute of Pathology =

US government medical diagnostic institute

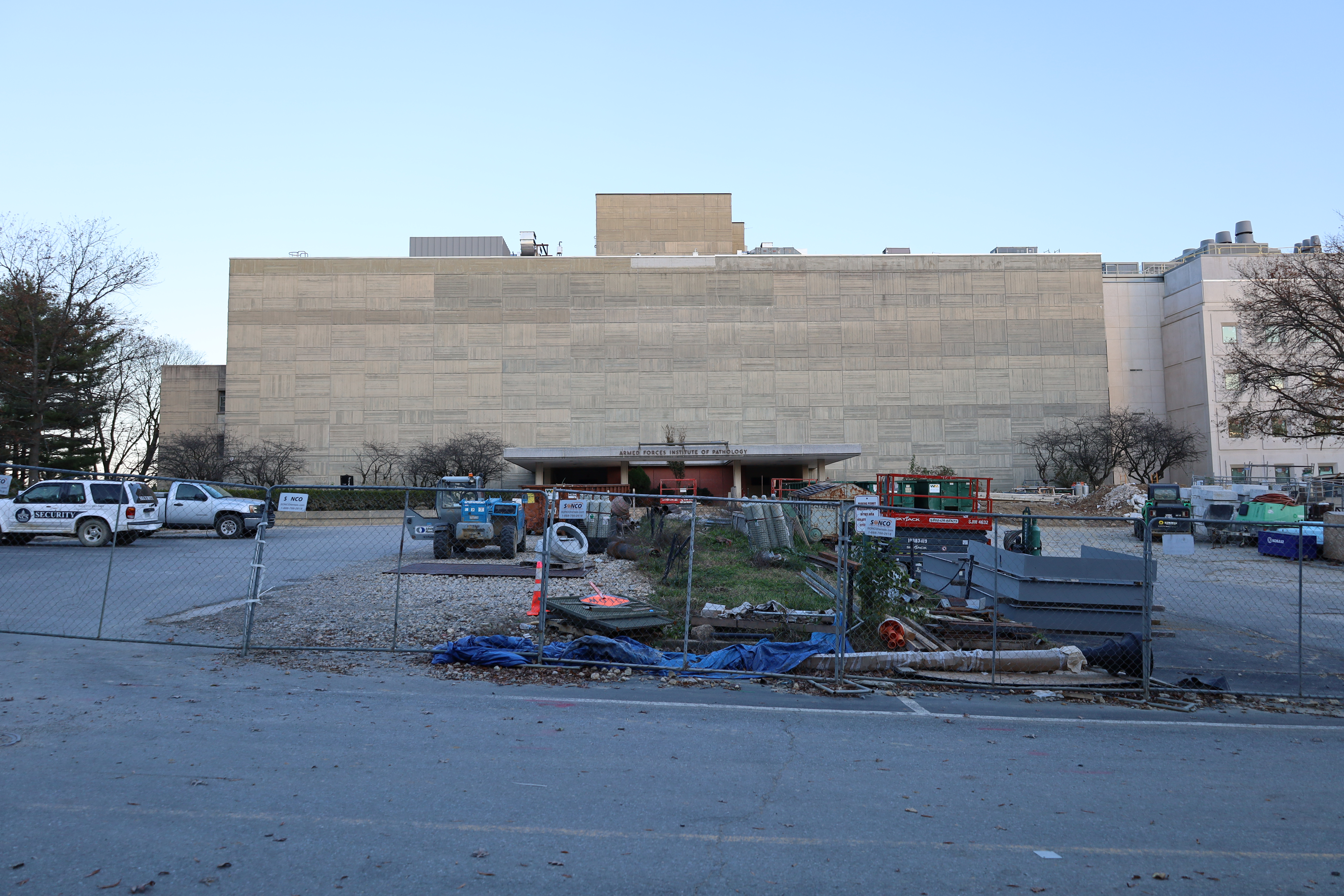
Armed Forces Institute of Pathology building at the Walter Reed Army Medical Center, being renovated in 2020

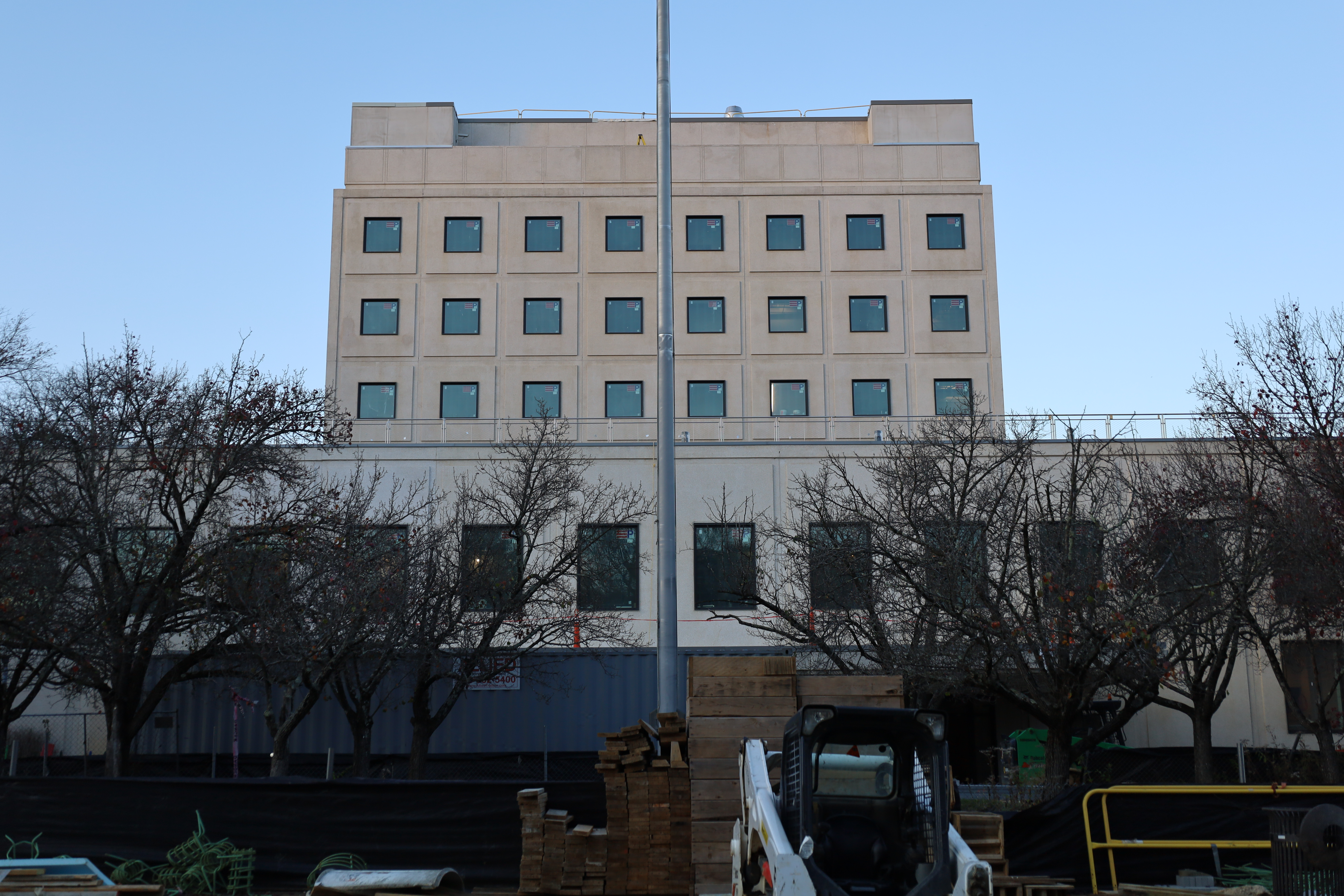
Southern wing of the building in 2020

The Armed Forces Institute of Pathology (AFIP) (1862 – September 15, 2011) was a U.S. government institution concerned with diagnostic consultation, education, and research in the medical specialty of pathology.

== Overview ==
It was founded in 1862 as the Army Medical Museum in Washington, D.C., on the grounds of the Walter Reed Army Medical Center (WRAMC). It primarily provided second opinion diagnostic consultations on pathologic specimens such as biopsies from military, veteran, and civilian medical, dental, and veterinary sources. The unique character of the AFIP rested in the expertise of its civilian and military staff of diagnostic pathologists whose daily work consisted of the study of cases that are difficult to diagnose owing to their rarity or their variation from the ordinary. The accumulation of such cases has resulted in a rich repository of lesions, numbering over three million, that have been the basis of major pathological studies.

Examples are the published reports on the clinical, pathological, and molecular characteristics of the relatively newly recognized gastrointestinal stromal tumors.

Another special feature of the AFIP was the interaction between its departments in analyzing complex cases. The AFIP's diagnostic departments were based on organ sites—e.g., dermatological, hepatic, gastrointestinal, genitourinary, pulmonary, soft tissue, bone, hematological, neurological, endocrine, and gynecological pathology. In addition, there were specialty departments dealing with infectious and parasitic diseases, molecular studies and environmental pathology. As all of these specialties were located in one institution, rapid collaborative examination of a case was facilitated and interdepartmental collaborative research was the rule rather than the exception. In 2009, the Environmental Protection Agency shut down many of the labs, especially those dealing with anthrax, due to improper storage practices.

Unique to the AFIP was the Department of Radiologic Pathology, which pursued the interface between diagnostic radiology and anatomic pathology. This department was responsible for a course staffed and attended by most of the US trained radiologists during their residency. A by-product was a repository of medical cases having extensive radiological images and pathological slides, a great source for studies in this field.

The educational mission of the Institute consisted of formal courses providing continuing medical education (CME) credits for postgraduate medical personnel. A number of these courses had microscope slide study sets for individual examination by the participants as well as authoritative lectures by the AFIP and visiting staff. Fellowships were available as were one-month visits to individual departments.

Building 54, the building occupied by AFIP on the Walter Reed Campus, is unique in that it was designed to be atomic bombproof in 1951. It has no windows and walls are said to be 8-ft thick.

== AFIP and international standardization ==
The AFIP played a critical role in the standardization of pathologic diagnosis of tumors. This was mainly the result of the participation of AFIP staff as panel members and reference center heads in the International Histological Classification of Tumors (IHCT) series of the World Health Organization (WHO). WHO reference and collaborating centers were established at the AFIP in a number of subjects aimed at international standardization of tumor nomenclature, classification, and diagnostic criteria. AFIP staff contributed the largest number of IHCT panel members than any other institution. AFIP staff played key roles in the Tumor Node Metastasis (TNM) project of the Union for International Cancer Control (UICC). The AFIP Atlases of Tumor Pathology, published by the American Registry of Pathology were, and still are, monumental contributions to standards in diagnosis throughout the world.

== Disestablishment ==
The Base Realignment and Closure proposal for 2005 included a realignment of the Walter Reed Army Medical Center campus that had as one element the disestablishment of AFIP with relocation of its "military relevant functions" to the National Naval Medical Center (NNMC), Bethesda, Maryland; Dover AFB, Delaware; and Fort Sam Houston, Texas.

The implications of the BRAC and reaction to it by the pathology world resulted in congressional legislation in the National Defense Authorization Act of 2008 (NDAA 2008)[section 722] establishing a Joint Pathology Center (JPC). This recognized the significant contributions of the AFIP and mandated the JPC to assume many of AFIP's responsibilities in consultation, education, and research, as well as the modernization of its unique tissue repository. AFIP shut its doors on September 15, 2011.

== Continuation as American Institute of Radiologic Pathology ==
Recognizing the educational value of the radiology-pathology correlation course and corresponding vast database of cases, the American College of Radiology has been instrumental in creating the American Institute of Radiologic Pathology (AIRP) to allow continuation of the radiology-pathology course. The first course of the AIRP began in January 2011.

== Building status and future ==
Following the WRAMC's closure in 2011, the AFIP building and other space totaling 12 acres was given to Children's National Hospital to establish its Research & Innovation Campus. When completed, the campus will host a wide variety of medical research, as well as biomedical incubator space and a primary care clinic.

Renovation work started in 2018 and the first phase of the project opened in 2021.
