= Balto =

Siberian Husky and sled dog (1919–1933)

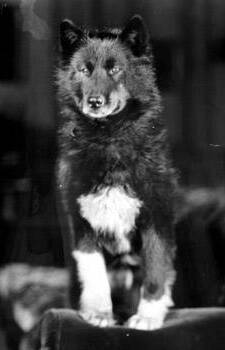
- Balto, c. 1925.
- Species: Canis lupus familiaris
- Breed: Siberian Husky
- Sex: Male
- Born: c. 1919; Nome, Territory of Alaska
- Died: March 14, 1933 (aged 13–14); Cleveland, Ohio, United States
- Resting place: Cleveland Museum of Natural History; 41°30′42.22″N 81°36′47.57″W
- Nationality: United States of America (Territory of Alaska)
- Occupation: Sled dog
- Known for: 1925 serum run to Nome
- Owner: Gunnar Kaasen
- Appearance: Black with white "socks", "bib", and partial white markings on belly and tip of the muzzle, which advanced with age (including white markings around the eyes when he was old). Eyes were dark brown.
- Named after: Samuel Balto

Balto (c. 1919 – March 14, 1933) was a Siberian Husky and sled dog belonging to musher and breeder Leonhard Seppala. He achieved fame when he was part of a team of sled dogs driven by Gunnar Kaasen on the final leg of the 1925 serum run to Nome, in which diphtheria antitoxin was transported from Anchorage, Alaska, to Nenana, Alaska, by train and then to Nome by dog sled to combat an outbreak of the disease. Credited as the leader of the team, Balto's celebrity status, and that of Kaasen's, resulted in a two-reel motion picture, a statue in Central Park, and a nationwide tour on the vaudeville circuit.

A falling out between Seppala and Kaasen resulted in Balto and his teammates being sold under disputed circumstances to a traveling circus operator and ultimately housed in squalor at a dime museum in Los Angeles. When news stories emerged in February 1927 about his poor living conditions, a two-week fundraising effort in Cleveland, Ohio, led to the successful purchase of Balto and his team by the citizenry of Cleveland. Balto lived in ease at the Cleveland Zoo until his death on March 14, 1933, at the age of 14; his body was subsequently mounted and displayed in the Cleveland Museum of Natural History, where it remains to this day. While the subject of numerous cultural depictions and homages, including a 1995 animated film, Balto's role in the serum run remains controversial as contemporary media coverage focused almost entirely on him over the efforts of the other mushers and dogs—most notably, Seppala and his lead dog Togo—and has more recently undergone historical reappraisals.

== Life ==
=== Early years ===
Little is known about Balto's early years. Balto's birth year is commonly recognized as 1919, in Nome, Alaska, at the kennels of Leonhard Seppala, a native Norwegian, sled dog breeder, musher and competitive racer. He was named after Samuel Balto, a Sámi who was part of Fridtjof Nansen's exploration of Greenland in 1888, and whom Seppala admired. (Note: Samuel's name has also been rendered as "Lapp Baltow" or "Lapp Balton".) No birth records were kept for Balto or his litter as his body type did not align with other racing huskies that Seppala was breeding. The only evidence of Balto's birth year came from later interviews with Seppala. With a largely black fur coat, Balto had a small, stocky build, unique for a Siberian husky.

Believing Balto to be "second rate" and not holding much potential, Seppala neutered him at six months of age. He considered him a "scrub dog", unable to run as fast as his other dogs, who were derisively called "Siberian rats" by mushers against whom Seppala competed. Seppala claimed in his memoir to have "given [Balto] every chance" to ride with his primary sled dog team "but could not qualify"; thus, Balto was relegated to haul freight and large cargo for short runs and was part of a team that pulled railcars with miners over a disused railroad. Gunnar Kaasen, (Note: Also spelled as "Kasson".) another native Norwegian and a close family friend of Seppala with 21 years' dog sledding experience, came to know Balto through his work at Seppala's mining company. Kaasen believed Seppala misjudged Balto's potential and that the dog's short stature could allow him to be more strong and steady.

=== The serum run ===
In January 1925, doctors realized that a potentially deadly diphtheria epidemic was poised to sweep through the young people of Nome, Alaska, placing the city under quarantine. Dr. Curtis Welch, the primary physician in Nome, transmitted via Morse code that the town's existing serum, which was over six years old, was being depleted. Additional serum was made available in Anchorage, but the territory's only two usable aircraft had open cockpits and were thus grounded for the winter. After considering all the alternatives, officials decided to have the serum ferried via multiple dog sled teams over the "Seward-to-Nome Trail". The serum was transported by train from Anchorage to Nenana, where the first musher embarked as part of a 674-mile (1,085 km) relay. More than 20 mushers took part, facing a blizzard with −23 °F (−31 °C) temperatures and strong winds. Originally projected to arrive in Nome by February 6, the date was moved up several times as the teams repeatedly broke land speed records. News coverage of the event, in particular the hazards posed to the dogs and the leaders, was relayed worldwide; newspaper headlines read; "Relief Nears Nome!", "Dog Teams in Race with Death in Far North" and "Seppalla ... May Save Diphtheria Victims".

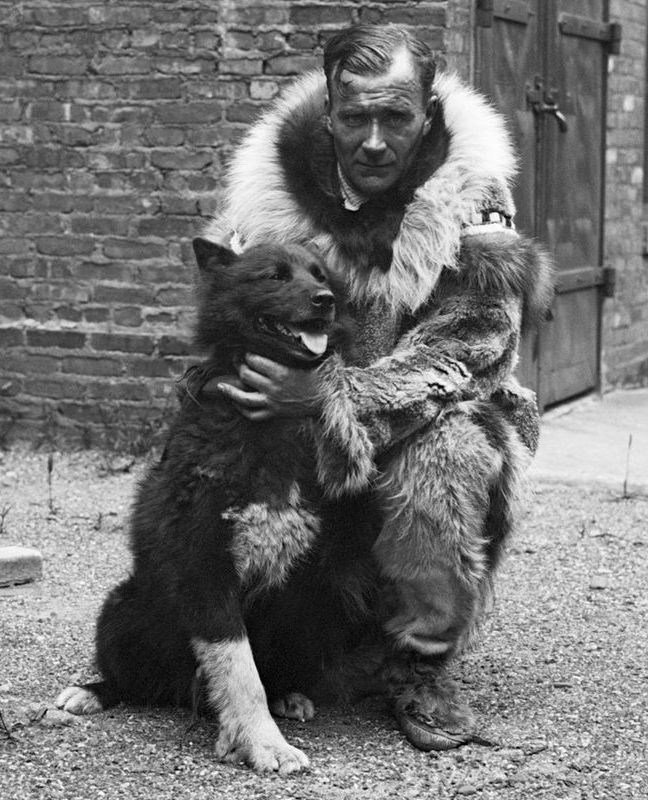
Gunnar Kaasen with Balto, c. February 1925

As the serum run progressed, additional teams were recruited as Alaskan governor Scott Cordelle Bone worried about Seppala's team experiencing fatigue. Kaasen was appointed to drive a team of Seppala's dogs originally set aside for company business during the run, with Fox chosen by Seppala as the leader. Kaasen, however, chose Balto to co-lead alongside Fox, (Note: Other records claim Kaasen chose Balto "unhesitatingly" to lead his team, even allowing Balto to room with him in the roadhouse in Bluff while the rest of the team, including Fox, were safely lodged in the roadhouse kennel.) a move Seppala later disagreed with as he felt Balto was not worthy to be a lead dog. Balto had been largely untried as a sled dog prior to the run, but Kaasen expressed confidence in Balto's abilities and likely identified with him. The serum package was handed to Kaasen by Charlie Olson in Bluff at 10:00 p.m. on February 1. The blizzard quickly began to bear down on the team, causing them to become lost and confused. This prompted Kaasen to move Balto to the lead, yelling at him, "Go home, Balto." Balto's ability to pull heavy freight allowed him to steadily navigate the team through the storm; at one point, Balto stopped in front of a patch of ice on the Topkok River that broke underneath him, saving Kaasen's life along with the entire team. Kaasen suffered frostbite after his sled flipped and the serum package fell into the snow, forcing him to search bare-handed for it.

Newsreel footage from Gaumont of Gunnar Kaasen and Balto's team arriving in Nome; this was a staged recreation filmed later in the day.

Kaasen and his team arrived in Point Safety ahead of schedule, but found the last team of the run was not ready and the roadhouse they lodged in was dark. Ed Rohn, the leader of this final team, was asleep at the time under the impression Kaasen had been halted in nearby Solomon, a settlement Kaasen rode past without visibly recognizing due to the poor weather. Kaasen decided not to wake him up and continue on, knowing it would take time for Rohn to prepare and risk putting additional dogs in harm's way. Despite suffering from exposure and exhaustion, Kaasen and Balto traveled the remaining 25 miles (40 km) to Nome, and arrived at Front Street on February 2, 1925, at 5:30 a.m. (Note: Discrepancies exist in the exact length of the run of Kaasen's team; it has ranged from 50, 53 or 55 miles and as many as 60 miles.) While frozen solid, all 300,000 units of the antitoxin were intact, and Kaasen handed them over to be thawed for use by midday. Four of Kaasen's dogs were partially frozen when they arrived; one newspaper dispatch erroneously stated Balto and the majority of the team died several days later from frozen lungs, and was immediately retracted shortly after publication. Seppala reached Nome two days later and praised Kaasen for having continued on through blizzard conditions.

Kaasen gave all credit to Balto, telling a United Press reporter, "I gave Balto, my lead dog, his head and trusted to him. He never once faltered ... [i]t was Balto who led the way, the credit is his." After reaching Dr. Welch's office to deliver the serum, Kaasen tended to Balto, hugging him and purportedly repeating, "Damn fine dog ... damn fine dog." On the U.S. Senate chamber floor several days later, Washington Senator Clarence Dill recognized the efforts of everyone who helped with the serum run but cited Balto in particular, saying, "[t]his black Siberian dog, through the darkness and storm, crossed this icy desert and kept the trail when no human being could possibly have found the way." The H. K. Mulford Company, one of the manufacturers of the serum units, awarded Kaasen a $1,000 prize (equivalent to $18,359 in 2025) alongside inscribed medals which were given to all the mushers.

=== Post-race fame: movies, statues, vaudeville and sale to a sideshow ===
Newspapers were heralding the feats achieved during the serum run almost exclusively to Balto, eclipsing the efforts of the 18 other mushers and 150 sled dogs who participated. The death toll in Nome was seven people—not counting Alaskan Natives who were not recorded—adding further to the media sensation as the diphtheria epidemic was seemingly averted. When the New York Daily News published exclusive photos of Kaasen's arrival in Nome, Balto was pictured directly in the foreground of the entire team; these photos were later revealed to be staged recreations hours after Kaasen arrived. The recent adoption of radio in the contiguous United States also meant dispatches from Nome had been relayed to radio stations throughout the country. As 1925 ended, Balto was credited in news coverage as having accomplished the entire serum run by himself, a misconception that persisted long after his death.

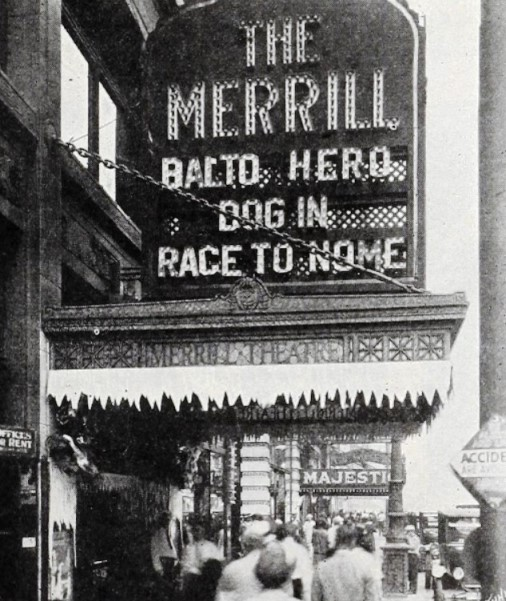
The Merrill Theatre in Milwaukee, Wisconsin, showing the American documentary film Balto's Race to Nome (1925)

Film producer Sol Lesser promptly signed Kaasen, Balto and the team of "thirteen half wolves" to a contract with Educational Pictures for a movie based on the serum run. Film production began in April 1925 in Los Angeles. Upon arriving in the city, Balto was the recipient of the "bone of the city" by the mayor of Los Angeles, along with other dignitaries including actress Mary Pickford. The two-reel movie, Balto's Race to Nome, debuted the following month to positive reviews; it is now considered a lost film. Shortly after the film's release, Kaasen sued Lesser for unpaid wages; Lesser then sold the existing contract to the vaudeville circuit. Kaasen and Balto soon traveled across the country, making public appearances and being bestowed gifts from the cities visited. In one instance, while visiting Cleveland, Ohio, Kaasen was awarded a subscription to The Plain Dealer as a gift from an existing subscriber, to be delivered to his home in Nome.

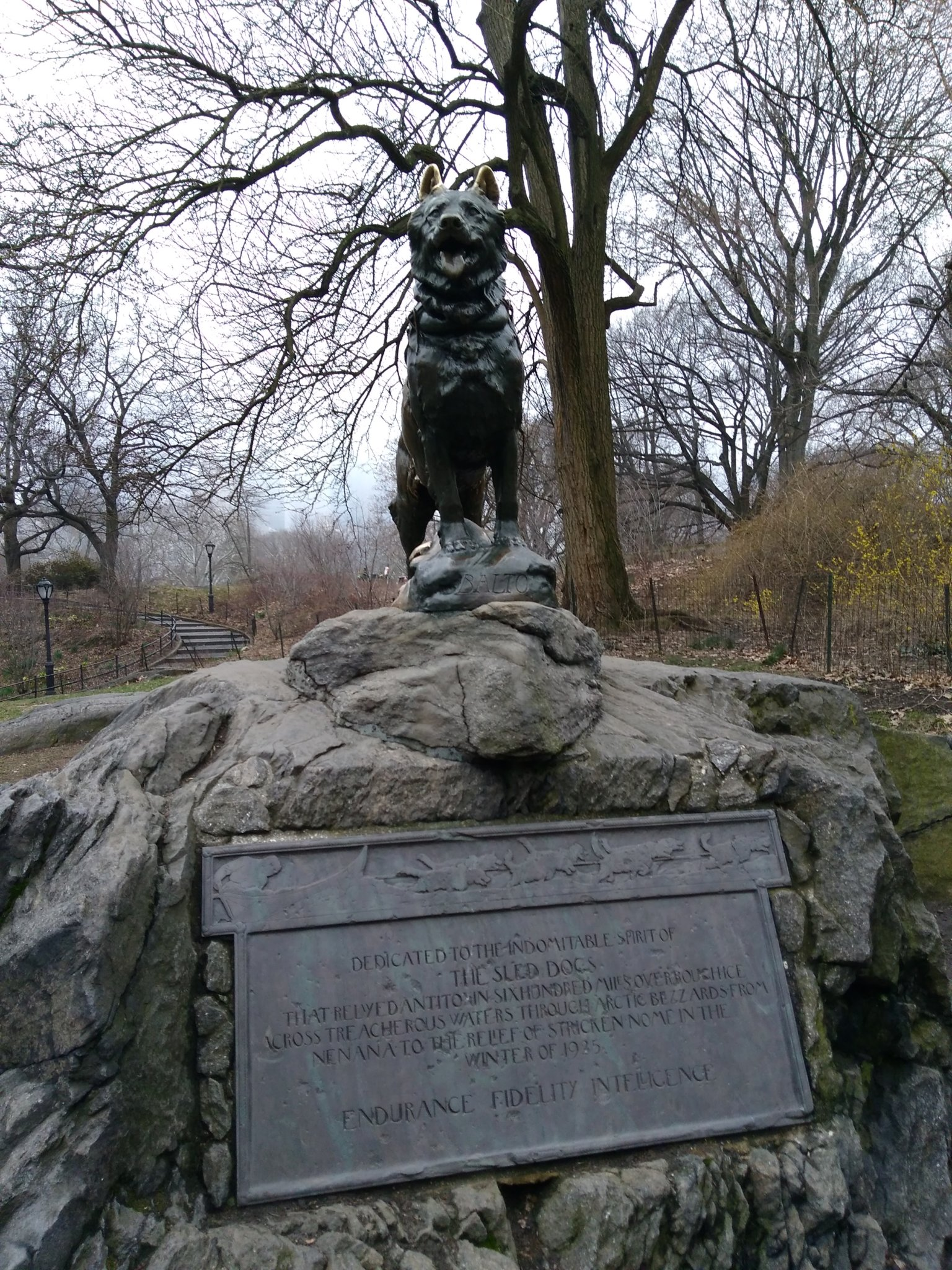
Statue of Balto in Central Park, New York City

A statue of Balto, sculpted by Frederick Roth, was erected in New York City's Central Park on December 17, 1925, ten months after Balto's arrival in Nome. Balto modeled in front of Roth and was present for the monument's unveiling. The statue is located on the main path leading north from the Tisch Children's Zoo. In front of the statue, a low-relief slate plaque depicts Balto's sled team and bears the inscription, "[d]edicated to the indomitable spirit of the sled dogs that relayed antitoxin six hundred miles over rough ice, across treacherous waters, through Arctic blizzards from Nenana to the relief of stricken Nome in the winter of 1925: endurance, fidelity, intelligence".

Seppala had been "amazed and vastly amused" at Balto and Kaasen's celebrity statuses, but was displeased as it overlooked his lead dog Togo, who went through the run's longest and most dangerous part. Seppala made a similar cross-country tour with Togo and his teammates in 1926, including a gala ice-rink appearance at Madison Square Garden, believing that Togo had been deprived of fame and acclaim. Before relocating to Poland Spring, Maine, in March 1927, Seppala claimed Fox was the actual leader of Kaasen's team and failed to get any proper credit due to Fox's name being more common and would not stand out in newspaper headlines like Balto. A February 1932 interview Seppala had with Henry McLemore furthered this, claiming a newspaper reporter simply chose Balto as "the lead dog ... that brought the serum in" after multiple names were offered by Seppala; as he was still riding to Nome with Togo at the time, this is likely anachronistic. The "Vaccine Research Association" unsuccessfully called for the Central Park statue's removal in 1931, citing a 1929 interview where Seppala claimed all the dramatic events surrounding the run were fabricated to sell newspapers. Unwilling to show disrespect to a sled dog, Seppala partly backtracked from these claims in his memoir:

I hope I shall never be the man to take away credit from any dog or driver who participated in that run. We all did our best. But when the country was roused to enthusiasm over the serum run driver, I resented the statue to Balto, for if any dog deserved special mention it was Togo ... At the time I left [for the run] I never dreamed that anyone could consider these dogs [the second string] fit to drive even in a short relay. ... As to the leader, it was up to the driver who happened to be selected to choose any dog he liked, and he chose Balto.

After the dispute with Lesser was resolved, Balto and his teammates were sold to Sam Houston, owner of a traveling circus. The exact circumstances for the sale are unclear: some accounts, including Houston himself, claimed Kaasen sold the dogs after tiring of the constant traveling and moved back to Alaska. Other accounts claimed Seppala made the deal with Houston and ordered Kaasen—who was still under his employ at the Pioneer Mining Company—back to Alaska. Seppala claimed in his memoir that he sold the dogs to Lesser, with Balto selling for much more "on account of the publicity given to his 'glorious achievements'". Kaasen and Seppala never spoke to each other again. Kaasen's departure occurred after the Central Park statue unveiling; upon returning to Nome one year after the run, he found himself alienated by residents of Nome over his fame, with some expressing resentment over the bypassing of Ed Rohn. By May 1947, Seppala dismissed the serum run as little more than "just an ordinary hard run" and Balto's fame as "a product of modern publicity rather than of outstanding merit ... Balto was just a good average dog".

=== Cleveland fundraising effort and purchase ===
Balto and his team continued on tour throughout much of 1926 under the ownership of Sam Houston in both his circus and theatre circuits. By February 1927, stories emerged of Balto and six teammates living in the back room of a "for men only" dime museum in Los Angeles, also described as a freak show. After leaving the vaudeville circuit, Balto and his team briefly resided at a farm, only to be taken back to the city after misbehaving and entering a chicken coop. Balto and his teammates were displayed chained to a sled, with their only exercise consisting of brief trips in the museum's back alley. They were malnourished, with their ribs showing. Jack Wooldridge of the Oakland Tribune wrote about the mistreatment, "[t]here probably was never a more dejected, sorrowful looking lot of malamutes than these as they now appear. Balto will never see the snow again. He's simply an exhibit in a museum."

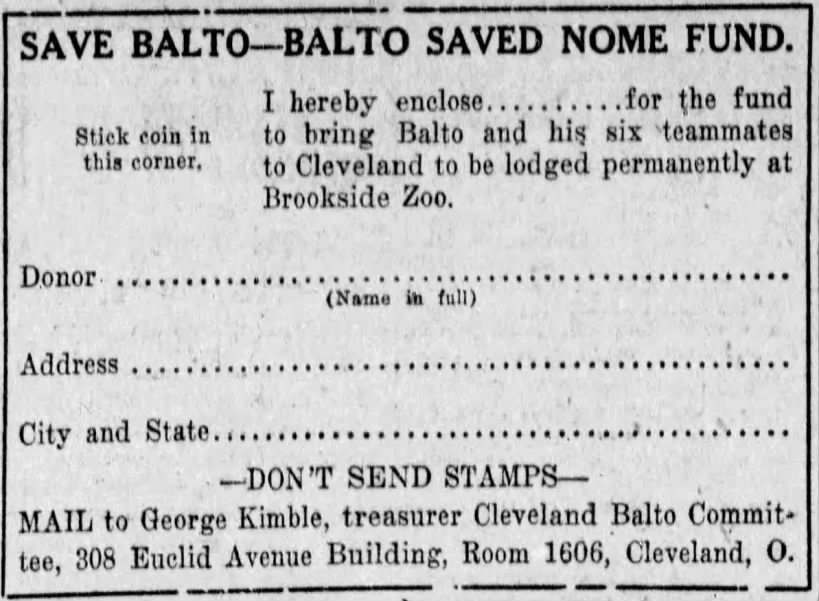
A fundraising appeal for the Cleveland Balto Committee, printed in The Plain Dealer on March 2, 1927

Cleveland businessman George Kimble visited the dime museum while in Los Angeles after noticing a sign outside advertising "Balto the wonder dog". (Note: It is unknown if Kimble discovered the dogs after being prompted by the newspaper reports; Kimble's name does not emerge until March 2, 1927, when the "Cleveland Balto Committee" was announced, one week after he learned they were in the dime museum. The majority of contemporary accounts, in addition to the Cleveland Museum of Natural History, recognize Kimble as having discovered Balto.) Outraged at seeing Balto and his teammates in poor health, Kimble offered to buy the dogs from Sam Houston, who was willing to sell, but demanded $2,000 (equivalent to $37,069 in 2025), more than Kimble could personally afford. Kimble reached out to area businessmen and elected officials, along with The Plain Dealer, and assembled the Cleveland Balto Committee led by Common Pleas Judge James B. Ruhl, which negotiated with Houston. After Houston agreed to sell the dogs for $1,500, a fund raising campaign was formally announced in the March 1, 1927, Plain Dealer, and the Brookside Zoo promised to create lodging for the dogs. Raising $200 on the campaign's first day, a ten-day option was obtained, and the dogs were temporarily relocated to a ranch as a foster home. The Plain Dealer carried daily tallies of donations to the campaign. (Note: As seen here:) Donations came from all over the city, with Cleveland schoolchildren dropping loose change in buckets and offering their milk money; along with children, bank employees, offices and nonprofit institutions all making donations. Within four days, the committee grew from seven members to seventeen. Area kennel clubs, shops and hotels also made contributions.

Appeals to donate were broadcast over radio stations WDBK, WHK and WTAM, along with stations in Detroit and elsewhere; one response came from Japan after a listener there heard an appeal over WJZ in New York by long-distance reception. Three models for the William Taylor & Son department store were driven around downtown Cleveland promoting the campaign. The Los Angeles Alaskan Society subsequently offered to buy the team if the $2,000 could not be raised in time by the Cleveland effort, as the ten-day option had been publicized in the Los Angeles Daily Times. By the evening of March 8, $1,517 had been raised, prompting one last-minute appeal by the Plain Dealer; the following morning, the fund surpassed the $2,000 goal, totaling $2,245.88 (equivalent to $41,626 in 2025) and securing the purchase of the entire seven-dog team. The effort won the praise of Roald Amundsen, who compared it to the city of Oslo adopting the lone surviving dog from his expedition to the South Pole. A Plain Dealer editorial on the campaign's success read, "[t]he city which honors a worthy dumb animal honors itself. Cleveland looks forward to welcoming its Alaskan guests a few days hence and hopes their life here may be long and pleasant."

Balto and his team were paraded through Public Square in Cleveland on March 19, 1927, and presented to the city at the steps of City Hall.

Balto and his six teammates—Alaska Slim, Fox, Tillie, Billie, Old Moctoc and Sye (Note: Also spelled as "Cy" or "Si".)—were transported by train from Los Angeles to Cleveland along with identification papers; arriving March 16, the dogs were escorted to temporary quarters at Brookside Zoo. A grand parade took place at the Public Square on March 19, 1927, which the city designated as "Balto Day". Despite rainy conditions, thousands of people were present (Note: One retrospective story had an estimate of 15,000 attendees for the parade; this might be accidentally confused with the 15,000 attendees that saw Balto in his first day at the zoo.) as the team pulled a sled modified with iron wheels making it navigable on cobblestone streets and streetcar tracks; two local Boy Scout troops carried signs announcing Balto's arrival and a map of the serum run, while five local people were "sourdough" (Note: 'Sourdough' is another name for a prospector or minor during the Klondike gold rush of Yukon, in north-western Canada, between 1896 and 1899.) escorts. In the rotunda of Cleveland City Hall, Judge Ruhl read a deed of gift that transferred ownership of Balto and his team to the city "forever". After the parade, the dogs were all transported to a more permanent housing at the zoo.

=== Later years ===
Balto and his teammates made their formal debut at the Brookside Zoo on March 20, 1927, with estimates of up to 15,000 people visiting the zoo that day. Even with his permanent residence at the zoo, Balto occasionally made public appearances, including at an exhibition hosted by the Western Reserve Kennel Club in which Balto won "best of show" honors. Balto also made an appearance at a parade for the 1929 National Air Races.

Owing to the Brookside Zoo's location in a valley, the team would pull sleds during winter weather conditions; one snowfall in early January 1928, turned the zoo's boulevard into an icy trail, with Balto and Fox alternating lead. The Plain Dealer occasionally anthropomorphized their depictions of Balto at the zoo, including an encounter with a visiting husky and his owner from Manitoba. Another 1929 story centered around his "daydreaming" of Richard E. Byrd's expedition of Antarctica; this resulted in multiple letters to the editor that criticized the enclosure and were concerned about the welfare of the dogs. One letter expressed regret for contributing to "Balto to Cleveland" fund as "one of the most inhuman acts we could have performed". One letter written decades later recalled visiting the zoo on a hot day, with Balto tied to a tree in front of a water pan "with a few drops of water in it". Even with these criticisms, the conditions at the zoo were generally seen as "excellent". Zoo staff frequently sprayed the dogs to discourage fleas, their steam-heated kennel had a purpose-built shower for nightly cleaning, and the dogs had a respectable diet of meat in the morning, nightly dog biscuits and plentiful access to water. Zoo superintendent John Kramer defended their treatment of the dogs, particularly with Fox, saying "people don't understand why we do certain things here... you can't please them all."

Another enclosure meant for the summer months was built for the dogs in 1930. This enclosure included a bronze tablet on top of a granite monument located in front of Balto's cage. Bearing the names of the entire seven-dog team, the monument was intended as a shrine for all animal lovers of Greater Cleveland. The dogs lived out the remainders of their lives at the zoo: Billie was the first to die, followed by Fox. Between 1930 and 1933, Alaska Slim, Tillie and Old Moctoc all died, with Balto and Sye the only members in the team remaining.

=== Death, mounting and display ===
Balto died on March 14, 1933, at the age of 14. News of Balto's declining health was published four days earlier, having lost his sight and suffering decreased mobility and paralysis. Because of his advanced age, the city's veterinarian and zoo personnel estimated he would not be able to survive the week. Balto's death was attributed to both an enlarged heart and bladder, the former as a result of stress incurred from the serum run. The following day, the Cleveland Museum of Natural History (CMNH) agreed to display Balto in taxidermy form. Balto's mounting cost $50 (equivalent to $1,244 in 2025) and was again raised through a fund-raising campaign; the process included the placement of Balto's skin and fur over a lifelike form as an effigy, a process that was finished by that May. Balto's thyroid and adrenal glands were preserved at the Cleveland Clinic in George Washington Crile's organ collection.

Sye, the last of the seven dogs, was reportedly crestfallen over Balto's death, moaning, howling, and refusing to eat. Sye died on March 25, 1934, one year after Balto, and was the only dog of the group to sire offspring. As was the case with Balto, Sye's remains were mounted for display by the zoo, initially displayed over the zoo's tiger enclosure. By 1965, neither the zoo or CMNH could locate the remains of Sye, which are now presumed lost. Sye, Balto and Togo were the only three dogs that participated in the serum run to have had their remains mounted. The monument that was erected at the zoo for the dogs, retroactively regarded as a gravestone, was taken out of public display after Balto died. As other zoo buildings were subsequently erected on the site of the former enclosure for Balto's team, the exact site of the graves for Billie, Fox, Moctoc, Slim and Tillie are now unknown.

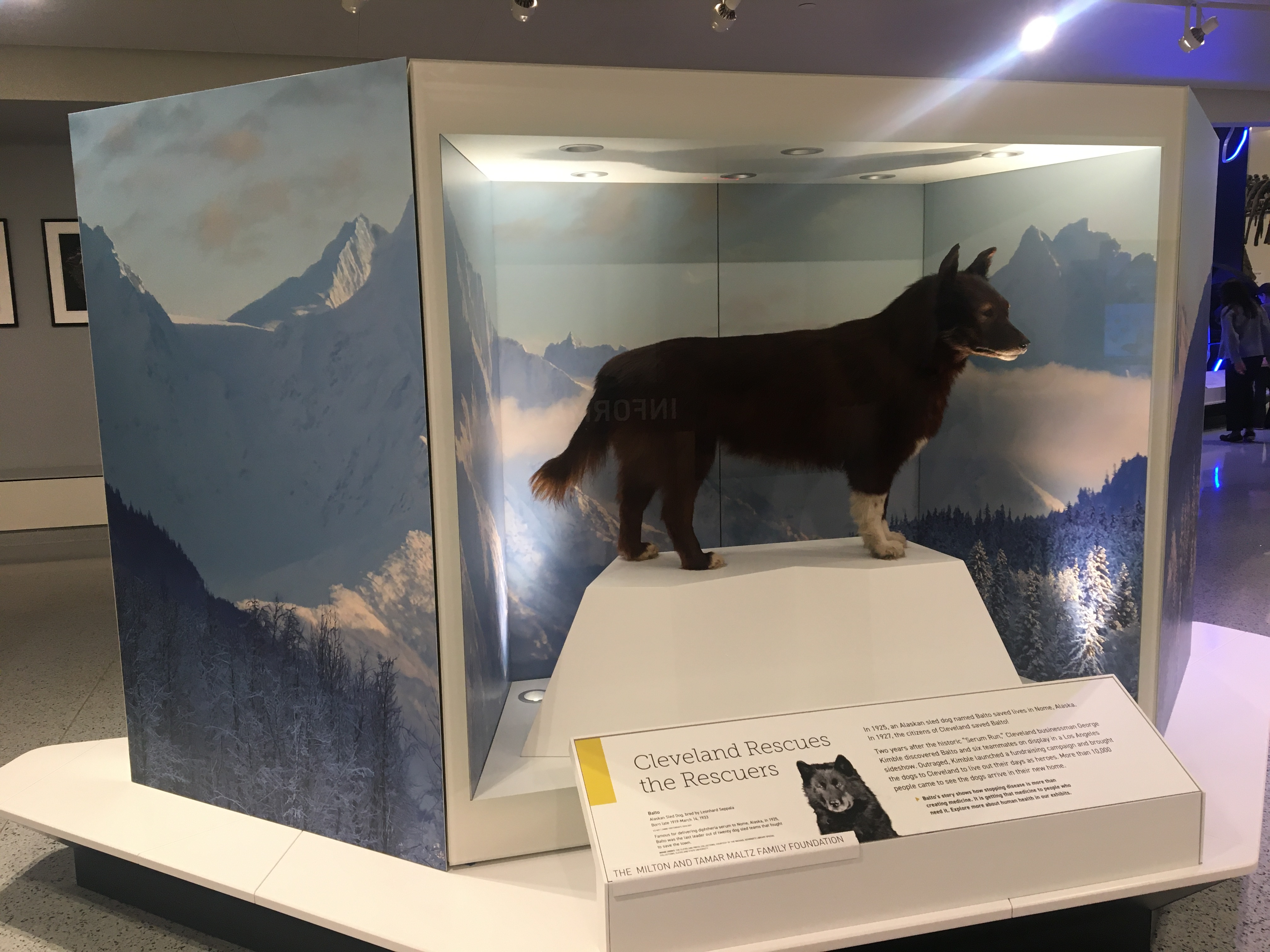
Balto's taxidermy remains at the Cleveland Museum of Natural History

Initially displayed, then placed in storage for several years, Balto was again put on public display in March 1940, coinciding with a dog show taking place at the Public Auditorium. Displays of Balto were intermittent in the years since, with his remains placed in cold storage at all other times. CMNH had so many animals in their collection that it became difficult to display Balto with greater frequency; in 1975, the Plain Dealer noted Balto's absence as the 50th anniversary of the serum run approached, prompting CMNH to arrange an exhibition. By 2000, CMNH centered Balto around exhibits about the serum run and Inuit, making his visibility permanent; wildlife resources director Harvey Webster said, "he's an icon ... [the serum run is] a story about the remarkable confluences of men and dogs who did the seemingly impossible in short order."

As part of a larger $150 million renovation project, Balto's remains were refurbished and reinstalled in CMNH's new Visitor Hall, which opened on October 15, 2023. Balto is among the museum's eight most iconic specimens that are represented in the Hall.

=== Return visits to Alaska ===
In early 1998, 22 second and third-grade students at Butte Elementary School in Palmer, Alaska, began a letter and petition drive to return Balto to Alaska after student Cody McGinn did a book report and discovered his remains were in Cleveland. Teacher Dwight Homstad viewed Balto's custody as a two-sided issue and that the students wanted to show the emotional attachment Alaskans still had toward Balto. Alaskan governor Tony Knowles endorsed the effort, writing to Homstad's class, "During a time of great need in Alaska's history, Balto persevered through treacherous and perilous conditions to save the lives of many Alaskans." Homstad also contracted for a shipping crate to be transported to CMNH containing the petitions and a video made of the students writing the petitions. By July 1998, the Alaska State Legislature passed a formal proclamation supporting Balto's return to Alaska. Homstad also offered the idea of a trade or barter with CMNH for Balto.

They were imploring the museum to send our doggie home. And we said: 'Wait a minute. He spent a majority of his life, actually, in Cleveland, and it was the community of Cleveland that saved him from a pretty despicable fate.'

— Harvey Webster, wildlife resources director, Cleveland Museum of Natural History

CMNH declined both the requests for a permanent return or of shared custody (the latter McGinn advocated for) citing Balto's purchase by the people of Cleveland, that Balto spent 60 percent of his life in Cleveland, and the fragile condition of his remains; one taxidermist estimated that, if properly cared for, a mounted specimen like Balto's can last for up to two lifetimes. Despite the initial refusal, the effort was soon publicized internationally with coverage in both People and CNN; one museum trustee learned of the dispute while on vacation in Indonesia. CMNH announced in August 1998 that Balto would be loaned to the Anchorage Museum of History and Art, who paid substantial money to insure his mount, for six months. The Anchorage Museum previously sought to have Balto displayed in an exhibit tied to the 1988 Iditarod Trail Sled Dog Race and were in negotiations with CMNH earlier in the year about a loan. Balto was placed in a special crate for the trip to Anchorage with the label "Contents: One Hero Dog", and a CMNH curator was present at the museum for the exhibition's duration.

A second exhibition of Balto took place at the Anchorage Museum between March and May 2017; again, a CMNH registrar accompanied Balto, who was placed in a climate-controlled crate on the flight to Alaska. Balto and Togo were displayed side-by-side as part of the 2017 exhibit.

== Legacy ==
=== Controversy, rivalries and reevaluation ===
The story had already heralded a winner by the time [Leonhard] Seppala made the 100 miles home. It was too complicated to showcase 20 drivers and 150 dogs. The relay as a concept was not as exciting as 'Balto crossed the finish line.'

— Gay Salisbury, historian

Controversy continues to surround Balto's celebrity status. Mushers have placed doubt on claims Balto truly led Kaasen's team, based primarily on his prior track record. No records exist of Seppala ever having used him as a leader in runs or races prior to 1925, and Seppala himself stated Balto "was never in a winning team" and was a "scrub dog". The pictures and film of Kaasen and Balto in Nome were recreated hours after their arrival once the sun had risen. Speculation still exists as to whether Balto's position as lead was genuine or staged for media purposes due to Balto being a more newsworthy and appealing name than Fox. One 1927 newspaper editorial published after Seppala's claim that Fox actually led Kaasen's team read, "[w]hether 'Balto' or 'Fox' matters little. The performance stands and the nation-wide emotion which it aroused is recorded in history. Somebody else wrote the works of Shakespeare, Homer was not the author of the Iliad. The lead dog on that historic trip to Nome was not Balto. What does it matter?" Balto remains more famous to the general public due to the long-held misconceptions about his role. While some historians note it is possible Balto led Kaasen's team, he at most likely ran co-lead with Fox rather than running single-lead by himself.

The aftermath of the serum run and the fame awarded to Balto and Kaasen initiated a feud between Seppala, Kaasen and Ed Rohn that lasted for the rest of their lives and has continued to the present day. Decorated mushers and others in the surrounding area—including Rohn, based on conversations the two men had before leaving Nome—believed that Kaasen's decision to not wake Rohn at Point Safety was motivated by a desire to grab the glory for himself. Conversely, supporters of Kaasen argue Rohn was inexperienced with mushing in severe weather. Despite being the subject of widespread fame alongside Balto, Kaasen rarely spoke about the run in later years and was reluctant to make public appearances. Other mushers and residents also died without providing a full account of their respective roles, making it unlikely for the facts to ever be known. The contribution of Alaska Natives, whose teams traveled the majority of the run, is also heavily obscured: while contributing to the area economy and the absence of language barriers, reporters and filmmakers were disinterested in their feats. Many of them died prior to the 1970s, when efforts were made to better preserve Alaskan history, and surviving mushers were given honorary "number one" designations in the early years of the Iditarod Trail Sled Dog Race.

=== Balto vs. Togo ===
The overlooking of Togo in popular culture has come to the displeasure of mushers, some of whom have reared dogs with bloodlines traced directly to Seppala's dogs and Togo specifically, something Balto could not do due to being neutered. Historian Jeff Dinsdale viewed the narrative around Balto as "heavily dependent on fantasy [that] evolved" to usurp Togo's feats and called Togo "the greatest sled dog of all time, sort of the Gordie Howe of dog sledding". Writer Kenneth Ungermann argued Balto's outsized fame was more a symbol of the feats achieved during the run, writing, "[t]o the American public, the glorified husky was representative of Jack, Dixie, Togo, and every other leader and dog that helped carry the antitoxin and hope to the people of Nome."

In a 2020 op-ed for the Anchorage Daily News, historian David Reamer criticized Balto Seppala Park in Anchorage for fostering "the misconception of Balto as the singular hero dog of Nome" and "[a]ny opportunity is a good opportunity to spread the worthy truth of Togo"; Reamer praised the movie Togo for remedying "a historical misjustice". In ranking the top 10 heroic animals for Time, Katy Steinmetz placed Togo at number one, writing, "the dog that often gets credit ... is Balto, but he just happened to run the last ... leg in the race. The sled dog who did the lion's share of the work was Togo." The National Park Service credits Togo for having "led his team across the most dangerous leg of the journey... though Balto received the credit for saving the town, to those who know more than the Disney story [sic], Balto is considered the backup dog". CMNH has recognized Togo as "a superb leader... courageous and strong, smart and possessing an exceptional ability to find the trail and sense danger".

The Cleveland Metroparks Zoo (successor to the Brookside Zoo) unveiled companion statues of Balto and Togo in 1997. In 2001, a statue of Togo was unveiled at Seward Park in New York City's Lower East Side, and later moved to a prominent position in the park by 2019; a change.org petition was also launched in late 2019 calling for the removal of Balto's Central Park statue in favor of a statue for Togo.

=== Cultural depictions ===
==== Books ====
- Alistair MacLean's 1959 novel Night Without End includes a sled dog named Balto, a fictional descendant and namesake of the original Balto.
- The 1966 Uncle Scrooge comic book North of the Yukon centered around the dog "Barko", created by Carl Barks as a direct homage to Balto.
- In January 1977, Margaret Davidson wrote Balto: The Dog Who Saved Nome, a children's book containing a telling of Balto's deeds.

==== Film ====
- The 1995 animated feature film Balto is loosely based on Balto and the serum run, but is notable for multiple inaccuracies, including depicting Balto as a wolfdog and ending the movie with the Central Park statue unveiling. After Steven Spielberg announced the film was in development through his Amblimation studio, CMNH extended an invitation to him to meet Balto's mount, but this request was declined. Two direct-to-video sequels, Balto II: Wolf Quest and Balto III: Wings of Change, were later released but contained no historical references.
- The 2019 movie Togo centers around Leonhard Seppala and Togo, with Balto getting a brief appearance. Unlike past depictions, Togo's contributions, including completing the serum run's longest and most perilous stretch, are highlighted, and it is made clear Balto got most of the credit.
- The Great Alaskan Race, also released in 2019 and written/directed by Brian Presley, focuses primarily on Seppala's role but also depicts the heroics of both teams, along with Balto and Togo individually. During production, the film's cast and crew visited Balto's Central Park statue.

==== Television ====
- The episode "Welcome Home, Balto" of the PBS Kids series Molly of Denali centers around protagonist Molly Mabray learning about Balto's story and being inspired to create a statue of him.

== Genome sequencing ==
Genealogy of Balto
1. Siberian huskies (39.0%)
2. Greenland dogs (18.0%)
3. Samoyeds (6.00%)
4. Alaskan malamutes (4.00%)
5. Chinese village dogs (17.0%)
6. New Guinea singing dogs (7.00%)
7. Other (9.00%)

Balto's DNA was analyzed and sequenced as part of the Zoonomia Project, an international collaboration that has mapped the genomes of over 240 mammals. After being approached by Cornell University associate professor Heather Huson about including Balto in Zoonomia, CMNH agreed and sent a skin sample to University of California, Santa Cruz professor Katherine Moon. CMNH chief science officer Gavin Svenson was enthusiastic about the project and noted advancements in technology have since made it easier to map out genomes from 100-year old DNA. Compared with the genomes of 682 modern-day dogs and wolves, in addition to the 240 mammals in Zoonomia, Balto's genome was found to be more diverse with fewer unhealthy variants than modern purebred dogs and more similar to today's Alaskan huskies often outcrossed to promote better fitness and health.

Balto shared part of his ancestry with modern Siberian Huskies (39 percent) as well as Greenland Dogs (18 percent), Chinese village dogs (17 percent), Samoyeds (6 percent) and Alaskan Malamutes (4 percent). Balto had several DNA adaptations that promoted Arctic survival, including a thick double coat, the ability to digest starch, and bone and tissue development. Researchers were also able to accurately predict how Balto would have looked—fur coat color, eyes and fur thickness—from his surviving DNA, which was cross-referenced with historical photos and his remains. Testing also disproved the urban legend that Balto had grey wolf genetics; Moon said, "[h]e was not a wolf, he was just a good boy."

== See also ==
- List of individual dogs
- Iditarod Trail
- Northern (genre)
- Hachikō
- Togo (dog)
