= Togo (dog) =

Sled dog who ran in the 1925 serum run to Nome, Alaska

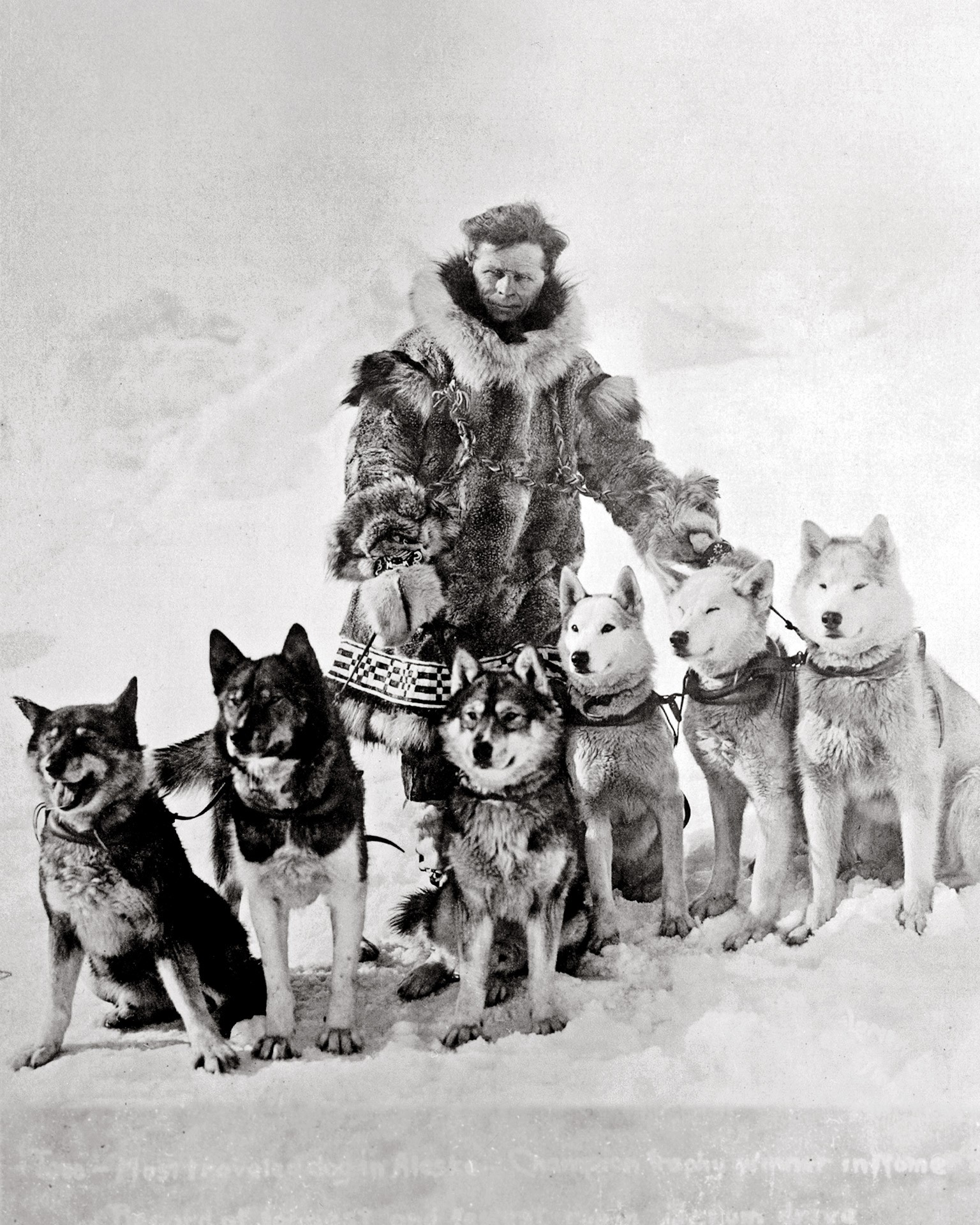
- Leonhard Seppala with sled dogs from his kennel – Togo is at far left. Other dogs from left to right: Karinsky, Jafet, Pete, Zeus, Fritz
- Species: Canis lupus familiaris
- Breed: Seppala Siberian Sleddog
- Sex: Male
- Born: 1913
- Died: December 5, 1929 (aged 15–16); Poland Spring, Maine
- Resting place: Iditarod Trail Headquarters Museum (skin); University of Alaska Museum of the North (skeleton)
- Occupation: Sled dog
- Known for: 1925 serum run to Nome
- Owner: Leonhard Seppala
- Parent: Suggen x Dolly (Import)
- Offspring: Togo (II), Kingeak, Paddy, Bilka (and others).
- Appearance: Dark grey, black and brown coat (Agouti) of medium length with light undersides and patches. Grew to ~48 lbs in adulthood. Large front paws, wide muzzle, and damaged right ear which can be used to identify him easily in many pictures. Brown eyes.
- Named after: Tōgō Heihachirō
- Awards: Most Traveled Dog in Alaska, Champion Trophy Winner in Nome, Record of Longest and Fastest run in Serum Drive, The Most Heroic Animal of all Time

Togo (1913 – December 5, 1929) was the lead sled dog of musher Leonhard Seppala and his dog sled team in the 1925 serum run to Nome across central and northern Alaska. Despite covering a far greater distance than any other lead dogs on the run, over some of the most dangerous parts of the trail, his role was left out of contemporary news of the event at the time, in favor of the lead dog for the last leg of the relay, Balto, whom Seppala also owned and had bred.

Deemed at first a troublemaker, before being identified as a leader by Seppala, Togo had shown feats of dedication and endurance as a puppy, and as an adult continued to show feats of intelligence, saving the lives of his team and musher on several occasions. Sled dogs bred from his line have contributed to the 'Seppala Siberian' sleddog line, as well as the mainstream Siberian Husky gene pool.

== Background ==
Togo was one of the offspring of former lead dog Suggen and the female Siberian import Dolly. Early pedigree records are inconsistent in his birth year, including those kept by his breeder Viktor Anderson and his owner, Seppala; most sources published list his birth year as 1913, but no other form of consensus exists on his exact time of birth. He was named Cugu [tso`go], which means puppy in Northern Sami language, and later after the Japanese Admiral, Tōgō Heihachirō. Initially, he did not look like he had potential as a sled dog. He only grew to about 48 pounds (22 kg) in adulthood and had a black, brown, and gray coat that made him appear perpetually dirty.

Togo was ill as a young puppy and required intensive nursing from Seppala's wife. He was very bold and rowdy, thus seen as "difficult and mischievous", showing "all the signs of becoming a ... canine delinquent" according to one reporter. At first, this behaviour was interpreted as evidence that he had been spoiled by the individual attention given to him during his illness. As he did not seem suited to be a sled dog, Seppala gave him away to be a pet dog at 6 months of age.

After only a few weeks as a house pet, Togo jumped through the glass of a closed window and ran several miles back to his original master's kennel. This devotion to the team impressed Seppala, so he did not try to give him away again. However, Togo continued to cause trouble by breaking out of the kennel when Seppala took the team out on runs. He would attack the lead dogs of oncoming teams, "as if ... to clear the way for his master". However, one day, he attacked a much stockier malamute leader and was mauled and severely injured. When he recovered, Togo stopped attacking other teams' lead dogs. This would eventually prove a valuable early experience, as it was difficult to teach a lead dog to keep a wide berth of oncoming teams.

When Togo was 8 months old, he proved his worth as a sled dog. Seppala had been hired by a client to transport him quickly to a newly discovered gold claim which would be an overnight round trip for the team. Unable to spare extra time dealing with the young Togo's antics, Seppala tethered him inside the kennel with instructions left to not let him free until he and the team were well and gone. A short while after Seppala had left, Togo broke free of the tether and jumped the kennel fence, getting his paw caught in the process. A kennel handler noticed and cut the dog down from the fencing, but before he could grab him, Togo took off to follow the team's trail. He followed them through nightfall and slept, unnoticed, near the cabin where Seppala was spending the night. The next day, Seppala spotted him far off in the distance, and understood why his dogs had been so keyed up. Togo continued to make Seppala's work difficult on the return trip to the kennel, trying to play with the work dogs and leading them in "charges against reindeer", pulling them off the trail. Seppala had no choice but to put him in a harness to control him, and was surprised that Togo instantly settled down. As the run wore on, Seppala kept moving Togo up the line until, at the end of the day, he was sharing the lead position with the lead dog (named "Russky"). Togo had logged 75 miles on his first day in harness, which was unheard of for an inexperienced young sled dog, especially a puppy. Seppala called him an "infant prodigy", and later added that "I had found a natural-born leader, something I had tried for years to breed."

Togo began training, and after a few years filled the lead dog position nearly fulltime, often running in single-lead, without a partner. His prowess as a leader consisted of many impressive feats of intelligence and endurance, documented by writers and historians through accounts by Seppala himself. One such occasion was during a crossing of the Norton Sound in a deadly northeast gale; Seppala had ordered Togo to turn to avoid a crack forming in the ice, and immediately after doing so Togo abruptly stopped and somersaulted backward into the rest of the team without being commanded to stop moving. When Seppala arrived at the front of the team to scold the dog, he discovered that Togo had bailed not on the trail, but to avoid an open, growing water channel less than 6 feet from the team which was not visible from the sled, having saved all of them from nearly drowning in the freezing water. Another impressive feat was during the same trip across the Sound. When arriving at the shore of the Bering Sea, the ice floe the team was on top of was too far from land for them to cross or Seppala to jump over. He hitched Togo in single lead with an anchor in the ice and tossed him across to pull the ice closer to the shore. Togo understood and dug in, however the line snapped, suddenly leaving Seppala and the team stranded. Without guidance or prompting, Togo leapt into the water, took the broken line in his mouth, spun around to wrap it around his shoulders twice fashioning a makeshift harness, and pulled the ice floe to shore, his team with it.

Togo went on to become one of Seppala's most treasured dogs, a close and mutually beneficial relationship that would continue to the end of Togo's life. At the time of the historic Serum Run, he was 12 years old and had been a lead dog for 7 years.

== Great Race of Mercy ==
In 1925, in response to an epidemic, the first batch of 300,240 units of diphtheria serum was delivered by train from Anchorage to Nenana, Alaska, where it was picked up by the first of twenty mushers and more than 100 dogs who relayed the serum a total of 674 miles (1,085 km) to Nome.

Togo and Seppala ran 170 miles (270 km) east from Nome to just outside Shaktoolik, where they met the serum relay coming the other way on January 31 (Seppala had expected to go all the way to Nulato and back alone). After the handoff, they returned another 91 miles (146 km) to Golovin where they passed the serum to Charlie Olsen's team, having run over 261 miles (420 km) altogether across some of the most dangerous and treacherous parts of the run. In total, the team traveled 260 miles (420 km) from Nome in three days. The temperature was estimated at −30 °F (−34 °C), and the gale force winds causing a wind chill of −85 °F (−65 °C).

The return trip crossed the exposed open ice of the Norton Sound. The night and a ground blizzard prevented Seppala from being able to see the path but Togo navigated to the roadhouse at Isaac's Point on the shore by 8pm preventing certain death to his team. After traveling 84 miles (134 km) in one day, the team slept for six hours before continuing at 2 am.

Before the night the temperature dropped to −40 °F (−40 °C), and the wind increased to 65 mi/h (105 km/h). The team ran across the ice, which was breaking up, while following the shoreline. They returned to shore to cross Little McKinley Mountain, climbing 5,000 feet (1,500 m). After descending to the next roadhouse in Golovin, Seppala passed the serum to Charlie Olsen, who in turn would pass it to Gunnar Kaasen and Balto.

== Aftermath and legacy ==
In October 1926, Seppala, Togo, and a team of dogs went on a tour from Seattle, Washington to California; Seppala and Togo drew large crowds at stadiums and department stores, and even appeared in a Lucky Strike cigarette campaign. In New York City, Seppala drove his team from the steps of City Hall along Fifth Avenue and made a pass through Central Park. The team appeared multiple times at Madison Square Garden, which was being managed by Tom Rickard, formerly of Nome, and where on December 30, Togo was awarded a gold medal by Roald Amundsen.

In New England, they competed in several dog sled races against local Chinooks of Arthur Walden and won by huge margins. The success of Seppala's races and the celebrity afforded to the dogs and mushers by the Serum Run, allowed Seppala to begin a Siberian dog kennel and partnership with Elizabeth M. Ricker in Poland Spring, Maine. Togo was left to live at the Ricker kennel to enjoy a life of luxury in his retirement from sled work, and was bred over the next several years, laying down the foundation for the modern Siberian sled dog breeds, known as the "Seppala Siberian Sleddog", and the Siberian Husky.

In 1928, Elizabeth M. Ricker, of Poland Spring, Maine, wrote and published the book Togo's Fireside Reflections. Seppala inked Togo's paw and helped Togo sign some of the books.

=== Death and posthumous recognition ===
After several years of retirement at the Ricker Kennel in Poland Spring, Togo was euthanized by Seppala on December 5, 1929, at 16 years old because of joint pain and partial blindness. The headline in The New York Sun Times the next day was "Dog Hero Rides to His Death" (Salisbury & Salisbury, 2003), and he was eulogized in many other papers. After his death, Seppala had him custom mounted. The mounted skin was on display at the Shelburne Museum in Shelburne, Vermont. Alaskan students started a letter campaign to return Togo to Alaska. Today the mounted skin is on display in a glass case at the Iditarod Trail Sled Dog Race Headquarters museum in Wasilla, Alaska. The Peabody Museum of Natural History at Yale University had his skeleton in their collection. In September 2026, Togo's bones were given by the Peabody Museum to the University of Alaska Museum of the North.

The National Park Service notes that in 1960, Seppala said "I never had a better dog than Togo. His stamina, loyalty and intelligence could not be improved upon. Togo was the best dog that ever traveled the Alaska trail."

Togo's reputation earned him enduring fame, but only in 1997 got for the first time a statue, although sitting alongside Balto's statue at Cleveland Metroparks Zoo. In 2001, he finally got an individual statue, but of a minor size initially at New York City's Lower East Side and later moved to Seward Park.

In 2011, Time magazine named Togo the most heroic animal of all time:

"The dog that often gets credit for eventually saving the town is Balto, but he just happened to run the last, 55-mile leg in the race. The sled dog who did the lion's share of the work was Togo. His journey, fraught with white-out storms, was the longest by 200 miles and included a traverse across perilous Norton Sound — where he saved his team and driver in a courageous swim through ice floes."

On September 17, 2022, a bronze statue of Togo was unveiled in Poland Springs, Maine, where Togo spent his last years as a stud dog. Maine musher Jonathan Hayes of the current Poland Spring Seppala Kennels embarked on a 285-mile expedition the previous year with his team of direct descendants of Togo to raise funds for the statue, with a documentary to raise awareness for the project. The statue was designed by Maine artist David Smus, and stands outside the historic Maine State Building on the resort campus.

== Film adaptations ==
A film adaptation about Togo's efforts was produced by Walt Disney Pictures and released on December 20, 2019, on Disney+. Willem Dafoe stars in the film as Leonhard Seppala, the owner of Togo. Principal production on the film ran from September 24, 2018, to February 2019 in Calgary. Togo was portrayed by dog actor Diesel, who is a direct descendant of Togo 14 generations back. A second film, The Great Alaskan Race, also depicts Balto and Togo.

== See also ==
- Balto
- Hachikō
- List of individual dogs
