= Edgar Nollner =

Alaskan musher in the 1925 Alaska Serum Run (1904–1999)

Edgar Nollner, Sr. (November 11, 1904 – January 18, 1999) was a musher, hunter, fisherman and woodcutter who lived in Galena, Alaska. He was the longest surviving musher who participated in the 1925 serum run to Nome.

== Contribution to the 1925 serum run ==
Nollner gained historical recognition as one of the mushers in the 1925 serum run to Nome, often referred to as the "Great Race of Mercy". This relay of dog sled teams transported diphtheria antitoxin across nearly 700 miles of harsh Arctic terrain to combat an outbreak in Nome, Alaska. The epidemic posed a serious threat to the population, and a rapid response was necessary to prevent widespread fatalities.

Nollner, alongside his brother George, participated in the relay. He covered a 24-mile segment of the route from Whiskey Creek to Galena, braving extreme cold and hazardous conditions. His contribution was instrumental in ensuring the safe passage of the life-saving serum.

== Personal life and legacy ==
Nollner was born in 1904, the son of a Missouri man and a native Alaskan Athabaskan, in Old Village, ten miles upriver from Galena on January 18, 1999. He died of heart failure at age 94.

He had been married twice and had 23 children. When he died he had about 200 grandchildren.

== See also ==
- Balto – noted sled dog from the serum run
