= 1925 serum run to Nome =

Transport of medication by dog-sled relay across Alaska

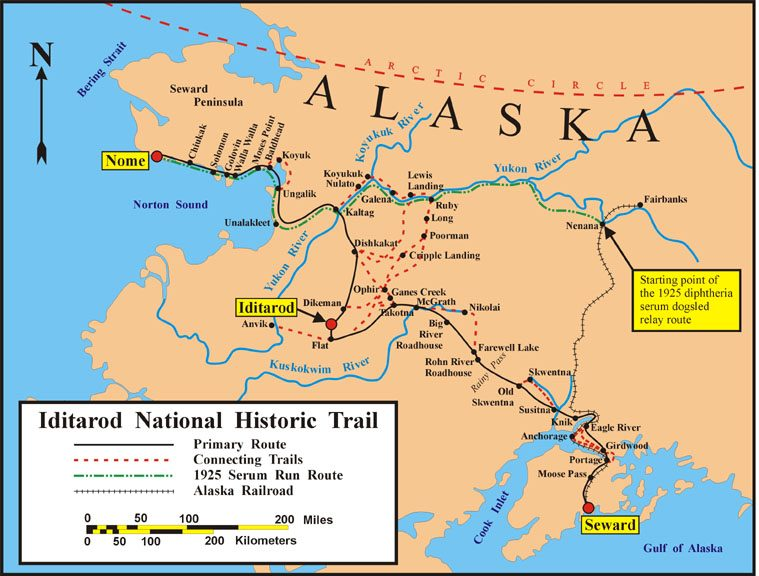
A map of the historical and current Iditarod trails. The route taken during the 1925 serum run is shown in green.

The 1925 serum run to Nome, also known as the Great Race of Mercy and The Serum Run, was a transport of diphtheria antitoxin by dog sled relay across the US territory of Alaska by 20 mushers and about 150 sled dogs across 674 miles (1,085 km) in 5 1/2 days, saving the small town of Nome and the surrounding communities from a developing epidemic of diphtheria.

Both the mushers and their dogs were portrayed as heroes in the newly popular medium of radio and received headline coverage in newspapers across the United States. Balto, the lead sled dog on the final stretch into Nome, became the most famous canine celebrity of the era after Rin Tin Tin, and his statue is a popular tourist attraction in both New York City's Central Park and downtown Anchorage, Alaska. Togo's team covered much of the most dangerous parts of the route and ran the farthest: Togo's team covered 261 miles (420 km) while Balto's team ran 55 miles (89 km).

== Location and geography ==
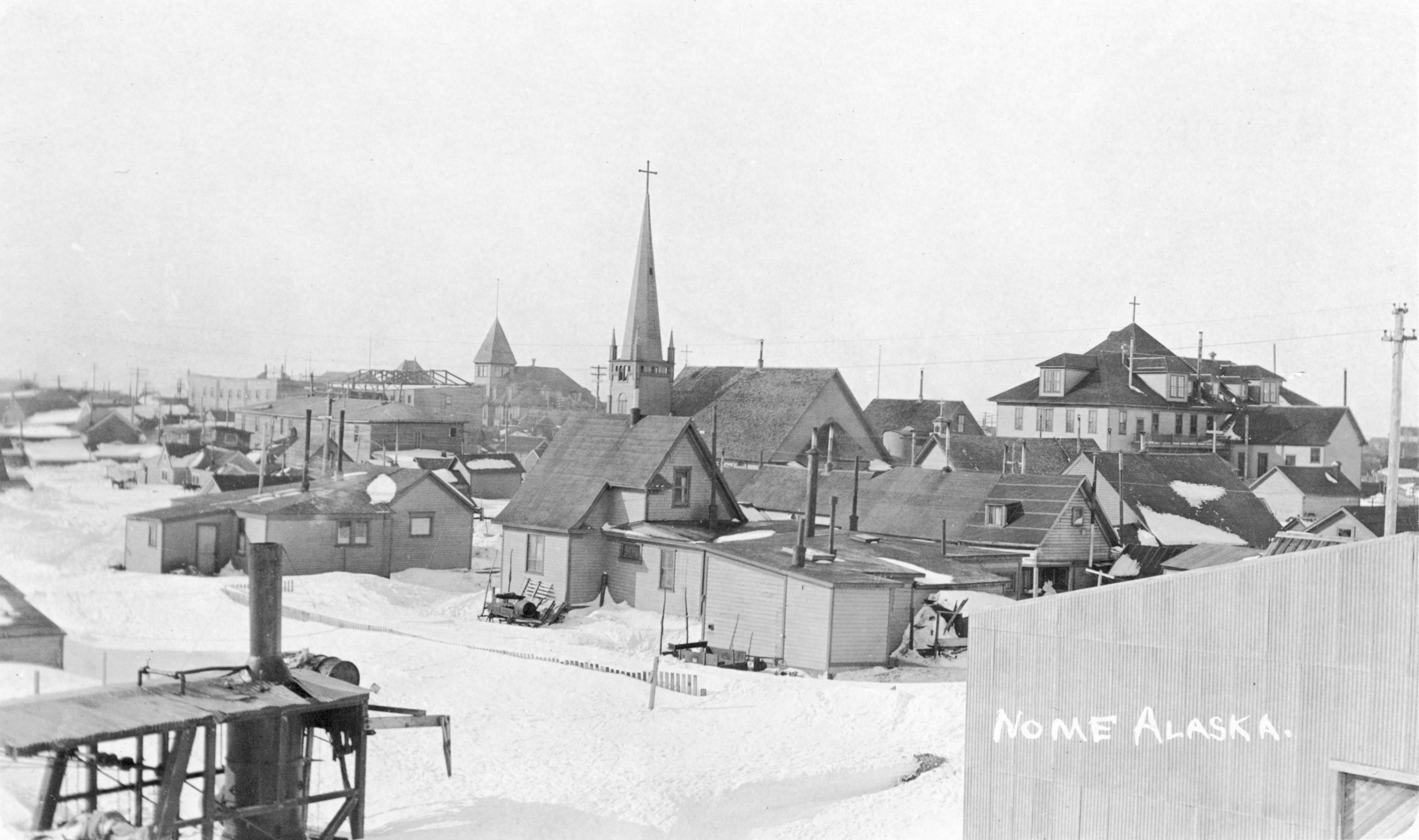
A view of Nome in 1916

Nome, Alaska, lies approximately two degrees south of the Arctic Circle, and while greatly diminished from its peak of 20,000 inhabitants during the Nome Gold Rush at the turn of the 20th century, it was still the largest town in northern Alaska in 1925, with 455 Alaska Natives and 975 settlers of European descent.

From November to July, the port on the southern shore of the Seward Peninsula of the Bering Sea was icebound and inaccessible by steamship. The only link to the rest of the world during the winter was the Iditarod Trail, which ran 938 miles (1,510 km) from the port of Seward in the south, across several mountain ranges and the vast Alaska Interior, to the town of Nome. In Alaska and other subarctic regions, the primary source of mail and needed supplies in 1925 was the dog sled. Within a decade, bush flying became the dominant method of transportation during the winter months.

== Outbreak and call for help ==
In the winter of 1924–1925, Curtis Welch was the only doctor in Nome. He and four nurses, working at the small Maynard Columbus Hospital, served the town and the surrounding area. After discovering the hospital's entire batch of diphtheria antitoxin had expired, Welch placed an order for more. However, the replacement shipment did not arrive before the port was closed by ice for the winter, and more could not be shipped in to Nome until spring.

In December 1924, several days after the last ship left the port, Welch treated a few children for what he first diagnosed as sore throats or tonsillitis, initially dismissing diphtheria as a possibility; given its contagious nature, Welch would have expected to see more symptoms in family members or others around town, instead of a few isolated cases. In the next few weeks, after the number of cases grew and four children were dead—whom Welch had not been able to autopsy—he became increasingly concerned about diphtheria.

By mid-January 1925, Welch officially diagnosed the first case of diphtheria in a three-year-old boy who died only two weeks after first becoming ill. The following day, when a seven-year-old girl presented the same symptoms of diphtheria, Welch attempted to administer some of the expired antitoxin to see if it might still have any effect, but the girl died a few hours later. Realizing that an epidemic was imminent, Welch called Nome's mayor, George Maynard, that same evening to arrange an emergency town council meeting. The council immediately implemented a quarantine. The following day, on January 22, 1925, Welch sent radio telegrams to all other major towns in Alaska alerting them of the public health risk. He also requested assistance from the U.S. Public Health Service in Washington, D.C.:

An epidemic of diphtheria is almost inevitable here STOP I am in urgent need of one million units of diphtheria antitoxin STOP Mail is only form of transportation STOP I have made application to Commissioner of Health of the Territories for antitoxin already STOP There are about 3000 white natives in the district.

Despite the quarantine, there were over 20 confirmed cases of diphtheria and at least 50 more at risk by the end of January. Without antitoxin, it was expected that in the surrounding region's population of around 10,000 people, the mortality rate could be close to 100 percent. A previous influenza pandemic had hit the area in 1918, causing fatalities in about 50 percent of the native population of Nome and 8% of the native population of Alaska. More than 1,000 people died in northwest Alaska, and approximately 2,000 across the territory. The majority were Alaska Natives who did not have any resistance to either disease.

== Problem solving ==
At the January 24 meeting of the board of health, superintendent Mark Summers of the Hammon Consolidated Gold Fields proposed a dogsled relay using two fast teams. One would start at Nenana, Alaska, the closest railhead on the Alaska Railroad, and the other at Nome, and they would meet roughly halfway in the town of Nulato. The trip from Nulato to Nome normally took 30 days. Curtis Welch estimated that the serum would last only six days under the brutal conditions of the trail.

Summers's employee, the Norwegian sled dog trainer and musher Leonhard Seppala, was chosen for the 630-mile (1,014 km) round trip from Nome to Nulato and back. He had previously made the run in a record-breaking four days, won the All-Alaska Sweepstakes three times, and had become famous for his athletic ability and rapport with his Siberian huskies. His lead dog, the 12-year-old Togo, was equally famous for his leadership, intelligence, and ability to sense danger.

Maynard proposed flying the antitoxin by plane. In 1925, planes were a relatively new technology, and Alaska's harsh winter weather made them unreliable. Several test flights had been conducted the previous year between Fairbanks and McGrath, Alaska, to determine how well a reliable aircraft could handle the winter conditions. The longest test flight flew a distance of only 260 miles (420 km), a little under half the necessary distance between Nenana and Nome.

The only planes operating in Alaska in 1925 were three vintage biplanes, which had been dismantled for the winter. Their open cockpits and water-cooled engines would make these planes unfit for the trip as well. Although it was potentially quicker, the proposal to deliver the antitoxin by flight was rejected by the board of health. Instead, they voted unanimously for the dogsled relay. Seppala was notified that evening and immediately began preparations for the trip.

The U.S. Public Health Service had located 1.1 million units of serum in West Coast hospitals which could be shipped to Seattle, Washington, and then transported to Alaska. The next ship north would not arrive in Seattle until January 31, and it would take another six to seven days to arrive in Seward. On January 26, 300,000 forgotten units of the antitoxin were located in a hospital in Anchorage. The supply was wrapped in glass vials, then padded quilts, and finally a metallic cylinder weighing a little over 20 pounds (9 kg). At Governor Scott Bone's order, it was immediately shipped to Nenana and arrived the next day. While not sufficient to defeat the epidemic, the 300,000 units could slow the spread of the disease until the larger shipment arrived.

== Relay ==
The mail route from Nenana to Nome spanned 674 miles (1,085 km) in total. It crossed the barren Alaska Interior, following the Tanana River for 137 miles (220 km) to the village Tanana at the junction with the Yukon River, and then following the Yukon for 230 miles (370 km) to Kaltag. The route then passed west 90 miles (140 km) over the Kaltag Portage to Unalakleet on the shore of Norton Sound. The route then continued for 208 miles (335 km) northwest around the southern shore of the Seward Peninsula with no protection from gales and blizzards, including a 42-mile (68 km) stretch across the shifting ice of the Bering Sea.

Edward Wetzler, the US Postal Service inspector for Nenana, contacted Tom Parson, an agent of the Northern Commercial Company, contracted to deliver mail between Fairbanks and Unalakleet. Telephones and telegraphs turned the drivers back to their assigned roadhouses. The mail carriers held a revered position in the territory, and were the best dog mushers in Alaska. The majority of relay drivers across the Interior were native Athabaskans, direct descendants of the original dog mushers.

The first musher in the relay was "Wild Bill" Shannon, who was handed the 20 pounds (9 kg) package at the train station in Nenana on January 27 at 9:00 pm AKST by night. Despite a temperature of −50 °F (−46 °C), Shannon left immediately with his team of 9 inexperienced dogs, led by Blackie. The temperature began to drop, and the team was forced onto the colder ice of the river because the trail had been destroyed by horses.

Despite jogging alongside the sled to keep warm, Shannon developed hypothermia. He reached Minto at 3 am, with parts of his face black from frostbite. The temperature was −62 °F (−52 °C). After warming the serum by the fire and resting for four hours, Shannon dropped three dogs and left with the remaining 8. The three dogs died shortly after Shannon returned for them, and a fourth may have died as well.

=== Arrival in Minto ===
Half-Athabaskan Edgar Kalland arrived in Minto the night before, and was sent back to Tolovana, traveling 70 mi (110 km) the day before the relay. Shannon and his team arrived in bad condition at 11 am, and handed over the serum. After warming the serum in the roadhouse, Kalland headed into the forest. The temperature had fallen to −56 °F (−49 °C), causing Kalland's hands to freeze to the sled's handlebar, requiring the owner of the Manley Hot Springs roadhouse to pour boiling water on the birch wood bar for thawing.

No new cases of diphtheria were diagnosed on January 28, but two new cases were diagnosed on January 29. The quarantine had been obeyed, but lack of diagnostic tools and the contagiousness of the strain rendered it ineffective. More units of serum were discovered around Juneau the same day. While no count exists, the estimate based on weight is roughly 125,000 units, enough to treat 4 to 6 patients. The crisis had become headline news in newspapers, including in San Francisco, Cleveland, Washington D.C., and New York, and spread to the radio sets which were just becoming common. The storm system from Alaska hit the contiguous United States, bringing record lows to New York, and freezing the Hudson River.

A fifth death occurred on January 30. Maynard and Alaskan House Delegate Daniel Sutherland renewed their campaign for flying the remaining serum by plane. Different proposals included flying a large aircraft 2,000 miles (3,200 km) from Seattle to Nome, carrying a plane to the edge of the pack ice via Navy ship and launching it, and the original plan of flying the serum from Fairbanks. Despite receiving headline coverage across the country and support from Arctic explorer Roald Amundsen, the plans were rejected by experienced pilots, the Navy, and Governor Bone. As publisher and editor of the Fairbanks Daily News-Miner newspaper, William Fentress Thompson harshly criticized government officials for inaction and funded a private fleet of planes.

In response, Governor Bone decided to speed up the relay, authorizing additional drivers for Seppala's leg of the relay, so they could travel without rest. Seppala was still scheduled to cover the most dangerous leg, the shortcut across Norton Sound, but the telephone and telegraph systems bypassed the small villages he was passing through, and there was no way to tell him to wait at Shaktoolik. The plan relied on the driver from the north catching Seppala on the trail. Summers arranged for drivers along the last leg, including Seppala's colleague Gunnar Kaasen.

From Manley Hot Springs, the serum passed through largely Athabascan hands before George Nollner delivered it to Charlie Evans at Bishop Mountain on January 30 at 3 am. The temperature had warmed slightly, but at −62 °F (−52 °C), was dropping again. Evans relied on his lead dogs when he passed through ice fog where the Koyukuk River, flowing into the Yukon, had broken through and surged over the ice, but forgot to protect the groins of his two short-haired mixed breed lead dogs with rabbit skins. Both dogs collapsed with frostbite, with Evans having to take their place himself pulling the sled. He arrived at 10 am; both dogs were dead. Tommy Patsy departed within half an hour.

The transport of the serum then parted ways with the Yukon River as the river turned south and the trail crossed the Kaltag Portage west to the coast. Athabascan Jack Nicolai, aka "Jackscrew", took it up the first half of the portage to Old Woman Cabin and Victor Anagick of the Inupiat village Unalakleet, having driven up to meet him there, took it down the second half, handing it to his fellow villager Myles Gonangnan on the shores of Norton Sound in Unalakleet on January 31 at 5 am. Gonangnan saw the signs of a storm brewing, and decided not to take the shortcut across the dangerous ice of the Sound. He departed at 5:30 am, and as he crossed the hills, "the eddies of drifting, swirling snow passing between the dog's legs and under the bellies made them appear to be fording a fast running river." The whiteout conditions cleared as he reached the shore, and the gale-force winds drove the wind chill to −70 °F (−57 °C). At 3 pm, he arrived at Shaktoolik. Seppala was not there, but Henry Ivanoff was waiting just in case.

On January 30, the number of cases in Nome had reached 27 and the antitoxin was depleted. According to a reporter living in Nome, "All hope is in the dogs and their heroic drivers ... Nome appears to be a deserted city." With the report of Gonangnan's progress on January 31, Welch believed the serum would arrive there in February.

=== Connection on Norton Sound ===
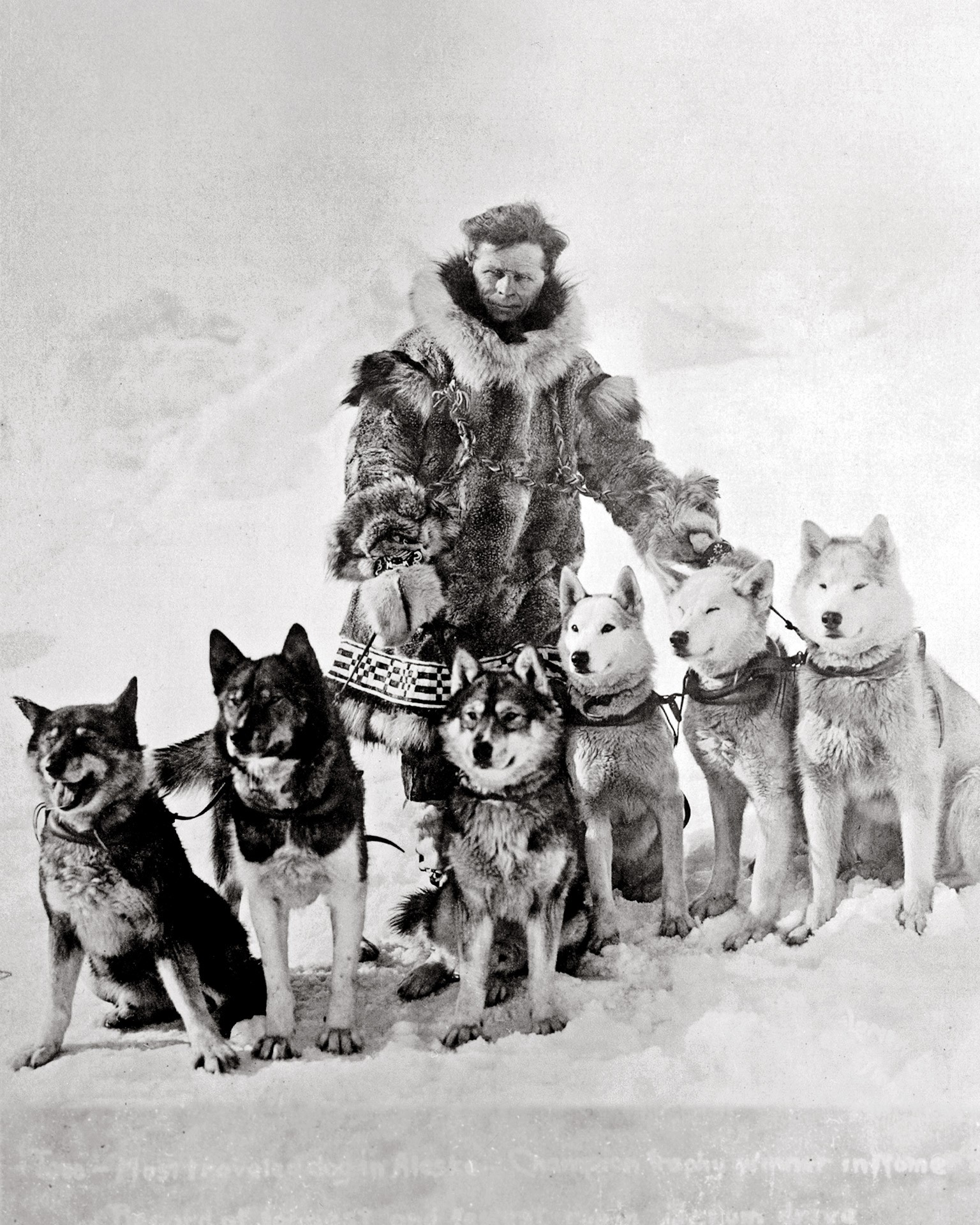
Leonhard Seppala with his dogs after the serum run in 1925. His lead dog, Togo, is on the far left.

Leonhard Seppala and his dog sled team, with his lead dog Togo, travelled 91 miles (146 km) from Nome from January 27 to January 31 into the oncoming storm. They took the shortcut across the Norton Sound, and headed toward Shaktoolik. The temperature in Nome was a relatively warm −20 °F (−29 °C), but in Shaktoolik, the temperature was estimated at −30 °F (−34 °C), and the gale force winds causing a wind chill of −85 °F (−65 °C).

Henry Ivanoff's team ran into a reindeer and got tangled up just outside Shaktoolik. Seppala still believed he had more than 100 mi (160 km) to the original relay point in Nulato to go and had raced to get off the Norton Sound before the storm hit. He was passing the team when Ivanoff shouted, "The serum! The serum! I have it here!"

Seppala turned around with the serum but it was dark by the time he got to Ungalik. But with the news of the worsening epidemic Ivanoff had shared, he decided not to stop and once again set out to brave the storm across the 20 miles (32 km) of exposed open ice of the Norton Sound. The temperature was estimated at −30 °F (−34 °C), but the wind chill with the gale force winds was −85 °F (−65 °C). Togo led the team in a straight line through the dark, and they arrived at the roadhouse in Isaac's Point on the other side at 8 pm. In one day, they had travelled 84 mi (135 km), averaging 8 mph (13 km/h). The team rested, and departed at 2 am into the full power of the storm.

During the night, the temperature dropped to −40 °F (−40 °C), and the wind increased to storm force (at least 65 mph [105 km/h]). While they slept, it had blown out to sea all the ice Seppala had just crossed. There was still some ice close to shore for the next part of their journey along the coast, but it was rough and starting to break up too. They stuck close to shore, and Togo picked his way carefully until they were back on solid ground.

Next they had to cross Little McKinley Mountain (1,200 feet [370 m]), another of the toughest parts of the trail because of the many up-and-down ridges. The total elevation climbed in that section of over 8 miles (13 km) is 5,000 feet (1,500 m). After descending to the next roadhouse in Golovin, Seppala passed the serum to Charlie Olsen on February 1 at 3 pm.

On February 1, the number of cases in Nome rose to 28. The serum en route was sufficient to treat 30 people. With the powerful blizzard raging and winds of 80 mph (130 km/h), Welch ordered a stop to the relay until the storm passed, reasoning that a delay was better than the risk of losing all the serum. Messages were left at Solomon and Point Safety before the lines went dead.

Olsen was blown off the trail, and suffered severe frostbite in his hands while putting blankets on his dogs. The wind chill was −70 °F (−57 °C). He arrived at Bluff on February 1 at 7 pm in poor condition. Gunnar Kaasen waited until 10 pm for the storm to break, but it only got worse and the drifts would soon block the trail, so he departed into a headwind.

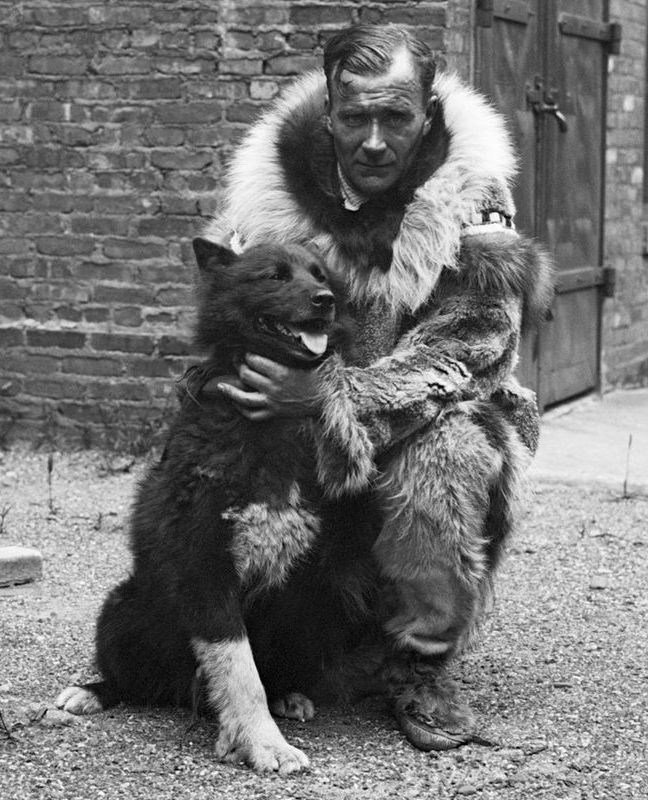
Gunnar Kaasen with Balto, the lead dog for the team he drove in the serum run

Kaasen traveled through the night, through drifts, and river overflow over the 600-foot (183 m) Topkok Mountain. Balto led the team through visibility so poor that Kaasen could not always see the dogs harnessed closest to the sled. He was two miles (3 km) past Solomon before he realized it, and kept going. The winds after Solomon were so severe that his sled flipped over and he almost lost the cylinder containing the serum when it fell off and became buried in the snow. He also suffered frostbite when he had to use his bare hands to feel for the cylinder.

Kaasen reached Point Safety ahead of schedule on February 2, at 3 am. Ed Rohn believed that Kaasen and the relay had halted at Solomon, so he was sleeping. Since the weather was improving, it would take time to prepare Rohn's team, and Balto and the other dogs were moving well, Kaasen pressed on with the remaining 25 miles (40 km) to Nome, reaching Front Street at 5:30 am. Not a single ampule was broken, and the antitoxin was thawed and ready by noon.

Together, the teams covered the 674 miles (1,085 km) in 127 1/2 hours, which was considered a world record, done in extreme subzero temperatures in near-blizzard conditions and hurricane-force winds. A number of dogs died during the trip.

== Second relay ==
Margaret Curran from the Solomon Roadhouse was infected, which raised fears that the disease might spread from patrons of the roadhouse to other communities. The 1.1 million units had left Seattle on January 31, and were not due by dog sled until February 8. Welch asked for half the serum to be delivered by aircraft from Fairbanks. He contacted Thompson and Sutherland, and Darling made a test flight the next morning. With his health advisor, Governor Bone concluded the cases in Nome were actually going down, and withheld permission, but preparations went ahead. The U.S. Navy moved a minesweeper north from Seattle, and the Signal Corps were ordered to light fires to guide the planes.

By February 3, the original 300,000 units had proved to be still effective, and the epidemic was under control. A sixth death, probably unrelated to diphtheria, was widely reported as a new outbreak of the disease. The batch from Seattle arrived on board the Admiral Watson on February 7. Acceding to pressure, Governor Bone authorized half to be delivered by plane. On February 8, the first half of the second shipment began its trip by dog sled, while the plane failed to start when a broken radiator shutter caused the engine to overheat. The plane failed the next day as well, and the mission was scrapped. Thompson was gracious in his editorials.

The second relay included many of the same drivers, and also faced harsh conditions. Ed Rohn delivered the serum to Nome during another blizzard after a 90 miles (140 km) run on February 15.

== Aftermath ==
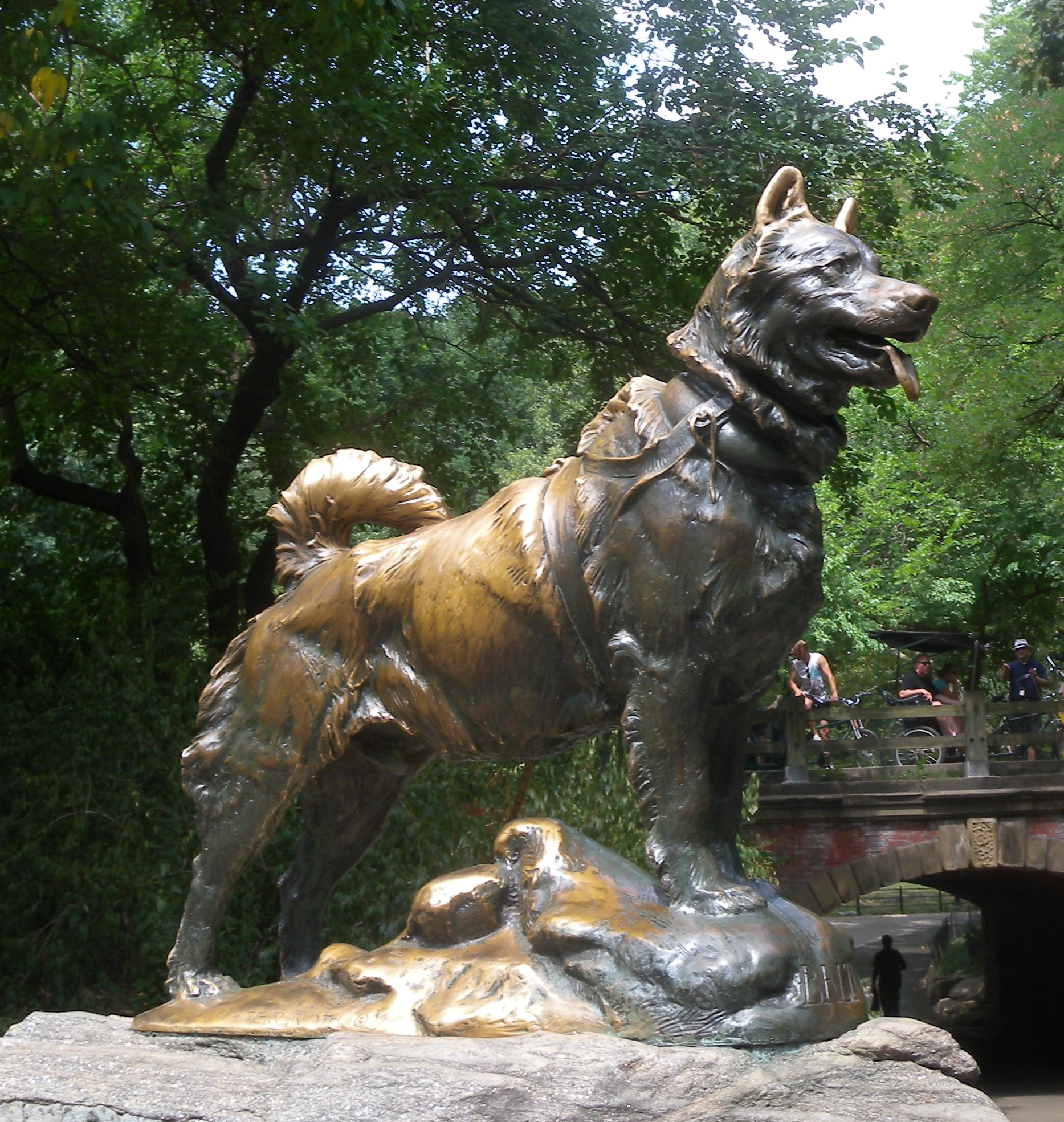
Statue of Balto, lead dog on the last relay team. The statue is located in Central Park (NYC) and is dedicated to all the dogs involved in the serum run.

The death toll from diphtheria in Nome is officially listed as either 5, 6, or 7, but Welch later estimated there were probably at least 100 additional cases among "the Eskimo camps outside the city. The Natives have a habit of burying their children without reporting the death." Forty-three new cases were diagnosed in 1926, but they were easily managed with the fresh supply of serum.

All participants in the dogsleds received letters of commendation from President Calvin Coolidge, and the Senate stopped work to recognize the event. Each musher during the first relay received a gold medal from the H. K. Mulford Company. The mayor of Los Angeles presented a bone-shaped key to the city to Balto in front of City Hall and silent-film actress Mary Pickford put a wreath around the canine's neck. Poems and letters from children poured in, and spontaneous fundraising campaigns sprang up around the country.

Gunnar Kaasen and his team became celebrities and toured the West Coast from February 1925 to February 1926, and also starred in a 30-minute film entitled Balto's Race to Nome. A statue of Balto by sculptor Frederick Roth was unveiled in New York City's Central Park during a visit on December 15, 1925. Balto and the other dogs later became part of a sideshow and lived in horrible conditions until they were rescued by George Kimble, who organized a fundraising campaign by the children of Cleveland, Ohio. On March 19, 1927, the dogs received a hero's welcome as they arrived at their permanent home at the Cleveland Zoo. Because of his age, Balto was euthanized on March 14, 1933, at the age of 14. He was mounted and placed on display in the Cleveland Museum of Natural History.

In October 1926, Seppala took Togo and his team on a tour from Seattle to California, and then across the Midwest to New England, and consistently drew huge crowds. They were featured at Madison Square Garden in New York City for 10 days, and Togo received a gold medal from Roald Amundsen. In New England, Seppala's team of Siberians ran in many races, easily defeating the local Chinooks of Arthur Walden. Seppala entered into a partnership with Elizabeth M. Ricker in Poland Spring, Maine, where many of his dogs went to live in retirement and contribute to their breeding program of Siberian sled dogs, including Togo, who sired many litters.

Seppala visited Togo, and was by his side when he was euthanized on December 5, 1929, at the age of 16. After his death, Seppala had Togo preserved and mounted, and today the dog is on display in a glass case at the Iditarod museum in Wasilla, Alaska. Togo's prowess as a sled dog also led to his strengths being preserved through breeding, with his descendants contributing to the "Seppala Siberian Sleddog", a sought after working sled dog line, as well as the mainstream show-stock Siberian Husky gene pool.

None of the other mushers received the same degree of attention, though Wild Bill Shannon briefly toured with Blackie. The media largely ignored the Alaska Native mushers, who covered two-thirds of the distance to Nome. According to Edgar Kalland, "it was just an everyday occurrence as far as we were concerned."

=== Air mail ===
The serum race helped spur the Air Mail Act of 1925, which was signed into law on February 2. The bill allowed private aviation companies to bid on mail delivery contracts. Technology improved and, within a decade, air mail routes were established in Alaska. The last mail delivery by private dog sled under contract took place in 1938, and the last U.S. Post Office dog sled route closed in 1963. Dog sledding remained popular in the rural interior but became nearly extinct when snowmobiles spread in the 1960s. Mushing was revitalized as a recreational sport in the 1970s with the immense popularity of the Iditarod Trail Sled Dog Race.

While the Iditarod Trail Sled Dog Race, which runs more than 1,000 miles (1,600 km) from Anchorage to Nome, is based on the All-Alaska Sweepstakes, it has many traditions that commemorate the race to deliver the serum to Nome, especially Seppala and Togo. The honorary musher for the first seven races was Leonhard Seppala. Other serum run participants, including "Wild Bill" Shannon, Edgar Kalland, Bill McCarty, Charlie Evans, Edgar Nollner, Harry Pitka, and Henry Ivanoff have also been honored. The 2005 Iditarod honored Jirdes Winther Baxter, the last known survivor of the epidemic. The position is now known as Leonhard Seppala's Honorary Musher, the Leonhard Seppala Humanitarian Award is given to the musher who provides the best dog care while remaining competitive, and the Leonhard Seppala Heritage Grant is an Iditarod scholarship. The two races follow the same route from Ruby to Nome.

A reenactment of the serum run was held in 1975, which took six days longer than the 1925 serum run, or more than twice the total time. Many of the participants were descendants of the original 20. In 1985, President Ronald Reagan sent a letter of recognition to Charlie Evans, Edgar Nollner, and Bill McCarty, the only remaining survivors. Nollner was the last to die, on January 18, 1999, of a heart attack.

=== Popular media ===
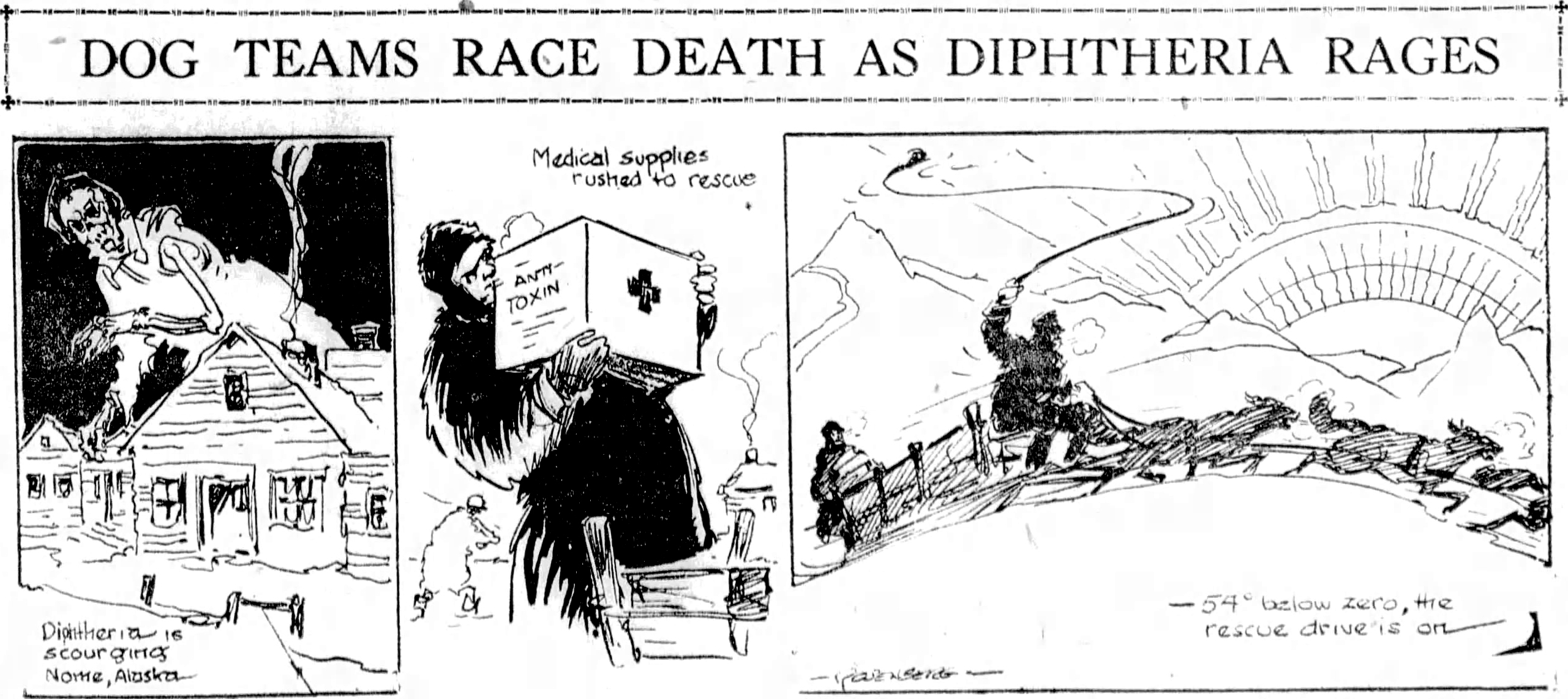
This depiction ran in papers in 1925.

The relay has been depicted in various media. Shortly before World War II, Czech teacher and writer František Omelka was fascinated by the story, writing the novella Štafeta ("Relay") published in Czech in 1946. As an avid Esperantist, Omelka himself translated it into Esperanto, with subsequent translations into German, Dutch, Frisian, Icelandic, Chinese, Japanese, and English.

The serum run was featured in the 1949 animated short "Daffy Duck Hunt", where Daffy Duck describes his time in a freezer as though he were delivering serum on a dog sled.

In 1976, the story was retold in Race Against Death: A True Story of the Far North, by children's author Seymour Reit. Reit's book was featured in a 1978 episode of The Book Bird, a PBS program where host John Robbins illustrated key scenes from the book being discussed.

The 1995 2D hand-drawn animated film Balto with music composed by James Roy Horner was loosely based on the events of the final leg of the serum run, although all of the characters besides Balto are fictional for family and children entertainments. A detailed recounting of the people and events involved in the serum run, including the story of the native mushers and the local nurses who attended to the sick and dying, is included in the 2003 book, The Cruelest Miles: The Heroic Story of Dogs and Men in a Race Against an Epidemic, by Gay and Laney Salisbury. In 2013, a documentary titled Icebound – The Greatest Dog Story Ever Told, focused on the aftermath of the events. The Great Alaskan Race, a 2019 film, produced by Rebel Road Entertainment, is based on the serum run. Togo, produced by Walt Disney Pictures, debuted on December 20, 2019, on Disney+.

== Sled dog credit ==
There is much controversy surrounding Balto's role in the serum run and the statue in Central Park. A premier musher, Seppala ran 170 miles (270 km) east from Nome to just outside Shaktoolik, where he met the serum runner (to his surprise, since he had anticipated having to go all the way to Nulato and back alone), took the handoff, and returned another 91 miles (146 km), having run over 261 miles (420 km) across some of the most dangerous and treacherous parts of the run in total. He then handed the serum off to Charlie Olson. Olson carried it 25 miles (40 km) to Bluff where he turned it over to Gunnar Kaasen. Kaasen was supposed to hand off the serum to Rohn at Port Safety, but Rohn had gone to sleep and Kaasen decided to keep going to Nome.

In all, Kaasen and Balto ran a total of 53 miles (85 km). Kaasen maintained that he decided to continue since there were no lights on in the cabin where Rohn was sleeping and he did not want to waste time, but many, including Rohn based on conversations the two men had before leaving Nome, and other decorated mushers in the surrounding area, thought his decision to not wake Rohn was motivated by a desire to grab the glory for himself and Balto.

According to Togo's musher, Leonhard Seppala, who was also Balto's owner, Balto was a scrub freight dog that he left behind when he set out on the trip. He also asserted that Kaasen's lead dog was actually a dog named Fox, but that news agents of the time thought that Balto was a more newsworthy name. No record exists of Seppala ever having used Balto as a leader in runs or races prior to 1925, and Seppala himself stated Balto "was never in a winning team". Because the pictures and video of Kaasen and Balto taken in Nome were recreated hours after their arrival once the sun had risen, speculation still exists as to whether Balto's position as lead dog was genuine, or was staged or exaggerated for media purposes.

The Central Park statue of Balto was modeled after Balto, but shows him wearing Togo's colors (awards). The inscription reads, "Dedicated to the indomitable spirit of the sled dogs that relayed antitoxin 600 miles over rough ice, across treacherous waters, through arctic blizzards, from Nenana to the relief of stricken Nome." In the last years of his life, Seppala was heartbroken by the way the credit had gone to Balto; in his mind, Togo was the real hero of the serum race. According to the National Park Service, in 1960 Seppala said:

I never had a better dog than Togo. His stamina, loyalty, and intelligence could not be improved upon. Togo was the best dog that ever traveled the Alaska trail.

Katy Steinmetz, writing in Time magazine, also thought that Togo was the greatest sled dog of all time. In the serum run, she wrote, Togo was the real hero:

... the dog that often gets credit for eventually saving the town is Balto, but he just happened to run the last, 55 miles [89 km] leg in the race. The sled dog who did the lion's share of the work was Togo. His journey, fraught with white-out storms, was the longest by 200 miles [320 km] and included a traverse across perilous Norton Sound – where he saved his team and driver in a courageous swim through ice floes.

== Relay participants and distances ==
Mushers (in order) and the distances they covered. Most legs were planned to be about 25 miles (40 km) long, generally accepted as an "extreme day's mush".

Start	Musher	Leg	Distance
January 27	"Wild" Bill Shannon	Nenana to Minto to Tolovana; Team of 9 huskies. Around 11:00 pm January 27, 1925, Shannon received the serum and written instructions from the conductor. Temperatures ranged from −40 to −62 °F (−40 to −52 °C). At 3:00 am, Shannon arrived in Campbell's Roadhouse in Minto, rested for four hours before setting off again, this time with only 6 dogs as three of his dogs, Cub, Jack and Jet, had been injured from the cold. Later, these three dogs ended up dying from lung injuries. Shannon suffered severe facial frostbite.	52 mi (84 km)
January 28	Dan Green	Tolovana to Manley Hot Springs; Temperatures warming to −30 °F (−34 °C), but a 20 mph wind	31 mi (50 km)
January 28	Johnny Folger	Manley Hot Springs to Fish Lake; Made run at night and is reported to have made 'good time'. Folger was an Athabascan Native. Met Sam Joseph and his team at a Fish Lake cabin.	28 mi (45 km)
January 28	Sam Joseph	Fish Lake to Tanana; A Tanana tribe Native, 35 years old, with a team of 7 Alaskan Malamutes. Recorded Tanana temperature was −38 °F (−39 °C). Covered trail in 2 hours 45 minutes, averaging better than 9 mph. Met by his family and Titus Nickolai.	26 mi (42 km)
January 29	Titus Nikolai	Tanana to Kallands; An Athabascan Native, no information regarding Titus's team, time, or travel along the trail. Met Dave Corning at Kallands.	34 mi (55 km)
January 29	Dave Corning	Kallands to Nine Mile Cabin; Reported to have averaged 8 mph for the 24 miles. Again no mention of exact times or the team. Met by Edgar Kalland at Nine Mile Cabin.	24 mi (39 km)
January 29	Edgar Kalland	Nine Mile Cabin to Kokrines; A musher for the U.S. mail service. Met by Harry Pitka at Kokrines.	30 mi (48 km)
January 29	Harry Pitka	Kokrines to Ruby; Seven dogs with trail in good condition. Night run with speeds averaging greater than 9 mph.	30 mi (48 km)
January 29	Bill McCarty	Ruby to Whiskey Creek; Lead dog: Prince. Severe hour-long snow storm. Arrived at Whiskey Creek about 10:00 am Temperature −40 °F (−40 °C). Met by Edgar Nollner.	28 mi (45 km)
January 29	Edgar Nollner	Whiskey Creek to Galena; Lead dog: 8 year-old Dixie. Nollner, a 21-year-old from Galena, mushed 7 malamutes and was met by his brother George.	24 mi (39 km)
January 30	George Nollner	Galena to Bishop Mountain; Newlywed George appears to have made the trip using the same team Edgar used to cover the previous 24 miles.	18 mi (29 km)
January 30	Charlie Evans	Bishop Mountain to Nulato; Half Athabascan Native, Evans, 21 years old, left Bishops Mountain at 5:00 am with a reported temperature of −64 °F (−53 °C). Arrived at Nulato at 10 am covering 30 miles in 5 hours running a 9 dog team. Two borrowed dogs suffered frozen groins on the trip.	30 mi (48 km)
January 30	Tommy "Patsy" Patson	Nulato to Kaltag; Patson, a Koyukuk Native, also a mail carrier, ran a fairly straight trail, setting the fastest speed recorded during the Serum Race, covering 36 miles in 3 1/2 hours at an average speed of more than 10 mph.	36 mi (58 km)
January 30	Jack "Jackscrew" Madros	Kaltag to Old Woman Shelter; An Alaskan Athabaskan, Jackscrew was a small man known for his unusual strength. During his partial night run, he jogged to lighten the sled until passing the Kaltag Divide, then a downhill trail toward Norton Sound. He arrived at Old Woman Cabin at 9:10 pm Friday evening, averaging almost 6 mph for 40 miles of difficult trail.	40 mi (64 km)
January 30	Victor Anagick	Old Woman Shelter to Unalakleet; Anagick, an Inuk Native, was sent from Unalakleet with an 11 dog team. He covered the 34 mile trail in 6 hours arriving at 3:30 am Saturday. The serum was now 207 miles from Nome.	34 mi (55 km)
January 31	Myles Gonangnan	Ran from Unalakleet to Shaktoolik with a team of 8 malamutes	40 mi (64 km)
January 31	Henry Ivanoff	Shaktoolik to just outside Shaktoolik; Part Russian Inuk, Ivanoff started toward Golovin. About a half mile out of Shaktoolik, he had to settle a fight in his team. While he was stopped he saw Seppala's Siberian Husky team approaching from the other direction. He passed the serum to Seppala a short distance out of town.	0.5 mi (0.8 km)
January 31	Leonhard Seppala	Just outside Shaktoolik to Ungalik to Isaac's Point to Golovin; Lead dogs: Togo and Fritz, team of 20 Siberian Huskies, some of which he dropped off in pairs at various roadhouses to be used as reinforcements for tired teams on the return trip. Forty-eight-year-old Seppala, with his chosen team of his 20 best dogs, had left Nome with the intent of intercepting the serum at Nulato, unaware that the relays had been faster. Leaving Isaac's Point on the north side of Norton Bay that morning, he traveled the 43 miles to just outside Shaktoolik, meeting Ivanoff. He turned his team around into the wind with a temperature of −30 °F (−34 °C) and darkness. Seppala risked the 20 mile sea ice crossing between Cape Denbigh and Point Dexter in a blinding blizzard. Togo's sense of smell permitted them to stay on course and got them to their stopping point on the North shore of Norton Bay, at an Eskimo sod igloo. Seppala fed the dogs and warmed the serum, hoping the blizzard would lessen. Early Sunday morning with −30 °F (−34 °C) temperatures, deadly winds, and the storm not lessening, he reached Dexter's Roadhouse at Golovin with completely exhausted dogs. The serum was now 78 miles from Nome. (Seppala traveled 91 miles with the serum, but also drove 170 miles from Nome to Shaktoolik to meet the serum for the turnaround of the relay; this makes his total miles covered 261 miles, the longest distance in the run by over 200 miles. On one day he covered 84 miles in a single drive.)	91 mi (146 km)
February 1	Charlie Olson	Golovin to Bluff; Lead dog: Jack, team of 7 Alaskan Malamutes. Olsen had left Gunnar Kaasen at the Olson Roadhouse and traveled to Golovin to await the serum. He left Golovin at 3:15 Sunday afternoon with temperatures of −30 °F (−34 °C) with an estimated 40 mph wind. He was hit by gusts that drove him and the team off the trail. Because of the severe wind chill, Olsen stopped, putting blankets on each dog. Two dogs suffered badly frozen groins. He arrived at Olson's Roadhouse at about 7:30 pm, surprising Gunnar Kaasen who thought Olsen might have stopped to wait out the storm.	25 mi (40 km)
February 1	Gunnar Kaasen	Bluff to Safety to Nome; Lead dogs: Balto and Fox. Forty-two-year-old Kaasen and his team of 13 of Leonhard Seppala's backup dogs were sent from Nome to Bluff to await the serum, while Ed Rohn was sent to Pt. Safety. With chest-deep snow drifts and glare ice, he was unable to see the trail and relied on Balto to guide the sled. A message was sent to the village of Solomon instructing Kaasen to wait out the storm there. Due to the severity of the storm, Kaasen missed the village as Balto kept them on the main trail passing to the south. While crossing Bonanza flat the sled was flipped by the wind, ejecting the serum. After searching in the dark on hands and knees, Kaasen found the package and continued. He arrived at Safety sometime after 2:00 am Sunday. Musher Ed Rohn, who was supposed to take the serum the final leg into Nome, was asleep expecting Kaasen to be held up waiting out the blizzard. Kaasen, deciding not to wake Rohn and knowing the time it would take to prepare the dogs and sled for travel, began the final 21 mile leg. He arrived in Nome around 5:30 am for a total time of seven and a half hours.	53 mi (85 km)

== Sources ==
- Page, Dorothy G. (1992). Polar Pilot. Danville, IL: Interstate Publishers. ISBN 0-8134-2936-6.
