= Togo (film) =

2019 film by Ericson Core

- Official release poster
- Directed by: Ericson Core
- Written by: Tom Flynn
- Produced by: Kim Zubick
- Starring: Willem Dafoe
- Cinematography: Ericson Core
- Edited by: Martin Pensa
- Music by: Mark Isham
- Production company: Walt Disney Pictures
- Distributed by: Walt Disney Studios; Motion Pictures
- Release date: December 20, 2019
- Running time: 114 minutes
- Country: United States
- Language: English
- Budget: $40 million

Togo is a 2019 American historical adventure film directed by Ericson Core and produced by Walt Disney Pictures. The film centers on Leonhard Seppala and his titular sled dog in the 1925 serum run to Nome to transport diphtheria antitoxin serum through harsh conditions during an epidemic of diphtheria. The film stars Willem Dafoe, Julianne Nicholson, Christopher Heyerdahl, Michael Gaston, Michael McElhatton, Jamie McShane, Michael Greyeyes, Thorbjørn Harr, Shaun Benson, and Nikolai Nikolaeff. It was released on Disney+ on December 20, 2019. The movie received generally positive reviews from critics.

== Plot ==
The film flashes between musher Leonhard Seppala raising his dog Togo and the 1925 serum run to Nome.

In 1913, Seppala and his wife Constance welcome a newborn Siberian Husky puppy to their sledding dog pack in Nome, Alaska. While Seppala insists on immediately retiring him due to his small and weak state, Constance is strongly supportive of the puppy. The young dog turns out to be close to unmanageable, and refuses to stay at home when the other dogs are working. He constantly escapes when left in the kennel, and seeks out Seppala's dog team, causing great disruption to Seppala's training routine. After trying to get rid of the Husky twice, the young dog escapes by crashing through a window pane and again returns to find the other dogs training. Seppala gives up and allows him to run with the others where, to his astonishment, he discovers that he is energetic enough to outrun the other dogs, and a natural leader of the dog team. He realizes the puppy has the potential to be a future champion. He decides to call him Togo, after another underdog, Japanese admiral Tōgō Heihachirō. He fully trains Togo to the point where he successfully wins the All Alaska Sweepstakes, earning both Togo and himself some local fame.

In 1925, a diphtheria outbreak occurs in Nome; mostly affecting children. Mayor George Maynard plans to have the serum flown in from Nenana, but this proves to be impossible due to the severity of the weather. A meeting by town officials hears that air delivery is impossible due to the weather, and concludes that only Seppala has the skill to drive the 600-mile (970 km) journey in such weather to collect the antitoxin. Eventually, Seppala is convinced to collect the serum and race back, and decides to take Togo despite the dog's age (Togo is 12, which is old for a dog). Constance becomes concerned and says the journey will kill the dog, but Seppala insists on going, and tells her that without Togo leading the team, he himself would be unlikely to survive. Seppala and his team tread through stormy weather and take a break at an outpost where a local doctor named Atiqtalik tells him that Togo is tired. Seppala continues on for miles; taking a dangerous shortcut across the melting Norton Sound to save a day's sledding. In the meantime after he leaves, a relay effort is set up to bring the serum back, with different teams running an average of 31-mile (50 km) stretches each.

Seppala eventually meets up with a fellow musher, Henry Ivanov, who was bringing the serum to Nome as part of the relay, and is therefore able to leave back for Nome the next day. Seppala and his team head back across the Norton Sound again – a high-risk attempt to save time and strain on the dogs by taking a dangerous shortcut across the breaking ice. The team become stranded on a broken piece of ice near the shore, and he is forced to throw Togo to shore, where the dog pulls the entire ice floe to safety. The effort, and the ensuing run through the driving storm, exhausts Togo. Reaching Atiqtalik's outpost again, she tells him Togo is dying. All hope seems lost for the people of Nome, who turn on the lights and make vigils for the team in hopes of guiding them home.

Nevertheless, Seppala gets his team back to Joe Dexter's outpost as he, Togo and team recuperate. The serum is passed off to fellow musher Gunnar Kaasen who arrives back in Nome. A reporter, confusing him for being the sole musher, announces his dog Balto as the hero who saved Nome, disappointing Constance. Seppala returns to Nome later, where the entire town come to his house to celebrate Togo's success. Seppala later becomes upset when a cured girl named Sally asks if Togo is dying. Seppala intends to continue training his dogs without Togo (who gained a paw injury during the run), but despite age and injury, Togo refuses to stay housebound and chases down Seppala who welcomes him with open arms.

Over the next two years, Togo sires puppies of his own that prove to be famous in their own right, and contribute to the "Seppala Siberian" bloodline. Togo eventually dies in 1929 with Seppala continuing to train dogs. A title card at the end reveals that while Balto had received a statue in his honor in New York, Togo is remembered in Alaska for making the longest run and for being the true hero of Nome, and his offspring became prized by mushers worldwide for their sledding capabilities.

== Cast ==
- Willem Dafoe as Leonhard Seppala
- Diesel (Vashiral's Diesel Magic) as Togo
  - Riptide as an adolescent Togo
- Julianne Nicholson as Constance Seppala
- Christopher Heyerdahl as Mayor George Maynard
- Richard Dormer as Dr. Curtis Welch
- Adrien Dorval as Bill Clark
- Madeline Wickins as Sally Burdett
- Michael Greyeyes as Amituk
- Nive Nielsen as Atiqtalik
- Nikolai Nikolaeff as Dan Murphy
- Thorbjørn Harr as Charlie Olsen
- Catherine McGregor as Sarah Foley
- Michael McElhatton as Jafet Lindeberg
- Brandon Oakes as Henry Ivanoff
- Paul Piaskowski as Max Adams
- Michael Gaston as Joe Dexter
- Shaun Benson as Gunnar Kaasen
- Zahn McClarnon as Tulimak
- Jamie McShane as Scotty Allan
- Steven McCarthy as Dev Burdett

== Production ==
On October 28, 2015, it was announced that Walt Disney Pictures was developing a film about the 1925 serum run to Nome focusing on the sled dog Togo and his owner Leonhard Seppala. The screenplay was set to be written by Tom Flynn and the production was to be overseen by Jessica Virtue and Louie Provost for Disney.

On May 16, 2018, it was announced that Ericson Core would direct the film, that Kim Zubick would serve as a producer, and that the film would debut on Disney+. Additionally, it was further announced that Willem Dafoe would star in the film as Leonhard Seppala, the owner of Togo. On December 10, 2018, it was reported that Thorbjørn Harr had joined the cast of the film.

Principal photography for the film commenced on September 21, 2018, and finished in February 2019 in Cochrane, Alberta.

Most of the dogs featured in this film are from The Snowy Owl Sled Dog Tours Inc. kennel located in Canmore. Vashiral's Diesel Magic (Diesel), the main dog actor who plays Togo, is a Canadian Kennel Club (CKC) registered Siberian Husky from Newfoundland, Canada. He is a direct descendant of the real life Togo going back 14 generations. Hugo and Mackey from Snowy Owl were used throughout the movie as stunt doubles for the face of Togo, Diesel.

The film's visual effects were done by DNEG, Lola VFX, Soho and CoSA VFX.

== Historical accuracy ==
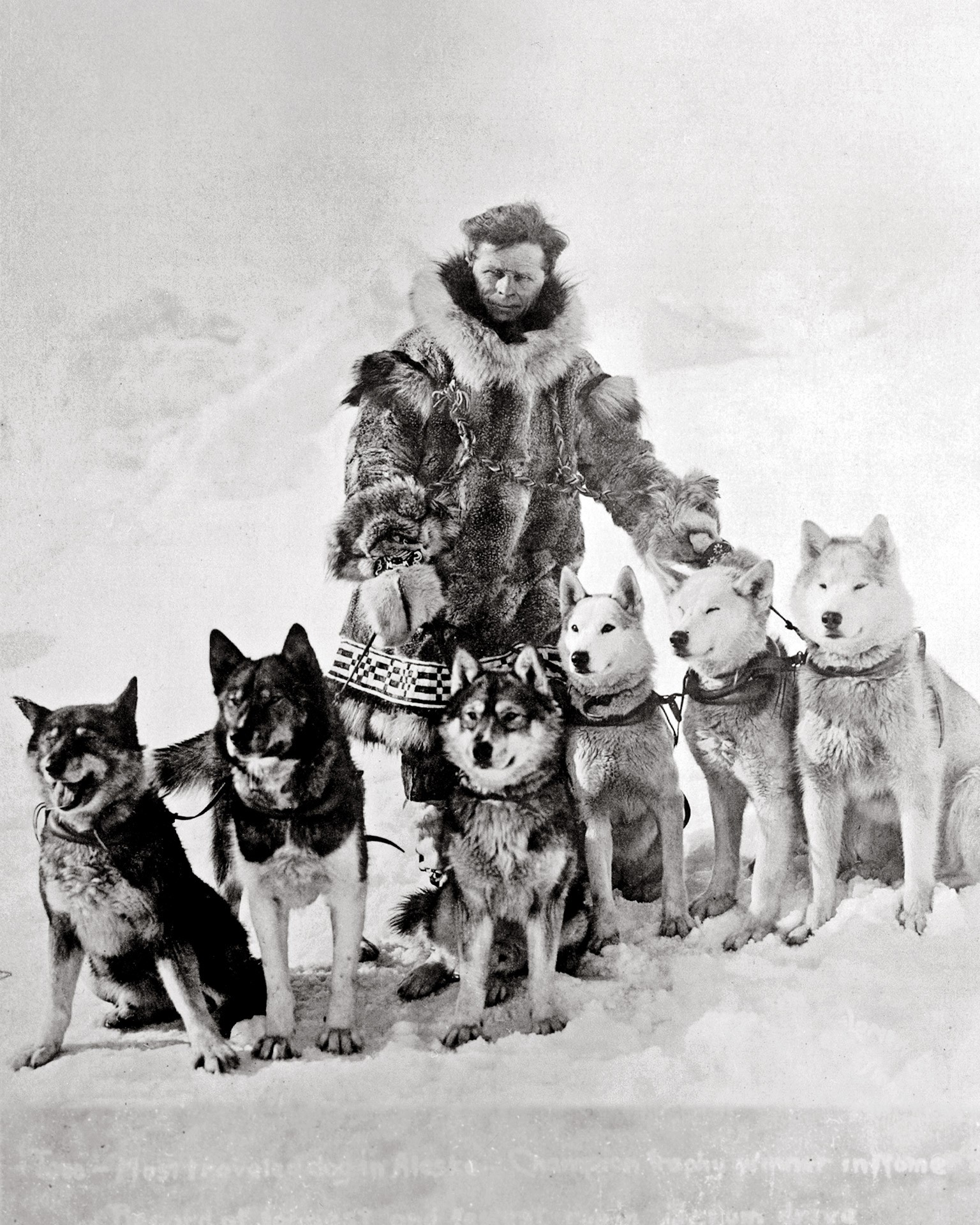
Leonhard Seppala with sled dogs from his kennel. From left to right, Togo, Karinsky, Jafet, Pete, unknown and Fritz, circa 1924–1925.

The movie, for the most part, remains faithful to the story of Leonhard Seppala and Togo. Two of the more "cinematic" moments in the film that were remarkably true to life include Togo escaping his second owner by jumping through a glass window and Togo using his strength to pull Seppala's sled out of the Norton Sound.

The movie, however, excludes Seppala and Constance's daughter Sigrid who was among the many children who was at risk of contracting diphtheria. Seppala's reaction to Balto getting the credit is not shown, though Constance is shown to be rather annoyed by the news.

In real life, Seppala openly voiced his disapproval of the dog hero mix-up. In addition, the film depicts Seppala's sled team as being composed of 11 dogs, with Togo as the only lead dog. In real life, Togo was sometimes assisted in leading by a half-brother named Fritz. Also, in the film, Gunnar Kaasen's team is composed of only 10 dogs. In real life, Kaasen's team consisted of 13 dogs. Also, Balto strongly resembles the way he looked in real life, except that he has blue eyes as opposed to the dark brown eyes that he had in real life.

The movie also depicts Togo living out the rest of his days with Seppala while in real life, Togo was given to a fellow musher named Elizabeth Ricker in Poland, Maine, to live out his golden years and sire pups. On parting with his best dog, Seppala stated, "It was sad parting on a cold, gray March morning, when Togo raised a small paw to my knee as if questioning why he was not going along with me. I never had a better dog than Togo. His stamina, loyalty, and intelligence could not be improved upon. Togo was the best dog that ever traveled the Alaska trail."

Seppala did visit Togo a couple of times and was by his side when he was euthanized. Togo was bred in order to preserve his traits as a sled dog, and sired pups that were a part of and contributed to the Seppala Siberian Sleddog lines, as well as the AKC and CKC registered Siberian Husky bloodlines.

== Release ==
Togo was originally scheduled to be released on Disney+ on December 13, 2019, but was eventually moved and released a week later on December 20, 2019. In 2024, it was removed from Disney+. In February 2026, the film became available on Tubi and Amazon Prime Video under the Wonder Project subscription channel, although it was later taken off from those services at the beginning of March. In November 2026, Togo became available through Wonder Project again.

== Reception ==
=== Critical response ===
On review aggregator website Rotten Tomatoes, the film holds an approval rating of 93% and an average rating of 7.50/10, based on 41 reviews. The website's critical consensus reads: "An endearing and exciting underdog story that benefits greatly from its stars (canine and human alike), Togo is a timeless tale, well-told." At Metacritic, the film has a weighted average score of 72 out of 100, based on 8 critics, indicating "generally favorable reviews".

David Reamer of Anchorage Daily News and Simon Ingram of National Geographic stated the film finally gives Togo his due. Jason Bailey of The New York Times praised Willem Dafoe's performance and his dynamic with Togo, found the set pieces very well executed, and wrote: "That’s a shame, as Ericson Core does right by his wide, open spaces, painting imposing pictures of snow-capped mountains and rolling vistas. A film of this scope will, presumably, lose something on an iPad." Karen Han of Polygon found Dafoe charismatic across the film, stated that Core manages to provide a high-standard render of the landscapes through the snow, and complimented the performances of the supporting cast.

Nick Allen of RogerEbert.com rated the movie 3 out of 4 stars, complimented Ericson Core for his filmmaking, and praised William Dafoe's performance, stating, "Togo is a smart, affectionately made tale about an underdog and his musher. [...] The movie is affectionate because it has that sense of animal love that lets entire sequences rest on Togo’s charms, but is by no means letting the dog do all the work." Matt Goldberg of Collider gave the movie a B+ rating, praised the emotion weight provided by the story, and complimented Dafoe's performance, writing, "There’s adventure and acts of heroism, but what makes Togo special is how it respects that unique bond between a dog and their person." Ian Freer of Empire gave the film 3 out of 5 stars, saying, "Togo is in a slightly more sombre register than Call Of The Wild but delivers similar sturdy pleasures; exciting dog-in-peril action and striking landscapes, all anchored by Dafoe’s grounded performance." Jennifer Green of Common Sense Media rated the film 3 out of 5 stars, acclaimed the movie for its depiction of positive messages, citing determination and courage, and applauded the presence of role models, calling Togo and Seppala loyal, hard-working and good-natured. Kate Erbland of IndieWire gave the movie a B rating, described the visual effects as impressive, praised Dafoe's performance, and found that the film provides an emotional weight, stating, "The film really hits hard when it leans more into the emotion of it all, from Togo’s incredibly adorable puppyhood. [...] The lingering possibility that Togo may have run his last haunts Leonhard (and will likely break a few young viewers’ hearts along the way), but it speaks to the film's grasp on serving up reality and truth, even when it hurts."

=== Accolades ===
Award	Date of ceremony	Category	Recipient(s)	Result	Ref.
Writers Guild of America Awards	February 1, 2020	Television: Original Long Form	Tom Flynn	Nominated	
Motion Picture Sound Editors	January 19, 2020	Outstanding Achievement in Sound Editing – Sound Effects, Foley, Music, Dialogue and ADR for Non-Theatrical Feature Film Broadcast Media	Odin Benitez, Todd Toon, Martyn Zub, Christopher Bonis, Luke Gibleon, Jason King, Adam Kopald, Walter Spencer, John C. Stuver, Dave McMoyler, Peter Oso Snell, Mike Horton, Tim McKeown	Won	
Gold Derby Awards	September 16, 2020	TV movie	Togo	Nominated	
