= The Great Alaskan Race =

- Film poster
- Directed by: Brian Presley
- Written by: Brian Presley
- Produced by: Brian Presley; Mark David; Will Wallace
- Starring: Brian Presley
- Cinematography: Mark David
- Edited by: Gabriel Ordonez; Mark David; Brian Presley
- Music by: John Koutselinis
- Production company: Rebel Road Entertainment
- Distributed by: P12 Films
- Release date: October 25, 2019
- Running time: 84 minutes 104 minutes
- Country: United States
- Language: English
- Box office: $721,736 USD

The Great Alaskan Race is a 2019 American action adventure drama film written and directed by Brian Presley.

== Synopsis ==
The film opens in 1917 Alaska with Leonhard Seppala winning the Sweepstakes Race for the third time in a row. Things change for Leonhard when his wife Kiana dies after giving birth to their daughter Sigrid, leaving everything up to him.

In 1925, in Nome, Alaska a child begins to cough during a ceremony in the village church. This passes without being noticed by Dr. Welch, but when other children start coughing as well, he realizes something is wrong and decides to visit some of them. When he realizes it's diphtheria, he immediately looks for the antitoxin, but in vain. Welch then decides to warn the mayor of the town and so a quarantine is triggered for the town.

All the neighboring towns try to send the serum to Nome, but the snowstorm prevents the planes from flying and the frozen sea does not allow the ships to leave. The mayor then calls all the mushers and tells them that in Nenana, the nearest town to Nome, they have the serum but that it will be necessary to create a transfer with which to get the antitoxin. Seppala initially doesn't want to leave, because Sigrid has only him in the world, but then Constance, one of the nurses at the hospital and a very important figure for Sigrid, convinces him to leave.

After an extreme effort, the antitoxin finally reaches Nome, but Leonhard has no more strength and is about to die. In a dream, he has a vision of Kiana who tells him not to give up and to return to his daughter. Leonhard wakes up in his bed at home, ready to start living his life again and spend it with Sigrid and Constance.

== Cast ==
- Brian Presley as Leonhard Seppala
- Treat Williams as Dr. Welch
- Bruce Davison as Governor Bone
- Henry Thomas as Thompson
- Brea Bee as Constance
- Emma Presley as Sigrid
- Brad Leland as Mayor Maynard
- James Russo as Wild Bill
- Nolan North as Harry Davenport
- Will Wallace as Gunnar Kaasen

== Historical accuracies between the film and actual events ==
In the film, Leonhard Seppala's wife and Sigrid's mother is an Inuk native woman named Kiana, whereas in reality, Seppala's wife and Sigrid's mother was really Constance. The film portrays Constance as the church director of the children's choir, one of the nurses in Nome's small hospital, and Dr. Curtis Welch's daughter, as well as becoming Seppala's second wife and Sigrid's stepmother at the end of the film. Kiana was a fictional character made up in the film.

Just as portrayed in the film, Leonhard Seppala and his friend Gunnar Kaasen both worked for the gold-mining company in Nome, as well as the fact that Seppala raised a large kennel of Siberian huskies on the sideline. Both the film and real events portray Togo as Leonhard's favorite lead dog.

Balto and Togo are portrayed differently in the film than in real life. In the film, Togo is a gray-and-white Siberian husky and Balto is a large black-and-white Alaskan Malamute. In reality, Togo was a mixture of black, gray, and brown in color, while Balto was a black Siberian husky with a white bib on his chest, a long white sock on his right leg, and a short white sock on his left leg.

In the film, only two children, two Inuit girls named Mary and Akina, died from the diphtheria epidemic before the antitoxin arrived. In reality, seven children died from diphtheria before the epidemic was lifted, including seven-year-old Alaskan Eskimo girl Margaret Eide, three-year-old Billy Barnett, and six-year-old Inuk native girl Bessie Stanley.

Just like in the film, the relay of 20 mushers and their sled dogs delivered 300,000 units of diphtheria antitoxin to Nome in six days. However, the antitoxin supply was a small amount and could only keep the epidemic at bay until a larger shipment arrived. What the film doesn't mention is that another 1,100,000 units of serum were gathered and shipped to Alaska, where a second relay of dog mushers and their teams picked it up and delivered it to Nome in another six days. The diphtheria epidemic was not immediately averted as is portrayed in the film, but it was lifted by February 15, 1925, four weeks after the epidemic had begun.

"Wild Bill" Shannon was the first musher in the first relay to pick up the serum in Nenana, but he did not arrive in Whiskey Creek as the film portrays. He passed the life-saving serum to Edgar Kalland in Tolovana after travelling more than 50 miles through a freezing Arctic storm and losing four of his nine sled dogs in the process. Edgar Kalland drove his team of sled dogs from Tolovana to Manley Hot Springs, where he passed the antitoxin off to the third musher in the relay, Dan Green. Charlie Evans, the twelfth musher in the relay, received the serum in Bishop Mountain from the previous musher George Nollner and carried it thirty miles down to Nulato, losing his two lead dogs in the process to the bitter cold.

Leonhard Seppala and Gunnar Kaasen did not meet the last fifty miles of the journey nor did Seppala pass the serum over to Kaasen. After carrying the life-saving serum more than ninety miles from Shaktoolik and crossing the treacherous Norton Sound, Seppala arrived in Ungalik and passed the antitoxin over to Charlie Olsen, who carried it twenty miles from Ungalik to Bluff. Charlie then passed the medicine over to Gunnar Kaasen, who carried it the last fifty-three miles from Bluff to Nome.

In the film, Leonhard Seppala's team of dogs consisted of seven dogs and Gunnar Kaasen's team numbered eight dogs. In reality, Seppala's team numbered twenty Siberian huskies with Togo as the lead dog and a second dog, Fritz, as co-leader alongside Togo. Kaasen's team numbered thirteen huskies from Seppala's kennel and his lead dogs were Balto and a brown-and-gray husky named Fox.

The film omitted two important events in Kaasen's and Balto's journey from Bluff to Nome. At the start of the journey, Kaasen's sled tipped over against the strong Arctic winds and dumped the serum into a deep drift of snow. Kaasen dug through the snow, retrieved the serum, and reattached it to the sled again before continuing on his way.

The second event occurred when Kaasen and his dog team arrived in Point Safety, where the serum was supposed to be handed over to the last musher of the relay, Ed Rohn. Ed Rohn, believing that Kaasen and his team had stopped at Solomon to wait out the blizzard, had fallen asleep and left his dogs unharnessed and locked up in the barn. Kaasen made the decision to continue on his journey to Nome, possibly aware of the acclaim that would greet the person who completed the final relay. At 5:30 am on February 1, he and his dogs arrived in Nome with the life-saving serum.

== Release ==
The film was released in theaters on October 25, 2019.

== Reception ==
Tara McNamara of Common Sense Media awarded the film two stars out of five. Bobby LePire of Film Threat gave it a five out of ten.

== See also ==
- Balto, film from 1995
- Togo, film from 2019
