= Henry McLemore =

American sports columnist (1906–1968)

Henry Tolliver McLemore (December 2, 1906 – June 23, 1968) was a sports columnist for the Hearst Newspapers organization. He portrayed himself in the 1940 Bing Crosby film Swing With Bing, was a 1956 contestant on Groucho Marx's television show You Bet Your Life, and had a walk-on in a 1955 episode of The Millionaire television drama.

McLemore began his career in the 1920s covering major stories such as New York's gambling wars, the Lindbergh kidnapping, national political conventions and White House conferences. He won the Headliner Award for his coverage of the New London School explosion, and worked for a time as sports editor of The Atlanta Georgian. In 1940 he joined the McNaught Syndicate and wrote a sports column published in 175 newspapers.

Today McLemore is most remembered for his support of Democrat President Franklin D. Roosevelt's policy of internment of Japanese-Americans in World War II, following the Japanese attack on Pearl Hearbor in December 1941. In one of several articles on the topic, McLemore said that Americans should have no patience "with the enemy or with anyone whose veins carry his blood."

McLemore died at age 61 of a heart attack on June 23, 1968, in Daytona Beach, Florida, where he worked as a publicist for the Daytona International Speedway.
