= Leonhard Seppala =

Norwegian-American sled dog breeder, trainer, and musher (1877–1967)

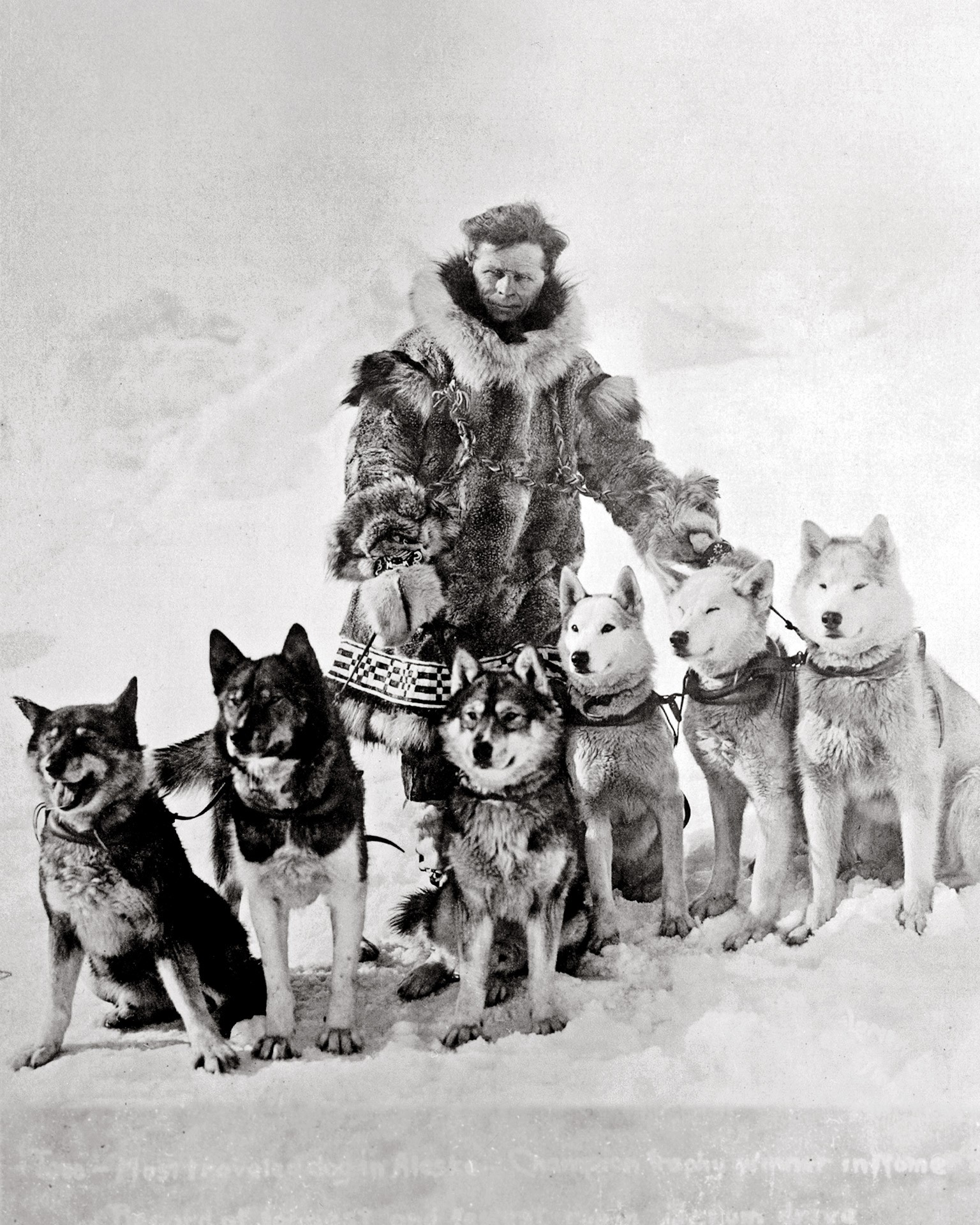
- Leonhard Seppala with his dogs after the serum run in 1925. Dogs from left to right – Togo, Karinsky, Jafet, Pete, Zeus, Fritz.
- Born: September 14, 1877; Lyngen, Troms, Norway
- Died: January 28, 1967 (aged 89); Seattle, Washington, U.S.
- Occupations: Sled dog breeder, racer
- Known for: 1925 serum run to Nome
- Spouse: Constance Seppala
- Children: 1 (Sigrid Seppala)

Leonhard "Sepp" Seppala (/ˈlɛnərd ˈsɛpələ/; September 14, 1877 – January 28, 1967) was a Norwegian-Kven-American sled dog breeder, trainer and musher who with his dogs played a pivotal role in the 1925 serum run to Nome, and participated in the 1932 Winter Olympics. Seppala introduced the work dogs used by Native Siberians at the time to the American public. The breed came to be known as the Siberian Husky in the English-speaking world. The Leonhard Seppala Humanitarian Award, which honors excellence in sled dog care, is named in honour of him.

== Background ==
Seppala was born in Lyngen Municipality in Troms county, Northern Norway. He was the eldest child of Isak Isaksen Seppälä, a Tornedalian, born in Sweden, and Anne Henrikke Henriksdatter. His father's family name is of Finnish origin. Seppälä comes from the Finnish word seppä, meaning smith. Leonhard is considered to have been Kven. When Seppala was two years old, his family moved within Troms county to the nearby island of Skjervøya in Skjervøy Municipality.

While in Skjervøy, his father worked as a blacksmith and fisherman, building up a relatively large estate. Seppala initially followed in his father's footsteps as both a blacksmith and a fisherman. In 1900, he emigrated to Alaska during the Nome gold rush. His friend Jafet Lindeberg had returned from Alaska and convinced Seppala to come to work for his mining company in Nome. He became a naturalized citizen in 1906.

During his first winter in Alaska, Seppala became a dogsled driver for Lindeberg's company. He enjoyed the task from his first run, which he recalled clearly for the rest of his life. He expressed pleasure in the rhythmic patter of the dogs' feet and the feeling of the sled gliding along the snow. While most drivers considered 30 miles (48 km) a long run, Seppala travelled between 50 miles (80 km) and 100 miles (160 km) most days. This meant he worked as long as 12 hours a day. He kept his dogs in form during the summer by having them pull a cart on wheels instead of a sled. It was unusual at that time to keep sled dogs working when the snow thawed, or to spend as much time with them as he did.

== Racing career ==
In 1914, Seppala inherited his first team of sled dogs by chance. Lindeberg, his friend and supervisor at Pioneer Mining Company, had brought the puppies from Siberia as a gift for the explorer Roald Amundsen, whom he hoped would use them for his upcoming expedition to the North Pole. Seppala was assigned to train the dogs. "I literally fell in love with them from the start", he recalled; "I could hardly wait for sledding snow to start their training". When Amundsen cancelled his trip a few weeks after the puppies arrived in Nome, Lindeberg gave them to Seppala.

Seppala made the decision to compete in his first race, the 1914 All Alaska Sweepstakes, at the last minute. Neither he nor his canine freight leader, Suggen, knew the dangerous trail, and when a blizzard suddenly descended on the area during the race, Seppala realized his young dogs had lost the trail and they were all at great risk of death due to the nearby drop-off to the Bering Sea. When the whiteout conditions suddenly lifted, Seppala found that he and his team were at the bottom of a hill, racing towards the cliffs along the sea.

He succeeded in stopping 20 feet from the drop-off, saving all their lives. However, many of his dogs' paw pads had been shredded and claws broken by the ice-encrusted snow as they clawed their way back to the top of the hill. A few also suffered frostbite. Seppala felt he had abused the dogs' loyalty by putting them in danger of death and injury, and withdrew from the race in shame. He nursed them back to health for most of the remainder of that year. They were not ready to train again until autumn.

Seppala's racing career took off the following year, at the 1915 All Alaska Sweepstakes. After a close competition between him and experienced musher Scotty Allan, Seppala defeated him on the fourth day of the race and finished two hours ahead of Allan to win the Sweepstakes. He went on to win the race the following two years, as well, at which point the All Alaska Sweepstakes was suspended until 1983.

== Role in the "Great Race of Mercy" of 1925 ==
A diphtheria outbreak struck Seppala's town of Nome, Alaska in the winter of 1925. Previously unexposed children as well as adults were at risk of dying from the infection. Seppala's only child—an eight-year-old daughter named Sigrid—was also at risk. The only treatment available in 1925 was diphtheria antitoxin serum. However, the town's supply was insufficient and of presumably low efficacy, being past its expiry date. Without the antitoxin, estimated mortality rates stood anywhere from 75% to 99.99%, practically a killing blow to Nome. The only practical way to deliver more serum to Nome in the middle of the coldest winter in 20 years was by dog sled. A relay of respected mushers was organized to expedite the delivery, and Seppala, with lead dog Togo, was chosen for the most forbidding part of the trail.

The serum was to be taken by train to Nenana, and from there relay teams would set out from Nome and Nenana, meeting in the middle at Nulato. The whole trail was 674 miles from Nenana to Nome, and Seppala was initially selected to cover the more than 400 miles from Nome to Nulato and back. Seppala's section of trail featured a dangerous shortcut across Norton Sound, which could save a full day of travel. It was decided that he was the most qualified of the relay mushers to attempt this shortcut. The ice on Norton Sound was in constant motion due to currents from the sea and the incessant wind. It ranged from rough hills of smashed-together ice to slippery "glare ice" polished by the wind, where it was difficult for the dogs to get a foothold.

Small cracks in the ice could suddenly widen, and driver and team could be plunged into the freezing water. If the wind blew from the east, it could reach speeds as high as 110 mph (180 km/h), flipping over sleds, pushing dogs off course, and causing a windchill as low as −116.5 °F (−82.5 °C)(windchill is the loss of body heat induced by temps of 25 °F (−4 °C) and at least 1 mph (1.6 km/h) winds). A sustained east wind could also push the ice out to sea, and a team caught on a drifting floe could find itself stranded on open water. Seppala had taken the shortcut across the Sound several times in his career. A less-experienced musher was likelier to lose his life and the lives of his dogs, and the urgently needed serum. Seppala crossed the sound each way in the race to deliver the serum.

Seppala set out from Nome on January 28—several days before he was due to meet the relay coming to Nulato. He crossed Norton Sound without incident. Meanwhile, the number of diphtheria cases in Nome continued to climb. To hasten delivery of the serum, more mushers were added to the relay. However, it was too late to inform Seppala that he would be meeting the relay closer to Nome than had originally been planned. After 3 days and 170 miles (270 km), he came in sight of another relay musher, Henry Ivanoff, but did not realise it. Seppala saw the musher stopped on the trail and having trouble with his dogs, but did not intend to stop and be delayed. Ivanoff had to run after Seppala as he raced past, shouting, "The serum! The serum! I have it here!".

When the serum passed to Seppala, night was falling and a powerful low-pressure system was moving towards the trail from the Gulf of Alaska. Seppala had to decide whether to risk Norton Sound in high winds in the dark, when he could not see or hear potential warning signs from the ice. As going around the ice meant slowing the delivery of the serum by a full day, he chose to go across. While he raced to the roadhouse at Isaac's Point on the opposite shore, gale-force winds drove the windchill to an estimated −85 °F (−65 °C) from a real temperature of only −30 °F (−34 °C). When he arrived there at 8 pm, his dogs were exhausted. They had run 84 miles (135 km) that day, much of it against the wind and in brutal cold. They could only afford a short rest, and set out again at 2 am.

The next day, the gale had intensified into a severe blizzard, with blinding snow and winds of at least 65 mph (105 km/h). Seppala continued the trail across Norton Sound. This meant avoiding rocky cliffs along the shore, but it also exposed him and his team to the dangers of the Sound. Conditions on the ice were perilous, with sudden soft spots in the ice underfoot and outright open water sometimes only a few feet away. Only a few hours after they had crossed it, the ice broke up altogether and drifted out to sea.

With Norton Sound behind them, Seppala and his team now faced the final challenge of the trail—climbing an 8-mile (13 km) ridge formation that led to the summit of Little McKinley. The trail here was exposed and the steep grade grueling for the dogs, who were sleep-deprived and had already raced 260 miles (420 km) over the previous 4.5 days. At 3 P.M. that day, Seppala and his team arrived at Golovin and handed over the serum to the next musher. The serum was now only 78 miles (126 km) from Nome. It arrived there the next day, Monday, February 2, at approximately 5:30 A.M., and was thawed and ready for use by 11 am.

This emergency delivery, also known as the "Great Race of Mercy", is commemorated annually with the Iditarod Trail Sled Dog Race.

== After the Serum Run ==
After the Serum Run, Seppala and some 40 of his dogs toured the "lower 48" with an Eskimo handler. His tour ended in January 1927 with the dogsled race at Poland Spring, Maine, where he accepted the challenge to race against Arthur Walden, founder of the New England Sled Dog Club and owner of the famous lead dog, "Chinook". Despite a series of time-consuming mishaps on the trail, Seppala won the race against the bigger, slower dogs driven by Walden and his followers.

The enthusiasm for sled dog racing in New England together with the Serum Run publicity and the victory over Walden made it possible for Seppala and partner Elizabeth Ricker to establish a Siberian kennel at Poland Spring. This was the start of the spread of the Siberian Husky breed in the United States and Canada. He bred Togo, and the dog's descendants contributed to the "Seppala Siberian Sleddog", a sought after sled dog line, as well as mainstream show-stock Siberian Husky lines bred in New England and eventually elsewhere.

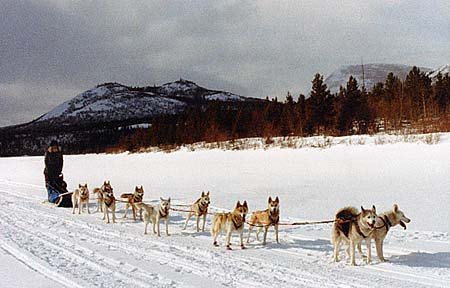
A team of 10 Seppala Siberian Sleddogs in the Yukon in 1994

In 1928, Seppala moved his permanent home to near Fairbanks, Alaska. In 1931 the Seppala–Ricker partnership ended. Sled dog racing was a demonstration event at the Lake Placid Winter Olympic Games in 1932, where Seppala earned a silver in the event. In 1946, he and his wife Constance moved to Seattle, Washington.

In 1961, Seppala revisited Fairbanks and other places in Alaska at the invitation of American journalist Lowell Thomas, enjoying a warm reception from the Alaskan people. He and his wife lived in Seattle until his death at the age of 89. His wife, Constance, died a few years later aged 85. Both are buried in Nome, Alaska. They were survived by their daughter, Sigrid Hanks.

Seppala's ashes were scattered in the 1966 Iditarod as part of Alaska Centennial celebrations.

A street in Nome named Seppala Drive connects the town to its airport. Alaska Airlines has established the Leonhard Seppala Humanitarian Award. In June 1999, a memorial was erected to him in Skibotn, Norway. In 2019, Disney released a movie based on Seppala's feats in the 1925 serum run to Nome, titled Togo and starring Willem Dafoe as Seppala.

== Sources ==
- Beyer, Rick, The Greatest Stories Never Told (Harper, 2003) ISBN 0-06-001401-6
- Ricker, Elizabeth Miller, Seppala: Alaskan Dog Driver (Boston: Little, Brown, and Company. 1930)
