= List of films set in Alaska =

This is a list of films set in Alaska, whether in part or in full. This North American setting is part of the Northern genre. It includes movies in which location shooting occurred both inside Alaska and outside the state, on sound stages or snowy locations closer to Hollywood.

Following the main list is a list of films which were filmed in Alaska, but set elsewhere.

== Main list ==
- The Spoilers (1914)
- The White Raven (1917)
- Shark Monroe (1918)
- The Frozen North (1922)
- The Spoilers (1923)
- The Call of the Wild (1923)
- The Soilers (1923)
- The Chechahcos (1924)
- Winds of Chance (1925)
- The Gold Rush (1925)
- The Trail of '98 (1928)
- The Spoilers (1930)
- The Silver Horde (1930)
- Klondike (1932)
- Tillie and Gus (1933)
- Call of the Wild (1935)
- Page Miss Glory (1935)
- Klondike Annie (1936)
- The Barrier (1937)
- Spawn of the North (1938)
- Call of the Yukon (1938)
- The Spoilers (1942)
- Jack London (1943)
- Belle of the Yukon (1944)
- Road to Utopia (1946)
- Jolson Sings Again (1949)
- The Thing from Another World (1951)
- Lost in Alaska (1952)
- Arctic Flight (1952)
- Red Snow (1952)
- The World in His Arms (1952)
- Back to God's Country (1953)
- Cry Vengeance (1954)
- The Far Country (1955)
- Top of the World (1955)
- The Spoilers (1955)
- Alaska Passage (1959)
- Ice Palace (1960)
- North to Alaska (1960)
- Challenge to Be Free (1975)
- Spirit of the Wind (1979)
- Sourdough (1982)
- Firefox (1982)
- Runaway Train (1985)
- White Fang (1991)
- Salmonberries (1991)
- On Deadly Ground (1994)
- Balto (1995)
- To Brave Alaska (1996)
- Alaska (1996)
- The Edge (1997)
- Avalanche (1999)
- Leaving Normal (1999)
- Limbo (1999)
- Mystery, Alaska (1999)
- Out Cold (2001)
- Balto II: Wolf Quest (2002)
- Insomnia (2002)
- Snow Dogs (2002)
- Brother Bear (2003)
- Balto III: Wings of Change (2004)
- The Big White (2005)
- Grizzly Man (2005)
- Brother Bear 2 (2006)
- The Guardian (2006)
- The Last Winter (2006)
- 30 Days of Night (2007)
- Into the Wild (2007)
- The Simpsons Movie (2007)
- Snow Buddies (2008)
- Dear Lemon Lima (2009)
- The Fourth Kind (2009)
- The Proposal (2009)
- Resident Evil: Afterlife (2010)
- On the Ice (2011)
- The Big Year (2011)
- Beyond (2012)
- The Grey (2012)
- Big Miracle (2012)
- The Bourne Legacy (2012)
- Pacific Rim (2013)
- The Frozen Ground (2013)
- Bears (2014)
- WildLike (2014)
- Sugar Mountain (2016)
- Hold the Dark (2018)
- Togo (film) (2019)
- The Call of the Wild (2020)

== Set elsewhere ==
- Eskimo (1933)
- Never Cry Wolf (1983)
- White Fang (1991)
