= Arthur H. Noyes =

American judge (1853–1915)

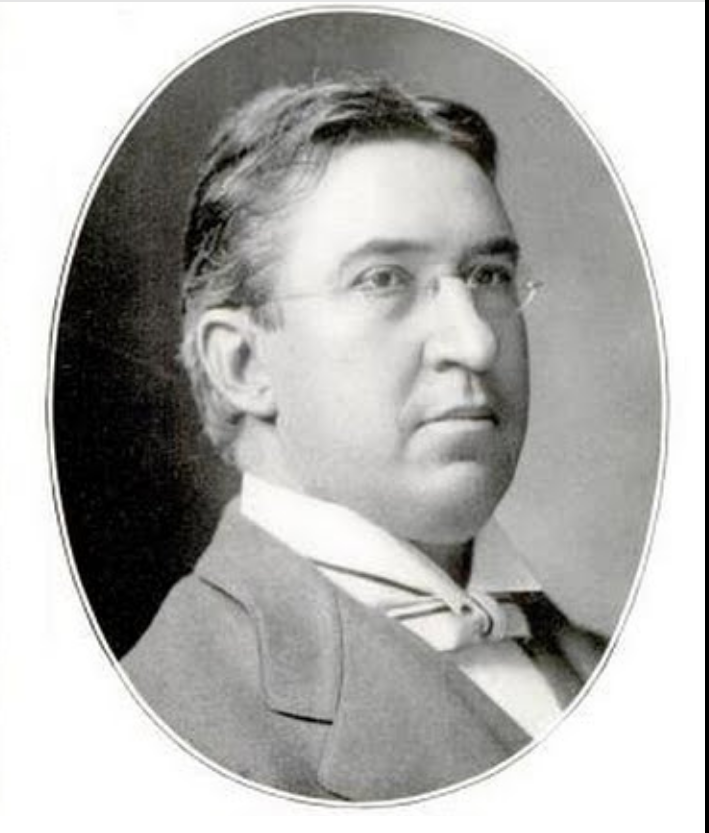
Arthur H. Noyes

Arthur H. Noyes (April 15, 1853 – March 19, 1915) was a lawyer in Minnesota and Dakota Territory who was appointed a Republican federal judge in the Territory of Alaska during the Alaskan gold rush era. He was convicted of contempt of court for corruption associated with misappropriating mining claims during the Nome Gold Rush and refusing to return the gold.

== Biography ==
Noyes was born in Baraboo, Wisconsin to D. K. Noyes, a colonel in the army and lawyer, and Clara Lucinda (Barnes) Noyes. He went to public school in Baraboo and the state university (University of Wisconsin) where he received a law degree in 1878. He entered into a partnership with his brother and classmate R. E. Noyes and relocated to Grand Forks, Dakota Territory in 1882 and then Minnesota in 1887. He belonged to the Elks, was part of a Masonic order, Knights Templar, and Shriner. He married Nancy Hawthorn in 1894.

He was one of three judges dispatched to Alaska in the summer of 1900, his appointment being secured by Republican North Dakota political boss Alexander McKenzie. McKenzie knew that Noyes was an excessive drinker and had financial problems, which could be exploited. In Alaska, McKenzie pursued a spurious claim over the richest mining stakes in the district, and got Noyes to issue an injunction allowing McKenzie to start mining the claims to the exclusion of the rightful owners. Noyes denied the owners' claims and denied them a right to appeal to federal Ninth Circuit in San Francisco. On September 24, 1900 (McKenzie had continued to mine the whole time), the Ninth Circuit's order demanding that McKenzie cease mining arrived in Alaska. McKenzie ignored the order and Noyes did not enforce it. The Ninth Circuit then had McKenzie arrested and sentenced him to a year in prison (President McKinley pardoned him after a few months). Noyes' decisions were rejected by the appellate court, but Noyes remained in office until the fall of 1901. He was found guilty of contempt, fined $1,000, and removed from office.

Returning to Baraboo, he died there in March 1915. Commissioner James Wickersham handled the proceedings against him and his co-conspirators. McKinley appointed Alfred S. Moore as Noyes' replacement on the bench.

A couple of senators came to his defense.

== See also ==
- The Spoilers, historical fiction novel using the events as a base for the storyline
