= Justice Moore =

Justice Moore may refer to:

- Alfred Moore (1755–1810), associate justice of the United States Supreme Court
- Alfred S. Moore (1846–1920), associate justice of the Alaska Territorial District Court
- Andrew G. T. Moore II (1935–2018), associate justice of the Delaware Supreme Court
- C. Edwin Moore (fl. 1960s–1970s), associate justice of the Iowa Supreme Court
- Charles Page Thomas Moore (1831–1904), associate justice of the Supreme Court of Appeals of West Virginia
- Dan K. Moore (1906–1986), associate justice of the North Carolina Supreme Court
- Daniel A. Moore Jr. (1933–2022), associate justice of the Alaska Supreme Court
- Frank A. Moore (1844–1918), chief justice of the Oregon Supreme Court
- George F. Moore (Texas judge) (1822–1883), justice of the Texas Supreme Court
- James E. Moore (judge) (born 1936), associate justice of the South Carolina Supreme Court
- Joseph B. Moore (Michigan judge) (1845–1930), associate justice of the Michigan Supreme Court
- Ostis Otto Moore (1896–1990), chief justice of the Colorado Supreme Court
- Roy Moore (born 1947), chief justice of the Supreme Court of Alabama
- W. F. Moore (1868–1956), associate justice of the Texas Supreme Court

== See also ==
- Nicholas More (died 1689), first chief justice of the Province of Pennsylvania
- Judge Moore (disambiguation)
