= Bibliography of the history of Alaska =

Bibliography of Alaska
- Alaska
- Subject: Alaska
- Scope: Books, journal articles, book chapters
- Period covered: Prehistory to the present
- Languages: English
- Related: Alaska Natives; Alaska Purchase; History of Alaska; Russian America

This is a select bibliography of academic level books and journal articles about Alaska: its history, peoples, languages, geography and environment. The bibliography runs from the prehistory of Beringia through Russian America, the Alaska Purchase, the territorial period and the gold rushes, the Second World War and the Cold War, and statehood, to the present. It covers Alaska Natives, the settlement of Native land claims, oil and resource development, and the environment.

Alaska is a U.S. state in northwestern North America. Part of the Western United States, it is one of the two non-contiguous states (the other is Hawaii) and a semi-exclave of the United States. It borders the Canadian territory of Yukon and the province of British Columbia to the east, and shares a maritime border across the Bering Strait with Russia's Chukotka Autonomous Okrug in Asia. The Chukchi and Beaufort seas of the Arctic Ocean lie to the north, and the Pacific Ocean lies to the south.

Bibliography contains academic level English language books (including translations) and journal articles, published mainly post World War II. (Note: Works published before World War II should be limited to areas where there are no significant post-World War II books on the subject or when the work in question has significant historical merit.) Book entries may have references to reviews published in academic journals or major newspapers and magazines when these could be considered helpful. These reference reviews also function as a resource to find other works on this subject.

Works listed here are cited in the notes or bibliographies of scholarly sources. Each is published by an academic or major trade press, written by a recognized expert, or substantially reviewed in scholarly journals; borderline cases are omitted. A selection of primary sources is included. Many of the books below carry their own bibliographies; see Further reading section for longer ones, and External links section for museums, library collections and academic programs.

Citations follow APA style. (Note: Entries are in plain text APA 7 format; templates are used only for identifiers, reviews and notes.) Books have citations to academic journal or mainstream published reviews when available. For books only partly about the subject, give relevant chapter or section titles where useful and available. Translators of the original-language edition are included when possible, and a footnote gives the original-language edition.

== General works ==
- Fitzhugh, W. W., & Crowell, A. (Eds.). (1988). Crossroads of continents: Cultures of Siberia and Alaska. Smithsonian Institution Press.
- Gruening, E. (1954). The state of Alaska. Random House.
- Haycox, S. (2002). Alaska: An American colony. University of Washington Press. (Note: A second edition was published by University of Washington Press in 2020.)
- Haycox, S. (2002). Frigid embrace: Politics, economics, and environment in Alaska. Oregon State University Press.
- Haycox, S. W., & Mangusso, M. C. (Eds.). (1996). An Alaska anthology: Interpreting the past. University of Washington Press. doi:10.1515/9780295800370
- Hunt, W. R. (1976). Alaska: A bicentennial history. W. W. Norton.
- Naske, C.-M., & Slotnick, H. E. (1979). Alaska: A history of the 49th state. Eerdmans.
- Sherwood, M. B. (Ed.). (1967). Alaska and its history. University of Washington Press.
- Willis, R. (2010). Alaska's place in the West: From the last frontier to the last great wilderness. University Press of Kansas.

== Archaeology and prehistory ==
- Dumond, D. E. (1977). The Eskimos and Aleuts. Thames and Hudson.
- Giddings, J. L. (1967). Ancient men of the Arctic. Knopf.
- Goebel, T., Waters, M. R., & O'Rourke, D. H. (2008). The late Pleistocene dispersal of modern humans in the Americas. Science, 319(5869), 1497–1502. doi:10.1126/science.1153569
- Hoffecker, J. F., Powers, W. R., & Goebel, T. (1993). The colonization of Beringia and the peopling of the New World. Science, 259(5091), 46–53. doi:10.1126/science.259.5091.46
- Hoffecker, J. F., & Elias, S. A. (2007). Human ecology of Beringia. Columbia University Press. doi:10.7312/hoff13060
- Hopkins, D. M. (Ed.). (1967). The Bering land bridge. Stanford University Press.
- Mason, O. K. (1998). The contest between the Ipiutak, Old Bering Sea, and Birnirk polities and the origin of whaling during the first millennium A.D. along Bering Strait. Journal of Anthropological Archaeology, 17(3), 240–325. doi:10.1006/jaar.1998.0324
- Mason, O. K., & Friesen, T. M. (2018). Out of the cold: Archaeology on the Arctic rim of North America. University Press of Colorado. doi:10.5876/9780932839565
- Potter, B. A. (2008). Radiocarbon chronology of central Alaska: Technological continuity and economic change. Radiocarbon, 50(2), 181–204. doi:10.1017/S0033822200033518
- Potter, B. A., Irish, J. D., Reuther, J. D., Gelvin-Reymiller, C., & Holliday, V. T. (2011). A terminal Pleistocene child cremation and residential structure from eastern Beringia. Science, 331(6020), 1058–1062. doi:10.1126/science.1201581
- West, F. H. (Ed.). (1996). American beginnings: The prehistory and palaeoecology of Beringia. University of Chicago Press.

== History ==
=== Russian America ===
- Black, L. T. (2004). Russians in Alaska, 1732–1867. University of Alaska Press.
- Chevigny, H. (1965). Russian America: The great Alaskan venture, 1741–1867. Viking Press.
- Frost, O. W. (2003). Bering: The Russian discovery of America. Yale University Press.
- Gibson, J. R. (1976). Imperial Russia in frontier America: The changing geography of supply of Russian America, 1784–1867. Oxford University Press.
- Gibson, J. R. (1992). Otter skins, Boston ships, and China goods: The maritime fur trade of the Northwest Coast, 1785–1841. McGill-Queen's University Press. doi:10.1515/9780773582026
- Grinev, A. V. (2010). The plans for Russian expansion in the New World and the North Pacific in the eighteenth and nineteenth centuries. European Journal of American Studies, 5(2). doi:10.4000/ejas.7805
- Grinev, A. V. (2015). Russia's emperors and Russian America (for the four hundredth anniversary of the Romanov dynasty). Russian Studies in History, 54(1), 5–35. doi:10.1080/10611983.2015.1082325
- Grinëv, A. V. (2018). Russian colonization of Alaska: Preconditions, discovery, and initial development, 1741–1799 (R. L. Bland, Trans.). University of Nebraska Press. JSTOR j.ctv75d7t7
- Jones, R. T. (2014). Empire of extinction: Russians and the North Pacific's strange beasts of the sea, 1741–1867. Oxford University Press. doi:10.1093/acprof:oso/9780199343416.001.0001
- Miller, G. A. (2010). Kodiak kreol: Communities of empire in early Russian America. Cornell University Press. doi:10.7591/9781501701412
- Okun, S. B. (1951). The Russian-American Company (C. Ginsburg, Trans.). Harvard University Press. doi:10.4159/harvard.9780674337343 (Note: Translated from the Russian-language edition, Rossiisko-amerikanskaia kompaniia (1939).)
- Saul, N. (2018). California-Alaska trade, 1851–1867: The American Russian Commercial Company and the Russian America Company and the sale/purchase of Alaska. Journal of Russian American Studies, 2(1), 1–14. doi:10.17161/jras.v2i1.7554
- Tikhmenev, P. A. (1978). A history of the Russian-American Company (R. A. Pierce & A. S. Donnelly, Trans. & Eds.). University of Washington Press. (Note: Originally published in Russian in two volumes (1861–1863).)
- Vinkovetsky, I. (2010). Building a diocese overseas: The Orthodox Church in partnership with the Russian-American Company in Alaska. Ab Imperio, 2010(3), 152–194. doi:10.1353/imp.2010.0058
- Vinkovetsky, I. (2011). Russian America: An overseas colony of a continental empire, 1804–1867. Oxford University Press. doi:10.1093/acprof:oso/9780195391282.001.0001
- Vinkovetsky, I. (2022). The Russian-American Company as a corporation. The Russian Review, 81(3), 421–439. doi:10.1111/russ.12369

=== The Alaska Purchase ===
- Bailey, T. A. (1934). Why the United States purchased Alaska. Pacific Historical Review, 3(1), 39–49. JSTOR 3633456
- Cavell, J. (2023). Dividing the northern world: The Arctic and the Alaska Purchase. Diplomatic History, 47(2), 304–328. doi:10.1093/dh/dhac094
- Farrar, V. J. (1937). The annexation of Russian America to the United States. W. F. Roberts.
- Golder, F. A. (1920). The purchase of Alaska. American Historical Review, 25(3), 411–425. doi:10.1086/ahr/25.3.411
- Holbo, P. S. (1983). Tarnished expansion: The Alaska scandal, the press, and Congress, 1867–1871. University of Tennessee Press.
- Jensen, R. J. (1975). The Alaska Purchase and Russian-American relations. University of Washington Press.
- Kushner, H. I. (1975). Conflict on the Northwest Coast: American-Russian rivalry in the Pacific Northwest, 1790–1867. Greenwood Press.
- Saul, N. E. (1991). Distant friends: The United States and Russia, 1763–1867. University Press of Kansas.

=== Territorial Alaska ===
- Campbell, R. (2007). In darkest Alaska: Travel and empire along the Inside Passage. University of Pennsylvania Press. doi:10.9783/9780812201529
- Fortuine, R. (1989). Chills and fever: Health and disease in the early history of Alaska. University of Alaska Press.
- Goetzmann, W. H., & Sloan, K. (1982). Looking far north: The Harriman Expedition to Alaska, 1899. Viking Press.
- Haycox, S. W. (1990). Economic development and Indian land rights in modern Alaska: The 1947 Tongass Timber Act. Western Historical Quarterly, 21(1), 20. JSTOR 968974
- Hinckley, T. C. (1966). The Presbyterian leadership in pioneer Alaska. Journal of American History, 52(4), 742. JSTOR 1894344
- Hinckley, T. C. (1972). The Americanization of Alaska, 1867–1897. Pacific Books.
- Hinckley, T. C. (1973). Alaska as an American Botany Bay. Pacific Historical Review, 42(1), 1–19. JSTOR 3637739
- Hinckley, T. C. (1982). Alaskan John G. Brady: Missionary, businessman, judge, and governor, 1878–1918. Ohio State University Press.
- Hunt, W. R. (1987). Distant justice: Policing the Alaska frontier. University of Oklahoma Press.
- Miller, O. W. (1975). The frontier in Alaska and the Matanuska Colony. Yale University Press.
- Mitchell, D. C. (1997). Sold American: The story of Alaska Natives and their land, 1867–1959: The Army to statehood. University Press of New England.
- Nichols, J. P. (1924). Alaska: A history of its administration, exploitation, and industrial development during its first half century under the rule of the United States. Arthur H. Clark.
- Sherwood, M. B. (1965). Exploration of Alaska, 1865–1900. Yale University Press.

=== World War II and the Cold War ===
- Coates, K. S., & Morrison, W. R. (1992). The Alaska Highway in World War II: The U.S. Army of occupation in Canada's Northwest. University of Oklahoma Press.
- Garfield, B. (1969). The thousand-mile war: World War II in Alaska and the Aleutians. Doubleday. (Note: Reissued by University of Alaska Press in 2010.)
- Hays, O., Jr. (2004). Alaska's hidden wars: Secret campaigns on the North Pacific rim. University of Alaska Press.
- Hummel, L. J. (2005). The U.S. military as geographical agent: The case of Cold War Alaska. Geographical Review, 95(1), 47–72. doi:10.1111/j.1931-0846.2005.tb00191.x
- O'Neill, D. (1994). The firecracker boys. St. Martin's Press.
- Perras, G. R. (1992). Canada as a military partner: Alliance politics and the campaign to recapture the Aleutian island of Kiska. Journal of Military History, 56(3), 423. JSTOR 1985971
- Perras, G. R. (2003). Stepping stones to nowhere: The Aleutian Islands, Alaska, and American military strategy, 1867–1945. UBC Press. doi:10.59962/9780774850490

=== Statehood ===
- Cole, T. (2010). Fighting for the forty-ninth star: C. W. Snedden and the crusade for Alaska statehood. University of Alaska Press. doi:10.5876/9781883309077
- Evans, C. L. (2024). Alaska, Hawaii, and the congressional politics of statehood, 1947–1959. Congress & the Presidency, 51(2), 198–222. doi:10.1080/07343469.2024.2342859
- Kinevan, M. E. (1950). Alaska and Hawaii: From territoriality to statehood. California Law Review, 38(2), 273. JSTOR 3478060
- Naske, C.-M. (1973). An interpretative history of Alaskan statehood. Alaska Northwest Publishing.
- Naske, C.-M. (1985). A history of Alaska statehood. University Press of America.
- Whitehead, J. S. (2004). Completing the union: Alaska, Hawai'i, and the battle for statehood. University of New Mexico Press.

==== Government and politics ====
- Haycox, S. (2016). Battleground Alaska: Fighting federal power in America's last wilderness. University Press of Kansas. doi:10.1353/book44977
- Haycox, S. (2017). Battleground Alaska: Antistatism and environmental protection in America's last wilderness. Western Historical Quarterly, 48(2), 115–136. doi:10.1093/whq/whw212
- Johnson, R. D. (1998). Ernest Gruening and the American dissenting tradition (Harvard Historical Studies, No. 132). Harvard University Press.
- McBeath, G. A., & Morehouse, T. A. (1994). Alaska politics and government. University of Nebraska Press.
- McBeath, G. A. (1997). The Alaska state constitution: A reference guide. Greenwood Press. doi:10.5040/9798216192657
- Naske, C.-M. (1979). Edward Lewis "Bob" Bartlett of Alaska: A life in politics. University Press of America.
- Thomas, C. S. (Ed.). (2016). Alaska politics and public policy: The dynamics of beliefs, institutions, personalities, and power. University of Alaska Press. doi:10.5876/9781602232907

=== Legal ===
- Berger, T. R. (1985). Village journey: The report of the Alaska Native Review Commission. Hill and Wang.
- Blurton, D. (1984). Tribal sovereignty: Alaskan Native exercise of sovereign powers. American Indian Law Review, 12(2), 245. JSTOR 20068260
- Case, D. S., & Voluck, D. A. (2012). Alaska Natives and American laws (3rd ed.). University of Alaska Press. doi:10.5876/9781602231764
- Harrison, G. S. (1972). The Alaska Native Claims Settlement Act, 1971. Arctic, 25(3). doi:10.14430/arctic2965
- Haynes, J. B. (1976). The Alaska Native Claims Settlement Act and changing patterns of land ownership in Alaska. The Professional Geographer, 28(1), 66–71. doi:10.1111/j.0033-0124.1976.00066.x
- Huhndorf, R. M., & Huhndorf, S. M. (2011). Alaska Native politics since the Alaska Native Claims Settlement Act. South Atlantic Quarterly, 110(2), 385–401. doi:10.1215/00382876-1162507
- Mitchell, D. C. (2001). Take my land, take my life: The story of Congress's historic settlement of Alaska Native land claims, 1960–1971. University of Alaska Press.
- Morehouse, T. A. (1989). Sovereignty, tribal government, and the Alaska Native Claims Settlement Act Amendments of 1987. Polar Record, 25(154), 197–206. doi:10.1017/S0032247400010792
- Swensen, T. M. (2015). Of subjection and sovereignty: Alaska Native corporations and tribal governments in the twenty-first century. Wicazo Sa Review, 30(1), 100. doi:10.5749/wicazosareview.30.1.0100

=== The Permanent Fund ===
- Chung, W., Ha, H., & Kim, B. (2016). Money transfer and birth weight: Evidence from the Alaska Permanent Fund Dividend. Economic Inquiry, 54(1), 576–590. doi:10.1111/ecin.12235
- Jones, D., & Marinescu, I. (2022). The labor market impacts of universal and permanent cash transfers: Evidence from the Alaska Permanent Fund. American Economic Journal: Economic Policy, 14(2), 315–340. doi:10.1257/pol.20190299
- Widerquist, K., & Howard, M. W. (Eds.). (2012). Alaska's Permanent Fund Dividend: Examining its suitability as a model. Palgrave Macmillan. doi:10.1057/9781137015020

== Ethnography ==
=== General and comparative works ===
- Catton, T. (1997). Inhabited wilderness: Indians, Eskimos, and national parks in Alaska. University of New Mexico Press.
- Dombrowski, K. (2001). Against culture: Development, politics, and religion in Indian Alaska (Fourth World Rising). University of Nebraska Press.
- Fitzhugh, W. W., & Kaplan, S. A. (1982). Inua: Spirit world of the Bering Sea Eskimo. Smithsonian Institution Press.
- Mousalimas, S. A. (1995). The transition from shamanism to Russian Orthodoxy in Alaska. Berghahn Books.
- Oleksa, M. (1992). Orthodox Alaska: A theology of mission. St. Vladimir's Seminary Press.
- Oswalt, W. H. (1967). Alaskan Eskimos. Chandler.
- Oswalt, W. H. (1990). Bashful no longer: An Alaskan Eskimo ethnohistory, 1778–1988. University of Oklahoma Press.
- Ray, D. J. (1975). The Eskimos of Bering Strait, 1650–1898. University of Washington Press.
- Znamenski, A. A. (1999). Shamanism and Christianity: Native encounters with Russian Orthodox missions in Siberia and Alaska, 1820–1917 (Contributions to the Study of World History, No. 70). Greenwood Press.

=== Athabascans ===
- Nelson, R. K. (1983). Make prayers to the raven: A Koyukon view of the northern forest. University of Chicago Press.
- Osgood, C. (1937). The ethnography of the Tanaina (Yale University Publications in Anthropology, No. 16). Yale University Press.
- Simeone, W. E. (1995). Rifles, blankets, and beads: Identity, history, and the northern Athapaskan potlatch. University of Oklahoma Press.
- VanStone, J. W. (1974). Athapaskan adaptations: Hunters and fishermen of the subarctic forests. Aldine.

=== Iñupiat ===
- Blackman, M. B. (1989). Sadie Brower Neakok: An Iñupiaq woman. University of Washington Press.
- Burch, E. S., Jr. (1971). The nonempirical environment of the Arctic Alaskan Eskimos. Southwestern Journal of Anthropology, 27(2), 148–165. doi:10.1086/soutjanth.27.2.3629237
- Burch, E. S., Jr. (1998). The Iñupiaq Eskimo nations of northwest Alaska. University of Alaska Press.
- Burch, E. S., Jr. (2005). Alliance and conflict: The world system of the Iñupiaq Eskimos. University of Nebraska Press. JSTOR j.ctv6gqqgg
- Burch, E. S., Jr. (2006). Social life in northwest Alaska: The structure of Iñupiaq Eskimo nations. University of Alaska Press.
- Chance, N. A. (1990). The Iñupiat and Arctic Alaska: An ethnography of development. Holt, Rinehart and Winston.
- Nelson, E. W. (1899). The Eskimo about Bering Strait. In Eighteenth annual report of the Bureau of American Ethnology, 1896–1897 (Part 1). Government Printing Office.
- Nelson, R. K. (1969). Hunters of the northern ice. University of Chicago Press.
- Sakakibara, C. (2020). Whale snow: Iñupiat, climate change, and multispecies resilience in Arctic Alaska. University of Arizona Press. JSTOR j.ctv1595kz4
- Spencer, R. F. (1959). The North Alaskan Eskimo: A study in ecology and society (Bureau of American Ethnology Bulletin 171). Smithsonian Institution.

=== Tlingit ===
- De Laguna, F. (1972). Under Mount Saint Elias: The history and culture of the Yakutat Tlingit (Smithsonian Contributions to Anthropology, Vol. 7, Parts 1–3). Smithsonian Institution Press. doi:10.5479/si.00810223.7.1
- Emmons, G. T. (1991). The Tlingit Indians (F. de Laguna, Ed.). University of Washington Press.
- Hinckley, T. C. (1996). The canoe rocks: Alaska's Tlingit and the Euramerican frontier, 1800–1912. University Press of America.
- Kan, S. (1985). Russian Orthodox brotherhoods among the Tlingit: Missionary goals and native response. Ethnohistory, 32(3), 196. JSTOR 481921
- Kan, S. (1986). The 19th-century Tlingit potlatch: A new perspective. American Ethnologist, 13(2), 191–212. doi:10.1525/ae.1986.13.2.02a00010
- Kan, S. (1989). Symbolic immortality: The Tlingit potlatch of the nineteenth century. Smithsonian Institution Press.
- Kan, S. (1991). Shamanism and Christianity: Modern-day Tlingit elders look at the past. Ethnohistory, 38(4), 363. JSTOR 482478
- Kan, S. (1996). Clan mothers and godmothers: Tlingit women and Russian Orthodox Christianity, 1840–1940. Ethnohistory, 43(4), 613. JSTOR 483248
- Kan, S. (1999). Memory eternal: Tlingit culture and Russian Orthodox Christianity through two centuries. University of Washington Press. doi:10.1515/9780295805344
- Thornton, T. F. (2008). Being and place among the Tlingit. University of Washington Press. doi:10.1515/9780295800400

=== Unangan (Aleuts) and Alutiiq ===
- Crowell, A. L., Steffian, A. F., & Pullar, G. L. (Eds.). (2001). Looking both ways: Heritage and identity of the Alutiiq people. University of Alaska Press.
- Jochelson, W. (1933). History, ethnology and anthropology of the Aleut. Carnegie Institution of Washington.
- Laughlin, W. S. (1980). Aleuts: Survivors of the Bering land bridge. Holt, Rinehart and Winston.
- Luehrmann, S. (2008). Alutiiq villages under Russian and U.S. rule. University of Alaska Press.
- Reedy-Maschner, K. L. (2010). Aleut identities: Tradition and modernity in an indigenous fishery. McGill-Queen's University Press. doi:10.1515/9780773584075

=== Yup'ik ===
- Fienup-Riordan, A. (1988). Robert Redford, Apanuugpak, and the invention of tradition. American Ethnologist, 15(3), 442–455. doi:10.1525/ae.1988.15.3.02a00020
- Fienup-Riordan, A. (1990). Eskimo essays: Yup'ik lives and how we see them. Rutgers University Press.
- Fienup-Riordan, A. (1991). The real people and the children of thunder: The Yup'ik Eskimo encounter with Moravian missionaries John and Edith Kilbuck. University of Oklahoma Press.
- Fienup-Riordan, A. (1994). Boundaries and passages: Rule and ritual in Yup'ik Eskimo oral tradition. University of Oklahoma Press.
- Fienup-Riordan, A. (1999). Collaboration on display: A Yup'ik Eskimo exhibit at three national museums. American Anthropologist, 101(2), 339–358. doi:10.1525/aa.1999.101.2.339
- Fienup-Riordan, A. (2000). Hunting tradition in a changing world: Yup'ik lives in Alaska today. Rutgers University Press.
- Fienup-Riordan, A., & Rearden, A. (2003). Kenekngamceci qanrutamceci (We talk to you because we love you): Yup'ik "culturalism" at the Umkumiut culture camp. Arctic Anthropology, 40(2), 100–106. doi:10.1353/arc.2011.0009
- Fienup-Riordan, A. (2010). Yup'ik perspectives on climate change: "The world is following its people". Études/Inuit/Studies, 34(1), 55–70. doi:10.7202/045404ar
- Oswalt, W. H. (1963). Napaskiak: An Alaskan Eskimo community. University of Arizona Press.

== Ethnic cleansing and racial violence ==
- Jones, Z. R. (2013). "Search for and destroy": US Army relations with Alaska's Tlingit Indians and the Kake War of 1869. Ethnohistory, 60(1), 1–26. doi:10.1215/00141801-1816157
- Kohlhoff, D. (1995). When the wind was a river: Aleut evacuation in World War II. University of Washington Press.
- Veltre, D. W., & McCartney, A. P. (2002). Russian exploitation of Aleuts and fur seals: The archaeology of eighteenth- and early-nineteenth-century settlements in the Pribilof Islands, Alaska. Historical Archaeology, 36(3), 8–17. doi:10.1007/bf03374356

== Topical ==
=== Languages ===
- Fortescue, M., Jacobson, S., & Kaplan, L. (2010). Comparative Eskimo dictionary with Aleut cognates (2nd ed.). Alaska Native Language Center.
- Kari, J. (Ed.). (1990). Ahtna Athabaskan dictionary. Alaska Native Language Center.
- Krauss, M. E. (1980). Alaska Native languages: Past, present, and future. Alaska Native Language Center.

=== Geography and environment ===
- Arendt, A. A., Echelmeyer, K. A., Harrison, W. D., Lingle, C. S., & Valentine, V. B. (2002). Rapid wastage of Alaska glaciers and their contribution to rising sea level. Science, 297(5580), 382–386. doi:10.1126/science.1072497
- Cooley, R. A. (1963). Politics and conservation: The decline of the Alaska salmon. Harper & Row.
- Demuth, B. (2019). Floating coast: An environmental history of the Bering Strait. W. W. Norton.
- Jorgenson, M. T., Shur, Y. L., & Pullman, E. R. (2006). Abrupt increase in permafrost degradation in Arctic Alaska. Geophysical Research Letters, 33(2). doi:10.1029/2005GL024960
- Kaye, R. (2006). Last great wilderness: The campaign to establish the Arctic National Wildlife Refuge. University of Alaska Press.
- Kollin, S. (2001). Nature's state: Imagining Alaska as the last frontier. University of North Carolina Press.
- Larsen, P., Goldsmith, S., Smith, O., Wilson, M., Strzepek, K., Chinowsky, P., & Saylor, B. (2008). Estimating future costs for Alaska public infrastructure at risk from climate change. Global Environmental Change, 18(3), 442–457. doi:10.1016/j.gloenvcha.2008.03.005
- Peterson, C. H., Rice, S. D., Short, J. W., Esler, D., Bodkin, J. L., Ballachey, B. E., & Irons, D. B. (2003). Long-term ecosystem response to the Exxon Valdez oil spill. Science, 302(5653), 2082–2086. doi:10.1126/science.1084282
- Sturm, M., Racine, C., & Tape, K. (2001). Increasing shrub abundance in the Arctic. Nature, 411(6837), 546–547. doi:10.1038/35079180

=== Economic development ===
- Arnold, D. F. (2008). The fishermen's frontier: People and salmon in southeast Alaska. University of Washington Press. doi:10.1515/9780295989754
- Betts, M. F., & Wolfe, R. J. (1992). Commercialization of fisheries and the subsistence economies of the Alaska Tlingit. Society & Natural Resources, 5(3), 277–295. doi:10.1080/08941929209380792
- Bockstoce, J. R. (1986). Whales, ice, and men: The history of whaling in the western Arctic. University of Washington Press.
- Bockstoce, J. R. (2009). Furs and frontiers in the far north: The contest among native and foreign nations for the Bering Strait fur trade. Yale University Press. doi:10.12987/9780300154900
- Busch, B. C. (1985). The war against the seals: A history of the North American seal fishery. McGill-Queen's University Press.
- Ellanna, L. J., & Wheeler, P. C. (1989). Wetlands and subsistence-based economies in Alaska, U.S.A. Arctic and Alpine Research, 21(4), 329–340. doi:10.1080/00040851.1989.12002747
- Friday, C. (1994). Organizing Asian American labor: The Pacific Coast canned-salmon industry, 1870–1942. Temple University Press.
- Howe, E. L. (2009). Patterns of migration in Arctic Alaska. Polar Geography, 32(1–2), 69–89. doi:10.1080/10889370903000422
- Huskey, L. (2018). An Arctic development strategy? The North Slope Inupiat and the resource curse. Canadian Journal of Development Studies, 39(1), 89–100. doi:10.1080/02255189.2017.1391067
- Knapp, G., & Huskey, L. (1988). Effects of transfers on remote regional economies: The transfer economy in rural Alaska. Growth and Change, 19(2), 25–39. doi:10.1111/j.1468-2257.1988.tb00467.x
- Rogers, G. W. (1962). The future of Alaska: Economic consequences of statehood. Johns Hopkins Press.

=== Mining ===
==== Gold and silver ====
- Cole, T. (1991). Crooked past: The history of a frontier mining camp: Fairbanks, Alaska. University of Alaska Press.
- Demuth, B. (2019). Grounding capitalism: Geology, labor, and the Nome gold rush. In B. Mountford & S. Tuffnell (Eds.), A global history of gold rushes (pp. 252–272). University of California Press. doi:10.1525/9780520967588-015
- Hunt, W. R. (1974). North of 53: The wild days of the Alaska-Yukon mining frontier, 1870–1914. Macmillan.
- Morse, K. (2003). The nature of gold: An environmental history of the Klondike gold rush. University of Washington Press. doi:10.1515/9780295989877
- Spence, C. C. (1996). The northern gold fleet: Twentieth-century gold dredging in Alaska. University of Illinois Press.
- Wharton, D. (1972). The Alaska gold rush. Indiana University Press.

==== Rare earths and critical minerals ====
- Dostal, J., Kontak, D. J., & Karl, S. M. (2014). The Early Jurassic Bokan Mountain peralkaline granitic complex (southeastern Alaska): Geochemistry, petrogenesis and rare-metal mineralization. Lithos, 202–203, 395–412. doi:10.1016/j.lithos.2014.06.005
- McCafferty, A. E., Stoeser, D. B., & Van Gosen, B. S. (2014). Geophysical interpretation of U, Th, and rare earth element mineralization of the Bokan Mountain peralkaline granite complex, Prince of Wales Island, southeast Alaska. Interpretation, 2(4), SJ47–SJ63. doi:10.1190/int-2014-0010.1

=== Oil and natural gas ===
- Coates, P. A. (1991). The Trans-Alaska Pipeline controversy: Technology, conservation, and the frontier. Lehigh University Press.
- Kruse, J., Kleinfeld, J., & Travis, R. (1982). Energy development on Alaska's North Slope: Effects on the Inupiat population. Human Organization, 41(2), 97–106. doi:10.17730/humo.41.2.t823308164w76158
- McBeath, J., Berman, M., Rosenberg, J., & Ehrlander, M. F. (2008). The political economy of oil in Alaska: Multinationals vs. the state. Lynne Rienner. doi:10.1515/9781685857820
- Morehouse, T. A., & Leask, L. (1980). Alaska's North Slope Borough: Oil, money and Eskimo self-government. Polar Record, 20(124), 19–29. doi:10.1017/s0032247400002886
- Palinkas, L. A., Downs, M. A., Petterson, J. S., & Russell, J. (1993). Social, cultural, and psychological impacts of the Exxon Valdez oil spill. Human Organization, 52(1), 1–13. doi:10.17730/humo.52.1.162688w475154m34
- Perkins, R. A. (2015). Oil spill, August 1944: The CULA expedition and the North Slope Inupiat. Polar Record, 51(2), 201–211. doi:10.1017/s0032247414000011
- Picou, J. S., Gill, D. A., Dyer, C. L., & Curry, E. W. (1992). Disruption and stress in an Alaskan fishing community: Initial and continuing impacts of the Exxon Valdez oil spill. Industrial Crisis Quarterly, 6(3), 235–257. doi:10.1177/108602669200600305
- Standlea, D. M. (2006). Oil, globalization, and the war for the Arctic Refuge. State University of New York Press. doi:10.1353/book5013

=== Transportation ===
- Fitch, E. M. (1967). The Alaska Railroad. Praeger.
- Naske, C.-M. (1986). Paving Alaska's trails: The work of the Alaska Road Commission. University Press of America.
- Wilson, W. H. (1977). Railroad in the clouds: The Alaska Railroad in the age of steam, 1914–1945. Pruett.

== Reference works ==
- Damas, D. (Ed.). (1984). Handbook of North American Indians: Vol. 5. Arctic. Smithsonian Institution.
- Helm, J. (Ed.). (1981). Handbook of North American Indians: Vol. 6. Subarctic. Smithsonian Institution.
- Nuttall, M. (Ed.). (2005). Encyclopedia of the Arctic. Routledge. doi:10.4324/9780203997857
- Orth, D. J. (1967). Dictionary of Alaska place names (Geological Survey Professional Paper 567). U.S. Government Printing Office. doi:10.3133/pp567
- Suttles, W. (Ed.). (1990). Handbook of North American Indians: Vol. 7. Northwest Coast. Smithsonian Institution.

== Primary sources ==
=== Russian America ===
- Dmytryshyn, B., & Crownhart-Vaughan, E. A. P. (Eds. & Trans.). (1976). Colonial Russian America: Kyrill T. Khlebnikov's reports, 1817–1832. Oregon Historical Society. (Note: Translated from Russian-language reports written by Kirill T. Khlebnikov, an official of the Russian-American Company at Novo-Arkhangel'sk.)
- Dmytryshyn, B., Crownhart-Vaughan, E. A. P., & Vaughan, T. (Eds. & Trans.). (1989). The Russian American colonies, 1798–1867: A documentary record (To Siberia and Russian America: Three centuries of Russian eastward expansion, Vol. 3). Oregon Historical Society Press. (Note: The documents are translated from Russian-language archival and published sources.)
- Golovin, P. N. (1979). The end of Russian America: Captain P. N. Golovin's last report, 1862 (B. Dmytryshyn & E. A. P. Crownhart-Vaughan, Trans.). Oregon Historical Society.
- Shelikhov, G. I. (1981). A voyage to America, 1783–1786 (M. Ramsay, Trans.; R. A. Pierce, Ed.). Limestone Press.
- Steller, G. W. (1988). Journal of a voyage with Bering, 1741–1742 (M. A. Engel & O. W. Frost, Trans.; O. W. Frost, Ed.). Stanford University Press. doi:10.1515/9781503621459 (Note: Steller's German-language journal of the Second Kamchatka Expedition was first published in 1793.)
- Veniaminov, I. (1984). Notes on the islands of the Unalashka district (L. T. Black & R. H. Geoghegan, Trans.; R. A. Pierce, Ed.). Limestone Press.
- Wrangell, F. P. (1980). Russian America: Statistical and ethnographic information (M. Sadouski, Trans.; R. A. Pierce, Ed.). Limestone Press.
- Zagoskin, L. A. (1967). Lieutenant Zagoskin's travels in Russian America, 1842–1844 (P. Rainey, Trans.; H. N. Michael, Ed.). University of Toronto Press. doi:10.3138/9781487582906 (Note: Originally published in Russian (1847–1848).)

=== Government documents and reports ===
- Commission on Wartime Relocation and Internment of Civilians. (2012). Personal justice denied: Report of the Commission on Wartime Relocation and Internment of Civilians ("War and evacuation in Alaska", pp. 317–360). University of Washington Press. doi:10.1515/9780295802343

=== Memoirs and oral histories ===
- Brower, C. D. (1994). Fifty years below zero: A lifetime of adventure in the far north (with P. J. Farrelly & L. Anson). University of Alaska Press. (Original work published 1942)
- Dauenhauer, N. M., & Dauenhauer, R. (Eds.). (1987). Haa shuká, our ancestors: Tlingit oral narratives. University of Washington Press.
- Dauenhauer, N. M., & Dauenhauer, R. (Eds.). (1994). Haa kusteeyí, our culture: Tlingit life stories. University of Washington Press.

=== Travel accounts ===
- Cook, J. (1967). The journals of Captain James Cook on his voyages of discovery: Vol. 3. The voyage of the Resolution and Discovery, 1776–1780 (J. C. Beaglehole, Ed.). Hakluyt Society.
- Dall, W. H. (1870). Alaska and its resources. Lee and Shepard.
- Marshall, R. (1970). Alaska wilderness: Exploring the central Brooks Range (G. Marshall, Ed.; 2nd ed.). University of California Press. doi:10.1525/9780520325661 (Note: First published as Marshall, R. (1956). Arctic wilderness (G. Marshall, Ed.). University of California Press.)
- Muir, J. (1915). Travels in Alaska. Houghton Mifflin.
- Stuck, H. (1914). Ten thousand miles with a dog sled. Charles Scribner's Sons.

== See also ==
- Alaska Native Claims Settlement Act
- Alaska Natives
- Alaska Purchase
- History of Alaska
- Russian America
