= Banks Township, Michigan =

- Civil township
- Flag

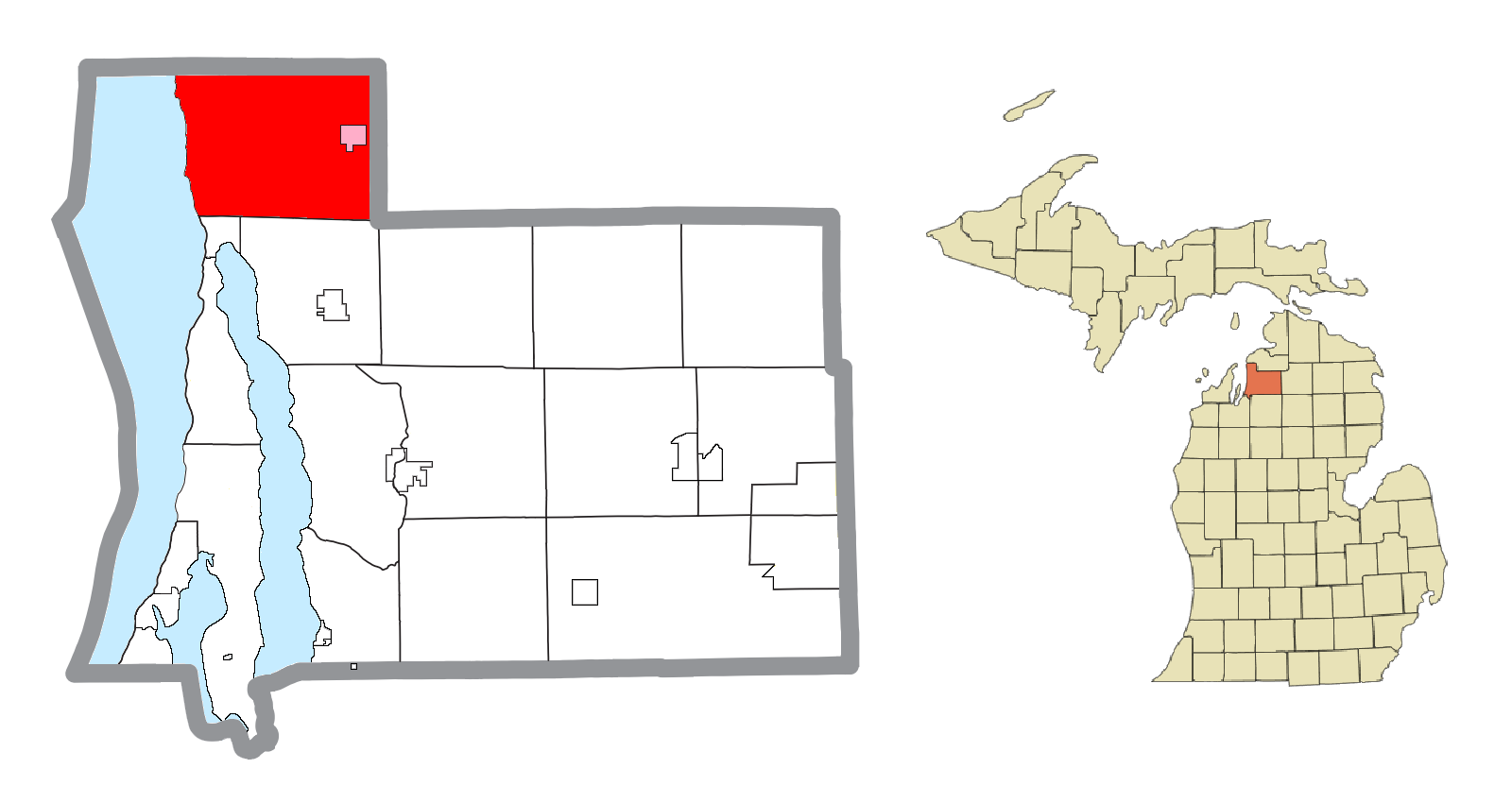
- Location within Antrim County (red) and the administered village of Ellsworth (pink)

- Location within the state of Michigan Banks Township (the United States)
- Coordinates: 45°09′40″N 85°18′23″W
- Country: United States
- State: Michigan
- County: Antrim
- Established: 1898

Government
  - Supervisor: Thomas P. Mann
  - Clerk: Donna Heeres

Area
  - Total: 51.2 sq mi (132.7 km^{2})
  - Land: 44.9 sq mi (116.4 km^{2})
  - Water: 6.3 sq mi (16.3 km^{2})
- Elevation: 735 ft (224 m)

Population (2020)
  - Total: 1,588
  - Density: 35.33/sq mi (13.64/km^{2})
- Time zone: UTC-5 (Eastern (EST))
  - Summer (DST): UTC-4 (EDT)
- ZIP code(s): 49622 (Central Lake); 49720 (Charlevoix); 49729 (Ellsworth)
- Area code: 231
- FIPS code: 26-05240
- GNIS feature ID: 1625881
- Website: Official website

Banks Township is a civil township of Antrim County in the U.S. state of Michigan. As of the 2020 census, the township population was 1,588.

== Communities ==
- Antrim City was a short-lived settlement on the Lake Michigan shores. Wood, Pearl and Company began shipping operations circa 1861. A post office operated from July 21, 1862, until April 19, 1882. The principals behind Wood, Pearl and Company, Orvis Wood, Lucius Pearl and Orin Adams had moved operations to Norwood, Michigan by 1867.
- Atwood is an unincorporated community at 45°10′45″N 85°20′43″W at the junction of country road C-48 and US 31. Atwood was a lumber settlement with a post office operating from 1868 until 1905. In 1931, Atwood attracted national attention when it was announced that a church, two stores, a garage and over a dozen residences whose entrances faced U.S. Route 31 would be moved fifty feet back, as their proximity to the highway made them unsafe. Atwood is the birthplace of the writer Rex Beach, best known for his 1906 novel The Spoilers, which was made into a movie five times, most notably in 1930 starring Gary Cooper and in 1942 starring John Wayne.
- Ellsworth is a village on the east side of the township.
- Essex was a lumbering community in this township. It had a post office from 1900 until 1904.

== Geography ==
According to the United States Census Bureau, the township has a total area of 51.2 square miles (132.7 km^{2}), of which 44.9 square miles (116.4 km^{2}) is land and 6.3 square miles (16.3 km^{2}), or 12.30%, is water.

== Demographics ==
As of the census of 2000, there were 1,813 people, 675 households, and 517 families residing in the township. The population density was 40.3 inhabitants per square mile (15.6/km^{2}). There were 995 housing units at an average density of 22.1 per square mile (8.5/km^{2}). The racial makeup of the township was 97.79% White, 0.17% African American, 0.72% Native American, 0.28% Asian, 0.33% from other races, and 0.72% from two or more races. Hispanic or Latino of any race were 1.38% of the population.

There were 675 households, out of which 35.7% had children under the age of 18 living with them, 66.7% were married couples living together, 6.1% had a female householder with no husband present, and 23.4% were non-families. 20.7% of all households were made up of individuals, and 9.5% had someone living alone who was 65 years of age or older. The average household size was 2.63 and the average family size was 3.00.

In the township, the population was spread out, with 28.3% under the age of 18, 5.4% from 18 to 24, 27.7% from 25 to 44, 24.7% from 45 to 64, and 13.9% who were 65 years of age or older. The median age was 39 years. For every 100 females, there were 102.3 males. For every 100 females age 18 and over, there were 98.5 males.

The median income for a household in the township was $41,500, and the median income for a family was $46,250. Males had a median income of $35,481 versus $25,417 for females. The per capita income for the township was $17,378. About 5.4% of families and 7.2% of the population were below the poverty line, including 8.7% of those under age 18 and 10.9% of those age 65 or over.
