= Alexander McKenzie (politician) =

American politician (1851–1922)

Alexander John McKenzie (1850–1922) was a lawman and politician in early North Dakota. As the Republican national committeeman from North Dakota, he directed a highly successful political machine, and was known as the "senator-maker." He was highly influential in North Dakota and in neighboring Montana and Minnesota. He served time in prison for corruption, and became the first North Dakotan to receive a presidential pardon.

== Biography ==
=== Life ===
McKenzie was born April 13, 1850, in New York, the son of Irish immigrants. It was rumored that he was born in Scotland or in Canada, but these rumors are not substantiated by the records.

At age 17 McKenzie arrived in Dakota Territory in the United States. He worked as part of the construction crew on the Northern Pacific railroad between Fargo and Bismarck. In 1873, he decided to settle in Bismarck, marrying Maryanne Hayes from Brainerd, Minnesota. Together they bore three children, May, Mary Anne, and John Alexander. John Alexander died at the age of nine.

=== Political career ===
After the sheriff drowned in the Missouri River, McKenzie was appointed as the sheriff of Burleigh County, North Dakota. He served as sheriff from 1874 to 1886, being elected five times. During this time he was also a deputy U.S. marshal. In 1883 he became an influential figure in Dakota Territory, becoming a confidant of many leading political figures of the territory, including Governor Nehemiah Ordway. In the new state of North Dakota, he personally selected many Republican candidates for the state legislature, the U.S. Senate, and the U.S. House of Representatives. He was the Republican National Committeeman for North Dakota for 21 years.

McKenzie built and ran a powerful political organization in North Dakota. However, the "McKenzie machine" was widely accused of stealing votes, intimidating voters, and physically beating opponents.

=== Alaska gold mines and a jail sentence ===
In 1900, McKenzie secured the appointment of his hand-picked candidates for the federal judge, federal district attorney, and other government posts in the gold-rush boom town of Nome, Alaska. He then traveled to Nome with the federal law-enforcement apparatus at his command where his obedient judge Noyes took gold mines from their rightful owners and illegally appointed McKenzie as the receiver to operate the mines while the owners appealed.

While McKenzie mined their gold, the original owners of the gold mines took their case to the Ninth Circuit Court of Appeals in far-away San Francisco. The appeals court finally reversed the federal judge in Nome and ordered McKenzie to return the gold he had received. McKenzie refused to comply with the order of the appeals court, and continued taking and keeping gold out of the mines.

The Ninth Circuit Court of Appeals had McKenzie arrested, found him guilty of contempt of court, and sentenced him to one year in jail, of which he served three months. He was pardoned by President William McKinley (R) in May, 1901.

=== Later years ===
North Dakota voted out the McKenzie machine in 1906. McKenzie retired from his position as party national committeeman in 1908.

McKenzie died June 22, 1922, in St. Paul, Minnesota. He had six children from two marriages. McKenzie County, North Dakota was named for him, as were the towns of Alexander, North Dakota and McKenzie, North Dakota.

== Alexander McKenzie in fiction and film ==
Rex Beach's 1906 novel The Spoilers fictionalized McKenzie's attempted theft of gold mines in Nome. The novel portrayed McKenzie as the fictional character Alexander MacNamara. The novel was made into a stage play, and into five film versions. Randolph Scott played the McKenzie/Macnamara character in the 1942 film.

James A. Michener's novel Alaska bases a key fictional character of chapter 9 on McKenzie's Nome dealings .

== See also ==
- List of people pardoned or granted clemency by the president of the United States
