= Ellsworth, Michigan =

- Village
- Village of Ellsworth
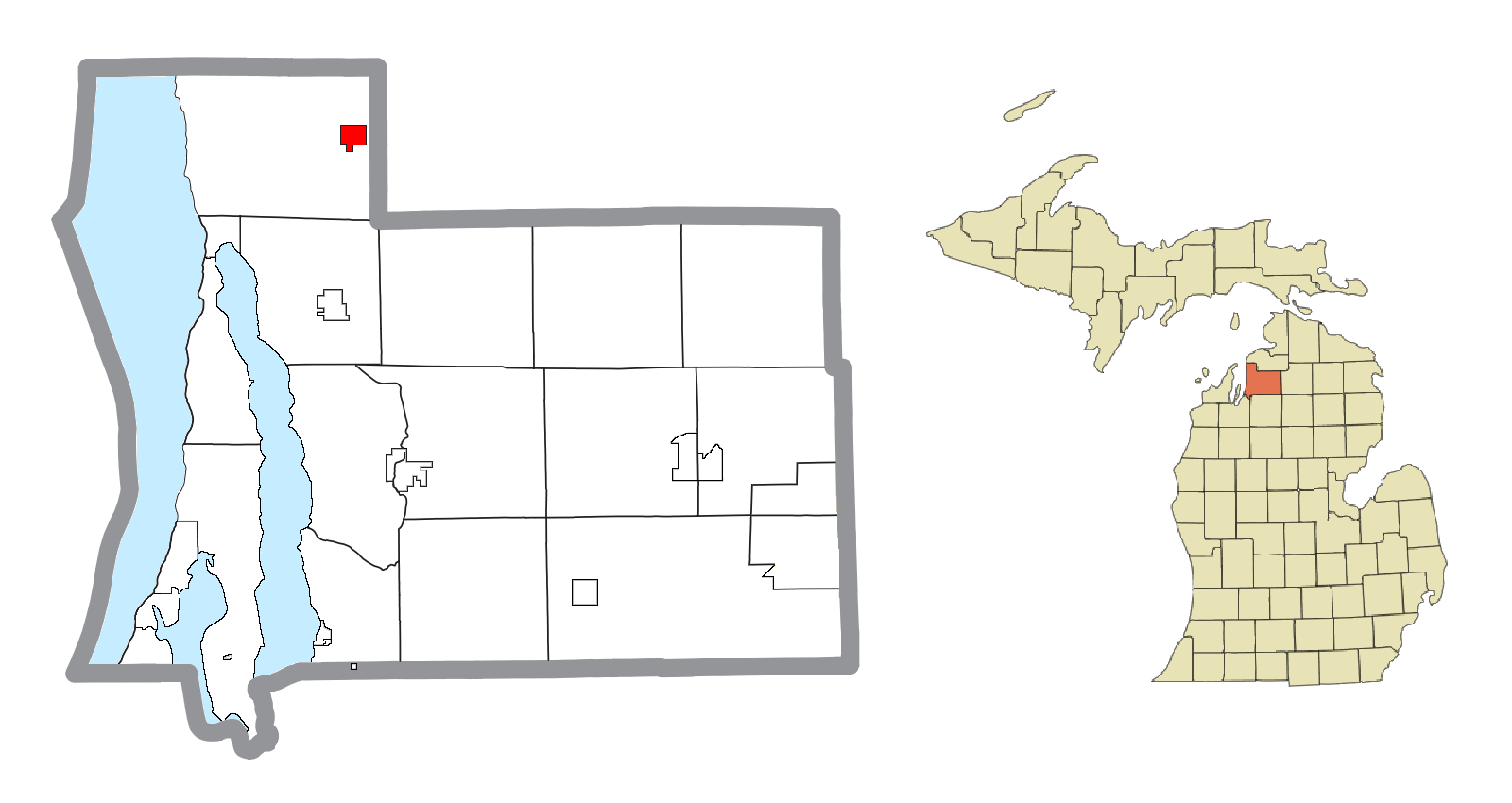
- Location within Antrim County

- Location within the state of Michigan
- Coordinates: 45°10′04″N 85°14′42″W
- Country: United States
- State: Michigan
- County: Antrim
- Township: Banks
- Incorporated: 1938

Government
  - Type: Village council
  - President: Hugh Campbell
  - Clerk: Marlene Drenth

Area
  - Total: 0.83 sq mi (2.14 km^{2})
  - Land: 0.75 sq mi (1.94 km^{2})
  - Water: 0.081 sq mi (0.21 km^{2})
- Elevation: 659 ft (201 m)

Population (2020)
  - Total: 367
  - Density: 490.9/sq mi (189.55/km^{2})
- Time zone: UTC-5 (Eastern (EST))
  - Summer (DST): UTC-4 (EDT)
- ZIP code(s): 49729
- Area code: 231
- FIPS code: 26-25420
- GNIS feature ID: 0625495
- Website: villageofellsworthmi.com

Ellsworth is a village in Antrim County in the U.S. state of Michigan. The population was 367 at the 2020 census. The village is located within Banks Township.

The village is primarily a bedroom community with its primary industry being gravel and other aggregates. Agriculture and forestry are also important industries. Ellsworth is home to a small annual festival called the Pig Roast, which involves a parade and horse pulls and roast pork. Ellsworth is the seat of Banks Township, which also includes the community of Atwood and several cherry orchards. Ellsworth's main governing body is the Ellsworth Village Council. The town is named after Elmer Ephraim Ellsworth, the first Union officer to die in the American Civil War.

== History ==
The village of Ellsworth was founded in 1881. It quickly took in the previous villages of Needmore and Ox Bow. It was incorporated as a village in 1938.

== Geography ==
According to the United States Census Bureau, the village has a total area of 0.80 square miles (2.07 km^{2}), of which 0.72 square miles (1.86 km^{2}) is land and 0.08 square miles (0.21 km^{2}) is water.

Ellsworth is about 40 miles (64 km) northeast of Traverse City.

== Demographics ==
Historical population
Census	Pop.	Note	%±
1940	347		—
1950	369		6.3%
1960	386		4.6%
1970	362		−6.2%
1980	436		20.4%
1990	418		−4.1%
2000	483		15.6%
2010	349		−27.7%
2020	367		5.2%
U.S. Decennial Census

=== 2010 census ===
As of the census of 2010, there were 349 people, 142 households, and 100 families residing in the village. The population density was 484.7 inhabitants per square mile (187.1/km^{2}). There were 186 housing units at an average density of 258.3 per square mile (99.7/km^{2}). The racial makeup of the village was 97.1% White, 0.6% African American, 0.9% from other races, and 1.4% from two or more races. Hispanic or Latino of any race were 0.6% of the population.

There were 142 households, of which 30.3% had children under the age of 18 living with them, 58.5% were married couples living together, 10.6% had a female householder with no husband present, 1.4% had a male householder with no wife present, and 29.6% were non-families. 28.2% of all households were made up of individuals, and 11.9% had someone living alone who was 65 years of age or older. The average household size was 2.42 and the average family size was 2.94.

The median age in the village was 42.9 years. 24.9% of residents were under the age of 18; 4.7% were between the ages of 18 and 24; 22.6% were from 25 to 44; 32.4% were from 45 to 64; and 15.5% were 65 years of age or older. The gender makeup of the village was 47.9% male and 52.1% female.

=== 2000 census ===
As of the census of 2000, there were 483 people, 174 households, and 132 families residing in the village. The population density was 652.9 inhabitants per square mile (252.1/km^{2}). There were 204 housing units at an average density of 275.8 per square mile (106.5/km^{2}). The racial makeup of the village was 96.48% White, 0.21% African American, 0.41% Native American, 1.04% from other races, and 1.86% from two or more races. Hispanic or Latino of any race were 1.04% of the population.

There were 174 households, out of which 43.1% had children under the age of 18 living with them, 61.5% were married couples living together, 10.3% had a female householder with no husband present, and 24.1% were non-families. 20.7% of all households were made up of individuals, and 11.5% had someone living alone who was 65 years of age or older. The average household size was 2.78 and the average family size was 3.17.

In the village, the population was spread out, with 31.1% under the age of 18, 7.5% from 18 to 24, 29.8% from 25 to 44, 21.1% from 45 to 64, and 10.6% who were 65 years of age or older. The median age was 33 years. For every 100 females, there were 96.3 males. For every 100 females age 18 and over, there were 91.4 males.

The median income for a household in the village was $38,125, and the median income for a family was $45,694. Males had a median income of $34,375 versus $26,719 for females. The per capita income for the village was $16,781. About 5.5% of families and 7.3% of the population were below the poverty line, including 9.2% of those under age 18 and 19.0% of those age 65 or over.
