= The Recoil (1924 film) =

1924 film by T. Hayes Hunter

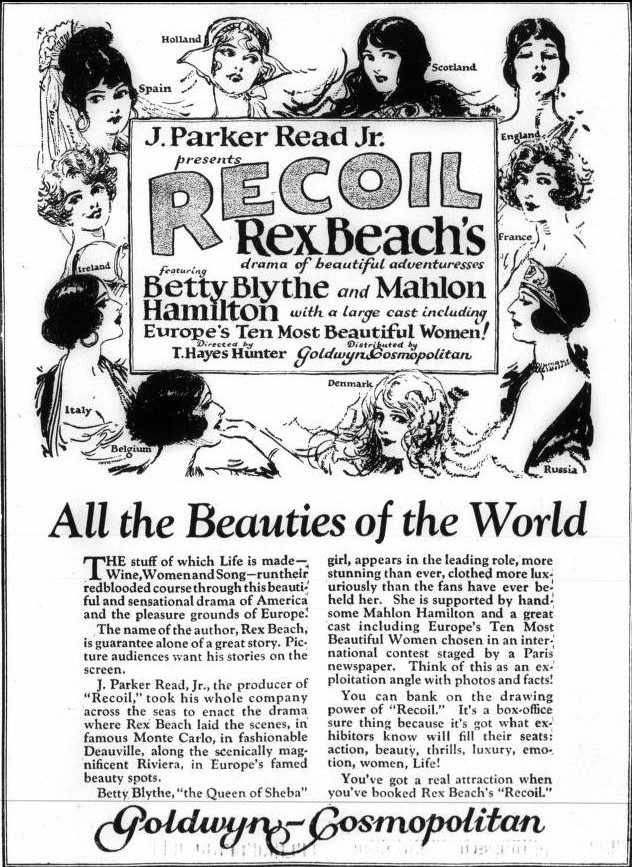
- Advertisement
- Directed by: T. Hayes Hunter
- Written by: Gerald Duffy (scenario)
- Story by: Rex Beach
- Produced by: Goldwyn Pictures Corporation; J. Parker Read
- Starring: Mahlon Hamilton; Betty Blythe
- Cinematography: Rene Guissart
- Edited by: Alex Troffey
- Distributed by: Goldwyn Pictures
- Release date: April 27, 1924
- Running time: 70 minutes
- Country: United States
- Language: Silent (English intertitles)

The Recoil is a 1924 American silent drama film directed by T. Hayes Hunter based on a Rex Beach story. Mahlon Hamilton and Betty Blythe star. Blythe filmed some scenes for the picture in Paris in November 1923.

== Plot ==
As described in a film magazine review, Gordon Kent, an enormously wealthy American, comes from South America to paint Europe red with wild parties with beautiful women and where champagne flows from fountains. In Deauville he meets and loves Norma Selbee, a penniless American who rings herself in during one of Kent's lavish parties. They marry, but despite receiving showered attentions from her husband, Norma elopes with the wily adventurer Marchmont. William Sothern, Kent's famous detective friend, discloses that Marchmont is a crook, and that Norma's crook husband Jim Selbee is still alive. Kent revenges himself by forcing Marchmont and Noima to always live together under penalty of his turning both over to the police. The two wander over Europe and hate one another. In New York, Jim Selbee tries to blackmail Kent. Norma warns him. Selbee is killed by Marchmont, and Kent, regretting his actions, takes Norma with him to happiness in South America.

== Cast ==
- Mahlon Hamilton as Gordon Kent
- Betty Blythe as Norma Selbee
- Clive Brook as Marchmont
- Fred Paul as William Southern
- Ernest Hilliard as Jim Selbee

== Preservation ==
The film has been preserved by MGM.

== See also ==
- White Shoulders (1931)
