= The Spoilers (1923 film) =

1923 film

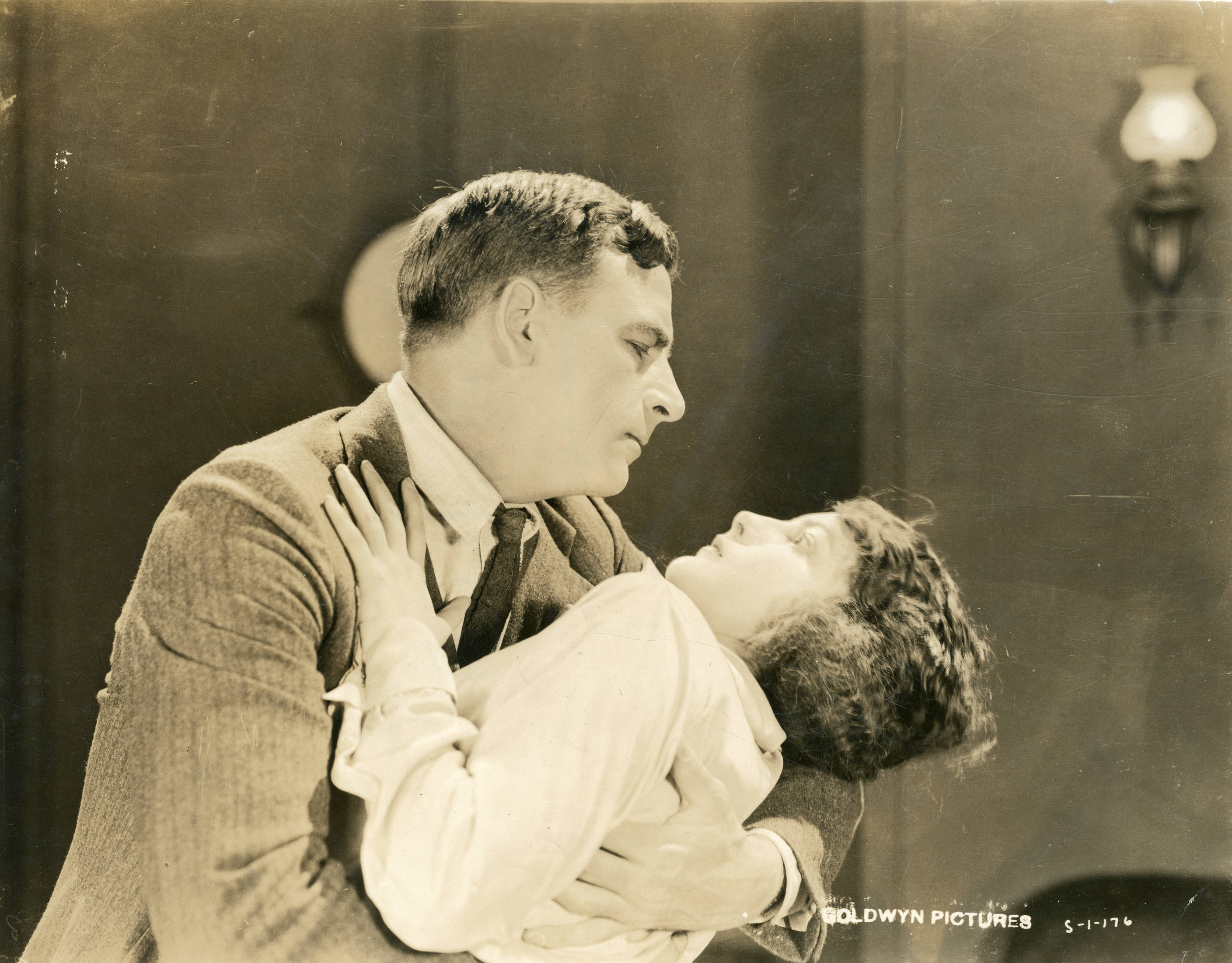
- Film still
- Directed by: Lambert Hillyer
- Written by: Elliott J. Clawson
- Based on: The Spoilers; 1906 novel/play by Rex Beach
- Produced by: Jesse D. Hampton
- Starring: Milton Sills; Anna Q. Nilsson; Noah Beery Sr.
- Cinematography: John Stumar; Dwight Warren
- Production company: Jesse D. Hampton Productions
- Distributed by: Goldwyn Pictures
- Release date: August 5, 1923
- Running time: 80 minutes; 8,020 feet
- Country: United States
- Languages: Silent; English intertitles

The Spoilers is a 1923 American silent Western film directed by Lambert Hillyer. It is set in Nome, Alaska during the 1898 Gold Rush, with Milton Sills as Roy Glennister, Anna Q. Nilsson as Cherry Malotte, and Noah Beery Sr. as Alex McNamara. The film culminates in a saloon fistfight between Glennister and McNamara.

The Spoilers was adapted to screen by Elliott J. Clawson from the 1906 Rex Beach novel of the same name. Film versions also appeared in 1914, in 1930 (with Gary Cooper as Glennister and Betty Compson as Cherry Malotte), in 1942 (with John Wayne as Glennister, Marlene Dietrich as Malotte, and Randolph Scott as McNamara), and finally in 1955 with Anne Baxter as Malotte, Jeff Chandler as Glennister and Rory Calhoun as McNamara.

The character of Cherry Malotte also appears in Beach's The Silver Horde (1930), portrayed by Evelyn Brent.

== Cast ==
- Milton Sills as Roy Glennister
- Anna Q. Nilsson as Cherry Malotte
- Barbara Bedford as Helen Chester
- Robert Edeson as Joe Dextry
- Ford Sterling as Slapjack Simms
- Wallace MacDonald as Broncho Kid
- Noah Beery Sr. as Alex McNamara
- Mitchell Lewis as Marshall Voorhees
- John Elliott as Bill Wheaton, Attorney
- Robert McKim as Struve
- Rockliffe Fellowes as Matthews

== Preservation ==
A print of The Spoilers is maintained in the film archives at Gosfilmofond in Moscow and the Centre National du Cinéma at Fort de Bois-d'Arcy.
