= Rex Beach =

American writer and water polo player

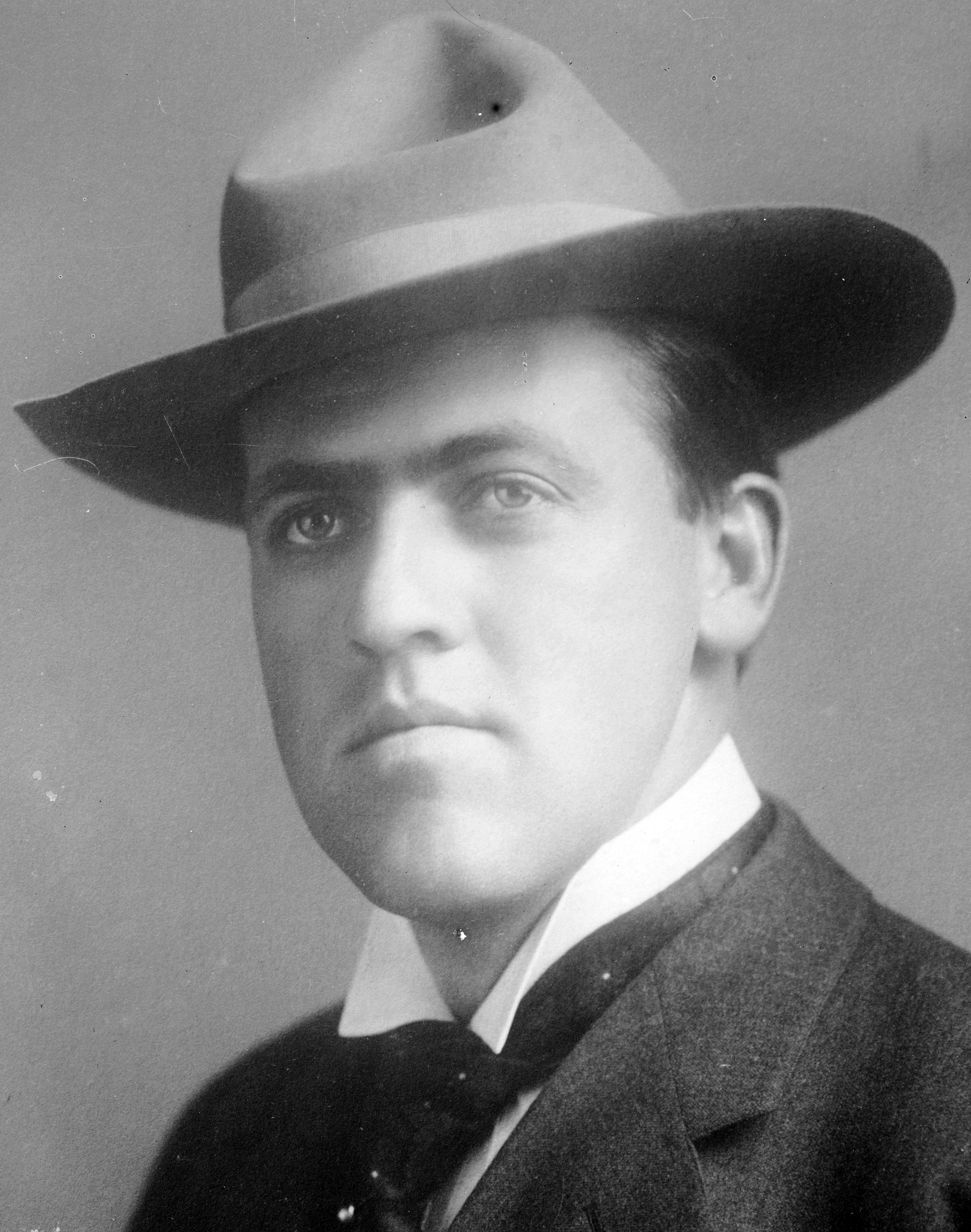
- Born: Rex Ellingwood Beach; September 1, 1877; Atwood, Michigan, U.S.
- Died: December 7, 1949 (aged 72); Sebring, Florida, U.S.
- Education: Rollins College; Chicago College of Law; Kent College of Law
- Occupations: Novelist, playwright

Rex Ellingwood Beach (September 1, 1877 – December 7, 1949) was an American novelist, playwright, and Olympic water polo player. Many of his novels were adapted into films.

== Early life ==
Rex Beach was born in Atwood, Michigan, and moved to Tampa, Florida, with his family where his father was growing fruit trees. Beach studied at Rollins College, Florida (1891–1896), the Chicago College of Law (1896–97), and Kent College of Law, Chicago (1899–1900).

== 1904 Olympic medal ==
Medal record

Men's water polo

Representing the United States

Olympic Games
Silver medal – second place	1904 St. Louis	Water Polo competition

Beach played water polo for the Chicago Athletic Association (CAA) under Coach John Robinson during his law school years in Chicago. Beach was a member of the water polo team which won the silver medal in the 1904 Summer Olympics in St. Louis.

== Writing career ==
In 1900 he was drawn to Alaska at the time of the Klondike Gold Rush. After five years of unsuccessful prospecting, he turned to writing. His second novel The Spoilers (1906) was based on a true story of corrupt government officials stealing gold mines from prospectors, which he witnessed while he was prospecting in Nome, Alaska. The Spoilers became one of the best selling novels of 1906.

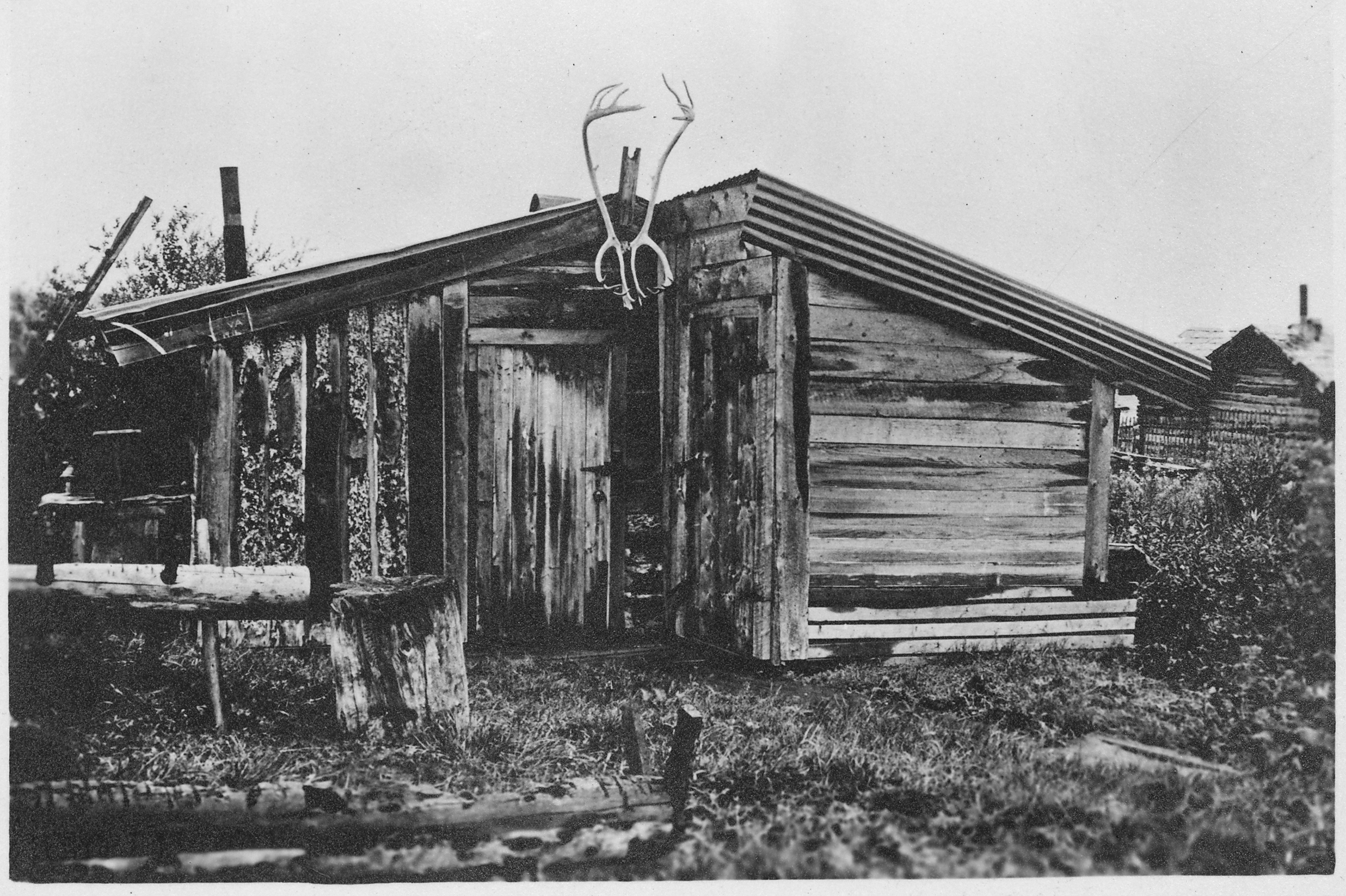
Rex Beach Cabin, Rampart, Alaska

His adventure novels, influenced by Jack London, were immensely popular throughout the early 1900s. Beach was lionized as the "Victor Hugo of the North", but others found his novels formulaic and predictable. Critics described them as cut from the "he-man school" of literature. Historian Stephen Haycox has said that many of Beach's works are "mercifully forgotten today".

One novel, The Silver Horde (1909), is set in Kalvik, a fictionalized community in Bristol Bay, Alaska, and tells the story of a down on his luck gold miner who discovers a greater wealth in Alaska's run of salmon (silver horde) and decides to open a cannery. To accomplish this he must overcome the relentless opposition of the "salmon trust", a fictionalized Alaska Packers' Association, which undercuts his financing, sabotages his equipment, incites a longshoremen's riot and bribes his fishermen to quit. The story line includes a love interest as the protagonist is forced to choose between his fiancée, a spoiled banker's daughter, and an earnest roadhouse operator, a woman of "questionable virtue". Real-life cannery superintendent Crescent Porter Hale has been credited with being the inspiration for The Silver Horde, but it is unlikely Beach and Hale ever met.

After success in literature, many of his works were adapted into successful films; The Spoilers became a stage play, then was remade into movies five times from 1914 to 1955, with Gary Cooper and John Wayne each playing "Roy Glennister" in 1930 and 1942, respectively.

The Silver Horde was twice made into a movie, as a silent film in 1920 starring Myrtle Stedman, Curtis Cooksey and Betty Blythe and directed by Frank Lloyd; and a talkie version The Silver Horde (1930) that starred Jean Arthur, Joel McCrea, and Evelyn Brent and was directed by George Archainbaud.

Beach occasionally produced his films and also wrote a number of plays to varying success. In 1926 Beach was paid $25,000 (~$353,664 in 2024) to write a brochure entitled The Miracle of Coral Gables to promote the real estate development of Coral Gables, Florida, a planned city.

== Death and legacy ==
Rex Beach moved to Sebring in the 1920s, where he lived at the Harder Hall Hotel before buying a home in town in 1929. In 1949, two years after the death of his wife Edith, Beach committed suicide in Sebring, Florida at the age of 72. In 2005, when the home Beach lived in was remodeled, a bullet was found in the wall, believed to be the bullet that ended his life.

Beach served as the first president of the Rollins College Alumni Association. He and his wife are buried in front of the Alumni house.

Beach, and his most famous novel, were commemorated in 2009 by the naming of a public pedestrian/bicycle trail in Dobbs Ferry, NY, a former place of residence. The trail is called "Spoilers Run".

== Novels ==
- Pardners (1905) (10 short stories)
- The Spoilers (1906)
- The Barrier (1908)
- The Silver Horde (1909)
- Going Some (1910)
- The Ne'er-Do-Well (1911)
- The Net (1912)
- The Iron Trail (1913)
- The Auction Block (1914)
- Heart of the Sunset (1915)
- Rainbow's End (1916)
- The Crimson Gardenia (1916) (short stories)
- Laughing Bill Hyde (1917) (short stories)
- The Winds of Chance (1918)
- Too Fat to Fight (1919)
- Oh, Shoot (1921)
- Flowing Gold (1922)
- Big Brother (1923)
- North of Fifty-Three (1925)
- The Goose Woman
- Padlocked
- The Mating Call
- Don Careless and Birds of Prey (1928)
- Son of the Gods (1929)
- Money Mad
- Men of the Outer Islands
- Beyond Control
- Alaskan Adventures
- Hands of Dr. Locke
- Masked Women
- Wild Pastures
- Jungle Gold
- Valley of Thunder
- The World in His Arms (1946)

== Films based on his novels ==
- The Spoilers (dir. Colin Campbell, 1914)
- The Ne'er-Do-Well (dir. Colin Campbell, 1916)
- Pardners (1917)
- The Barrier (dir. Edgar Lewis, 1917)
- The Auction Block (dir. Laurence Trimble, 1917)
- Heart of the Sunset (dir. Frank Powell, 1918)
- Laughing Bill Hyde (dir. Hobart Henley, 1918)
- The Silver Horde (dir. Frank Lloyd, 1920)
- The Iron Trail (dir. Roy William Neill, 1921)
- Fair Lady (dir. Kenneth Webb, 1922) — based on The Net
- The Ne'er-Do-Well (dir. Alfred E. Green, 1923)
- The Spoilers (dir. Lambert Hillyer, 1923)
- Big Brother (dir. Allan Dwan, 1923)
- Flowing Gold (dir. Joseph De Grasse, 1924)
- The Recoil (dir. T. Hayes Hunter, 1924)
- A Sainted Devil (dir. Joseph Henabery, 1924) — based on Rope's End
- The Goose Woman (dir. Clarence Brown, 1925)
- Winds of Chance (dir. Frank Lloyd, 1925)
- The Auction Block (dir. Hobart Henley, 1926)
- The Barrier (dir. George Hill, 1926)
- Padlocked (dir. Allan Dwan, 1926)
- The Michigan Kid (dir. Irvin Willat, 1928)
- The Mating Call (dir. James Cruze, 1928)
- Son of the Gods (dir. Frank Lloyd, 1930)
- The Spoilers (dir. Edwin Carewe, 1930)
- The Silver Horde (dir. George Archainbaud, 1930)
- White Shoulders (dir. Melville W. Brown, 1931) — based on The Recoil
- Young Donovan's Kid (dir. Fred Niblo, 1931) — based on Big Brother
- The Past of Mary Holmes (dir. Harlan Thompson and Slavko Vorkapich, 1933) — based on The Goose Woman
- The Barrier (dir. Lesley Selander, 1937)
- Flowing Gold (dir. Alfred E. Green, 1940)
- The Spoilers (dir. Ray Enright, 1942)
- The Michigan Kid (dir. Ray Taylor, 1947)
- The Avengers (dir. John H. Auer, 1950) — based on Don Careless
- The World in His Arms (dir. Raoul Walsh, 1952)
- The Spoilers (dir. Jesse Hibbs, 1955)
