= Judge Moore =

Judge Moore may refer to:

- Ben Moore (judge) (1891–1958), judge of the United States District Court for the Southern District of West Virginia
- George Moore (Missouri judge) (1878–1962), judge of the United States District Court for the Eastern District of Missouri
- George DeGraw Moore (1822–1891), surrogate for Essex County, New Jersey
- George Fletcher Moore (1798–1886), Australian judge before serving as Attorney-General of Western Australia
- John H. Moore II (1929–2013), judge of the United States District Court for the Middle District of Florida
- Joseph B. Moore (Michigan judge) (1845–1930), judge of the Michigan Sixth Circuit Court
- Karen Nelson Moore (born 1948), judge of the United States Court of Appeals for the Sixth Circuit
- K. Michael Moore (born 1951), judge of the United States District Court for the Southern District of Florida
- Kimberly A. Moore (born 1968), judge of the United States Court of Appeals for the Federal Circuit
- Leonard P. Moore (1898–1982), judge of the United States Court of Appeals for the Second Circuit
- Raymond P. Moore (born 1953), judge of the United States District Court for the District of Colorado
- William Theodore Moore Jr. (born 1940), judge of the United States District Court for the Southern District of Georgia

== See also ==
- Justice Moore (disambiguation)
