= Winds of Chance =

1925 film

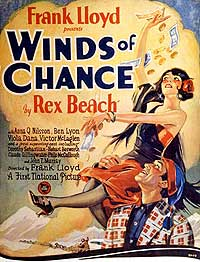
- Theatrical poster
- Directed by: Frank Lloyd
- Screenplay by: J. G. Hawks (adaptation)
- Based on: Winds of Chance by Rex Beach
- Starring: Anna Q. Nilsson; Ben Lyon
- Cinematography: Norbert F. Brodin
- Production company: First National Pictures
- Distributed by: First National Pictures
- Release date: August 16, 1925 (U.S. theatrical)
- Running time: 100 minutes
- Country: United States
- Language: Silent (English intertitles)

Winds of Chance is a 1925 American silent drama film directed by Frank Lloyd and produced and released by First National Pictures.

== Plot ==
As described in a film magazine reviews, when Pierce Phillips finds he has no money to meet the government's requirements in seeking gold, he works as a packer of supplies for other adventure seekers. He meets and falls in love with the Countess Courteau. When he asks her to be his wife, he finds she has a husband. He joins a traveling show, one member of which, Laure, has fallen in love with him. She becomes hostile when he pays his attentions to Rouletta, daughter of the gambler. Laure conspires with Count Courteau, who has returned and who now believes that Phillips is his wife's lover. Phillips then works in the trading post, weighing the gold dust of the miners. He is charged with short-changing Courteau and arrested. The Countess pretends reconciliation with her husband in order to get the proof of Phillips’ innocence and threatens to expose him and have him driven out unless he confesses to the police. On his way to do so he is killed by one of the McCaskeys, who flee across the border. ’Poleon Doret, who has befriended Phillips, pursues with a police officer, and captures one of the brothers, proving Phillips’ innocence of the charge of murder which had been placed against him. ’Poleon and Rouletta, whom he had also befriended, get married, leaving the way open for Phillips and the Countess to follow their example.

== Cast ==
- Anna Q. Nilsson as Countess Courteau
- Ben Lyon as Pierce Phillips
- Viola Dana as Rouletta Kirby
- Hobart Bosworth as Sam Kirby
- Victor McLaglen as Poleon Doret
- Dorothy Sebastian as Laura
- Claude Gillingwater as Tom Linton
- Charles Crockett as Jerry
- Larry Fisher as Frank McCaskey
- Fred Kohler as Joe McCaskey
- Wade Boteler as Jack McCaskey

== Preservation ==
Prints of Winds of Chance are located at the UCLA Film & Television Archive, George Eastman Museum, and National Archives of Canada (at Ottawa).

== See also ==
- The Trail of '98 (1928)
