= The Spoilers (1930 film) =

1930 film

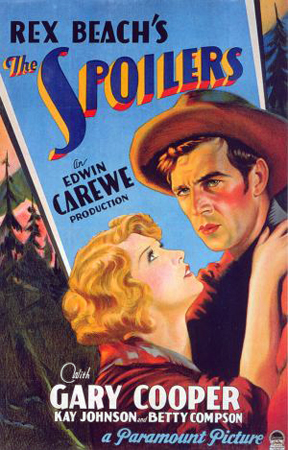
- Theatrical release poster
- Directed by: Edwin Carewe
- Written by: Bartlett Cormack; Agnes Brand Leahy
- Based on: The Spoilers; 1906 novel/play by Rex Beach
- Produced by: Edwin Carewe
- Starring: Gary Cooper; Kay Johnson; Betty Compson
- Production company: Paramount Pictures
- Distributed by: Paramount Pictures
- Release date: September 20, 1930 (US)
- Running time: 86 minutes
- Country: United States
- Language: English

The Spoilers is a 1930 American Pre-Code Western film directed by Edwin Carewe and starring Gary Cooper, Kay Johnson, and Betty Compson. Set in Nome, Alaska during the 1898 Gold Rush, the film is about a gold prospector and a corrupt Alaska politician who fight for control over a gold mine. The film features a spectacular, climactic fistfight between Cooper and William "Stage" Boyd.

The Spoilers was adapted to screen by Bartlett Cormack from the 1906 Rex Beach novel of the same name. Film versions also appeared in 1914, in 1923, in 1942, and in 1955.

== Plot ==
The official synopsis from Paramount Pictures' press kit:

In the days of the Alaskan gold rush, Roy Glenister and Joe Dextry are returning to Nome, where, with another partner, Slapjack Simms, they own a rich mine. They befriend Helen Chester, who has escaped from a quarantined ship. She is on her way to join her uncle, Judge Stillman, who, with Alec McNamara, has come to represent the law in Nome. Roy falls in love with Helen, and Cherry Malotte—a faro card game dealer in the saloon and dance hall who still loves Roy, although his affection for her had cooled before he went away—is jealous.

Backed by the government they are betraying, Stillman and McNamara begin a systematic despoiling of the richest claims. When they serve notice of ejection on Roy and his partners, Dextry wants to fight, but Roy, impressed by Helen's regard for the law, suggests engaging a good lawyer and fighting through the courts. McNamara, who wants to marry Helen, takes the partners' personal money, and Roy has to "rob" his own mine in order to send Wheaton, the lawyer, to the San Francisco Court of Appeal. Wheaton sends a messenger to recognise [sic] it. The partners hear that Helen is going to marry McNamara, and was working him when he persuaded Roy not to fight. Roy rounds up the working miners, and when they hear that McNamara is taking all the gold from the bank, they march on the building. The banker refuses to surrender the miners' money, and when they threaten violence, McNamara shoots Slapjack dead.

Meantime Helen, fearing bloodshed, goes to St. Michaels for a platoon of soldiers. Finding her uncle hastily packing to leave, Helen forces him to tell her the truth about McNamara. Stillman says that Roy is planning to attack the soldiers who have taken over his mine, but McNamara is going to dynamite the troops in the bunkhouse, knowing that Roy will be blamed. Helen rushes to the bunkhouse and gets the soldiers out. Roy sees the shack blown up, and follows the escaping McNamara to town, where he overcomes him after a terrific fight, just as Wheaton arrives with a new judge and marshal.

Cherry tells Roy that Helen was straight, but was deceived by her uncle and McNamara. Then Helen herself comes. She says she has told her uncle that she is going to marry Roy, so he will have to back her up. Roy delightedly agrees to do so.

== Cast ==
- Gary Cooper as Roy Glenister
- Kay Johnson as Helen Chester
- Betty Compson as Cherry Malotte
- William "Stage" Boyd as Alec McNamara
- Harry Green as Herman
- Slim Summerville as Slapjack Simms
- James Kirkwood as Joe Dextry
- Lloyd Ingraham as Judge Stillman
- Oscar Apfel as Struve
- George Irving as William Wheaton
- Knute Erickson as Captain Stevens
- Merrill McCormick as Miner
- Charles K. French as Man in Bar
- Jack Holmes as Voorhees
- John Beck as Hanson

== Production ==
The Spoilers was filmed on location near Oxnard, California, where a replica of Nome, Alaska during the 1900s was built.

== Reception ==
In his review for The New York Times, Mordaunt Hall gave the film a negative review for its poor narrative, unconvincing plot, and "absurdly melodramatic dialogue". Believing that the film would have benefitted from more details of the working for gold and fewer scenes in gambling halls and other places, Hall continued:

The characters are seldom real and the narrative dawdles along to a finish that is anticipated. The big fight between McNamara and Glenister, while well and vigorously acted, proved to be more amusing than thrilling ... The players give adequate performances, but what they are called upon to do and say is far from convincing. Kay Johnson is not happily cast in the part of Helen Chester, the girl who falls in love with Glenister, impersonated by Gary Cooper. Mr. Cooper does very well by his rôle, and William Boyd's portrayal of the designing McNamara is satisfactory. ... Through his attempt to give all the dozen characters a chance in this picture, Edwin Carewe's direction results in no little confusion. One never is quite sure where the persons are coming or going and the pivotal idea is scarcely credible.

Finally, Hall criticized the film's "general lack of intelligence" and the narrative, which "runs from one scene to another with too much threatening talk and an ineffectual misunderstanding between Glenister and Helen Chester, who are in love with each other."
