= The Barrier (1937 film) =

1937 film by Lesley Selander

- Directed by: Lesley Selander
- Written by: Bernard Schubert
- Based on: The Barrier by Rex Beach
- Produced by: Harry Sherman
- Starring: Leo Carrillo; Jean Parker; James Ellison; Otto Kruger; Robert Barrat; Andy Clyde
- Cinematography: George Barnes
- Edited by: Thomas Neff; Robert B. Warwick Jr.
- Music by: Gerard Carbonara
- Production company: Paramount Pictures
- Distributed by: Paramount Pictures
- Release date: November 26, 1937
- Running time: 90 minutes
- Country: United States
- Language: English

The Barrier is a 1937 American western adventure film directed by Lesley Selander and starring Leo Carrillo, Jean Parker and James Ellison. It was produced and distributed by Paramount Pictures. It is based on the 1908 novel The Barrier by Rex Beach. The story was previously filmed by MGM as a silent film of the same title in 1926. Location shooting took place in Mount Rainier National Park in Washington.

== Plot ==
In 1890, in Flambeau, a small mining town in Alaska near the Canadian border, among the inhabitants are the prospectors John Gale and "No Creek" Lee and the French fur hunter Poleon Doret. Gale, a man with a big heart, lives with an Indian woman, Alluna, and a girl, Necia, whom he treats like a daughter. In reality, Necia is the daughter of another Indian, Merridy, loved by Gale some time before, but who had married another. Bennett, her husband, had turned out to be a violent man and Merridy, trying to save her daughter from her abuse, had asked for help from Gale who had promised her to watch over the baby until she joined them after leaving her husband. But Merridy had never arrived and Gale had been charged with kidnapping the girl and murdering Merridy. Having escaped capture, Gale had gone into hiding, taking refuge in Flambeau. When the troops of the United States arrive in the city and, under the leadership of Lieutenant Burrell, create a fixed position of the army, Flambeau is all in fibrillation.

Among the newcomers is also Bennett who now uses the name of Stark. The man, for fifteen years, has been on the trail of Gale and now he intends to have him arrested and to take Necia from him. Poleon, the French, who grew up with the girl, fell in love with her, but Necia prefers the lieutenant. Alluna, however, warns her that a white man will never marry a half-breed like her. Necia, after talking to Burrell who tells her that their separation would be the best thing for her, leaves with a broken heart. Gale decides to tell the lieutenant everything to ensure a future for Necia. Stark orders Burrell to arrest him, but he must confront the miner. From the clash, the two opponents both come out injured. At the end of his life, Stark says he has taken Necia. Poleon, who hears it, runs to the river to save the girl, arriving just in time. Burrell, meanwhile, obtains Stark's confession about Merridy's murder, thus exonerating Gale who is also found not guilty by the miners' committee for Stark's death. Poleon gallantly gives Necia to Burrell and leaves Flambeau in a canoe singing a song.

== Cast ==
- Leo Carrillo as Poleon Doret
- Jean Parker as Necia Gale
- James Ellison as Lieutenant Burrell
- Otto Kruger as Stark
- J.M. Kerrigan as Sergeant Thomas
- Robert Barrat as John Gale
- Andy Clyde as 'No-Creek' Lee
- Sally Martin as Molly Gale
- Sara Haden as Mrs. John 'Alluna' Gale
- Addison Richards as Henchman Runnion
- Alan Davis as Sergeant Tobin
- Fernando Alvarado as Johnny Gale

== Bibliography ==
- Goble, Alan. The Complete Index to Literary Sources in Film. Walter de Gruyter, 1999.
- Pitts, Michael R. Western Movies: A Guide to 5,105 Feature Films. McFarland, 2012.
