= The Spoilers (1955 film) =

1955 film by Jesse Hibbs

- Film poster by Reynold Brown
- Directed by: Jesse Hibbs
- Screenplay by: Oscar Brodney; Charles Hoffman
- Based on: The Spoilers; 1906 novel/play by Rex Beach
- Produced by: Ross Hunter
- Starring: Anne Baxter; Jeff Chandler; Rory Calhoun
- Cinematography: Maury Gertsman
- Edited by: Paul Weatherwax
- Color process: Technicolor
- Production company: Universal International Pictures
- Distributed by: Universal Pictures
- Release date: December 23, 1955
- Running time: 84 minutes
- Country: United States
- Language: English
- Box office: $1.4 million (US)

The Spoilers is a 1955 American Northern film directed by Jesse Hibbs and starring Anne Baxter, Jeff Chandler and Rory Calhoun. Set in Nome, Alaska during the 1898 Gold Rush, it culminates in a spectacular saloon fistfight between Glennister (Chandler) and McNamara (Calhoun).

This is the fifth and to date final adaptation of Rex Beach's novel of the same name. Prior film versions appeared in 1914, in 1923 (with Noah Beery, Sr. as McNamara), in 1930 (with Gary Cooper as Glennister and Betty Compson as Malotte), and in 1942 (with John Wayne as Glennister, Betty Compson lookalike Marlene Dietrich as Malotte, and Randolph Scott as McNamara). The 1930 and 1942 versions were the only instances of Gary Cooper and John Wayne playing the same role in the same story in two different films; Jeff Chandler portrays the part in this version.

== Plot ==
Struggling miners Flapjack and Banty go to the office of Alex McNamara, the new gold commissioner in Nome, Alaska, to complain about claim jumpers. He isn't there, they go to Cherry Malotte's gambling saloon to get help. Cherry talks them out of rash actions for their own sake.

Cherry goes to the commissioner's office to secure men's claim for them when Alex suddenly appears. He assures her Judge Stillman is on his way to Nome to review all legal matters regarding the mines.

When a ship arrives bringing her sweetheart Roy Glennister back to town, Cherry runs out eagerly to meet it, driven by her croupier, Blackie. To her anger, Roy is traveling with an attractive stranger, Helen Chester. An irate Cherry leaves in a huff with Roy's co-owner of a nearby mine, Dextry.

Roy insists he still loves Cherry, but she slaps his face. Alex and the newly arrived Judge Stillman set out to survey and inspect Roy's mine, insisting it will take weeks before any claims can be settled. Roy is shocked to observe that Alex, the Judge and Helen are all conspirators to steal the miners' claims.

Blackie shoots the town marshal and makes sure Roy is blamed and arrested for it. A jailbreak is arranged, but Cherry rushes to warn Roy of what she has learned from Helen, that as soon as he escapes, Alex is planning to ambush Roy and make it look like a lawful shooting.

Roy ecapes and along with Dextry, Blackie and their men they attack Alex's men at the mine. After a shootout which Roy's side wins, Blackie dies and gives a deathbed confession, admitting he killed the sheriff and framed Roy. Roy rushes back to town where he finds Alex at the saloon; they get into a knockdown, drag-out fistfight, which Roy eventually wins. Cherry and Roy reunite and embrace.

== Cast ==
- Anne Baxter as Cherry Malotte
- Jeff Chandler as Roy Glennister
- Rory Calhoun as Alexander McNamara
- Ray Danton as Blackie
- Barbara Britton as Helen Chester
- John McIntire as Dextry
- Wallace Ford as Flapjack Simms
- Forrest Lewis as Banty Jones
- Carl Benton Reid as Judge Stillman
- Raymond Walburn as Mr. Skinner
- Ruth Donnelly as Duchess
- Dayton Lummis as Wheaton
- Willis Bouchey as Jonathan Struve
- Roy Barcroft as the Marshal
- Byron Foulger as Montrose aka Monty
- Robert Foulk as Bartender
- Arthur Space as Bank Manager
- Harry Seymour as Piano Player
- Bob Steele as Miner
- Eddie Parker as Berry (as Edwin Karker)
- Lee Roberts as Deputy
- John Close as Deputy

== Production ==
The film starred Anne Baxter, Jeff Chandler and Rory Calhoun. Robert Arthur was originally to produce and he supervised the script and original casting, but was replaced by Ross Hunter.

== See also ==
- List of American films of 1955
