= The Spoilers (1914 film) =

1914 film

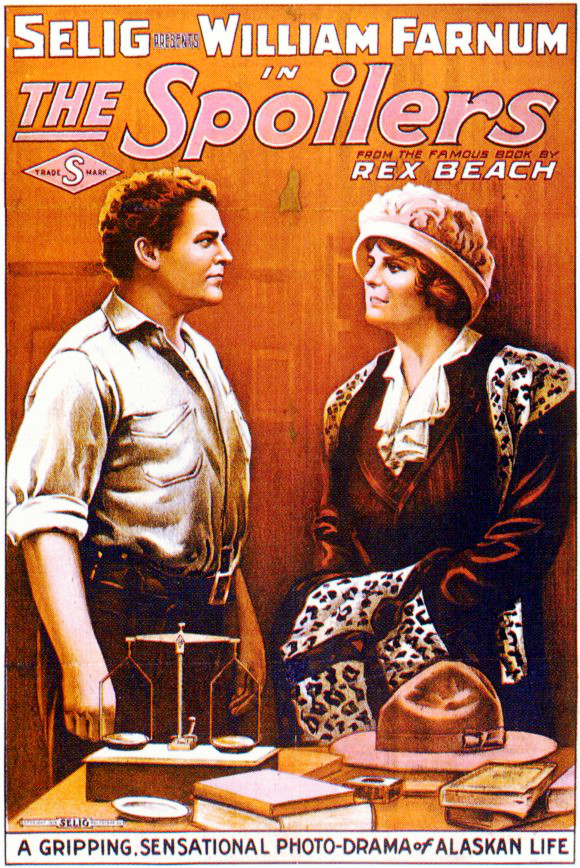
- Theatrical poster for The Spoilers
- Directed by: Colin Campbell; Alfred E. Green (asst. dir.)
- Written by: Lanier Bartlett
- Based on: The Spoilers; 1906 novel/play by Rex Beach
- Produced by: William Nicholas Selig
- Starring: William Farnum; Kathlyn Williams; Tom Santschi
- Cinematography: Harry Gerstad; Alvin Wyckoff
- Production company: Selig Polyscope Company
- Distributed by: General Film Company
- Release date: March 25, 1914
- Running time: 9 reels (1914 release); 110 minutes (1916 re-release)
- Country: United States
- Languages: Silent; English intertitles
- Box office: $1 million

The Spoilers

The Spoilers is a 1914 American silent Western film directed by Colin Campbell. The film is set in Nome, Alaska during the 1898 Gold Rush, with William Farnum as Roy Glennister, Kathlyn Williams as Cherry Malotte, and Tom Santschi as Alex McNamara. The film culminates in a spectacular saloon fistfight between Glennister and McNamara. In 1916, an expanded version was released, running 110 minutes.

The film was adapted to screen by Lanier Bartlett from the Rex Beach novel of the same name. The film was remade in 1923 (with Noah Beery as McNamara), 1930 (with Gary Cooper as Glennister and Betty Compson as Malotte), 1942 (with John Wayne as Glennister, Randolph Scott as McNamara, and Marlene Dietrich as Malotte), and 1955 (with Jeff Chandler as Glennister, Rory Calhoun as McNamara, and Anne Baxter as Malotte). All of the films feature a lengthy, intense fight sequence.

== Plot summary ==
While wealthy Alaskan mine owner Roy Glenister (William Farnum) and his partner vacation in the States, Washington politician Alex McNamara (Tom Santschi) plans a claim-jumping scheme throughout Alaska. When the envoy McNamara intends to send falls ill, his unwitting niece, Helen (Bessie Eyton), agrees to carry the documents to Alaska in his place. Upon Roy's return to Alaska, Helen soon attracts his attention –to the dismay of his longtime girlfriend, dancer Cherry (Kathlyn Williams).

== Cast ==
- William Farnum as Roy Glenister
- Kathlyn Williams as Cherry Malotte
- Thomas Santschi as Alex McNamara
- Bessie Eyton as Helen Chester
- Frank Clark as Dextry (billed; Frank M. Clark)
- Jack McDonald as Slap Jack (billed; Jack F. McDonald)
- Wheeler Oakman as Drury, The Broncho Kid
- Norval MacGregor as Judge Stillman
- William Ryno as Struve
- Marshall Farnum as Lawyer Wheatin
- Jules White
- Cleo Ridgely

== Preservation status ==
The film exists in the Raymond Rohauer (Cohen Media Group) collection in an incomplete print.
