= The Spoilers (Beach novel) =

Book by Rex Beach

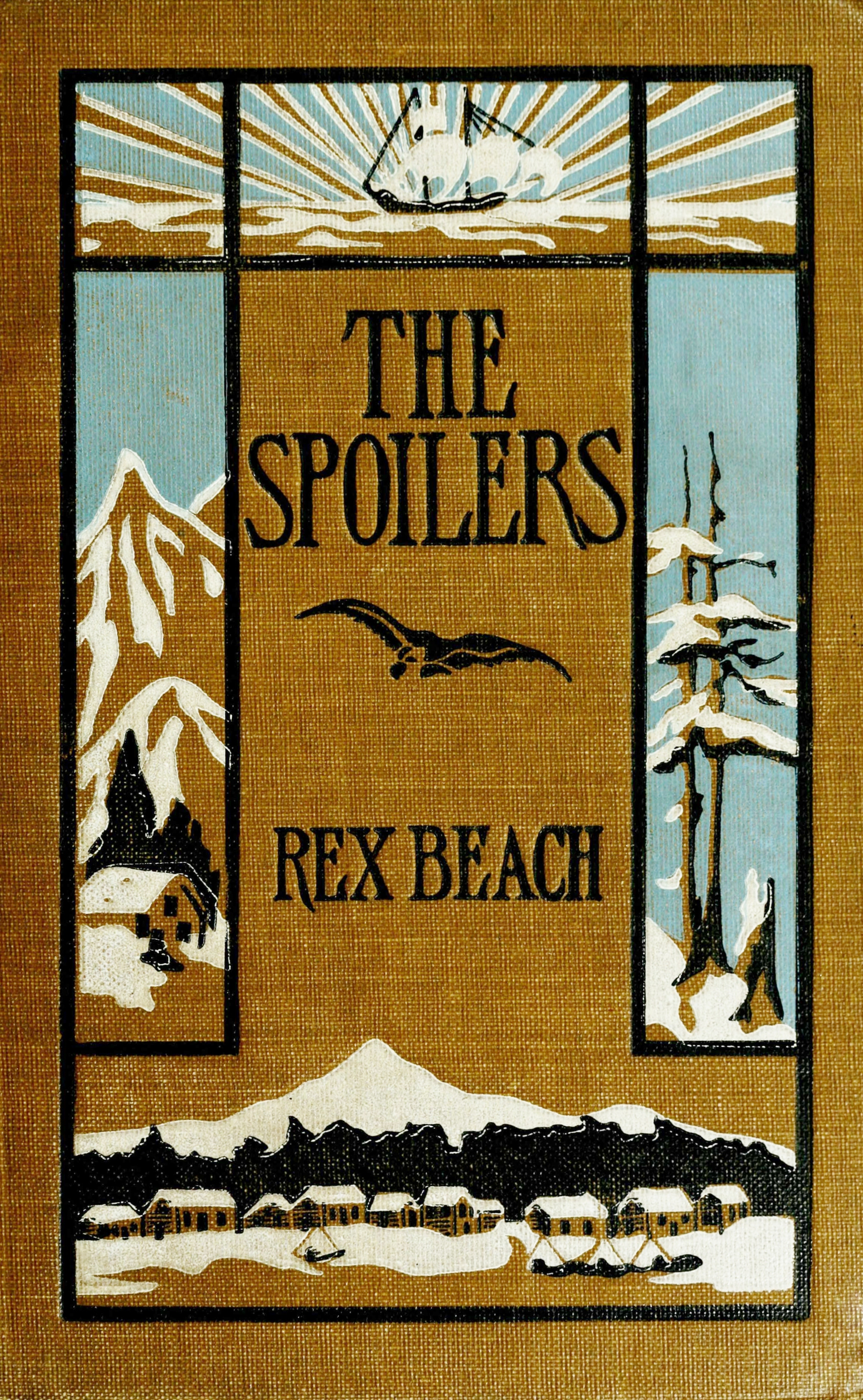
- First edition cover
- Author: Rex Beach
- Language: English
- Published: 1906
- Publication place: United States
- Pages: 313 pp

The Spoilers (1906) is a novel by Rex Beach based in Alaska that was one of the best selling novels of 1906.

The book was quickly adapted into a play, and was later adapted to film five times, in 1914, 1923, 1930, 1942, and 1955. The novel is based on a true story of corrupt government officials, such as Alexander McKenzie, seizing gold mines from prospectors, which Beach witnessed while he was prospecting in Nome, Alaska during the Nome Gold Rush.

== Plot ==
Young fearless prospector Roy Glenister and his older partner, Dextry are headed back to Nome on the first ship of the season, eager to return to protect their gold claim called the "Midas", which promises to yield them great wealth. On the trip, they defend a young woman who boards the ship from her pursuers—and who is also intent on reaching Nome as soon as possible. Glenister immediately begins to fall for the young beauty, who turns out to be Helen Chester, niece of Judge Arthur Chester, recently appointed as the first federal judge for the Alaska Territory—the "law" is coming to the wild northern frontier.

It turns out the law is crooked. The Judge and the federal marshall are under the thumb of strongman politician Alexander McNamara. After reaching Nome, McNamara succeeds in being appointed receiver of all the most lucrative mining claims in the region, based on fraudulent disputes over the validity of the miners' claims. Glenister, Dextry, and a number of naive Swedes are dispossessed of their lands. The miners hire lawyers to fight on the legal side, and form a vigilante group to fight the "law". McNamara rules ruthlessly, running the mines himself.

Glenister sinks into despair, believing that Helen is in on the conspiracy against the miners, and almost loses his stake in the Midas in a night of reckless gambling. He is only saved from that fate by Cherry Malotte, whose unrequited love for Glenister has brought her to Nome. Helen slowly learns about the scheme being perpetrated by McNamara, her uncle, and others, while her affections are torn between Glenister and McNamara.

== Historical basis ==
The novel is loosely based on actual events that occurred during the Nome Gold Rush while Rex Beach was in Nome. Beach himself documented the non-fiction version in a series titled "The Looting of Alaska", which was published in the January through May 1906 issues of Appleton's Booklovers Magazine. "Alexander Macnamara" of the novel is a fictionalized version of Alexander McKenzie, an influential behind-the-scenes politician who had the federal judge at Nome, Arthur H. Noyes, make him the receiver of valuable gold placers.

The principal victims were a trio of prospectors enviously called "the three lucky Swedes", two naturalized US citizens of Swedish birth, and a Norwegian, Japhet Lindeberg, Erik Lindblom, and John Brynteson. The scheme was halted when McKenzie was arrested by federal marshals sent to Nome by the 9th Circuit Court of Appeals in San Francisco. He served three months in jail for contempt of court before being pardoned by President McKinley.

After the death of Beach's acquaintance Frank M. Canton, obituary writers suggested Canton was a model for the novel's characters. Later historians determined that there was no direct evidence of that claim.
