= Alfred S. Moore =

American judge (1846–1920)

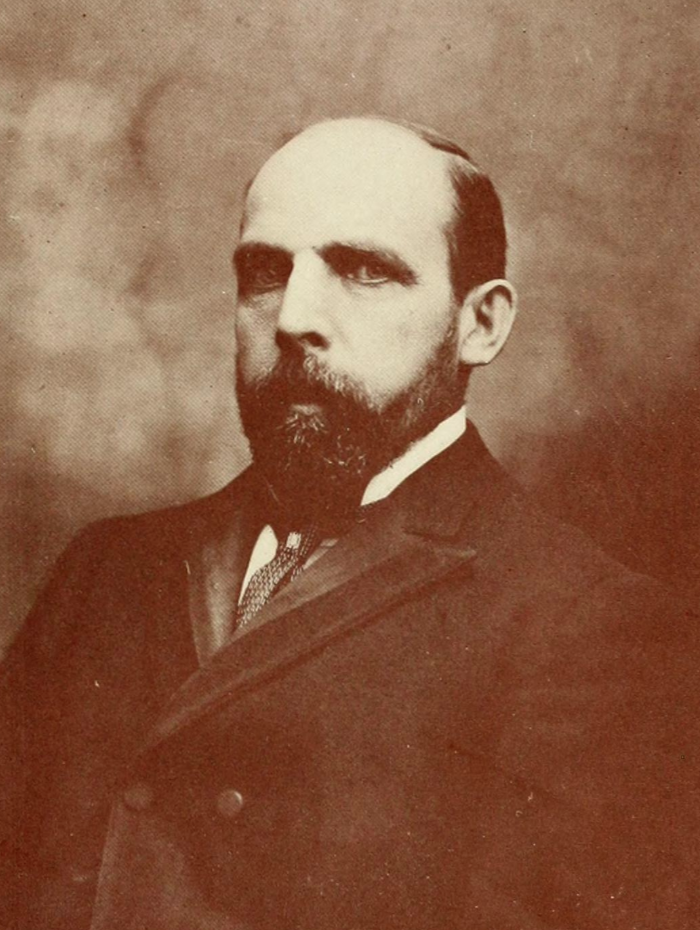
Judge Alfred S. Moore in 1905

Alfred Stibbs Moore (September 13, 1846 – January 18, 1920) was a justice of the Alaska Territorial District Court from 1902 to 1910.

== Early life, education, and career ==
Born in Beaver, Pennsylvania, Moore was educated in local public schools and Beaver Academy. He received a B.A. from Washington & Jefferson College in 1867, and later received an M.A. from the same institution.

Initially pursuing a career in the railroad industry to address health issues, Moore worked for 25 months and advanced from baggage handler to conductor of a passenger train by the age of 22. He eventually returned to Pennsylvania and studied law under prominent Beaver County attorney Sam B. Wilson. Moore gained admission to the bar on September 11, 1871, and entered practicing law in Butler County, Pennsylvania, before returning to Beaver County in 1875. In 1880, he was elected district attorney of Beaver County, a role he held for three years. Known for his legal acumen, Moore built a reputation as one of the most successful lawyers in the Beaver bar, notably never losing a case before the Supreme Court of Pennsylvania.

During the Pennsylvania oil boom, Moore frequently served as an arbitrator in oil-related litigation, demonstrating a judicial temperament that later positioned him for a role on the bench. He also held various local leadership roles, including president of the Beaver County Law Association, trustee of Beaver College for two decades, and director of the First National Bank of Beaver.

== Appointment to the Alaska bench ==
In 1902, at the suggestion of Senator Matthew Quay, President Theodore Roosevelt appointed Moore to a seat on the territorial court for the Second Judicial Division of Alaska, which had been vacated by Roosevelt's removal of Arthur H. Noyes. Moore was confirmed by the United States Senate in June 1902, and formally began his duties on July 14, 1902, in Nome, Alaska. His tenure coincided with the rapid growth of the region due to gold mining, presenting unique legal challenges.

Moore adapted to the markedly different environment and legal landscape of Alaska, which contrasted sharply with the eastern United States' settled agricultural and industrial communities. He was reappointed to the position and further served an additional year beyond his second term until his successor was appointed in 1910. After leaving Alaska in 1910, Moore returned to Beaver, Pennsylvania, where he resumed his legal practice.

== Personal life and death ==
Moore was a nephew of Pennsylvania Chief Justice Daniel Agnew. Moore was married twice and was survived by his second wife, Florinda Knox Moore, as well as a son, a daughter, and several grandchildren. Due to declining health, later in life he moved to the southern United States, and died in Spartanburg, South Carolina, at the age of 73.

Political offices
Preceded by Arthur H. Noyes	Justice of the Alaska Territorial District Court; 1902–1910	Succeeded by Cornelius D. Murane
