= Stephen Haycox =

American historian (1939 or 1940 – 2025)

Stephen Walter Haycox (1939 or 1940 – August 8, 2025) was an American historian who was a professor of history at the University of Alaska Anchorage (UAA), author, and columnist for the Anchorage Daily News. He wrote about the history of Alaska.

== Life and career ==
Haycox was born in Fort Wayne, Indiana, and went to high school in a suburb of New York. He was a musician in the Navy and served in the Pacific. He had a Ph.D. from the University of Oregon.

His book Battleground Alaska explores conflict between state's rights and federalism in environmental policy. His book Frigid Embrace contrasts the non-native Alaskans who come to the state for profit in often exploitative natural resource industries against the lifestyles of indigenous residents who are permanent residents.

Haycox was interviewed in the documentary film The Harriman Alaska Expedition Retraced. He received the Alaska Governor's Humanities Award in 2003, the University of Alaska Edith R. Bullock Prize for Excellence in 2002, was named the Alaska Historical Society's Historian of the Year in 2003. He was named a distinguished professor at UAA.

Haycox died in Seattle, Washington, on August 8, 2025, at the age of 85.

== Books ==
Haycox is the author of:

- A Warm Past: Travels in Alaska History, Fifty Essays (Press North, 1988)
- Alaska: An American Colony (University of Washington Press, 2002)
- Frigid Embrace: Politics, Economics and Environment in Alaska (Oregon State University Press, 2002)
- Battleground Alaska: Fighting Federal Power in America's Last Wilderness (University Press of Kansas, 2016)

His edited works include:

- Melvin Ricks' Alaska Bibliography: An Introductory Guide to Alaskan Historical Literature (edited with Betty J. Haycox, Alaska Historical Commission, 1977)
- An Alaska Anthology: Interpreting the Past (edited with Mary Childers Mangusso, University of Washington Press, 1996)
- Enlightenment and Exploration in the North Pacific, 1741–1805 (edited with James K. Barnett and Caedmon Liburd, Cook Inlet Historical Society, 1997)
