= The Silver Horde (1930 film) =

1930 film

- Film poster
- Directed by: George Archainbaud
- Written by: Wallace Smith (adaptation and dialogue)
- Based on: The Silver Horde; 1909 novel by Rex Beach
- Produced by: William LeBaron; William Sistrom (associate producer)
- Starring: Evelyn Brent; Louis Wolheim; Jean Arthur; Raymond Hatton and Joel McCrea
- Cinematography: Leo Tover and John W. Boyle
- Edited by: Otto Ludwig
- Production company: A Radio Picture
- Distributed by: RKO Radio Pictures Inc.
- Release dates: October 24, 1930 (Premiere-New York City); October 25, 1930 (U.S.)
- Running time: 75 minutes
- Country: United States
- Language: English
- Budget: $423,000
- Box office: $562,000

The Silver Horde (1930) by George Archainbaud

The Silver Horde is a 1930 American pre-Code romantic drama film starring Joel McCrea as a fisherman torn between two women, played by top-billed Evelyn Brent and Jean Arthur.

Directed by George Archainbaud from a screenplay by Wallace Smith, it is the second film adaptation of the 1909 novel of the same name by Rex Beach, which is a follow-up to his earlier novel, The Spoilers. The first filming of The Silver Horde was a silent 1920 film also titled The Silver Horde. The title is a reference to the salmon fishing industry in Alaska, and the color of the fish bulging in the fishermen's nets.

== Plot ==
In the Alaskan wilderness, Boyd Emerson and Fraser arrive by dogsled at a village. They are puzzled to receive a chilly welcome from its inhabitants. Frustrated, Boyd gets into a fight with local George Balt, which is broken up by Cherry Malotte. She invites the newcomers to dinner. She explains that they have stumbled into a bitter struggle between two rival fishing groups, hers and Fred Marsh's.

Boyd is ready to give up his fruitless search for gold. Cherry reinvigorates him and persuades him to join her side. She sends him, Fraser and Balt to Seattle to get a loan of $200,000 from Cherry's banker friend, Tom Hilliard, to rebuild a cannery. After concluding the deal, Boyd goes to see his socialite fiancée, Mildred Wayland. She is determined to marry him, despite her father's wish that she wed someone with wealth: none other than Fred Marsh. When Marsh provokes him, Boyd carelessly blurts out his plans. Wayne Wayland and Marsh conspire and get Cherry's financing withdrawn.

Notified, Cherry sails for Seattle and dines with Hilliard. It soon becomes plain to the banker that Cherry has fallen in love with Boyd. He explains that the young man already has a girlfriend, and points out the couple dancing elsewhere in the establishment. Cherry then secures the loan by taking up Hilliard's offer to go to his apartment. Boyd assumes, however, that it was due to Mildred's influence with her father.

Returning to Alaska with new machinery and Balt's crew, Boyd gets the cannery running in weeks, just in time for the annual salmon run. When Marsh sends his men to wreck their equipment, a brawl breaks out on the water, during which the Waylands arrive on their yacht.

Marsh tells Mildred about Cherry, that she is a notorious prostitute known from Sitka to San Francisco. He lies, telling Mildred that Cherry got the loan by spending the night with Hilliard at Boyd's insistence, and that she is more than Boyd's business partner. Mildred ends her engagement, despite Boyd's protests of innocence. Boyd, meanwhile, breaks up with Cherry when she cannot deny how she got the money.

Concerned only about Boyd's happiness, Cherry contacts an old friend in her former trade, Queenie. The two board the Wayland yacht, where Cherry proves that Queenie is Marsh's wife. Cherry then convinces Mildred that, while she loves Boyd, nothing happened between them. When Boyd shows up, Mildred is eager to take him back, but by this time, he realizes who he truly loves. He finds Cherry and tells her he cares only about their future together, not her past.

== Cast ==
- Evelyn Brent as Cherry Malotte
- Louis Wolheim as George Balt
- Jean Arthur as Mildred Wayland
- Raymond Hatton as Fraser
- Blanche Sweet as Queenie (Sweet's final screen performance)
- Gavin Gordon as Fred Marsh
- Purnell Pratt as Wayne Wayland
- William Davidson as Tom Hilliard
- Ivan Linow as Svenson
- and Joel McCrea as Boyd Emerson

Uncredited (in order of appearance)

- James Dime as Fight participant
- Dick Curtis as Fight observer
- Dennis O'Keefe as Guest at night club
- Robert Homans as Valet

Character names are not indicated in on-screen credits.

== Production ==
The film was shot on location in Ketchikan, Alaska.

== Reception ==
The film recorded a loss of $100,000.

== Copyright status ==
In 1958, the film entered the public domain in the United States because the claimants did not renew its copyright registration in the 28th year after publication.
