= Bluff =

Bluff or The Bluff may refer to:

== Places ==
=== Australia ===
- Bluff, Queensland, Australia, a town
- The Bluff, Queensland (Ipswich), a rural locality in the city of Ipswich
- The Bluff, Queensland (Toowoomba Region), a rural locality
- Bluff River (New South Wales)
- Bluff River (Murchison River), a river of Tasmania
- Bluff River (Prosser River), Tasmania; see Levendale, Tasmania
- "The Bluff", common name of Rosetta Head, a headland adjoining Victor Harbor in South Australia

=== United States ===
- Bluff, Alabama, an unincorporated community
- Bluff, Alaska, a ghost town
- The Bluff (Atlanta), Georgia, a neighborhood of Atlanta
- Bluff (Pittsburgh), Pennsylvania, a neighborhood
- Bluff, Texas, an unincorporated community
- Bluff, Utah, a town
- Bluff Creek (California), a watercourse in California that empties into Ballona Wetlands
- Bluff Creek (Des Moines River tributary), a stream in Iowa
- Bluff Creek (Cimarron River tributary), a stream in Kansas; see Clark County State Lake
- Bluff Swamp, Ascension Parish, Louisiana

=== Other places ===
- Bluff, New Zealand, a town and seaport in the South Island (colloquially known as The Bluff)
- Bluff River (New Zealand)
- Bluff, KwaZulu-Natal, South Africa, a geographical region of Durban
- Yamate, a neighborhood of Yokohama, Japan, often called "The Bluff" in English
- The Bluff, a mound near Ypres, Belgium, fought over by the British and Germans in the First World War Actions of the Bluff, 1916
- The Bluff, Bahamas, the name of three communities
- The Bluff (Cayman Islands), the highest point of the Cayman Islands, located on the island of Cayman Brac
- Bluff Island (Andaman and Nicobar Islands)
- Bluff Island (Antarctica), Prydz Bay, Antarctica
- Bluff Island (Hong Kong), Port Shelter, Sai Kung District, Hong Kong
- Scarborough Bluffs, an escarpment in the Scarborough district of Toronto, Ontario, Canada

== Game-oriented ==
- Bluff (poker), a tactic in the game of poker
- Bluff (magazine), covering poker
- A slang term for liar's dice, a dice game

== Film and TV ==
- The Bluff (film), a 2026 action thriller film
- Bluff (2007 film), a Canadian film
- Bluff (1976 film) an Italian crime-comedy film
- Bluff (1924 film), an American drama silent film
- Bluff (1916 film), an American comedy silent film directed by Rae Berger
- "Bluff" (Prison Break episode), an episode of the 2006 television series Prison Break
- Bluff (TV series), a Canadian game show broadcast by CBC Television

== People ==
- nickname of Benjamin Wade (1800–1878), American lawyer and politician
- Richard Bluff, English visual effects supervisor

== Other uses ==
- Bluff (Canadian prairies), a term in Canadian English for a group of trees on the prairies
- Bluff (geography), a steep slope or rounded cliff, usually overlooking a shoreline or other body of water
- The Bluff (album), a 2001 album by Sarah Dougher
- Bluff (novel), a 2025 novel by Francine Toon

== See also ==
- Bluff City (disambiguation)
- Bluff Hill (disambiguation)
- El Bluff, Nicaragua, a coastal port city
  - El Bluff Airport, a former airport
- BLUF (disambiguation)
- Bluffs, Illinois, a village
- Bluffton (disambiguation)
