= Bluff Creek =

Bluff Creek may refer to:

- Bluff Creek, Indiana, an unincorporated community
- Bluff Creek, Louisiana, an unincorporated community
- Bluff Creek (California), a watercourse in California that empties into Ballona Wetlands
- Bluff Creek (Des Moines River tributary), a stream in Iowa
- Bluff Creek (Cimarron River tributary), a stream in Kansas
- Bluff Creek (Minnesota River tributary), a stream in Minnesota

== See also ==
- Bluff Creek Formation
