= Anvil Creek =

Anvil Creek may refer to:

- Anvil Creek (Alaska), site of the Anvil Creek Gold Discovery Site
- Anvil Creek, New South Wales Australia, site of the former Anvil Creek Mine and now home to the Anvil Creek development in Hunter Valley

== See also ==
- Anvil Creek Gold Discovery Site
