= Bluffin =

Bluffin may refer to:

- "Bluffin" (Gucci Mane song), 2023
- "Bluffin" (Liamoo song), 2022
- "Bluffin", by Joji and the Kid Laroi from Piss in the Wind, 2026

== See also ==
- Bluffing (disambiguation)
- Bluff (disambiguation)
