= Red River National Wildlife Refuge =

United States wildlife refuge

- IUCN category IV (habitat/species management area)
- Location within the United States
- Location: Louisiana
- Nearest city: Shreveport
- Coordinates: 31°49′18″N 93°15′07″W
- Established: 2001
- Governing body: United States Fish and Wildlife Service
- Website: Red River National Wildlife Refuge

Red River National Wildlife Refuge

The Red River National Wildlife Refuge (established 2001) is a preservation project which will ultimately consist of approximately 50,000 acres (200 km^{2}) of United States federal lands and water along that section of the Red River between Colfax in Grant Parish, Louisiana, and the Arkansas state line, a distance of approximately 120 miles (190 km). Currently the refuge has acquired approximately 16,000 acres (65 km^{2}) of the proposed 50,000 acres (200 km^{2}).

The four focus areas for land purchase are:

- Lower Cane River (Natchitoches Parish)
- Spanish Lake Lowlands (Natchitoches Parish)
- Bayou Pierre Floodplain (DeSoto and Red River parishes)
- Wardview (Caddo and Bossier parishes)

== See also ==
- List of National Wildlife Refuges: Louisiana
