= Nome Gold Rush =

Gold rush in Nome, Alaska, approximately 1899–1909

Coordinates: 64°29′25″N 165°24′47″W

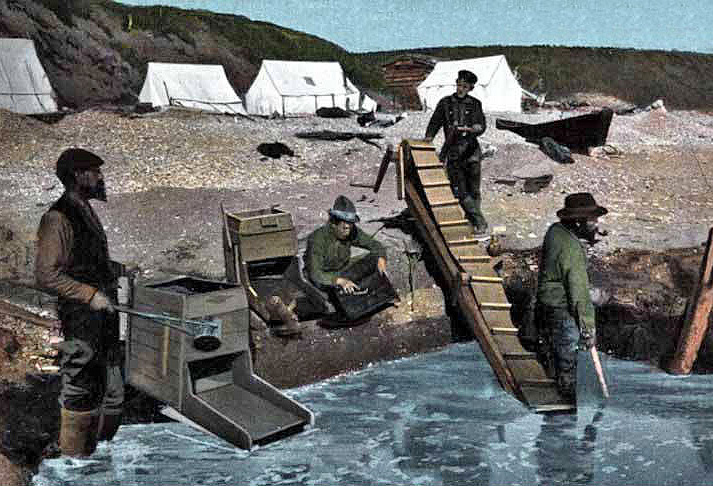
- Prospectors on Nome beach ca. 1900.
- Center: Nome, Alaska
- Discovery: September, 1898, Anvil Creek
- Duration: 1899–1909
- Goldfield: Snake River and beach at its outlet
- Legacy: North to Alaska, 1960

The Nome Gold Rush was a gold rush in Nome, Alaska, approximately 1899–1909. It is distinct from other gold rushes by the ease with which the metal could be obtained. Much of the gold was lying in the beach sand of the landing place and could be recovered without any need for a claim. Nome, a sea port without a harbor, became for a time the biggest town in Alaska.

Together with the Klondike Gold Rush (1896–1899) and Fairbanks Gold Rush (1903–1911), Nome was among the biggest gold rushes north of 60 degrees latitude on the North American continent. It shared prospectors with both Klondike and later rushes like Fairbanks. It is memorialized in films like North to Alaska. Nome City still exists and the area is mined as Nome mining district and by tourists. Total production of gold from the area is estimated to be 112 metric tons.

== History ==
=== Background ===
The center of the Nome Gold Rush was the town of Nome at the outlet of Snake River on the Seward Peninsula at Norton Sound of the Bering Sea. The Iñupiat had camped for centuries in the Nome area before Russians came. In the 18th century, they established the port of St. Michael, 125 miles (201 km) to the southeast, for sailing on the Yukon River. Fur traders and whalers from many countries visited the area. A few church missions were established beginning in the 1880s. Gold was found in smaller amounts at Council 1897, the year before Nome, and subsequently other places in the area.

=== Discovery ===
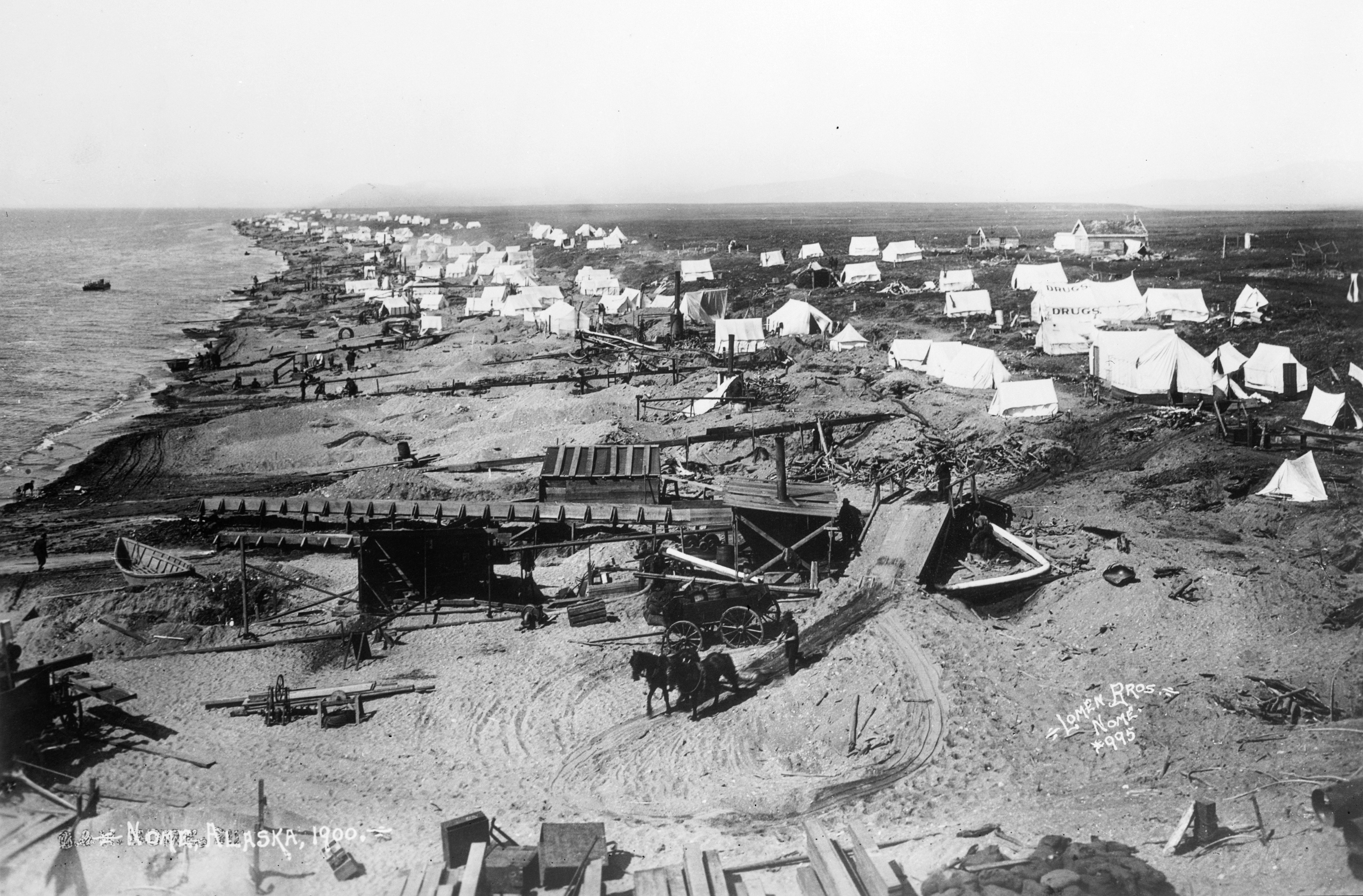
View of the beach west of Nome, 1900, with numerous tents and much mining equipment

In September 1898, the "Three Lucky Swedes": Norwegian-American Jafet Lindeberg, and two American citizens of Swedish birth, Erik Lindblom and John Brynteson, discovered gold on Anvil Creek and founded Nome mining district. News of the discovery reached the outside world that winter. By 1899, Nome had a population of 10,000 –arrivals from the Klondike gold rush. In that year, gold was found in the beach sands for dozens of miles along the coast at Nome, which spurred the stampede to new heights. Thousands more people poured into Nome during the spring of 1900 aboard steamships from the ports of Seattle and San Francisco. (Note: In 1900 a first class ticket from Seattle to Nome cost $100! But for a second class $75. Prices included a berth and meals...Each passenger was allowed 150 pounds of baggage at no cost.) More gold seekers from the distant city of Adelaide, Australia set out for Nome aboard the schooner Inca in 1902. By 1900, a tent city on the beaches and on the treeless coast reached 30 miles, from Cape Rodney to Cape Nome.

=== Claim jumping ===
Many late-comers were jealous of the original discoverers, and tried to "jump" the original claims by filing claims covering the same ground. The federal judge for the area ruled the original claims valid, but some of the claim jumpers agreed to share their invalid claims with influential U.S. politicians. One of these, Alexander McKenzie, a Republican from North Dakota, took interest in the gold rush and seized mining claims with the help of a crooked judge, Arthur H. Noyes. McKenzie's claim-jumping scheme was eventually stopped by the federal Ninth Circuit Court of Appeals; however, the episode provided the plot for Rex Beach's best-selling novel The Spoilers (1906), which was made into a stage play and movies, most famously The Spoilers (1942) starring John Wayne. Because of the unrest, Fort Davis was established 1900 at the mouth of Nome River, 4 miles east of Nome City. Major John T. Van Orsdale commanded a battalion of the 7th Infantry Regiment and the Fort Davis post, and the soldiers succeeded at restoring order.

== Mining at Nome ==
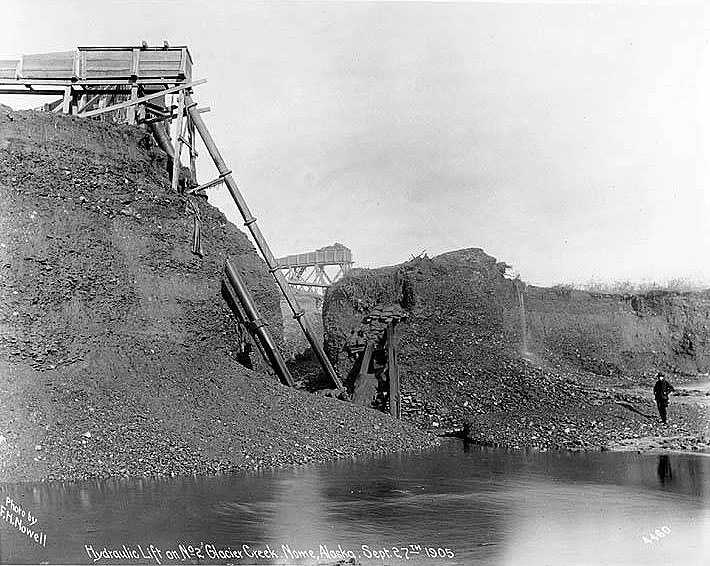
Hydraulic lift on creek, 1905

=== Beach ===
Claim jumping was mostly a problem before the beach gold was found, since it could not be claimed and there was plenty of it. As a matter of fact, the beach gold seems to have been more important than the claimed gold in the creeks. The mining of Nome beach is a textbook example of gold rushes going through phases of increasing use of machinery and capital. The very first gold on the beach was found with a pan. Later in the summer of 1899 human powered equipment like sluices and rockers were present. In 1900 small machines together with hoses and pumps were seen at the beach, and finally from around 1902 big companies took over. The season wasn't long. Due to ice, the beaches could only be worked from June to October, and local police forced people with inadequate shelter to leave for the winter.

=== Creeks ===
Panning creeks for gold in Alaska is slow and cold. As in Klondike there was a layer of permafrost just below the surface. In Nome different kinds of equipment were used to thaw the ground and suck up gravel. The mining methods used were extensive meaning that the amount of soil processed was more important than the efficiency of the equipment that separated gold from sand. By hydraulic methods soil was washed off the creek banks and into sluices either by gravity or suction. Dredges and in some cases mine shafts were used. To facilitate digging the ground was softened with steam. Steam was also used for collecting dumps of gravel in the winter. The gravel was sluiced the next summer.

== Nome City ==
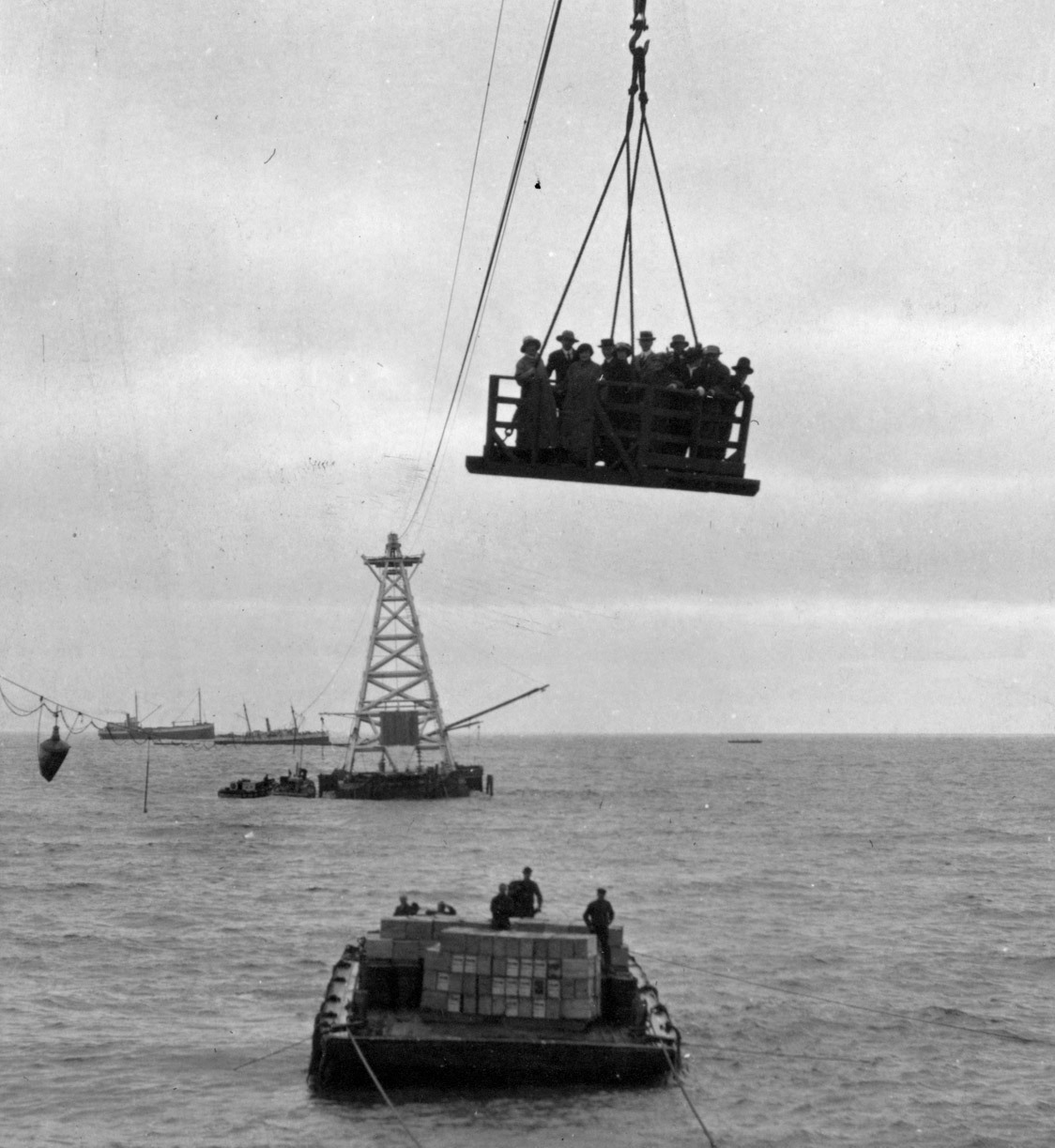
Tramway with passengers and lighter with freight (1900s)

By 1905 Nome had schools, churches, newspapers, a hospital, saloons, stores, and a post office, an electric light plant and other businesses. A hothouse on the sand-spit across the Snake River provided fresh vegetables. Some of the first automobiles in Alaska ran on the planks of Front Street. Travelers going to the mines at Council City rode in heated stages. In 1904 the first wireless telegraph in the United States to transmit over a distance of more than 100 miles began operating in Nome. Messages could be sent from Nome to St. Michael and from there by cable to Seattle.

Nome had no harbor for ships during the rush, only one for local boats. Ships simply anchored offshore and their passengers shuttled ashore in boats. In early summer the coast could still be covered with ice, in which case case passengers would be put off on the ice and brought ashore by dog sledges. In 1901 a loading crane was built, and in 1905 a wharf. This was by 1907 replaced by and/or combined with a tramway. Working in conjunction with the tramway, which was 1,400 feet (430 m) long, people and freight were more readily brought ashore by wire-pulled lighters.

== End of the Rush ==
In 1904 and 1905, gold was found in old beaches above the high-tide mark. The discovery of a second and then a third beach renewed mining close to Nome. These strikes, however, were short-lived. Between 1900 and 1909 Nome's estimated population reached as high as 20,000; in the census of 1909 the population at Nome had dropped to 2600. (Note: By the end of 1899, more than 3000 prospectors were working at Nome gold strikes. By the summer of 1900, Nome was a densely crowded tent town with more than 20,000 men working its "golden sands".) The rush was over, but gold mining continues to the present (2015) and every year prospectors arrive to look for gold. Total gold production for the Nome district is at least 3.6 million ounces, or 111.6 metric tonnes.

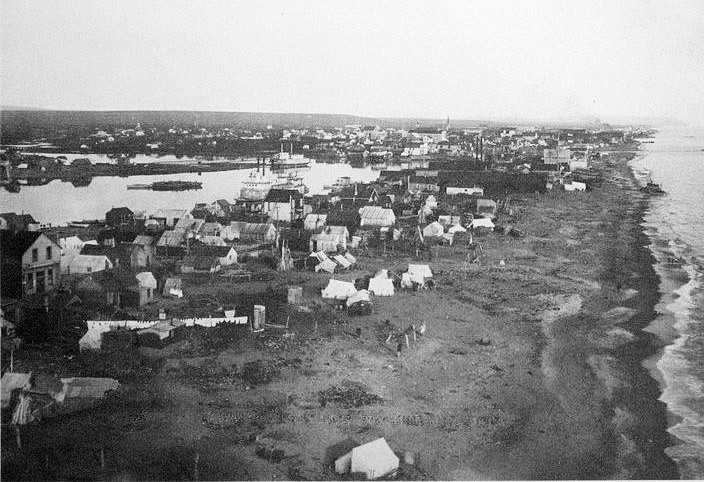
View of sand spit and Nome City 1903.

=== Financial results ===
Among the Nome prospectors at least the "Three Lucky Swedes" made a fortune. Around 1920 their mining company had made $20,000,000. An attempt to calculate how much the average beach prospector earned in 1899 gives the following figure: Estimate of gold value recovered: $2,000,000, (~$65.3 million in 2025) annual wage for a worker: $400, number of prospectors: 2,000. This yields 2.5-year of salary worth for each person. Also, saloon owners and other service providers made money during the rush. An example is Wyatt Earp, who is estimated to have returned from Nome with $80,000. A well-known prospector, Swiftwater Bill, made a fortune in both Klondike and Nome, but lost everything just as quickly.

=== Effect on Native people and nature ===
The people most affected were probably the Alaska Natives. Mining claims could only be staked lawfully by citizens. Since natives were considered to be uncivilized, they could not obtain citizenship. For them, the gold rush meant a drastic reduction in moose, caribou and small game, as prospectors hunted them for food. In many areas, gold mining resulted in destruction of salmon streams. Contact with white men also had consequences like drinking and disease.

== Legacy ==
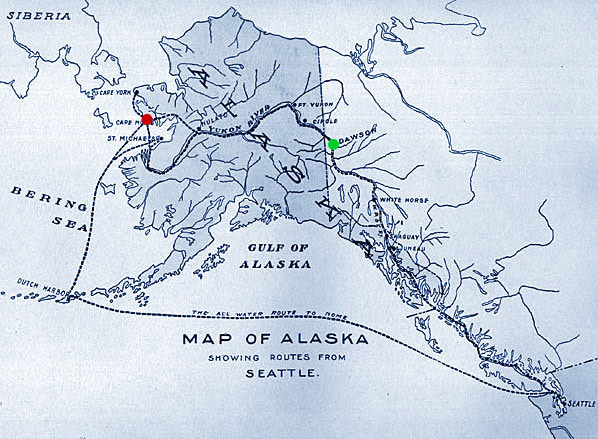
Routes from Seattle to Nome, 1901. Red: Nome. Green: Dawson

The original claim sites of the "Three Lucky Swedes" were listed on the National Register of Historic Places in 1976 (as "Anvil Creek Gold Discovery Site", "Erik Lindblom Placer Claim", and "Snow Creek Placer Claim No. 1"). In 1978, these three places, plus a fourth critical to the gold rush, were designated a National Historic Landmark District, Cape Nome Mining District Discovery Sites. The fourth site is a 0.6-mile (0.97 km) stretch of the beach on the eastern edge of the city, extending from the seawall to East Limit Road.

=== Nome and Klondike ===
The legacy of the Nome gold rush is somewhat obscured by the fame of Klondike. The two gold rushes, however, should not be confused. Both Klondike and Nome are often thought of as Alaska gold rushes, even though only Nome is actually in Alaska. The center of the Klondike gold rush was near Dawson City in the Yukon Territory, Canada and therefore outside Alaska, but the two locations are connected by the Yukon River, which has its headwaters in northern British Columbia, Canada, and eventually flows through the Yukon Territory into Alaska. Klondike River giving name to the rush is a tributary of the Yukon River, which runs through Alaska and ends in Norton Sound opposite Nome. For that reason, Yukon River too is associated with both rushes.

As mentioned earlier, there was an overlap of prospectors between Klondike and Nome and the two rushes shared some of the same routes. Prospectors came from the West coast or in the beginning from the Yukon river valley. They just had to wait for the water to be free of ice. As a curiosity, Roald Amundsen visited Nome in 1906 during his traverse of the North West passage.

=== Film ===
Five films, all entitled The Spoilers, have been produced which were set the Nome of the gold rush: in 1914 starring William Farnum, 1923 starring Noah Berry, 1930 starring Gary Cooper, 1942 with John Wayne (at third billing), and in 1955 with Jeff Chandler. The first two were silent films, and all were based on the eponymous Rex Beach novel published in 1906.

North to Alaska (1960), starring John Wayne at a rare turn at comedy, is best known for its eponymous theme song. Finally, in Wyatt Earp, a 1993 western starring Kevin Costner, Nome is briefly referred to at the ending scene.

== See also ==
- List of National Historic Landmarks in Alaska
- National Register of Historic Places listings in Nome Census Area, Alaska
