= Bluffers (disambiguation) =

Bluffers are harmless North American reptiles.

Bluffers may also refer to:

- The Bluffers, a children's cartoon series
- The Bluffers (film), a 1915 short film

== See also ==
- Bluff (disambiguation)
