= Cape Nome Mining District Discovery Sites =

- U.S. National Register of Historic Places
- U.S. National Historic Landmark District
- Alaska Heritage Resources Survey
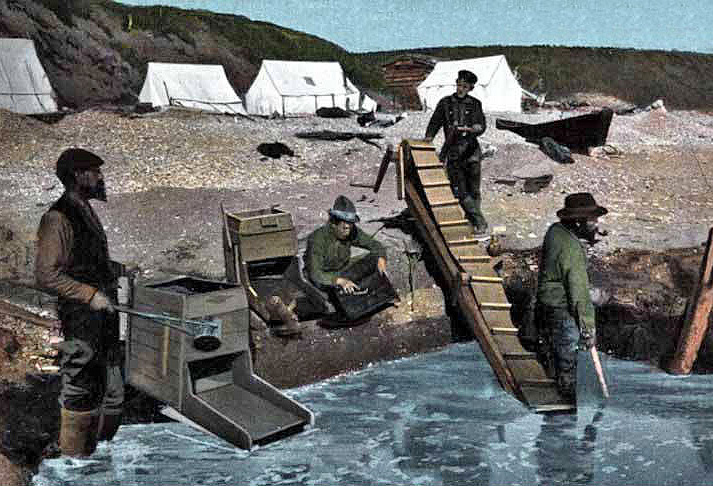
- Gold prospectors on the Nome beach, 1900

- Location within Alaska
- Nearest city: Nome, Alaska
- Coordinates: 64.54943°N 165.41278°W
- Area: 67.996 acres (27.517 ha)
- Built: 1898
- NRHP reference No.: 78000535
- AHRS No.: NOM-098

Significant dates
- Added to NRHP: June 2, 1978
- Designated NHLD: June 2, 1978

Cape Nome Mining District Discovery Sites is a National Historic Landmark located in Nome, Alaska. It was named a National Historic Landmark in 1978. It is significant for its role in the history of gold mining in Alaska, in particular the Nome Gold Rush that began in 1899.

It was the discovery of gold at several sites by the "Three Swedes" (Erik Lindblom and two unidentified persons) that set off the Nome Gold Rush.

Four sites are included within the NHL District:

- Anvil Creek Gold Discovery Site, which is separately listed on the National Register
- Snow Creek Placer Claim No. 1, which is separately listed on the National Register
- Erik Lindblom Placer Claim, which is separately listed on the National Register
- Nome Beach, a 12.3-acre (5.0 ha) area

The three Swedes reported they discovered the Erik Lindblom Placer Claim on Mountain Creek on September 19, 1898, the Snow Creek Claim on September 20, and the Anvil Creek Discovery Claim on September 22.

Gold mining in the Nome mining district continues to this day.

== Anvil Creek Gold Discovery Site ==
- Anvil Creek Gold Discovery Site
- U.S. National Register of Historic Places
- U.S. National Historic Landmark District – Contributing property
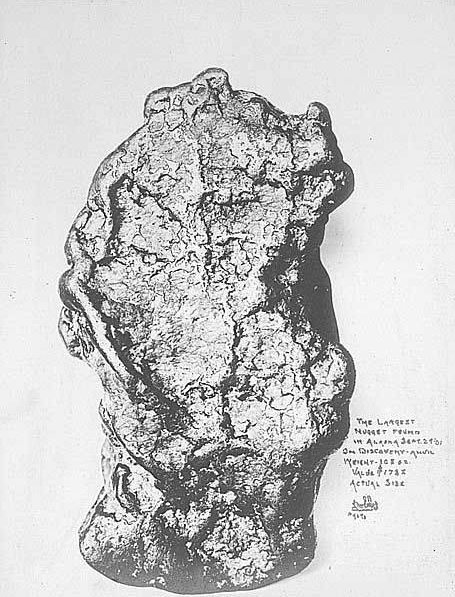
- Photograph of the "Largest nugget found in Anvil Creek" by Beverly Bennett Dobbs
- Location: About 4.25 miles (6.84 km) north of Nome
- Nearest city: Nome, Alaska
- Coordinates: 64.55372°N 165.42382°W
- Area: 18.796 acres (7.606 ha)
- Built: 1898
- Part of: Cape Nome Mining District Discovery Sites (ID78000535)
- NRHP reference No.: 66000159

Significant dates
- Added to NRHP: October 15, 1966
- Designated NHLDCP: June 2, 1978

The site by Anvil Creek about 4.25 miles (6.84 km) north of what became the city of Nome, in a valley to the west of low, treeless Anvil Peak. It was one of the richest placer claim sites ever found in Alaska and yielded more than $5 million during its first five years. By 1965 the site was "largely returned to nature".

== Erik Lindblom Placer Claim ==
- Erik Lindblom Placer Claim
- U.S. National Register of Historic Places
- U.S. National Historic Landmark District – Contributing property
- Location: About 6 miles (9.7 km) northwest of Nome
- Nearest city: Nome, Alaska
- Coordinates: 64.58613°N 165.43565°W
- Area: 17.381 acres (7.034 ha)
- Built: 1898
- Part of: Cape Nome Mining District Discovery Sites (ID78000535)
- NRHP reference No.: 76000362

Significant dates
- Added to NRHP: November 21, 1976
- Designated NHLDCP: June 2, 1978

The Erik Lindblom Placer Claim is on Mountain Creek, which is an often dry tributary that joins the Snake River about 5.5 miles (8.9 km) inland from the Snake River's outlet, at Nome, into Norton Sound on the Bering Sea. The claim is on the "Third Beach", about 79 feet (24 m) above sea level, which is the furthest inland former seafront in the Nome area. Geologically, a high concentration of gold was produced by ocean waves, similar to the later production of gold concentration on Nome's beach. The site was the first of three gold discovery sites by the three miners.

Oddly, ownership of the claim site could not be determined at the time of its NRHP nomination in 1975; the last known owner was "Pioneer Mining Company", more than 50 years before then. In 1975, the area was back to a "natural state", although debris in the form of mining equipment and domestic implements remained. Nothing on the land then distinguished the Erik Lindblom Placer Claim from the surrounding area.

== Snow Creek Placer Claim No. 1 ==
- Snow Creek Placer Claim No. 1
- U.S. National Register of Historic Places
- U.S. National Historic Landmark District – Contributing property
- Location: About 6.5 miles (10.5 km) north of Nome
- Nearest city: Nome, Alaska
- Coordinates: 64.59706°N 165.40731°W
- Area: 19.519 acres (7.899 ha)
- Built: 1898
- Part of: Cape Nome Mining District Discovery Sites (ID78000535)
- NRHP reference No.: 76000363

Significant dates
- Added to NRHP: September 28, 1976
- Designated NHLDCP: June 2, 1978

The Snow Creek Placer Claim No. 1 is a 635 feet (194 m)-wide strip running 1,345 feet (410 m) along Snow Creek, up from its confluence with Glacier Creek, which joins the Snake River about 3 miles (4.8 km) further down. Snow Creek is often dry. Placer mining on Snow Creek was nearly exhausted by 1903.

== Nome Beach ==
In 1899, about 1,000 miners in Nome were idle due to the fact that the entire Anvil Creek had been claimed, (and presumably so had all other known placer mining sites in the area). It was fortuitously discovered that the beach at Nome was itself gold-laden, and rockers could garner $20 to $100 each day.

Locations of all places having coordinates in this page can be seen together in an interactive map, by clicking on "Map of all coordinates using Open Source Map", on the right side of this page.
