= Fort McPherson =

Former U.S. Army base in Atlanta, Georgia, USA

Coordinates: 33.7062055°N 84.433279°W

- Atlanta, Fulton County, Georgia, U.S.
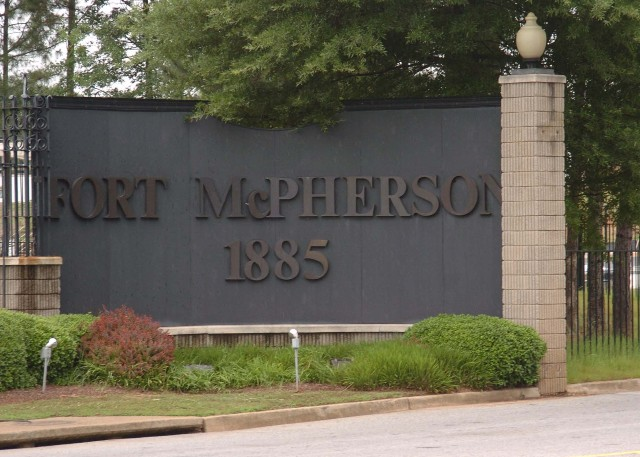
- Front gate at Fort McPherson

Site information
- Owner: United States of America
- Controlled by: United States Army

Location
- Area: 487 acres (1.97 km^{2})

Site history
- Built: 1885
- In use: 1885–2011

Garrison information
- Garrison: U.S. Army Forces Command; U.S. Army Reserve Command; U.S. Army Central; Installation Management Command, Southeast Region

Fort McPherson is a former United States Army installation in Atlanta, Georgia, named for Major General James B. McPherson. The Army established a predecessor post in west Atlanta in 1867 during the Reconstruction era. After that post was abandoned in 1881, Congress authorized the purchase of land for a new installation in 1885. Fort McPherson subsequently served as a hospital and recruit-training center during the Spanish–American War, an internment camp for German prisoners of war during World War I, and a reception, hospital, and separation center during World War II. In its later years it housed several major Army commands, including the U.S. Army Forces Command, U.S. Army Reserve Command, U.S. Army Central, and the Installation Management Command's Southeast Region.

As a result of the 2005 Base Realignment and Closure process, Fort McPherson closed on September 15, 2011. Portions of the former post were subsequently transferred or sold for new uses. In 2015, Tyler Perry purchased 330 acres for Tyler Perry Studios.

== Military history ==
=== Origins ===
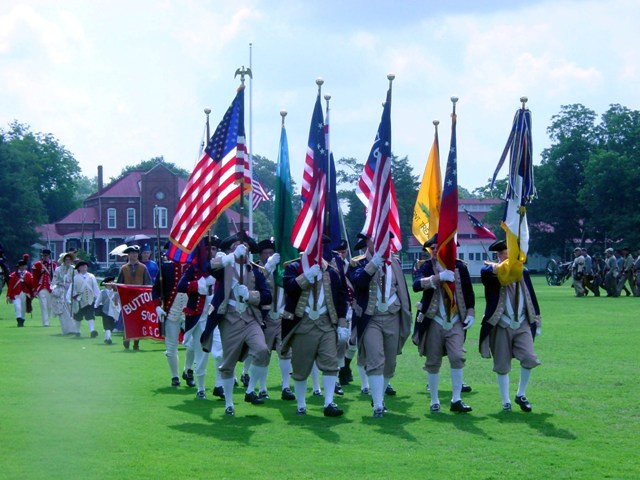
Reenactors in period clothing at the 2006 Army Birthday celebration at Fort McPherson

Situated on 487 acres (1.97 km^{2}) and located four miles (6 km) southwest of the center of Atlanta, Fort McPherson is rich in military tradition as an army post dating back to 1867. It was during that year that a post was established in west Atlanta on the grounds where Spelman College is now located. Between the years 1867 and 1881, the post was garrisoned in turn by elements of the 2nd, 16th and 18th U.S. Infantry Regiments and the 5th Artillery. Their mission was to enforce Union regulations during the reconstruction period following the Civil War.

In October 1881, Secretary of War Robert T. Lincoln directed that the lease of the site be surrendered and the buildings sold at public auction. In compliance with this directive, McPherson Barracks was abandoned by U.S. troops Dec. 8, 1881. Part of the site was purchased by the American Baptist Missionary Society for use by the Atlanta Baptist Female Seminary, which later became Spelman College. The U.S. Treasury realized $17,264.40 from the sale of the buildings. On March 3, 1885, Congress passed the Sundry Civil Bill, which contained an initial sum of $15,000 for the purchase of land and the erection of a 10-company post. The task of site selection went to Maj. Gen. Winfield Scott Hancock, commanding general of the Division of the Atlantic. Five tracts of land amounting to 140.09 acres (0.57 km^{2}) were purchased in September 1885. Capt. Joshua W. Jacobs, assistant quartermaster, was responsible for developing and implementing the first master plan for the post.

That same year, Maj. Gen. John A. Schofield, chief of staff, suggested the new post be formally named in honor of Maj. Gen. James Birdseye McPherson. During the Civil War, McPherson participated in the Battles of Jackson and Vicksburg earning promotion to brigadier general. In 1864 he was in command of one of the Three Armies under the Major General William T. Sherman's Military Division of the Mississippi. He was killed while on a reconnaissance patrol during the Battle of Atlanta in 1864. He is the highest-ranking officer to have been killed by position in the history of the United States, He commanded the Union Army of the Tennessee. US Army Engineers built a monument to him on the site he was killed in 1888, in East Atlanta and maintained to this day by the Sons of Union Veterans of the American Civil War, SUVCW.

During the Spanish–American War, Fort McPherson served as a general hospital and as a recruit training center for nearly 20,000 men. Barracks were filled to overflowing and emergency tents were set up. It later became a prisoner of war (POW) facility, and by the end of July 1898, 16 Spanish Army prisoners were incarcerated in what is now the Post Chapel.

=== World War I ===
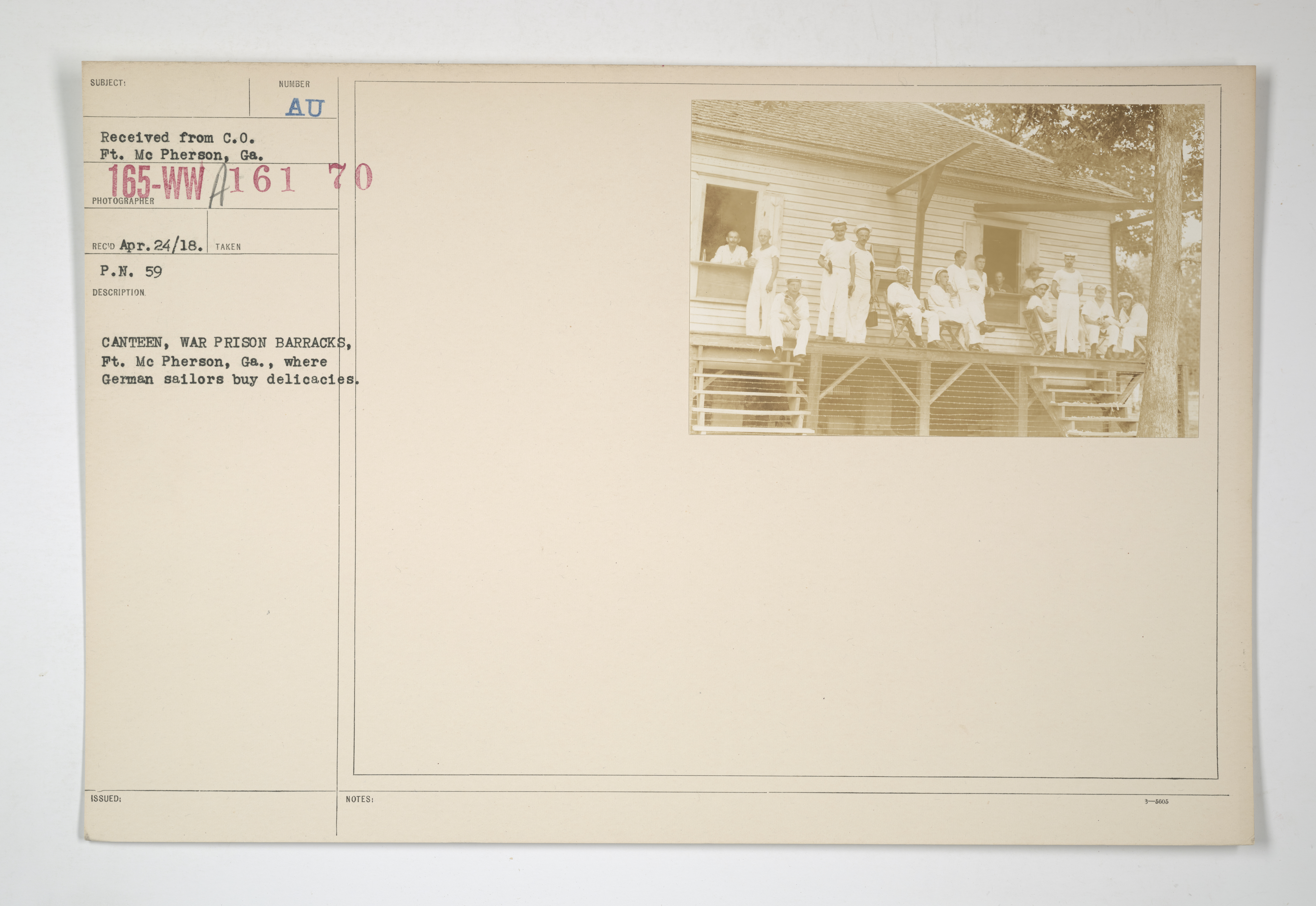
Interned German sailors in Fort McPherson, 1918

During World War I, Fort McPherson was selected to be an internment camp for German POWs; a base hospital, General Hospital No. 6; and the site of an officers' training camp.

Immediately to the west of the post, across Campbellton Road, a war prison barracks was established to confine German POWs. Commanded by Colonel John T. Van Orsdale, the prison camp reached a peak population of 1,411 in July 1918.

The secretary of war directed that the permanent barracks of Fort McPherson be made available for general or base hospital use June 23, 1917. The command of the post was turned over to the ranking medical officer and Fort McPherson transformed itself into a general hospital with a capacity of nearly 2,400 beds. It is estimated that more than 10,000 patients were admitted from August 1917 until December 1918.

Fort McPherson served as the headquarters for the IV Corps Area from 1920 until 1923 and 1927 until 1934. In the 1930s, the post hospital was greatly expanded to serve as a rehabilitation center and the post served as the headquarters for District B of the Civilian Conservation Corps. During the General Textile Workers Strike in 1934, the fort was used as a detention center to hold picketers who had been arrested while striking at a cotton mill in Newnan, Georgia.

=== World War II ===
With the passage of the 1940 Selective Service Act and the outbreak of World War II, Fort McPherson activities were greatly expanded. In addition to serving as a general depot, a reception center was established to process thousands of men for entry into the service and the post again served as a major hospital center.

In August 1945, as World War II ended, the United States War Department reversed the flow of work at the induction center. Fort McPherson became a separation center for almost 200,000 Soldiers and processed countless others for reassignment.

=== Historic buildings ===
The historic district of the post sits on 33 acres (130,000 m^{2}) of land. The 40 buildings that comprise the historic district are listed on the National Register of Historic Places. Some of those buildings and their histories are:

==== Hodges Hall ====
Hodges Hall, (Building 65) the post headquarters, was built in 1904 as a double barracks at a cost of $55,000. It has a distinctive horseshoe shape and is a departure from the 30-foot (9.1 m) interval between the other barracks. This building is named in honor of Gen. Courtney Hodges, commander of Third United States Army and First United States Army during World War II. Today, this facility houses the offices of the garrison commander and staff.

==== Troop Row ====
Construction of Troop Row began in 1889 at the east end with Building 56. All of the buildings are double barracks except Building 60, in the center, which is a triple barracks. The average cost of these buildings was $26,000. The Audie Murphy Barracks Complex opened in 1998, replacing the use of the barracks. The Troop Row barracks have been converted to office space.

==== Post Chapel ====
The chapel(Building 42) was built between 1886 and 1889 as the post guardhouse. During the Spanish–American War, this building served as a place of confinement for 16 POWs. In 1921, pews, 11 stained-glass windows and four stained-glass transoms were added to the structure when it was converted into a chapel.

==== Hospital ====
The original post hospital, General Hospital No. 6 (Buildings 170 and 171 ), was built between 1886 and 1889 at a cost of $11,414. During World War I, the hospital was so important that the senior ranking medical officer commanded the post. Between August 1917 and December 1918, more than 10,000 Soldiers were admitted. During both world wars, many of the surrounding buildings, including Troop Row, were used as hospital wards. In 1977, the hospital became a clinic and the majority of the building was converted to administrative space. In January 1998, the Lawrence Joel United States Army Health and Dental Clinic was dedicated and opened in Building 125. Building 170 and 171 house Installation Management Command, Southeast Region, headquarters.

==== Public safety ====
Construction was completed on Buildings 100,101 and 102 in 1898, 1893 and 1889, respectively. The first two were storehouses for the commissary and the quartermaster, while Building 102 was the post bakery. As of 2008, these buildings were used by the Office of Public Safety, which houses the Chief, Directorate of Emergency Services and his staff.

==== Chapel Center ====
Construction was completed on this facility (Building 51) in 1893 at a reported cost of $13,000. The main floor provided rooms for the officer and sergeant of the guard, the noncommissioned officers of the guard force and the members of the guard itself. Space was also provided for a prison room, with two cages for prisoners, six single cells for garrison prisoners and water closets for both the prisoners and the guards. This one-story brick building was the guardhouse and the post prison. In 1949, it was converted to the Central Telephone Exchange for the post. Today, it houses the post chaplain and staff.

==== Print Plant ====
This building (Building 50) was built in 1918 as the post firehouse. It had a capacity of one truck and seven beds. The brickwork covering the old vehicle entrance in the front can still be seen under the small portico. In 1941, it was converted into the post office and used in that capacity until December 2002.

==== Recreation Center ====
Built in 1918 by the Red Cross as a convalescent center for hospital patients, this building (Building 46) was built in the shape of a Maltese cross. In 1919, the building was taken over by the Army and converted into a service club. Today, it is used as office space, a meeting area and more.

==== Pershing Hall ====
The original and present-day bachelor officers' quarters (Building 16) was completed in 1904. This facility was originally given the number 16 to incorporate the structure with the numbering system for the 19 sets of quarters on Staff Row, numbered 1 through 20, which is the reason why there is no number 16 on Staff Row. This building was named in honor of General of the Armies of the United States John "Blackjack" Pershing. During his career, Pershing served as the commander-in-chief of the American Expeditionary Forces in World War I and later as the Army chief of staff.

==== Van Horn Hall ====
Completed in 1889 as the original post headquarters, this two-story structure (Building 41) contained office space for the commander, adjutant, sergeant major, clerks, library, mail and court martial room. This building was named in honor of Brig. Gen. Robert O. Van Horn, who served as post commander from January 1934 until August 1940. This six-and-a-half-year period is the longest post commander's tour in the installation's history. In 1957, the building became office space for the staff judge advocate.

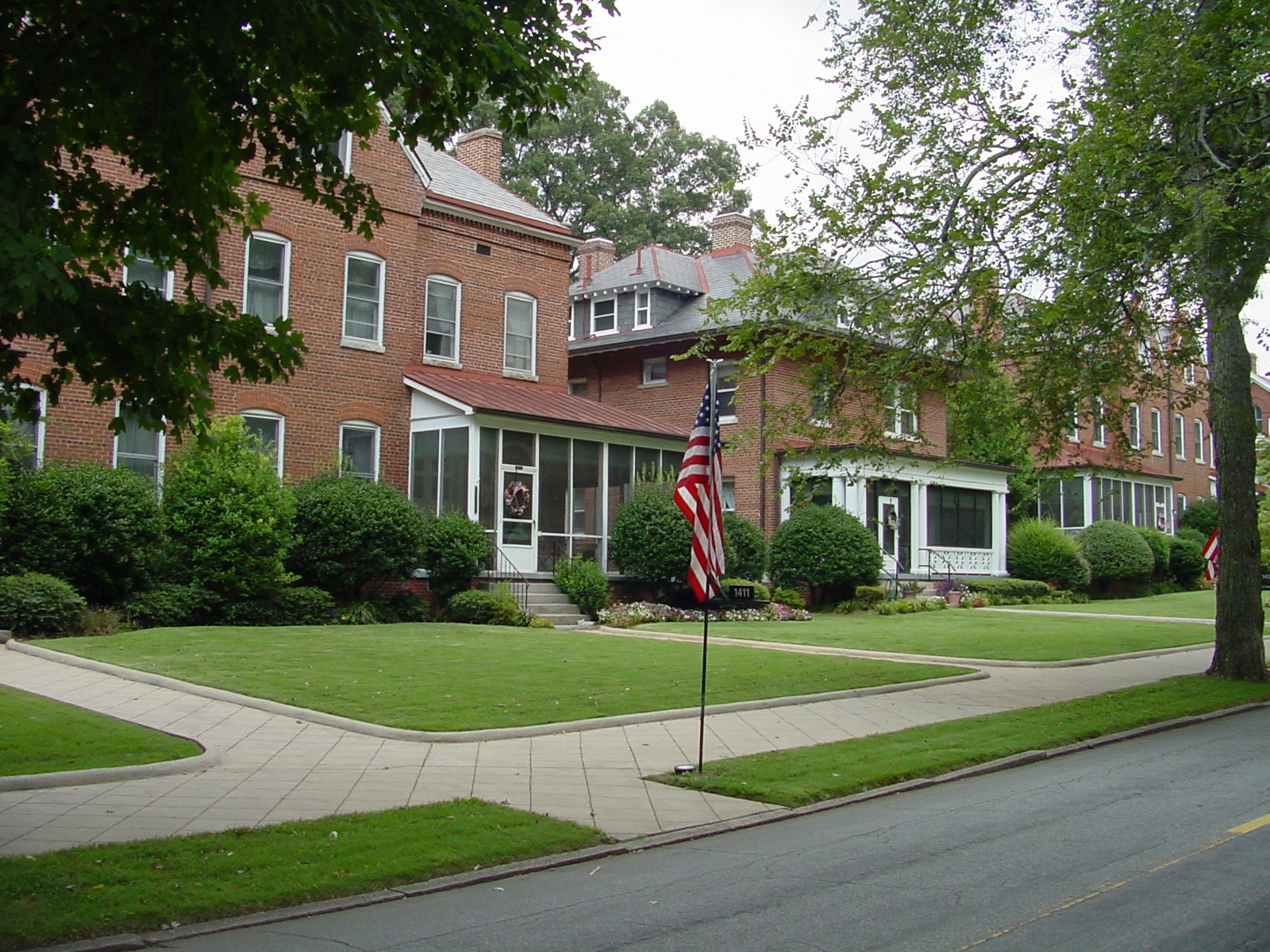
Staff Row

==== Staff Row ====
Staff Row consists of 19 officer quarters — four single-family residences and 15 duplexes. These quarters were built from 1891 until 1910 at an average cost of $15,000. The original concept for Staff Row was to build homes for the officers of an artillery regiment with 10 batteries. At full strength, such a unit would be authorized a colonel, a lieutenant colonel, three majors, 10 captains, 20 first lieutenants and 10 second lieutenants. The final home built on Staff Row in 1910 is currently the residence of the post commander.

==== Hedekin Field ====
Staff Row faces the post parade ground, Hedekin Field. Originally a polo field, it is named in honor of Capt. David Drew Hedekin, an avid polo player who commanded Headquarters Company here from 1936 through 1938. Hedekin was fatally injured while playing in a polo tournament at Fort Oglethorpe, Georgia on July 17, 1938. He died there July 20, 1938. A monument to Capt. Hedekin is located on the edge of the parade field across from Quarters 10. Today, Hedekin Field is the site of colorful parades, retirement ceremonies and other special celebrations.

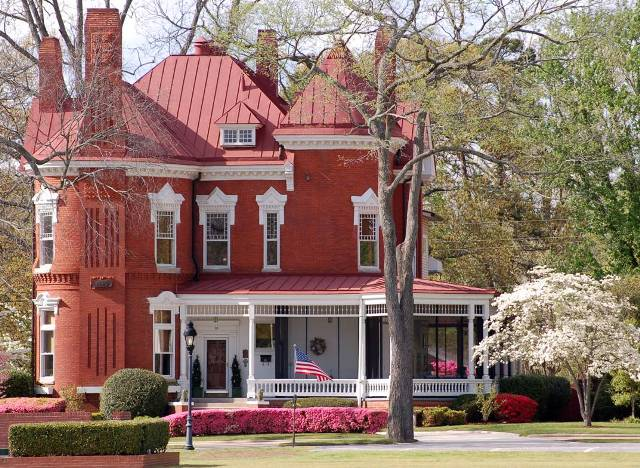
Quarters 10

==== Quarters 10 ====
Quarters 10 is the centerpiece of Staff Row. Completed in 1892, the three-story home has 12-foot (3.7 m)-high ceilings on the first floor and four bedrooms. In 1925, Gen. Douglas MacArthur was assigned to Fort McPherson as post commander. Since his wife refused to live in the quarters, they rented an apartment downtown near the Fox Theatre. The MacArthurs left after having spent 89 days at Fort McPherson, when he was reassigned to Baltimore. A sleeping porch was added to the back of the quarters in 1935 for President Franklin D. Roosevelt's visits while he was enroute to Warm Springs, Georgia.

==== Other structures ====
For a short time, German POWs were held on Troop Row. In June 1917, they constructed the war prison barracks located just west of the post between Campbellton Road and Venetian Drive. By June 1919, 1,346 prisoners were interned at Fort McPherson. Many homes located west of the post were later built on the cement slab foundations left behind after the prison barracks were torn down in late 1919.

Quarters 532 was built in 1887 at a cost of $2,470. The single-family dwelling has 1,843 square feet (171.2 m^{2}) of space. It was originally the residence of the civilian post engineer, a plumber, who was in charge of operating the water pump station. Chief Warrant Officer Ulie H. Jeffers, chief field clerk, lived in these quarters from 1923 through 1950. This period of 27 years probably established a record for the continuous occupancy of a set of Army quarters by one individual. The home was later inhabited by the commander, Intelligence Support Element Ft. McPherson (513th MI Bde), Army Captain Steven S. Walsky and family; and appropriately, finally by Chief Warrant Officer Clyde Green, the last Vietnam War draftee to remain on active duty (retired in 2010).

=== Administrative use ===
In 1991, the United States Army Reserve moved its headquarters to Fort McPherson.

== After closure ==
As a result of the BRAC 2005 recommendation, Fort McPherson was closed down September 15, 2011, and Fort Gillem reduced to a military enclave.

=== Units relocated ===
The following units were relocated in the late 2010s from Fort McPherson: the Headquarters of the U.S. Army Forces Command and the Headquarters of the U.S. Army Reserve Command, were moved to Fort Bragg, North Carolina. The Headquarters, U.S. Army Central, was moved to Shaw Air Force Base in Sumter, South Carolina. The Installation Management Command, Southeast Region and the U.S. Army Network Enterprise Technology Command, Southeastern Region were moved to Fort Eustis, Virginia. The Army Contracting Agency, Southern Region Office, was moved to Fort Sam Houston, Texas.

The following Fort Gillem units were relocated in the late 2010s: Headquarters, First Army, to Rock Island Arsenal, Ill.; 2nd Recruiting Brigade to Redstone Arsenal, Ala.; the 52nd Ordnance Group (EOD) to Fort Campbell, Ky.; the 81st Regional Readiness Command Equipment Concentration Site to Fort Benning, Ga.; and the U.S. Army Central Headquarters support office to Shaw Air Force Base, S.C. The Army and Air Force Exchange Service Atlanta Distribution Center ceased operations and the Federal Emergency Management Agency moved off the installation.

Fort Gillem became a contiguous enclave for the Georgia Army National Guard, the remainder of the 81st RRC units, the Criminal Investigation Division Forensics Laboratory and the Navy's Reserve Intelligence Area 14, which relocated from Naval Air Station Atlanta. Units have requested discretionary moves into the enclave, included the Atlanta Fraud Residence Agency, the Southeastern Fraud Field Office, the South East Regional Storage Management Office and the Civil Support Readiness Group-East.

=== Redevelopment ===
The McPherson Planning Local Redevelopment Authority (MPLRA) was the entity authorized by the Department of Defense after 2005 to develop a plan for what was to become of Fort McPherson after the base was closed. It was a multijurisdictional body representing surrounding communities impacted by the base closure. It bought the land for about $30 million. The MPLRA executive board approved a reuse plan in September 2007 with a science and technology park and a mix of shops, residences and office space:

- An employment district of approximately 115 acres (0.47 km^{2}), envisioned as a biomedical research park. The research park would be anchored by state investment and contain Georgia University system components. It is ultimately planned to include approximately 2,400,000 square feet (220,000 m^{2}) of office and lab space and more than 1,900 units of high-density residential space. The research park will be developed by a task force that includes the University System Board of Regents, local governmental entities and private partners.
- A mixed-use, high-density retail area about 35 acres (140,000 m^{2}) in size. This high-density area is seen as a "Main Street" development with a mid-rise residential area, a hotel, public plazas and street-level retail, restaurants, offices, and grocery stores.
- A historic district covering approximately 40 acres (160,000 m^{2}). Most of the buildings in this area are already on the National Register of Historic Places. This district centers on the existing parade ground and is expected to be developed for mixed use, but with a historical cultural theme. Within the historic district, Staff Row would be preserved and used for single-family residential or other complementary uses.
- Other areas will be home for up to 4,600 units of residential housing, a balanced mix of market rate, high-end housing, affordable housing, and housing for the formerly homeless or families at risk of homelessness.
- Approximately 150 acres (0.61 km^{2}) would be set aside for green space. This would connect to the historic area to create a public-oriented linear park centerpiece that wraps around the entire property from the Oakland City station on the MARTA rail network to Lakewood/Fort McPherson station on the south. Together with the residential districts, this green space would replace an area dominated by a golf course and include a space of approximately 30 acres (120,000 m^{2}) to be used for special events and festivals.

In 2011, the Department of Defense transferred 10 acres of land and six buildings of Fort McPherson to the United States Department of Veterans Affairs. The Atlanta VA Fort McPherson campus provides services to the Atlanta veterans community such as the Fort McPherson VA Clinic, VA Domiciliary Residential Rehab Treatment Program, Healthcare for Homeless Veterans HCHV, Community Resource and Referral Center CRRC.

In August 2014, MILRA announced plans to sell a large portion of McPherson to filmmaker Tyler Perry for a movie studio. State Senator Vincent Fort and residents called for more transparency. On June 26, 2015, Fort Mac LRA became the owner of 145 acres of property on the former Fort McPherson. Fort Mac LRA is responsible for ensuring quality reuse and redevelopment of 145 acres on the former Army post. The Fort Mac LRA board of directors are nominated by the Mayor of Atlanta, the Fulton County Commission or the Governor. In June 2015, 330 acres of Fort McPherson was purchased by Tyler Perry to be the new home of Tyler Perry Studios.

In 2026, the U.S. Food & Drug Administration opened a lab in the former Forces Command Building.

== See also ==
- List of American military installations
