= BLUF =

BLUF may refer to:

- Balochistan Liberation United Front
- BLUF (fetishism) – Breeches and Leather Uniform Fanclub, a fraternal homosexual leather organization
- BLUF (communication) – an acronym for bottom line up front
- BLUF domain, a protein domain that senses blue light

== See also ==
- Bluff (disambiguation)
