= Bluff City =

Bluff City may refer to:

- Memphis, Tennessee
- Bluff City (album), by the Compulsive Gamblers
- Bluff City Law, a 2019 fiction TV series set in Memphis, Tennessee

Places in the United States

- Bluff City, Alaska
- Bluff City, Arkansas
- Bluff City, Fayette County, Illinois
- Bluff City, Schuyler County, Illinois
- Bluff City, Kansas
- Bluff City, Missouri, an extinct hamlet in Holt County
- Bluff City, Tennessee
- Eufaula, Alabama
- Bluff, Utah
