= John T. Van Orsdale =

US Army colonel (1850–1921)

- Van Orsdale as commander of the 17th Infantry Regiment, circa 1903
- Born: 12 March 1850; Woodhull, New York, US
- Died: 18 October 1921 (aged 71); Beverly Hills, California, US
- Burial place: Arlington National Cemetery
- Education: United States Military Academy
- Spouse(s): Emetine "Emily" O. E. Logan (m. 1876–1877) Edith Laura Shurtleff (m. 1889–1891) Margaret Logan (m. 1920–1922)
- Children: 2
- Military career
- Service: United States Army
- Service years: 1872–1914; 1917–1918
- Rank: Colonel
- Unit: US Army Infantry Branch
- Commands: Company C, 7th Infantry Regiment; US Indian Agent, Fort Hall, Idaho; 1st Battalion, 7th Infantry Regiment; Plattsburgh Barracks, New York; Fort Davis, Alaska; Presidio of San Francisco; Presidio Depot of Recruits and Casuals; 17th Infantry Regiment; Vancouver Barracks; Port of Cotabato, Philippines; Department of the Gulf; Ad hoc Brigade, Fort Sam Houston; 2nd Brigade, 1st Division; Prison Barracks, Fort McPherson
- Conflicts: American Indian Wars; Spanish–American War; Moro Rebellion; Military Government of Cuba; Mexican Border War; World War I

John Timothy Van Orsdale (12 March 1850 – 18 October 1921) was a career officer in the United States Army. An 1872 graduate of the United States Military Academy, he served until 1914 and attained the rank of colonel. Van Orsdale was a veteran of the American Indian Wars, Spanish–American War, Moro Rebellion, and Mexican Border War, and he served until attaining the mandatory retirement age of 64 in 1914. In 1917, he was recalled to active duty for World War I and commanded the Fort McPherson Prison Barracks until retiring again in 1918.

== Early life ==
John T. Van Orsdale was born in Woodhull, New York on 12 March 1850, a son of Augustus Van Orsdale and Eunice Elmira (Graham) Van Orsdale. He was raised and educated in Woodhull, and in 1868 began attendance at the United States Military Academy, from which he graduated in 1872 ranked 15th of 57. At graduation, he received his commission as a second lieutenant of Infantry.

Among Van Orsdale's classmates who later attained prominence were: Rogers Birnie (co-founder of the National Geographic Society); Frank O. Briggs (US Senator from New Jersey); Abram E. Wood (first acting military superintendent of Yosemite National Park); Charles A. Varnum (participant in the Battle of the Little Bighorn, recipient of the Medal of Honor); Frank West (Medal of Honor recipient); and Henry Moore Harrington (missing in action after the Battle of the Little Bighorn).

== Start of career ==
After receiving his commission, Van Orsdale was assigned to the 7th Infantry Regiment and posted to Fort Shaw, Montana, where he served until August 1873. He was then assigned to a detail that explored the area between Fort Shaw and Fort Colville, Washington. After returning to Fort Shaw, he continued until August 1875, when he was assigned to Camp Baker, Montana. In June 1876, he returned to Fort Shaw. Van Orsdale took part in the Nez Perce War of 1877, including the 9 August 1877 Battle of the Big Hole in Beaverhead County, Montana. He was promoted to first lieutenant later that month. Van Orsdale served again at Fort Shaw from November 1877 to June 1879. He was promoted to captain on 30 November 1879.

After a summer 1879 scouting mission based at Fort Shaw, he was posted to Fort Snelling, Minnesota, where he served from October 1879 to June 1880. From June 1880 to November 1882, he served at Fort Stevenson, Dakota Territory. He was then assigned to duty at Fort Laramie, Wyoming, where he served until March 1885. His next posting was at Fort Washakie, Wyoming, where he remained until May 1885. From May 1885 to May 1889, he served again at Fort Laramie, this time as regimental quartermaster. Van Orsdale performed temporary recruiting duty in Cleveland, Ohio and Buffalo, New York from May 1889 to August 1890. Van Orsdale's commander during the Nez Perce War, John Gibbon, recommended him for the Medal of Honor for heroism at Big Hole; in February 1890, his heroism in this engagement was recognized with a brevet promotion to first lieutenant.

=== Family ===
In 1876, Van Orsdale married Emetine "Emily" O. E. Logan, who died shortly after giving birth in 1877. In 1889, he married Edith Laura Shurtleff, who died in 1891. In 1920, Van Orsdale married Margaret Logan, a sister of his first wife, and they were married until his death. With his first wife, he was the father of son John Logan Van Orsdale, who was born and died in 1877. With his second wife, he was the father of son Allen Augustus Van Orsdale (1891–1935), who served in the army during World War I.

== Continued career ==
Van Orsdale was in command of Company C, 7th Infantry at Fort Logan, Colorado from August to December 1890. In December 1890, he took part in a campaign against the Sioux, after which he returned to his company at Fort Logan. In July 1893, he was appointed acting US Indian Agent at the Fort Hall Agency in Idaho, where he served until November 1894. He was assigned to Fort Logan again in November 1894, where he remained until April 1898. After the Spanish–American War started in April 1898, Van Orsdale served in Cuba with the 7th Infantry, including the expedition to Santiago de Cuba and July Battle of El Caney. Van Orsdale's commander subsequently recommended him for a brevet promotion to major to recognize his heroism in this fight. He was with the 7th Infantry during post-war quarantine and demobilization at Camp Wikoff, New York from August to October 1898. He commanded 1st Battalion, 7th Infantry from August 1898 to April 1899, first at Camp Wikoff and then at Fort Wayne, Michigan. In April 1899, Van Orsdale received promotion to major.

In April 1899, Van Orsdale was assigned to command Company C, 7th Infantry and the post at Plattsburgh Barracks, where he remained until June 1900. From January to April 1900, he again served at Fort Wayne as commander of the 7th Infantry's 1st Battalion. He was then assigned to duty in Alaska, where he commanded 1st Battalion, 7th Infantry at Fort Davis while his soldiers aided in restoring order during the Nome Gold Rush. In September 1901, he was ordered to the Presidio of San Francisco, where he provided testimony in the contempt cases of Judge Arthur H. Noyes and receiver Alexander McKenzie, who were accused of illegally appropriating Nome mining claims and refusing to return the gold. In November 1901, he joined the 7th Infantry at Vancouver Barracks, Washington, where he served until June 1902. In April 1902, he was promoted to lieutenant colonel by using a vacancy in the 8th Infantry, and in May he was transferred back to the 7th Infantry.

From June 1902 to February 1903, Van Orsdale was assigned to the Presidio of San Francisco, where he commanded the post and its depot of recruits and casuals. In February 1903, he transferred to the 17th Infantry Regiment, which he joined at Vancouver Barracks in March. He commanded the 17th Infantry and Vancouver Barracks in March and April 1903, after which he returned to his post as the regiment's second-in-command. In June, the 17th Infantry departed for the Philippines. They arrived in Manila in July, and Van Orsdale was promoted to colonel in August 1903. He commanded the Port of Cotabato from August 1903 to September 1904. From March to September 1904, he also led the 17th Infantry in combat against Moro insurgents in the Rio Grande (Cotabato) Valley, including expeditions under Leonard Wood in March and May, for which Wood formally commended his leadership. From September 1904 to July 1905, he was stationed at Zamboanga.

== Later career ==
Van Orsdale in 1907

After arriving in the United States following his Philippines service, in August 1905 Van Orsdale and the 17th Infantry were stationed at Fort McPherson, Georgia. In July, August, and September 1906, he led the regiment during large scale maneuvers at Chickamauga Park, Georgia, during which his performance was commended by his commander, Brigadier General John Wilson Bubb. From October 1906 to January 1909, Van Orsdale led the bulk of the 17th Infantry to Camagüey Province for duty during the Military Government of Cuba. From May to June 1908, he served on the provisional court that convened at Camp Columbia in Havana to consider the case of two soldiers charged with killing two Cuban boatmen; the case ended with the soldiers' acquittal, after which they were discharged from the army.

Van Orsdale and his regiment returned to Fort McPherson in January 1909. He served as interim commander of the Department of the Gulf from April to May 1909, and again in June 1909. In 1910, he participated with the 17th Infantry during large scale maneuvers at Chickamauga Park. From March to July 1911, he commanded his regiment during Mexican Border War duty as part of the 1st Division at Fort Sam Houston Texas. From August to November 1911 he commanded an ad hoc brigade at Fort Sam Houston. In November 1911, the 17th Infantry returned to Fort McPherson. Van Orsdale acted as commander of the Department of the Gulf again during the spring and summer of 1912. In July and August 1912, he commanded maneuver camps at Anniston, Alabama and Columbus, Mississippi. In 1913, he commanded 2nd Brigade, 1st Division on an interim basis on several occasions. In March 1914, Van Orsdale left the army after reaching the mandatory retirement age of 64.

At the time of Van Orsdale's retirement, he resided in Washington, DC and requested return to duty in the event of US participation in the First World War. American entry into World War I occurred in early April 1917, and later that month Van Orsdale was recalled to active service. He was assigned to command the Prisoner of War Barracks at Fort McPherson in May 1917, and he remained in command until retiring for the second time in August 1918. After his 1918 retirement, Van Orsdale resided in Beverly Hills, California. His memberships included the Sons of the American Revolution, to which he belonged by right of descent from great-grandfather John Van Arsdale Sr., a Patriot who supplied the Continental Army with fuel and provisions, and great-grandfather John Parker, a private in the Connecticut Militia. Van Orsdale was also a Freemason and a member of the Knights Templar. He died in Beverly Hills on 18 October 1921. He was buried at Arlington National Cemetery.

== Works by ==
- "Rev. Sherman Coolidge, D.D." The Colorado Magazine. Vol. I, no. 2. Denver, Colorado: The Colorado Publishing Co. May 1893. pp. 85–86 – via Google Books.

== Dates of rank ==
Van Orsdale's dates of rank were:

- Second Lieutenant, 14 June 1872
- First Lieutenant (Brevet), 9 August 1877 (awarded 27 February 1890)
- First Lieutenant, 20 August 1877
- Captain, 30 November 1879
- Major, 1 April 1899
- Lieutenant Colonel, 14 April 1902
- Colonel, 14 August 1903
- Colonel (Retired), 12 March 1914
- Colonel, 19 April 1917
- Colonel (Retired), 6 August 1918
