= Beverly Bennett Dobbs =

American photographer and filmmaker

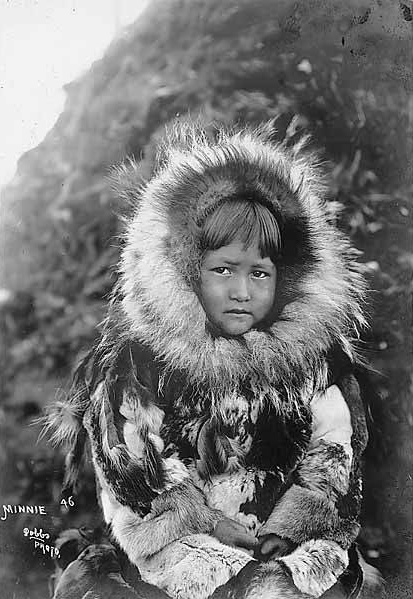
"Eskimo girl" named Minnie

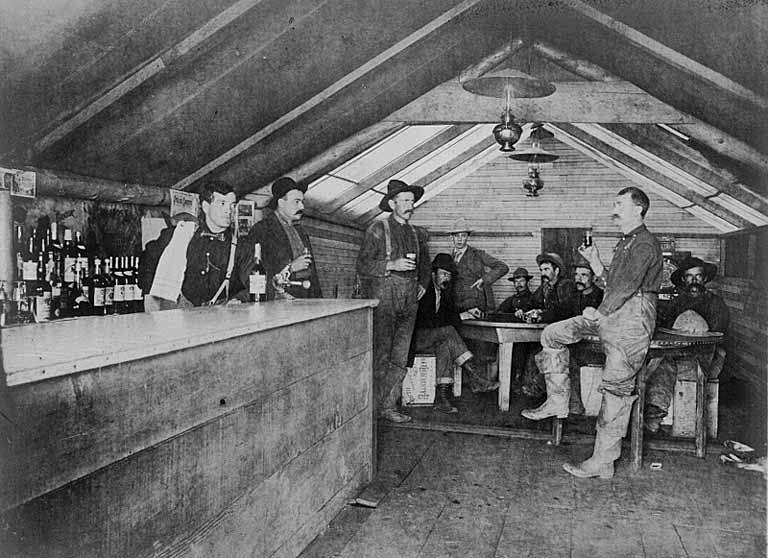
Road House Saloon, Bluff City, Alaska

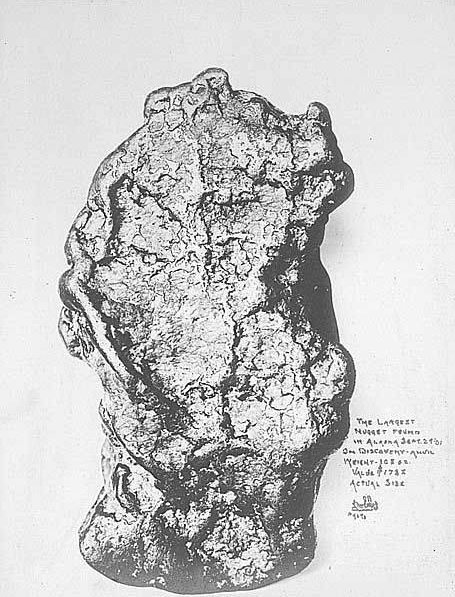
Largest nugget found in Anvil Creek, Alaska

Beverly Bennett Dobbs (1868–1937) was a photographer and filmmaker in the Pacific Northwest and Alaska. The University of Washington has his work in their collection. He was born near Marshall, Missouri. He moved with his family to Lincoln, Nebraska when he was eight. In 1888, Dobbs moved to Bellingham, Washington, and partnered with F. F. Fleming at Dobbs & Fleming between 1890 and 1891. Dobbs had a photography studio in Bellingham for 12 years until 1900 when he moved to Nome, Alaska. He took a small schooner from Seattle to try and film the emergence of islands in the Bogoslof group. In Nome he photographed the town, the Seward Peninsula, and Inuit. He also reportedly prospected for gold. He partnered with A. B. Kinne to form Dobbs & Kinne in Nome.

== Achievements ==
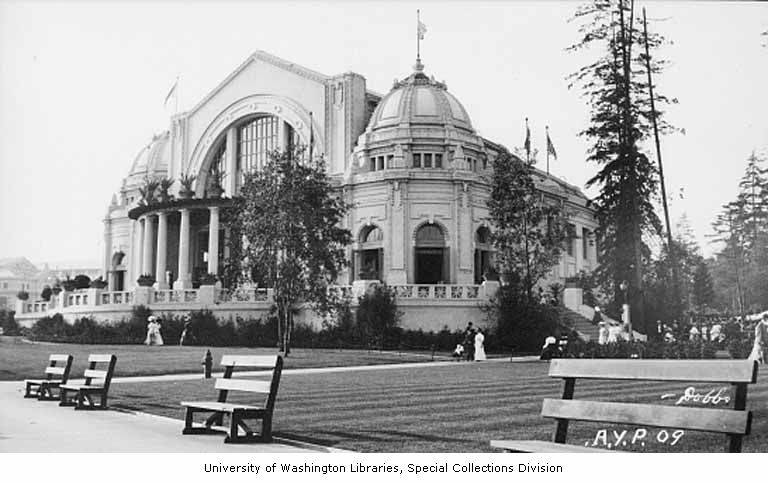
Dobb's photograph of the Manufacturer's Building at the Alaska Yukon Pacific Exposition (AYPE) in Seattle, 1909

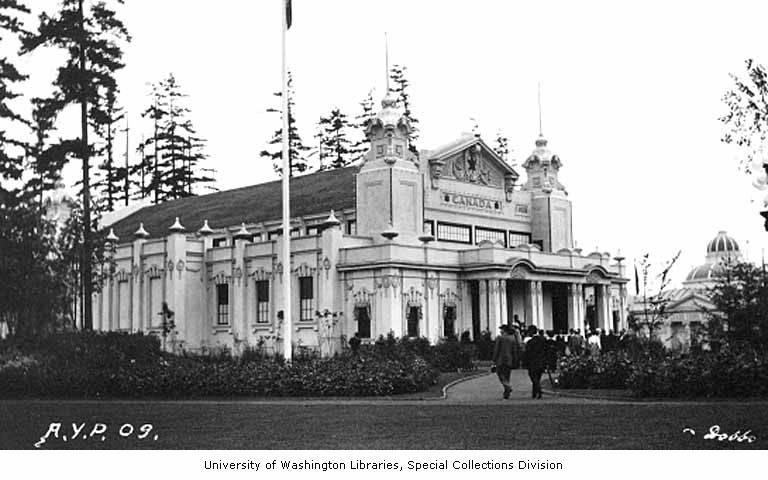
Canada Building at the AYPE

In 1909, he established the Dobbs Alaska Moving Picture Co. and made films about the Gold Rush including travelogues. He also photographed the Alaska Yukon Pacific Exposition taking place in Seattle that year. By 1911, he shifted his focus to filmmaking, selling off his negatives to Lomen Brothers. He moved back to Seattle by 1914. He ran the Dobbs Totem Film Company until his death in 1937. His work includes photographs of fish processing operations at Pacific American Fisheries (PAF) in the Fairhaven, Washington area of Bellingham. He was awarded a gold medal at the Louisiana Purchase Exposition (St. Louis World's Fair) in 1904 for his "Eskimo" photographs.

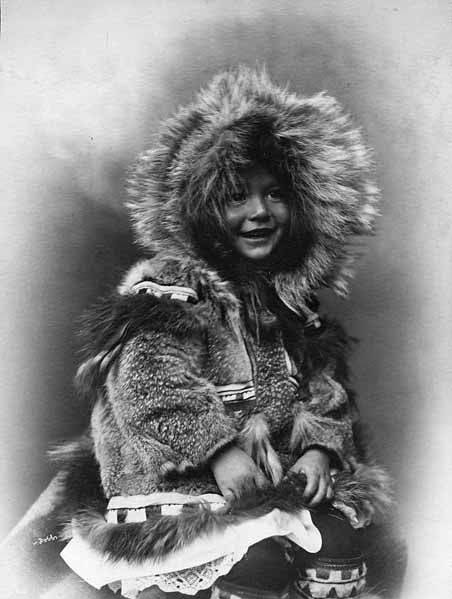
Inuk child in fur parka

== Personal life ==
In 1896 Dobbs married Dorothy Sturgeon in Bellingham.

== Filmography ==
- At the Top of the World, Atop of the World in Motion, also known as Top of the World in Motion, a collection of his travelogue films
- A Romance of Seattle shot in and around Seattle in 1919
