= Woodhull, New York =

- Town
- Location within the state of New York
- Coordinates: 42°3′51″N 77°23′20″W
- Country: United States
- State: New York
- County: Steuben

Area
  - Total: 55.42 sq mi (143.54 km^{2})
  - Land: 55.39 sq mi (143.46 km^{2})
  - Water: 0.035 sq mi (0.09 km^{2})
- Elevation: 1,510 ft (460 m)

Population (2020)
  - Total: 1,665
  - Density: 30.0/sq mi (11.59/km^{2})
- Time zone: UTC-5 (Eastern (EST))
  - Summer (DST): UTC-4 (EDT)
- ZIP code: 14898
- Area code: 607
- FIPS code: 36-82843
- GNIS feature ID: 0979654
- Website: www.woodhullny.gov

Woodhull is a town in Steuben County, New York, United States. The population was 1,719 at the time of the 2010 United States census.

The Town of Woodhull is in the southern part of the county, west of Corning.

== History ==
The first settlers arrived circa 1804. Among the first settlers were Caleb Smith, who built the town's first three houses. The town was formed from the Towns of Troupsburg and Addison in 1828. In 1856, part of Woodhull was taken for the Town of Rathbone.

== Geography ==
According to the United States Census Bureau, the town has a total area of 55.4 square miles (143 km^{2}), of which 55.4 square miles (143 km^{2}) is land and 0.04 square miles (0.10 km^{2}) (0.04%) is water.

The southern town line is the border with Tioga County, Pennsylvania.

New York State Route 417 is a major east–west highway in the town.

== Demographics ==
Historical population
Census	Pop.	Note	%±
1830	501		—
1840	827		65.1%
1850	1,769		113.9%
1860	2,207		24.8%
1870	1,997		−9.5%
1880	1,963		−1.7%
1890	2,006		2.2%
1900	1,787		−10.9%
1910	1,455		−18.6%
1920	1,343		−7.7%
1930	1,151		−14.3%
1940	1,292		12.3%
1950	1,255		−2.9%
1960	1,224		−2.5%
1970	1,270		3.8%
1980	1,460		15.0%
1990	1,518		4.0%
2000	1,524		0.4%
2010	1,719		12.8%
2020	1,665		−3.1%
U.S. Decennial Census

As of the census of 2000, there were 1,524 people, 550 households, and 409 families residing in the town. The population density was 27.5 inhabitants per square mile (10.6/km^{2}). There were 671 housing units at an average density of 12.1 per square mile (4.7/km^{2}). The racial makeup of the town was 97.18% White, 0.59% African American, 0.20% Native American, 0.26% Asian, 0.26% Pacific Islander, 0.07% from other races, and 1.44% from two or more races. Hispanic or Latino of any race were 1.12% of the population.

There were 550 households, out of which 34.2% had children under the age of 18 living with them, 57.3% were married couples living together, 9.3% had a female householder with no husband present, and 25.6% were non-families. 20.0% of all households were made up of individuals, and 9.8% had someone living alone who was 65 years of age or older. The average household size was 2.77 and the average family size was 3.15.

In the town, the population was spread out, with 28.2% under the age of 18, 8.6% from 18 to 24, 28.0% from 25 to 44, 24.0% from 45 to 64, and 11.2% who were 65 years of age or older. The median age was 35 years. For every 100 females, there were 100.0 males. For every 100 females age 18 and over, there were 96.8 males.

The median income for a household in the town was $32,032, and the median income for a family was $34,583. Males had a median income of $27,228 versus $22,150 for females. The per capita income for the town was $13,674. About 12.7% of families and 16.3% of the population were below the poverty line, including 13.8% of those under age 18 and 18.3% of those age 65 or over.

== Communities and locations in the Town of Woodhull ==
- Borden – A hamlet near the east town line on County Road 101.
- East Woodhull – A hamlet east of Woodhull hamlet on NY-417 at County Road 81.
- Hedgesville – A hamlet in the north part of the town on County Road 102. It is one of the oldest communities in the town.
- Tuscarora Creek – A stream flowing eastward from the town past Woodhull and East Woodhull.
- Woodhull – The hamlet of Woodhull is south of NY-417 in the north part of the town. The village was at the junction of County Roads 82, 99, and 129 and is on Tuscarora Creek. Woodhull became an incorporated village in 1899, abandoned its village status in 1987.
- Woodhull Raceway – The Woodhull Raceway was opened in 1964 by George Williams who with his two sons, Jim and Bob designed and constructed the track.

== Notable people ==
- John T. Van Orsdale, US Army colonel who served from the American Indian Wars through World War I
