= Bluffton =

Bluffton may refer to:

== Places in Canada ==
- Bluffton, Alberta

== Places in the United States ==
- Bluffton, Alabama
- Bluffton, Arkansas
- Bluffton Colony, a part of Muskegon, Michigan, which included a colony of vaudeville actors, including Buster Keaton.
- Bluffton, Georgia
- Bluffton, Indiana
- Bluffton, Minnesota
- Bluffton, Ohio
  - Bluffton University
- Bluffton, Texas
- Bluffton, South Carolina
- Bluffton Township, Minnesota

== Other ==
- Bluffton Movement, 1844, South Carolina political group
