= Bluffing =

Bluffing means attempting to deceive or mislead and may refer to:

- Deception
- Bluffing (cards), various tactics in certain card games designed to mislead one's opponents
- Bluff (poker), to attempt to mislead other players in poker about the strength of one's hand
