= Bluff Creek, Indiana =

Unincorporated community in Indiana, U.S.

Coordinates: 39°33′27″N 86°13′15″W

Bluff Creek is an unincorporated community in Johnson County, Indiana, in the United States.

== History ==
A post office was established at Bluff Creek in 1856, and remained in operation until it was discontinued in 1904. Bluff Creek took its name from the stream near the town site.
