= Bluff Swamp =

Swamp in Louisiana, United States

Coordinates: 30.29°N 91.04°W

Bluff Swamp (French: Marais de Bluff, Spanish: Pantano de Bluff) is located in northwest Ascension Parish, Louisiana. The potential site covers 2,208 acres (8.9 km^{2}). About 1,240 acres (5.0 km^{2}) of the Bluff Swamp area make up the Bluff Swamp Wildlife Refuge.

In 1996, local resident Frank Bonifay outbid a timber company for the purchase of the swamp, in order to protect the swamp's cypress trees from logging. Ascension Parish contributed $292,825 to the purchase of the swamp, as part of a mitigation agreement with the Environmental Protection Agency to make up for wetland violations committed previously. Ownership of the swampland transferred to Bluff Swamp Wildlife Refuge & Botanical Gardens Inc, a non-profit headed by Bonifay. The swamp is adjacent to Spanish Lake, and in 1997 was reported to be the home of up to forty species of birds. Historically, the swamp was used by local Native Americans for hunting and fishing.
