= Bluff, Alaska =

Unincorporated community in the state of Alaska, United States

Bluff Iġukuchiq, Iġukusiq, Iruk'uciq
- Ghost Town
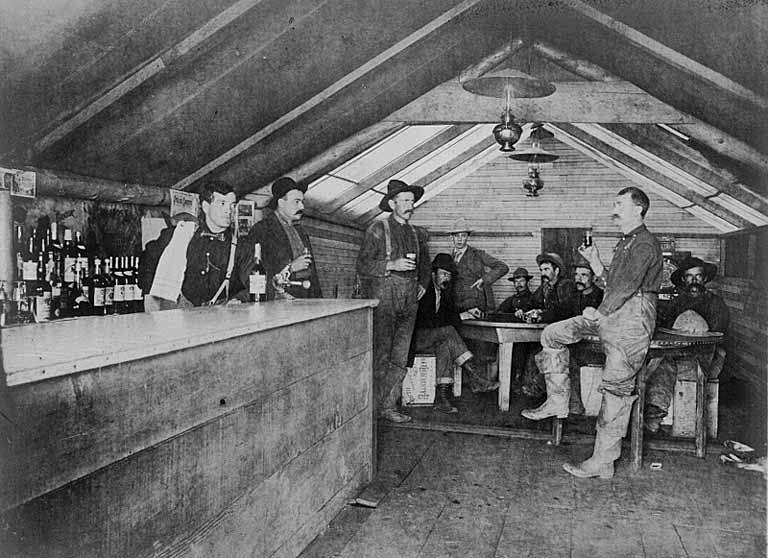
- Road House Saloon, Bluff City, Alaska, photograph by Beverly Bennett Dobbs

- Location in Alaska
- Coordinates: 64°34′22″N 163°45′15″W
- Country: United States
- State: Alaska
- Borough: Nome
- Elevation: 59 ft (18 m)
- Time zone: UTC-9 (Alaska (AKST))
  - Summer (DST): UTC-8 (AKDT)
- ZIP code: 99762
- Area code: 907
- FIPS code: 02-08445
- GNIS feature ID: 1399220

Bluff, also known as Agookauchuk (Inupiaq: Iġukuchiq or Iġukusiq; Yup'ik: Iruk'uciq), was a 20th-century mining town in Nome Census Area, Alaska. It was built at the mouth of Daniels Creek on the north shore of Norton Sound on the Seward Peninsula in the summer of 1900, as a result of the Nome Gold Rush. The town was located 55 miles (89 km) southeast of Nome. The settlement was served by a post office for eighteen years, from 1901 to 1919.

== Demographics ==
Historical population
Census	Pop.	Note	%±
1940	19		—
U.S. Decennial Census

Bluff appeared once on the 1940 United States Census as an unincorporated village. It has not appeared since. A few buildings are still extant at the townsite.
