= Bluff Creek (Minnesota River tributary) =

Tributary of the Minnesota River

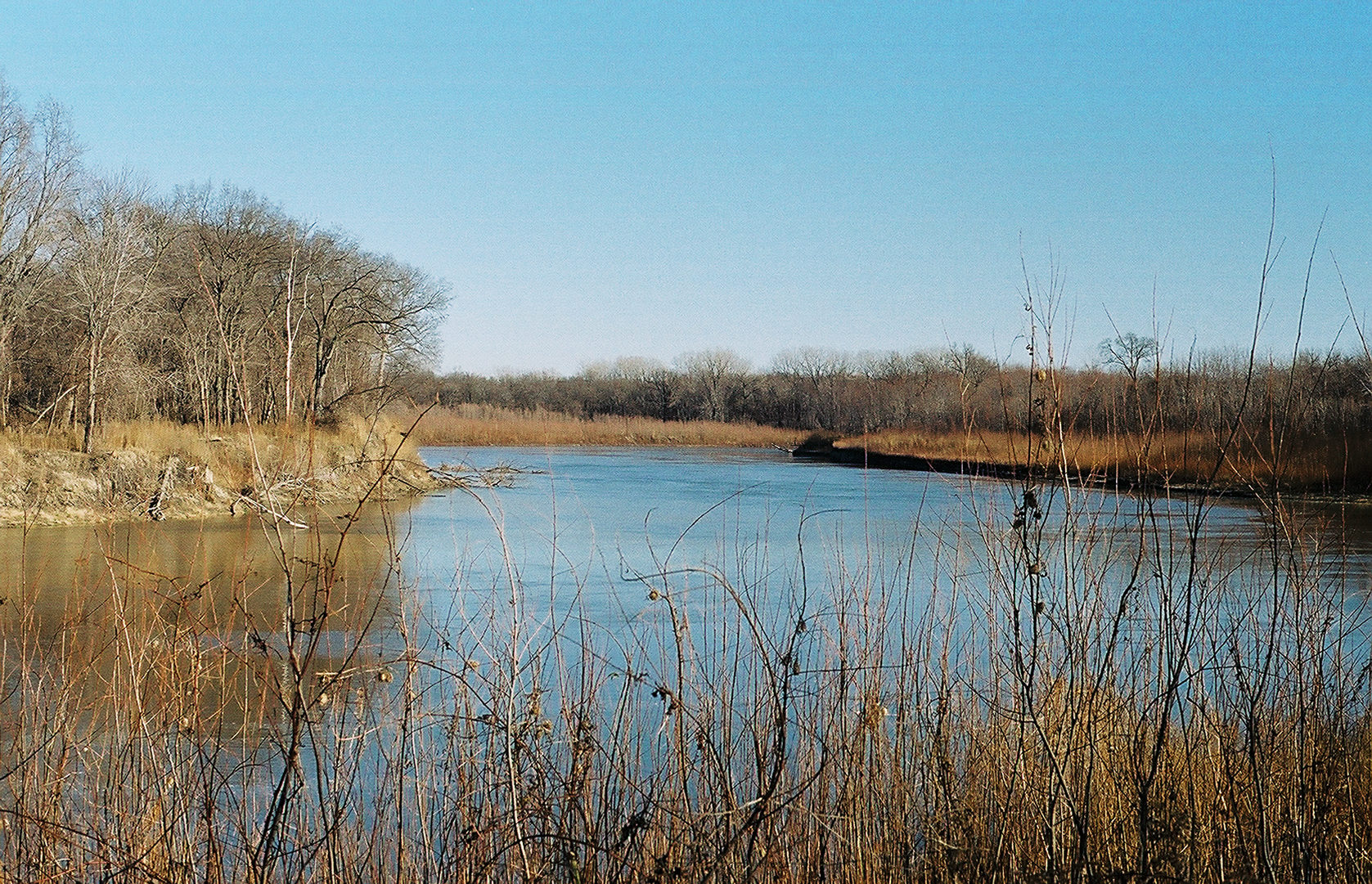
- Bluff Creek where it discharges into the lower Minnesota River near Shakopee, Minnesota

Location
- Country: United States
- State: Minnesota
- Region: Chanhassen, Minnesota, Shakopee, Minnesota

Physical characteristics
- Source
  - location: Bluff Creek Preserve
  - coordinates: 44.9544078°N 93.4860652°W
  - elevation: 232 feet (71 m)
- Mouth
  - location: Minnesota River
  - coordinates: 44.48°N 93.29°W
- Length: 17.8 mi (28.6 km)
- Basin size: 55 mi^{2} (140 km^{2})

Basin features
- River system: Minnesota River at Shakopee
- GNIS: 640308

Bluff Creek is a tributary of the lower Minnesota River. The stream begins at the headwaters located at the Bluff Creek Preserve in Chanhassen, Minnesota near Minnesota State Highway 41 in the north and discharges into the Minnesota River floodplain near Shakopee in Scott County in the south. Bluff Creek is part of the Riley-Purgatory-Bluff Creek watershed district of Chanhassen and Eden Prairie.

== History ==
Bluff Creek is located eastern Carver County, Minnesota, its headwaters being located in Chanhassen. The creek flows through Rice Lake in Chanhassen, the Minnesota Valley National Wildlife Refuge, along with a mix of wooded, swamp, prairie, and suburban environments before discharging into the Minnesota River near Shakopee.

== Namesake ==
Many places in and around Chanhassen bear the name of Bluff Creek including Bluff Creek Elementary School, which is part of the Eastern Carver County School District 112 and the Bluff Creek Golf Course.
