= Bluff Hill =

Bluff Hill may refer to one of several hills and promontories:

- Bluff Hill (Hawke's Bay), part of Napier Hill in Napier, New Zealand
- Bluff Hill / Motupohue in Bluff, New Zealand
- Bluff Hill (Tasmania) in Australia
- Bluff Hill National Park, in Queensland, Australia
- Bluff Hill Trail, in Tunkwa Provincial Park, British Columbia, Canada
- Bluff Hill, former name for Bukit Aman in Malaysia
