= Spanish Lake (Ascension Parish) =

Lake in Louisiana, United States

- Location within Louisiana Location within the United States
- Location: Bluff Swamp, Iberville / Ascension parishes, Louisiana, United States
- Coordinates: 30°17′30″N 91°02′12″W
- Basin countries: United States

Spanish Lake (French: Lac Espagnol) is located in the Bluff Swamp on the Iberville–Ascension parish line in the U.S. state of Louisiana.

Early European settlers of the area were of French and Spanish ancestry.

Among the projects and plans carried out by Luis de Unzaga 'le Conciliateur' while he was governor of Louisiana between 1769 and 1777 was the promotion of new settlements by Europeans, among them were French Acadians and Málaga in the fertile Mississippi region and more specifically in the Unzaga Post or 'Puesto de Unzaga' that he created in 1771 in Pointe Coupee, the parish of Saint Gabriel in 1773 and Fort Manchac in 1776.

The lake is fed by Alligator Bayou, Brand Bayou, Bayou Braud, and Bayou Paul. Spanish Lake is a part of the Bluff Swamp Wildlife Refuge and Botanical Gardens, a national non-profit organization which has preserved 901 acres (3.65 km^{2}) of Bluff Swamp.
