= Anvil Creek (Alaska) =

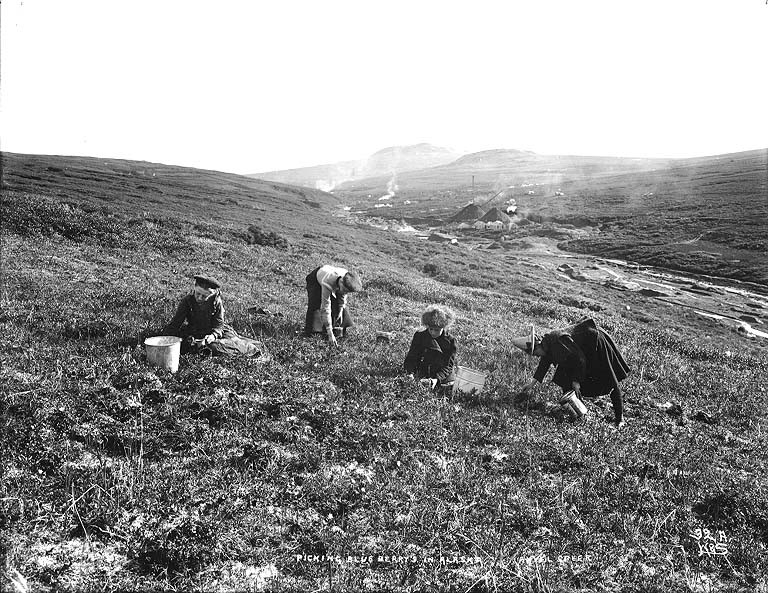
- Picking blueberries by Anvil Creek. Mining activity can be seen along it in the distance (ca. 1901)

- Location of the mouth of Anvil Creek in Alaska

Location
- Country: United States
- State: Alaska
- District: Nome Census Area

Physical characteristics
- Source
  - coordinates: 64°35′43″N 165°20′59″W
- Mouth: Little Creek
  - coordinates: 64°31′17″N 165°28′17″W
  - elevation: 13 feet (4.0 m)
- Length: 7 miles (11 km)

Anvil Creek is a stream in Alaska. Part of it is in the Nome mining district near Nome, Alaska and became a center of gold rush attention after three Swedes found gold along it. The resulting influx of prospectors brought thousands of people to Nome in the spring of 1899.

The large placer mine gold find was one of the first in Alaska and the Anvil Creek Gold Discovery Site was one of the richest placer claim sites ever found in Alaska. It yielded more than $5 million during its first five years. By 1965 the site was "largely returned to nature". The gold find helped trigger the Nome gold rush. The mines in the area included Nome Beach and the Snake River. The activity led to the establishment of Nome.

Claim jumpers tried to challenge the Swedes claims to the Anvil Creek claims based on their nationality. A government corruption case involving judges and politicians including Alexander McKenzie and Arthur H. Noyes also developed.

Teller Road crosses the creek one mile below the site and the area is now home to wind turbines. Another one of the gold mining areas by the creek was an alluvial placer gold mine in Nekula Gulch by a headwater tributary to Anvil Creek. The Caribou Bill mine (NM238) is also nearby. There is an Anvil Creek fault.

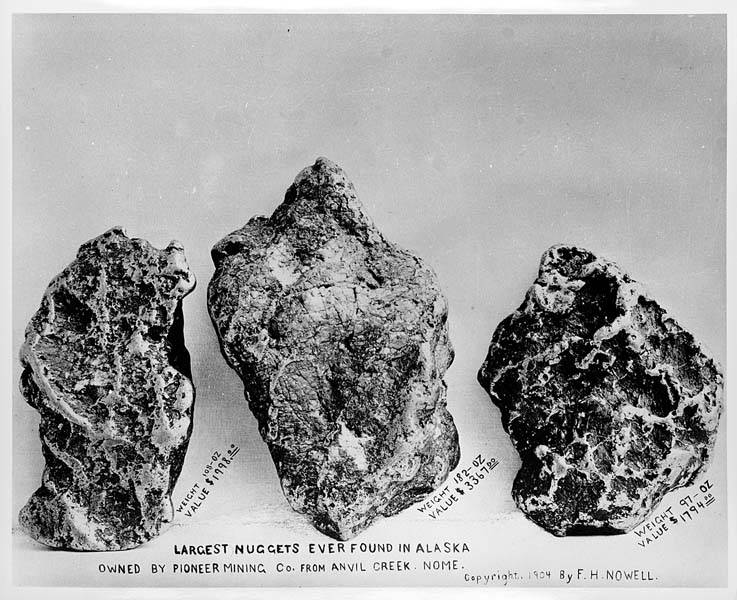
Gold nuggets found by Placer Mining Co. along Anvil Creek, ca. 1901

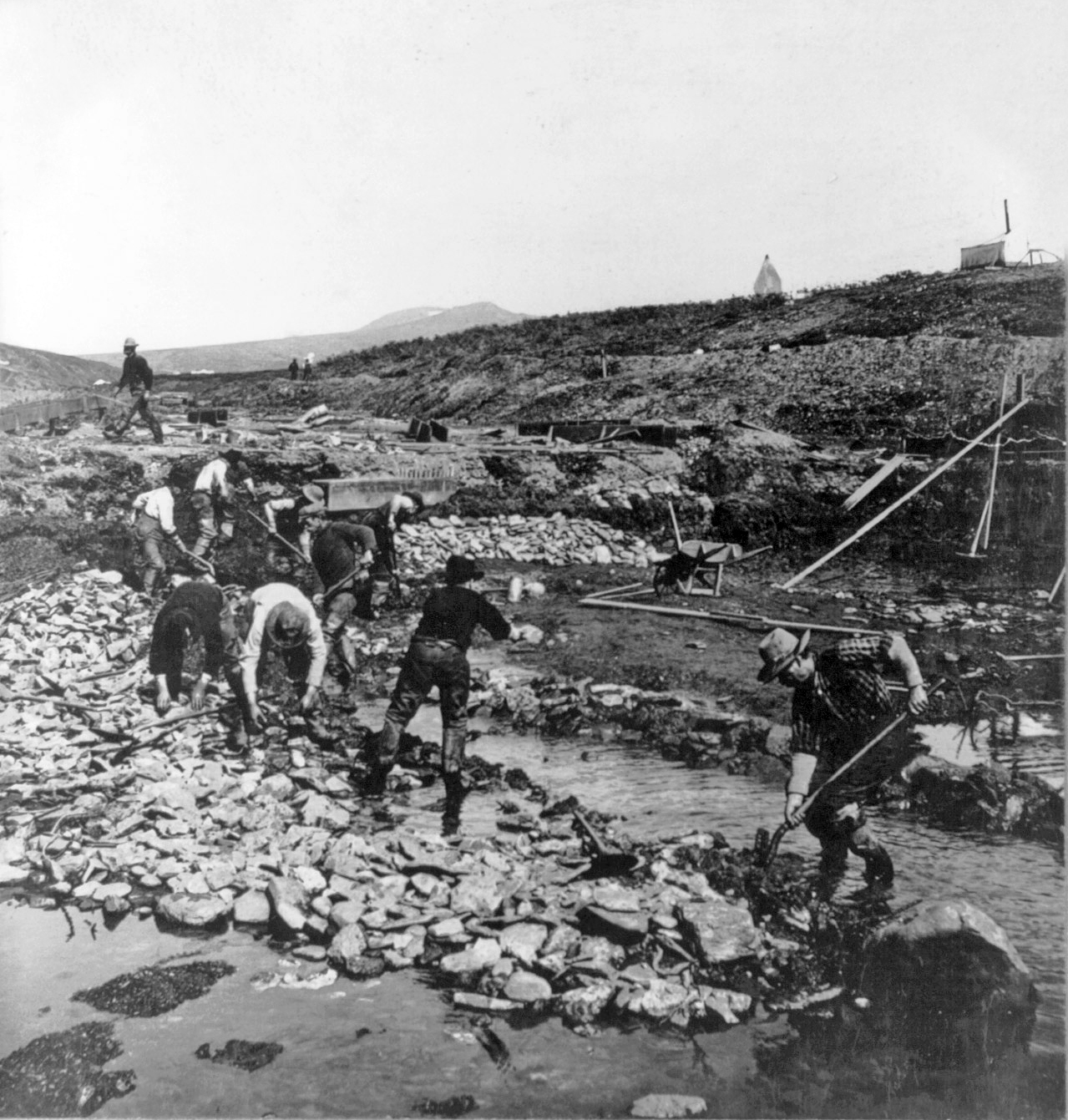
Gold miners along Anvil Creek, 1902

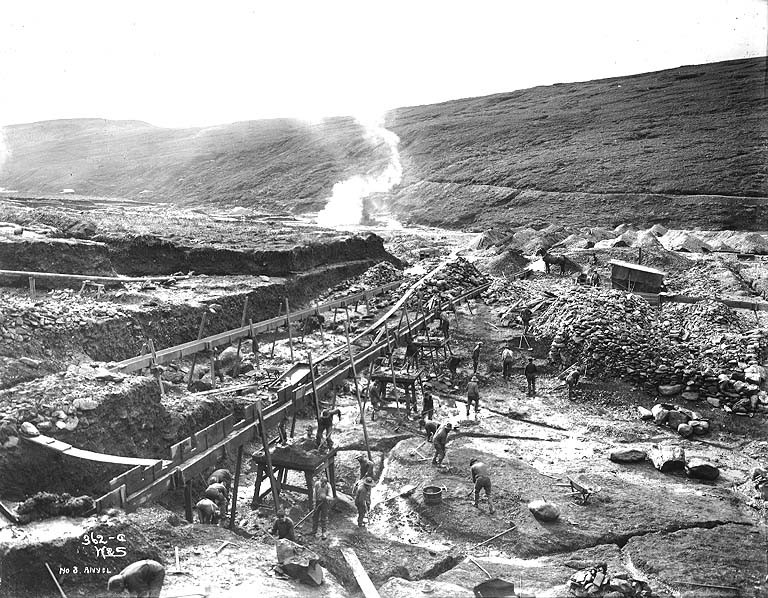
Sluicing operation on Anvil Creek ca. 1900

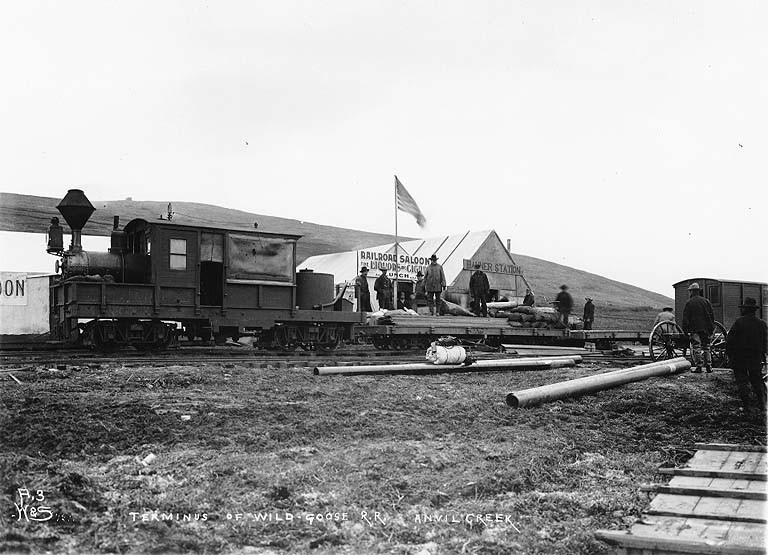
Terminus of the Wild Goose Railroad at Anvil Creek ca. 1901
