= Bluff Creek (Des Moines River tributary) =

Stream in Iowa, U.S.

Coordinates: 42°03′50″N 93°58′12″W

Bluff Creek is a stream located in the U.S. state of Iowa. It serves as a tributary to the Des Moines River.

The name "Bluff Creek" was derived from the presence of steep bluffs along its course.
