= Snake River (Nome, Alaska) =

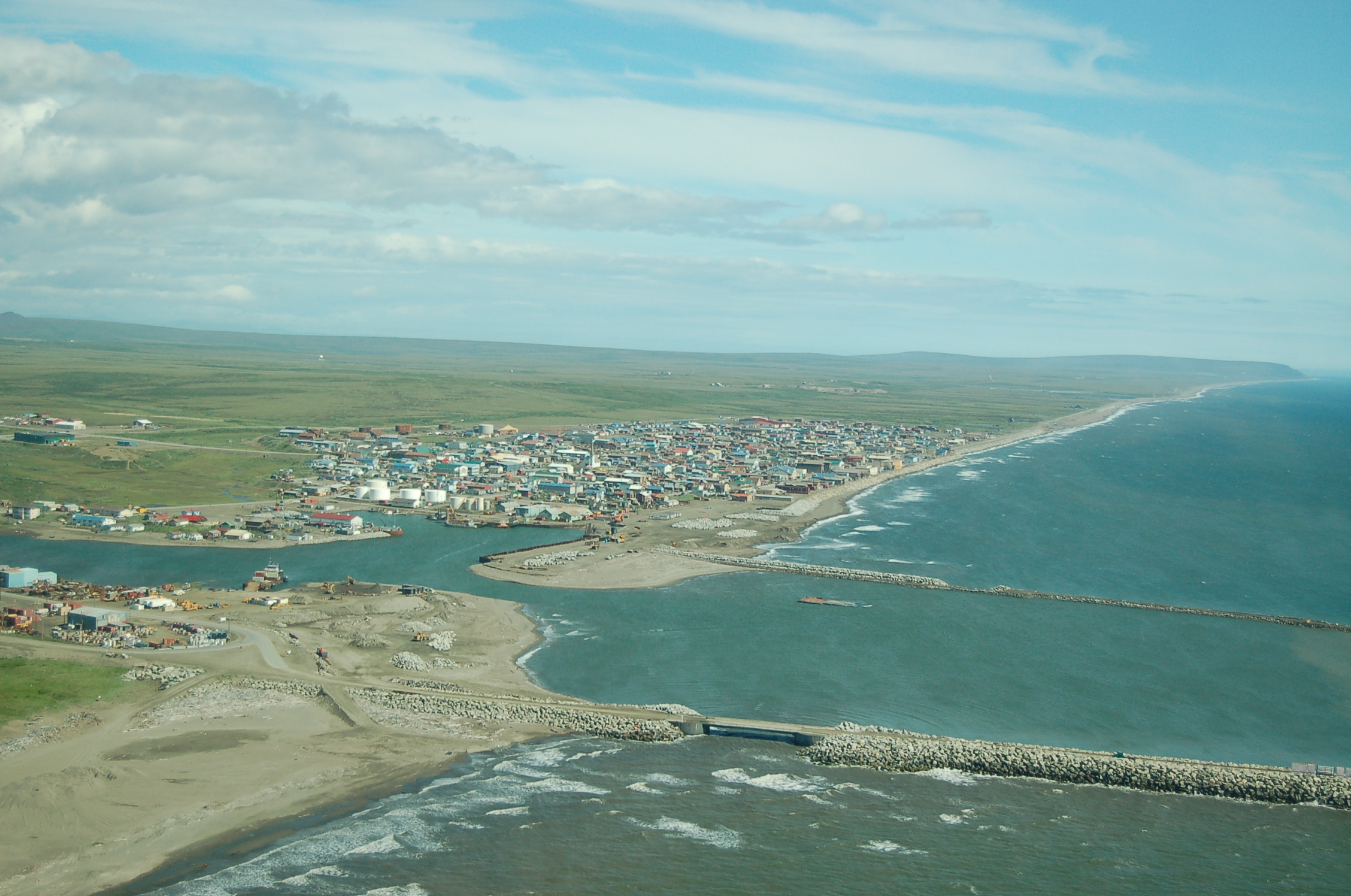
- Mouth of the Snake River at Nome

- Location of the mouth of the Snake River in Alaska

Location
- Country: United States
- State: Alaska
- District: Nome Census Area

Physical characteristics
- Source: Seward Peninsula
  - location: Confluence of Goldbottom Creek and North Fork Snake River
  - coordinates: 64°42′05″N 165°24′25″W
  - elevation: 193 ft (59 m)
- Mouth: Norton Sound, Bering Sea
  - location: Nome
  - coordinates: 64°29′55″N 165°24′47″W
  - elevation: 13 ft (4.0 m)
- Length: 20 mi (32 km)

Snake River is a waterway on the Seward Peninsula in the U.S. state of Alaska. Flowing southerly, it discharges into Norton Sound, Bering Sea, at Nome, with its mouth lying between the city's downtown area and its main airport. The river is 20 miles (32 km) long.

== Gallery ==
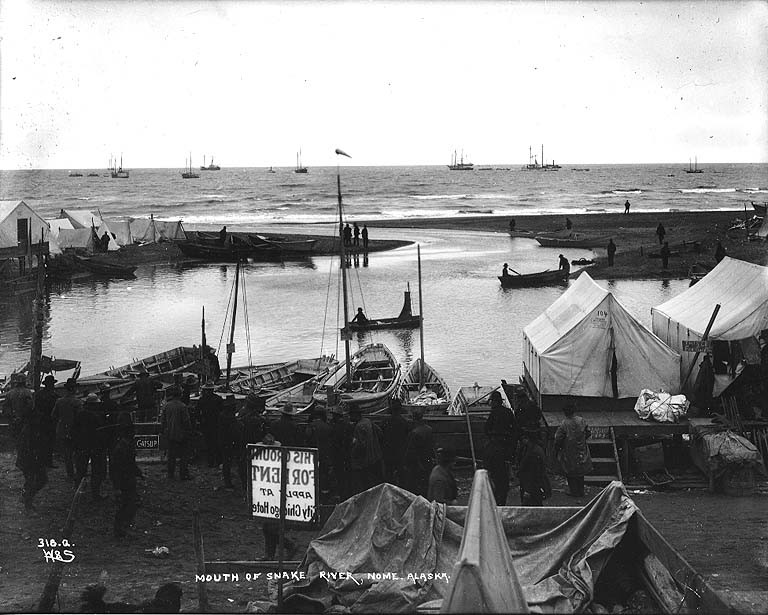
Boats and tents at the mouth of the Snake River in Nome, ca. 1900

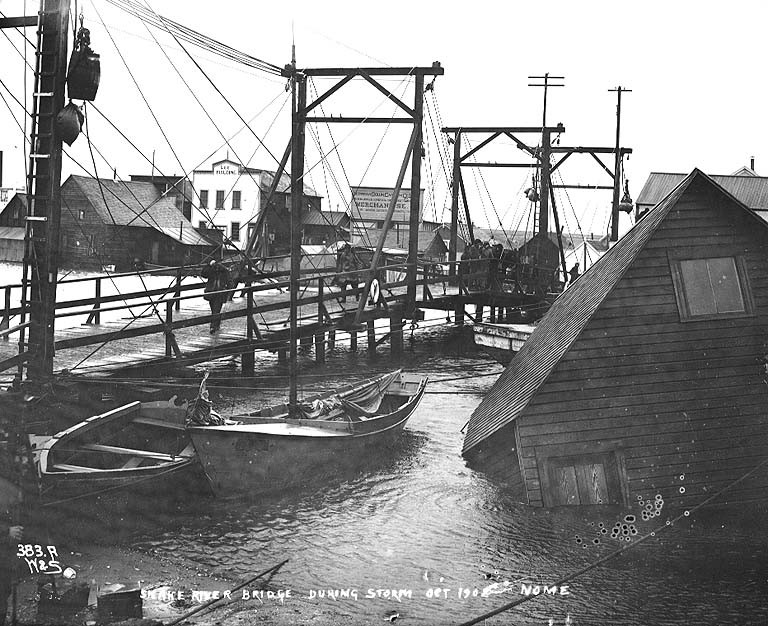
Snake River Bridge and post-storm destruction in Nome (October 1902) by Eric A. Hegg

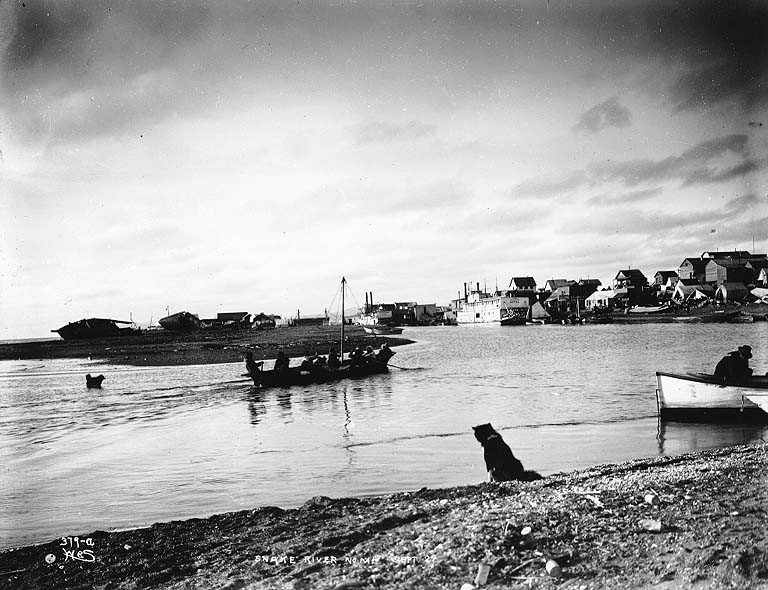
A small boat navigates the Snake River in Nome September 29, 1909

== See also ==
- List of rivers of Alaska
