= Charles D. Lane =

American businessman (1840–1911)

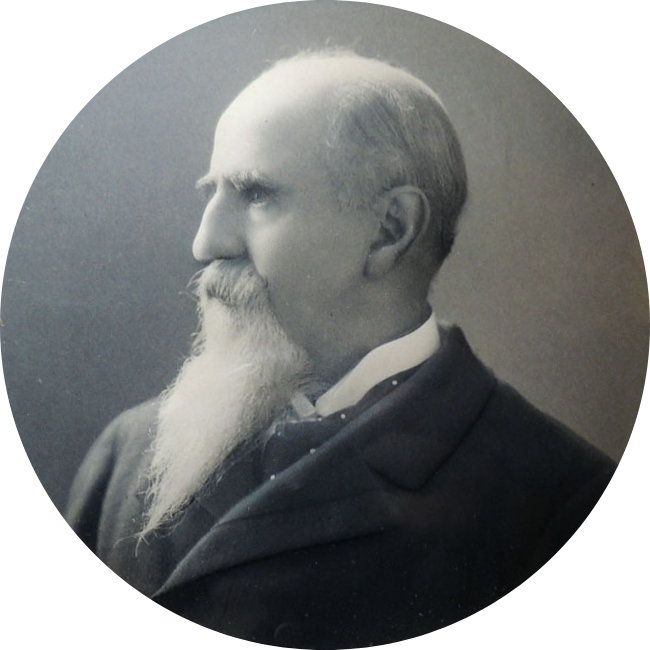
Portrait by I. W. Taber

Charles D. Lane (November 15, 1840 – 1911) was an American millionaire mine owner, who is recognized as a founder of Nome, Alaska.

== Biography ==
Lane was born in Palmyra, Missouri November 15, 1840. His parents were Virginians of Scottish descent. He moved to California with his father in 1852 and almost immediately took up mining. After an unsuccessful attempt to develop a lode mine in Nevada, he achieved his first success on the Snake River in Idaho, followed some years later by a major strike at the Utica Mine at Angels, California. Lane also developed the Fortuna Mine in Arizona.

Lane was a central figure in the industrial phase of mining on the Seward Peninsula, constructing a number of developments in support of the industry, particularly in the Nome and Council areas. An employee of Lane's, G. W. Price, was present in the Golovin Bay area late in 1898, when the three “lucky Swedes”, Jafet Lindeberg, Erik Lindblom, and John Brynteson, returned from their discovery of the rich placer deposits on tributaries of the Snake River, near what is now Nome. The three original discoverers formed a second party, including Price and a few others, and returned to the Snake River, organizing the Cape Nome mining district, and staking additional claims.

Lane quickly acquired claims in the Nome area, and in 1899 was listed as co-owner, with Price, of claim. No. 8 Above Discovery on Anvil Creek, which was worked that season. At about this time, Lane joined with capitalists from California and the East Coast to form the Wild Goose Mining & Trading Company. Beginning in 1900, the Wild Goose Company began a series of major developments in support of the early mining industry on the Seward Peninsula. These included construction of the first few miles of railroad connecting Anvil Creek to Nome and a large pumping plant that provided water for mining operations on that Creek. The company acquired large holdings on Ophir Creek in the Council area, and was involved in developments in that district, including building roads, ditches, and another railroad.

As the local representative of the Wild Goose Company, Lane was a primary defendant in the legal proceedings that attempted to invalidate the original claims on Anvil Creek. Despite the machinations of a powerful politician and a corrupt local judge, Lane and the other defendants prevailed.

Lane's tenure on the Seward Peninsula was brief. In 1905 he sold the bulk of his interests in the Wild Goose Company, and by 1911 he was dead in Palo Alto. His influence extended well beyond his lifetime, however, through the activities of the Wild Goose Company, which continued as a major actor in Seward Peninsula mining until the 1920s.

He died in 1911. He headed the Wild Goose Mining & Trading Co.

== Bibliography ==
- Brooks, Alfred H. (1908). Development of the Mining Industry. In The Gold Placers of Parts of Seward Peninsula, Alaska by A. J. Collier, F. L. Hess, P. S. Smith and A. H. Brooks, pp. 10–39. United States Geological Survey Bulletin 328. U. S. Government Printing Office, Washington.
- Harrison, E. S. (1905). Nome and Seward Peninsula: History, Description, Biographies and Stories. Souvenir Edition. Metropolitan Press, Seattle.
- McElwaine, Eugene (1901). The truth about Alaska, the golden land of the midnight sun (Public domain ed.). The author.
- Rickard, Thomas Arthur (1909). Through the Yukon and Alaska (Public domain ed.). Mining and Scientific Press. p. 305.
- Smith, Howard L. (1997). Nome River Water Control Structures. BLM-Alaska Open File Repport 62. U. S. Department of the Interior, Bureau of Land Management, Alaska State Office, Anchorage.
- Wickersham, James. (1938).Old Yukon: Tales-Trails-and Trials. West Publishing, St. Paul.
