= Carrie M. McLain =

American writer, teacher

Carrie Mary McLain
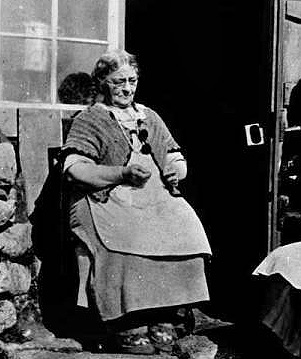
- Carrie McLain, c. 1960
- Born: Caroline Stipek; January 26, 1895; Astoria, New York
- Died: May 30, 1973 (aged 78); Palmer, Alaska
- Burial place: Nome, Alaska
- Occupation(s): Writer, teacher

Carrie Mary McLain (January 26, 1895, in Astoria, New York – 1973 in Palmer, Alaska) was an American writer and teacher known for her histories and memorabilia of Alaska.

== Biography ==
Caroline “Carrie” Mary Stipek was born in New York on January 26, 1895, to Kristiny Stipek (née Varousove) and Vaslov William Stipek. She had three sisters, Barbara, Anne and Helen, and brother Frank. In 1897, her father left New York for Alaska to join the Klondike gold rush. He returned to his New York family twice over the next eight years but with the death of his wife in 1905, he moved his five children to be with him in Nome, Alaska.

There, Carrie attended Nome high school and graduated as salutatorian in the seven-student class of 1913. When she completed additional schooling in Tacoma, Washington, she began teaching in Teller and Haycock, Alaska.

In Teller, she met a prospector, Arthur McLain, and after marrying, the couple moved to Nome where they raised four children. Carrie worked briefly as a welfare agent there and in 1943 became Nome's first woman city clerk. She remained at that job for the next 14 years.

McLain published two books: Gold Rush Nome and Pioneer Teacher. She died in the Palmer Pioneers Home on May 30, 1973, and was buried in Nome.

== Legacy ==
A community museum in Nome was named in McLain's honor.

McLain's papers and photographs are held in the Alaska and Polar Regions Collections, Elmer E. Rasmuson Library, University of Alaska Fairbanks.

== See also ==
- Nome Gold Rush
- Nome photo of McLain
