= Nome, Alaska =

City in Alaska, U.S.

Nome Sitŋasuaq (Inupiaq)
- City
- City of Nome
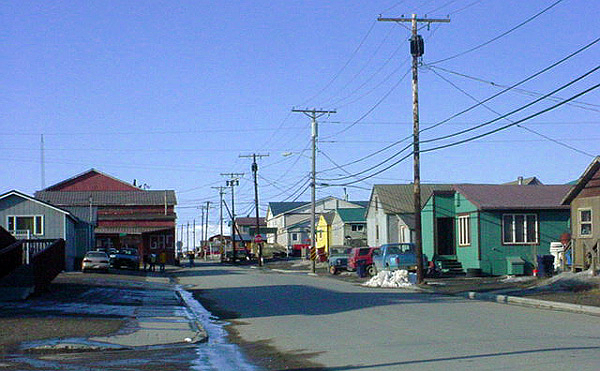
- Steadman Street in Nome, looking north from King Place, in May 2002

- Seal

- Location within Alaska Location within North America
- Coordinates: 64°30′14″N 165°23′58″W
- Country: United States
- State: Alaska
- Census Area: Nome
- Incorporated: April 12, 1901
- Founder: Jafet Lindeberg, Erik Lindblom, and John Brynteson

Government
  - Type: Council-Manager
  - Mayor: Kenny Hughes
  - State senator: Donald Olson (D)
  - State rep.: Neal Foster (D)

Area
  - Total: 21.49 sq mi (55.7 km^{2})
  - Land: 12.80 sq mi (33.2 km^{2})
  - Water: 8.69 sq mi (22.5 km^{2})
- Elevation: 20 ft (6.1 m)

Population (2020)
  - Total: 3,699
  - Density: 289.01/sq mi (111.59/km^{2})
  - Demonym: Nomeite Noman
  - Census Area: 9,492
- Time zone: UTC−9 (Alaska (AKST))
  - Summer (DST): UTC−8 (AKDT)
- ZIP Code: 99762
- Area code: 907
- FIPS code: 02-54920
- GNIS IDs: 1407125, 2419435
- Website: www.nomealaska.org

Nome (/ˈnoʊm/; Inupiaq: Sitŋasuaq, pronounced [sitŋɐsuɑq], also Sitŋazuaq, Siqnazuaq) is a city in the Nome Census Area in the Unorganized Borough of the US state of Alaska. The city is located on the southern Seward Peninsula coast on the Norton Sound of the Bering Sea. It had a population of 3,699 in 2020, up from 3,598 in 2010. Nome was incorporated on April 9, 1901. It was once the most populous city in Alaska. Nome lies within the region of the Bering Straits Native Corporation, which is headquartered in Nome.

Prior to being settled by non-indigenous people, the area around Nome was home to Iñupiat natives. The area came to world attention in 1898, when three Nordic-Americans discovered gold on the ocean shores of Nome, prompting the Nome Gold Rush. Within a year, the area became popular among miners of European descent, who built and incorporated the city. Nome quickly reached a population of more than 10,000. Gold mining supported this population into the early 1900s, but the city's population had fallen considerably by 1910.

A series of fires and violent storms destroyed most of Nome's Gold Rush era buildings between 1905 and 1974. In the winter of 1925, a diphtheria epidemic raged among Alaska Natives in the Nome area. Fierce territory-wide blizzard conditions prevented the delivery of a life-saving diphtheria antitoxin serum by airplane from Anchorage. A relay of dog sled teams was organized to deliver the serum, which was successfully led by Balto and Togo. Today, the Iditarod Dog Sled Race follows the same route they took, and ends in Nome.

In the 21st century, Nome's economy remains based around gold mining, which is now mostly carried out offshore. Nome claims to be home to the world's largest gold pan, although this claim has been disputed by the Canadian city of Quesnel, British Columbia.

== Etymology ==
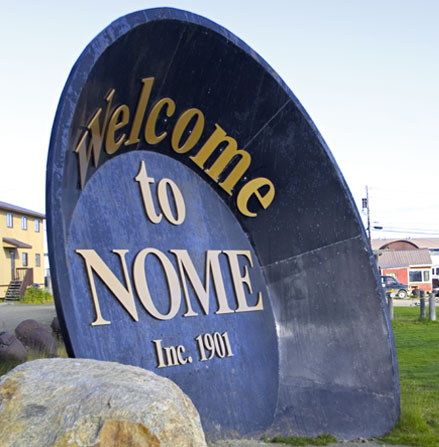
Gold Pan, Anvil City Square

The origin of the city's name "Nome" is debated. There are three theories. The first is that the name was given by Nome's founder, Jafet Lindeberg, an immigrant from Norway. Nome appears as a toponym in several places in Norway, among them Nome in Telemark.

A second theory is that Nome received its name through an error: allegedly when a British cartographer copied an ambiguous annotation made by a British officer on a nautical chart, while on a voyage up the Bering Strait. The officer had written "? Name" next to the unnamed cape. The mapmaker misread the annotation as "C. Nome", or Cape Nome, and used that name on his own chart. The city took its name from the cape. Noted toponymist and historian George R. Stewart favored this explanation, citing a letter from the British Admiralty which allegedly confirmed the story from historical records.

The third proposed origin of the name is from a misunderstanding of the local Inupiaq word for "Where at?", Naami.

In February 1899, some local miners and merchants voted to change the name from Nome to Anvil City, because of the confusion with Cape Nome, 12 miles (19 km) east, and the Nome River, the mouth of which is 4 mi (6.4 km) east of Nome. The United States Post Office in Nome refused to accept the change. Fearing a move of the post office to Nome City, a mining camp on the Nome River, the merchants unhappily agreed to change the name of Anvil City back to Nome.

== Geography and climate ==
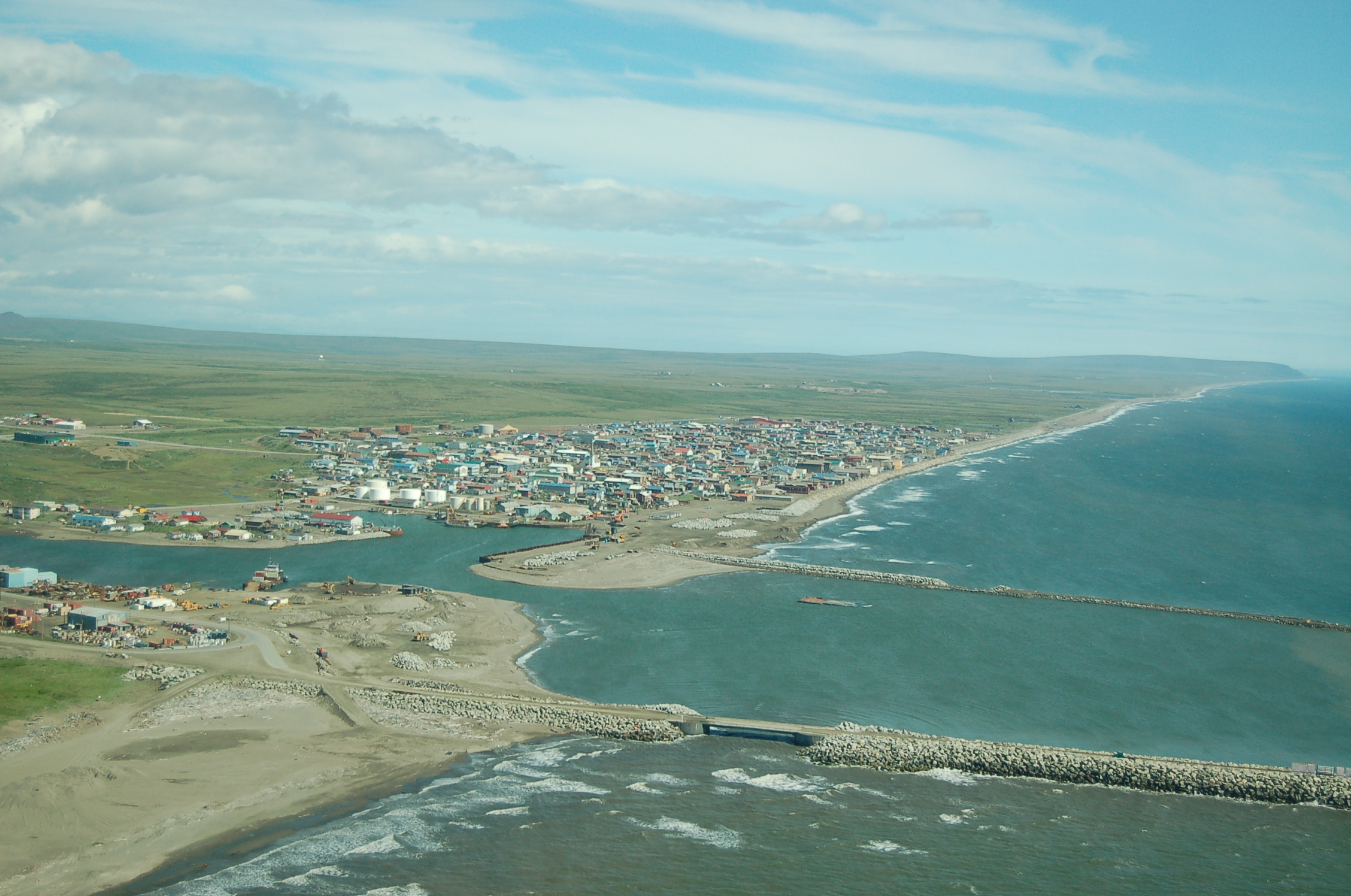
An aerial view of Nome, Alaska, July 2006

Nome is located at 64°30′14″N 165°23′58″W (64.503889, −165.399444). According to the United States Census Bureau, the city has a total area of 21.6 square miles (56 km^{2}), of which 12.5 square miles (32 km^{2}) is land and 9.1 square miles (23.6 km^{2}) (41.99%) is water.

Nome has a subarctic climate (Köppen Dfc), closely bordering on a tundra climate (Köppen ET), with long, very cold winters, and short, cool summers. Conditions in both winter and summer are moderated by the city's coastal location. Winters are less severe than in the Alaskan interior, and conversely, summers are lukewarm. For example, Fairbanks at a similar parallel quite far inland has much greater temperature swings, with both very warm and cold temperatures throughout the year. Even so, Nome is influenced by Far East Russia's cold landmass, and as a result the climate is much colder than in coastal Scandinavia at similar latitudes.

Nome's climate chart

The coldest month is January, averaging 5.6 °F (−14.7 °C). Highs on average breach the freezing point on 3–5 days per month from December to March. Annually, there have been 72 days of 0 °F (−17.8 °C) or lower temperatures recorded as early as October 12 in 1996, and as late as May 5 in 1984. Average highs stay below freezing from late October until late April. The average first and last dates of freezing lows are September 2 and June 9, respectively, a freeze-free period of 78 days.

The warmest month is July, with an average of 52.0 °F (11.1 °C). Temperatures rarely reach 80 °F (27 °C) or remain above 60 °F (16 °C) the whole night. Snow averages 82.8 inches (210 cm) per season, with the average first and last dates of measurable (≥0.1 inches or 0.25 centimetres) snowfall being October 4 and May 16. Accumulating snow has not been officially observed in July or August. Precipitation is greatest in the summer months, and averages 17.22 inches (437.4 mm) per year. The annual average temperature is 28.0 °F (−2.2 °C).

Extreme temperatures range from −54 °F (−48 °C) on January 27–28, 1989 up to 86 °F (30 °C) on June 19, 2013, and July 31, 1977. The record cold daily maximum is −40 °F (−40 °C), set on January 28–29, 1919. The record warm daily minimum is 64 °F (18 °C) on July 20, 1993, and August 14, 1926. The coldest day of the year averaged −17 °F (−27 °C) in the 1991 to 2020 normals, while the warmest night average was at 57 °F (14 °C).

The coldest has been February 1990 with a mean temperature of −17.2 °F (−27.3 °C). The warmest month was August 1977 at 56.3 °F (13.5 °C). The annual mean temperature has ranged from 21.1 °F (−6.1 °C) in 1920 to 32.5 °F (0.3 °C) in 2016.

Bering Sea water temperatures around Nome vary during summer from 36 to 50 °F (2.2 to 10.0 °C).

Climate data for Nome Airport, Alaska (1991–2020 normals, (Note: Mean monthly maxima and minima (i.e. the highest and lowest temperature readings during an entire month or year) calculated based on data at said location from 1991 to 2020.) extremes 1906–present (Note: For more information, see ThreadEx))
Month	Jan	Feb	Mar	Apr	May	Jun	Jul	Aug	Sep	Oct	Nov	Dec	Year
Record high °F (°C)	51 (11)	48 (9)	44 (7)	60 (16)	78 (26)	86 (30)	86 (30)	83 (28)	71 (22)	59 (15)	50 (10)	44 (7)	86 (30)
Mean maximum °F (°C)	34.6 (1.4)	35.3 (1.8)	34.4 (1.3)	43.3 (6.3)	63.0 (17.2)	72.8 (22.7)	74.8 (23.8)	68.7 (20.4)	60.3 (15.7)	47.5 (8.6)	38.0 (3.3)	34.0 (1.1)	77.4 (25.2)
Mean daily maximum °F (°C)	13.2 (−10.4)	16.8 (−8.4)	17.6 (−8.0)	29.4 (−1.4)	43.6 (6.4)	55.1 (12.8)	57.7 (14.3)	56.0 (13.3)	49.0 (9.4)	36.0 (2.2)	24.3 (−4.3)	16.2 (−8.8)	34.6 (1.4)
Daily mean °F (°C)	5.6 (−14.7)	9.0 (−12.8)	9.6 (−12.4)	22.7 (−5.2)	37.3 (2.9)	48.3 (9.1)	52.0 (11.1)	50.2 (10.1)	43.1 (6.2)	30.4 (−0.9)	18.2 (−7.7)	9.1 (−12.7)	28.0 (−2.2)
Mean daily minimum °F (°C)	−2.0 (−18.9)	1.3 (−17.1)	1.6 (−16.9)	15.9 (−8.9)	30.9 (−0.6)	41.5 (5.3)	46.3 (7.9)	44.4 (6.9)	37.2 (2.9)	24.9 (−3.9)	12.2 (−11.0)	2.0 (−16.7)	21.4 (−5.9)
Mean minimum °F (°C)	−28.0 (−33.3)	−26.3 (−32.4)	−20.5 (−29.2)	−7.8 (−22.1)	17.4 (−8.1)	30.9 (−0.6)	36.4 (2.4)	32.2 (0.1)	23.6 (−4.7)	8.6 (−13.0)	−8.0 (−22.2)	−21.8 (−29.9)	−31.4 (−35.2)
Record low °F (°C)	−54 (−48)	−42 (−41)	−46 (−43)	−30 (−34)	−11 (−24)	20 (−7)	28 (−2)	23 (−5)	9 (−13)	−10 (−23)	−39 (−39)	−42 (−41)	−54 (−48)
Average precipitation inches (mm)	0.94 (24)	0.99 (25)	0.74 (19)	0.74 (19)	0.89 (23)	0.99 (25)	2.35 (60)	3.22 (82)	2.20 (56)	1.84 (47)	1.27 (32)	1.05 (27)	17.22 (437)
Average snowfall inches (cm)	13.4 (34)	14.7 (37)	10.7 (27)	6.8 (17)	1.9 (4.8)	0.2 (0.51)	0.0 (0.0)	0.0 (0.0)	0.5 (1.3)	4.7 (12)	12.1 (31)	15.8 (40)	80.8 (205)
Average extreme snow depth inches (cm)	20.9 (53)	22.4 (57)	23.1 (59)	18.5 (47)	7.0 (18)	0.0 (0.0)	0.0 (0.0)	0.0 (0.0)	0.2 (0.51)	1.8 (4.6)	8.5 (22)	14.4 (37)	27.3 (69)
Average precipitation days (≥ 0.01 inch)	10.0	10.5	8.8	7.9	8.8	8.7	12.6	14.8	13.6	12.9	11.0	11.4	131.0
Average snowy days (≥ 0.1 in)	11.0	11.4	9.8	7.6	2.8	0.2	0.0	0.0	0.8	5.5	10.5	12.3	71.9
Average relative humidity (%)	72.3	69.4	70.6	73.7	73.7	74.1	78.5	79.7	75.1	74.1	74.5	71.6	73.9
Average dew point °F (°C)	0.3 (−17.6)	−3.6 (−19.8)	1.2 (−17.1)	11.5 (−11.4)	27.7 (−2.4)	37.6 (3.1)	44.8 (7.1)	44.4 (6.9)	35.1 (1.7)	20.8 (−6.2)	9.7 (−12.4)	0.3 (−17.6)	19.2 (−7.1)
Mean monthly sunshine hours	62.2	140.1	205.0	245.3	290.3	275.3	250.3	178.1	153.6	116.7	66.4	53.0	2,036.3
Percentage possible sunshine	37	59	56	54	50	43	41	35	39	39	35	41	45
Source: NOAA, sun, relative humidity, and dew point 1961–1990, snow depth 1981–2010.

See or edit raw graph data.

Climate data for Coastal sea temperature for Nome, Alaska
Month	Jan	Feb	Mar	Apr	May	Jun	Jul	Aug	Sep	Oct	Nov	Dec	Year
Daily mean °F (°C)	28.9 (−1.7)	28.9 (−1.7)	28.9 (−1.7)	28.9 (−1.7)	30.7 (−0.7)	43.0 (6.1)	50.5 (10.3)	51.4 (10.8)	47.7 (8.7)	41.2 (5.1)	31.8 (−0.1)	29.5 (−1.4)	36.8 (2.7)
Source: Seatemperature.org

== Demographics ==
Historical population
Census	Pop.	Note	%±
1900	12,488		—
1910	2,600		−79.2%
1920	852		−67.2%
1930	1,213		42.4%
1940	1,559		28.5%
1950	1,876		20.3%
1960	2,316		23.5%
1970	2,357		1.8%
1980	2,301		−2.4%
1990	3,500		52.1%
2000	3,505		0.1%
2010	3,598		2.7%
2020	3,699		2.8%
US Decennial Census

Nome first appeared on the 1900 US Census as an unincorporated village of 12,488 residents. At the time, it was the largest community in Alaska, ahead of Skagway and Juneau, the 2nd and 3rd largest places. The demographics for 1900 included 12,395 Whites, 42 Natives, 41 Asians and 10 Blacks. It was incorporated as a city in 1901. By 1910, it had fallen to 2,600 residents. Of those, 2,311 were White, 235 were Natives and 54 for all other races. It dropped to the 2nd largest city in Alaska behind Fairbanks. By 1920, it dropped to 9th place, with just 852 residents.

In 1930, it rose to 6th largest with 1,213 residents, 882 Whites, 326 Natives, 5 others. In 1940, it remained in 6th place with 1,559 residents. It dropped to 10th place in 1950 with 1,876 residents. In 1960, it rose to 8th place with 2,316 residents, with 1,608 "other", which was mostly Native, 705 Whites and 3 Blacks.

By 1970, Nome had fallen out of the top 10 Alaskan places to the 18th largest community, although it was still the 9th largest incorporated city. In 1980, Nome was the 15th largest, and the 12th largest incorporated city. In 1990, it was 16th largest, and the 12th largest incorporated city. In 2000, it was 25th largest, and the 16th largest incorporated city. In 2010, it was the 30th largest, and the 16th largest incorporated city.

The population of Nome is a mixture of Inupiat Eskimos and non-Natives. Although some employment opportunities are available, subsistence activities are prevalent in the community. A federally recognized tribe is located in the community, the Nome Eskimo Community. Former villagers from King Island also live in Nome. The ANCSA village corporation in Nome is Sitnasuak Native Corporation.

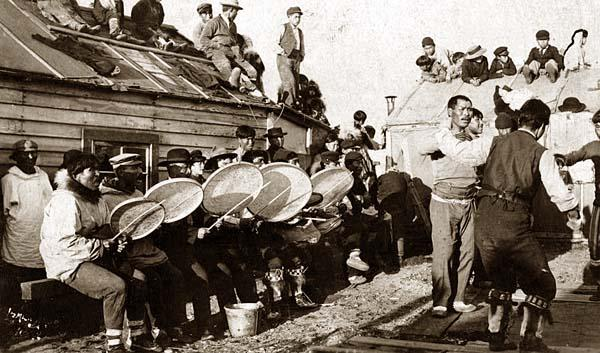
Inuit music and dance near Nome, 1900

=== Racial and ethnic composition ===
Nome city, Alaska – Racial and ethnic composition Note: the US Census treats Hispanic/Latino as an ethnic category. This table excludes Latinos from the racial categories and assigns them to a separate category. Hispanics/Latinos may be of any race.
Race / Ethnicity (NH = Non-Hispanic)	Pop 2000	Pop 2010	Pop 2020	% 2000	% 2010	% 2020
White alone (NH)	1,308	1,063	961	37.32%	29.54%	25.98%
Black or African American alone (NH)	30	18	32	0.86%	0.50%	0.87%
Native American or Alaska Native alone (NH)	1,766	1,955	1,878	50.39%	54.34%	50.77%
Asian alone (NH)	54	75	78	1.54%	2.08%	2.11%
Native Hawaiian or Pacific Islander alone (NH)	2	9	3	0.06%	0.25%	0.08%
Other race alone (NH)	1	8	20	0.03%	0.22%	0.54%
Mixed race or Multiracial (NH)	272	385	607	7.76%	10.70%	16.41%
Hispanic or Latino (any race)	72	85	120	2.05%	2.36%	3.24%
Total	3,505	3,598	3,699	100.00%	100.00%	100.00%

=== 2020 census ===
As of the 2020 census, Nome had a population of 3,699. The median age was 32.5 years. 28.4% of residents were under the age of 18 and 8.9% of residents were 65 years of age or older. For every 100 females there were 106.6 males, and for every 100 females age 18 and over there were 113.5 males age 18 and over.

0.0% of residents lived in urban areas, while 100.0% lived in rural areas.

There were 1,246 households in Nome, of which 39.6% had children under the age of 18 living in them. Of all households, 33.7% were married-couple households, 26.2% were households with a male householder and no spouse or partner present, and 26.4% were households with a female householder and no spouse or partner present. About 27.5% of all households were made up of individuals and 6.4% had someone living alone who was 65 years of age or older.

There were 1,491 housing units, of which 16.4% were vacant. The homeowner vacancy rate was 0.9% and the rental vacancy rate was 6.5%.

Racial composition as of the 2020 census
Race	Number	Percent
White	979	26.5%
Black or African American	33	0.9%
American Indian and Alaska Native	1,904	51.5%
Asian	79	2.1%
Native Hawaiian and Other Pacific Islander	3	0.1%
Some other race	41	1.1%
Two or more races	660	17.8%
Hispanic or Latino (of any race)	120	3.2%

=== 2000 census ===
In the 2000 United States census, there were 3,505 people, 1,184 households, and 749 families in the city. The population density was 279.7 inhabitants per square mile (108.0/km^{2}). There were 1,356 housing units at an average density of 108.2 per square mile (41.8/km^{2}). The racial makeup of the city was 51.0% Native American, 37.9% White, 1.5% Asian, 0.9% Black or African American, 0.1% Pacific Islander, 0.4% from other races, and 8.2% from two or more races, Hispanic or Latino of any race were 2.2% of the population.

There were 1,184 households, out of which 38.9% had children under the age of 18 living with them, 41.7% were married couples living together, 12.3% had a female householder with no husband present, and 36.7% were non-families. 27.4% of all households were made up of individuals, and 3.7% had someone living alone who was 65 years of age or older. The average household size was 2.79 and the average family size was 3.45.

The city population contained 31.9% under the age of 18, 8.0% from 18 to 24, 32.1% from 25 to 44, 21.7% from 45 to 64, and 6.2% who were 65 years of age or older. The median age was 32 years. For every 100 females, there were 115.2 males. For every 100 females age 18 and over, there were 117.8 males.

The median income for a household in the city was $59,402, and the median income for a family was $68,804. Males had a median income of $50,521 versus $35,804 for females. The per capita income for the city was $23,402. About 5.4% of families and 6.3% of the population were below the poverty line, including 4.3% under the age of 18 and 6.9% ages 65 or older.

== History ==
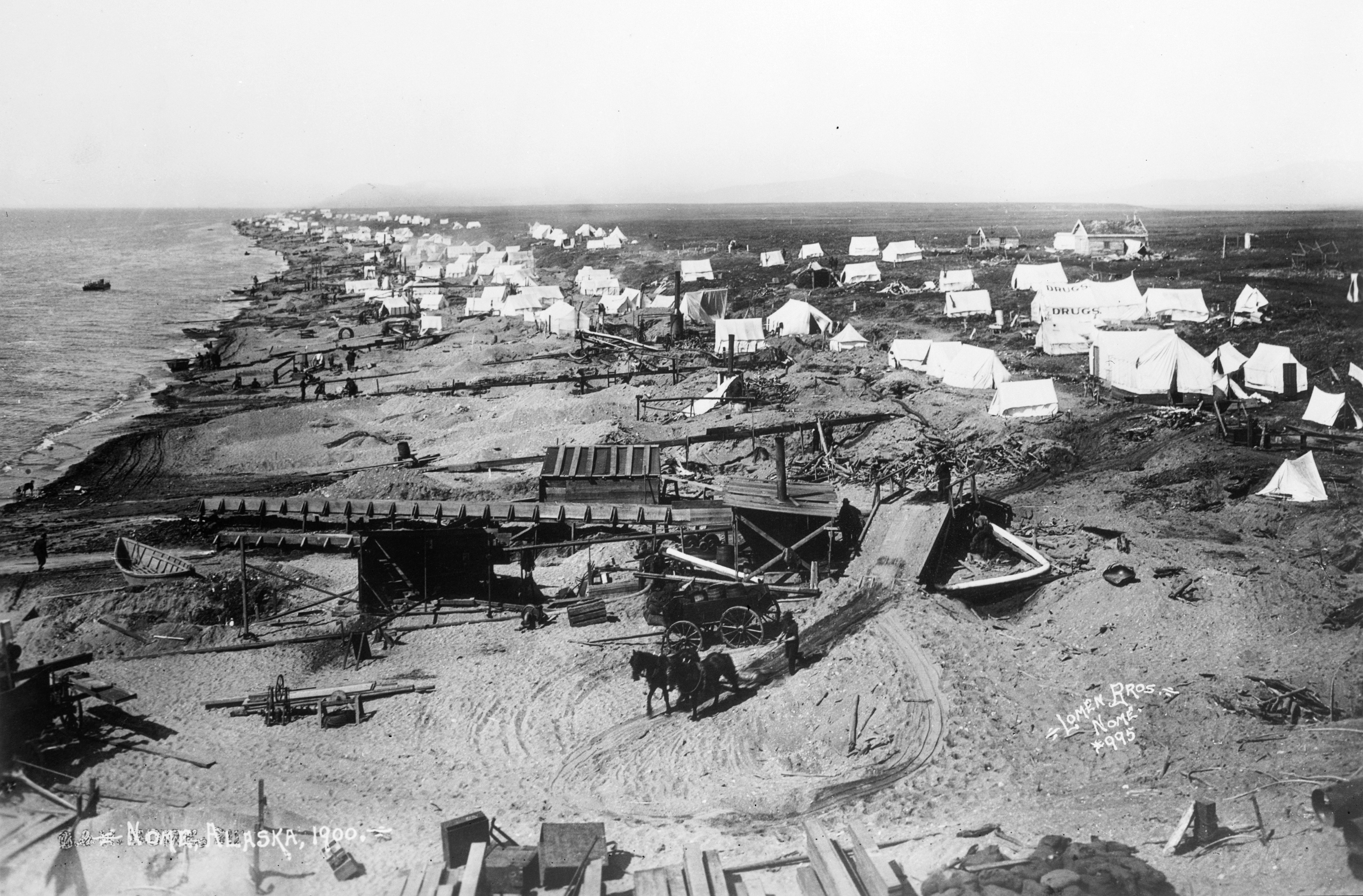
Nome, 1900

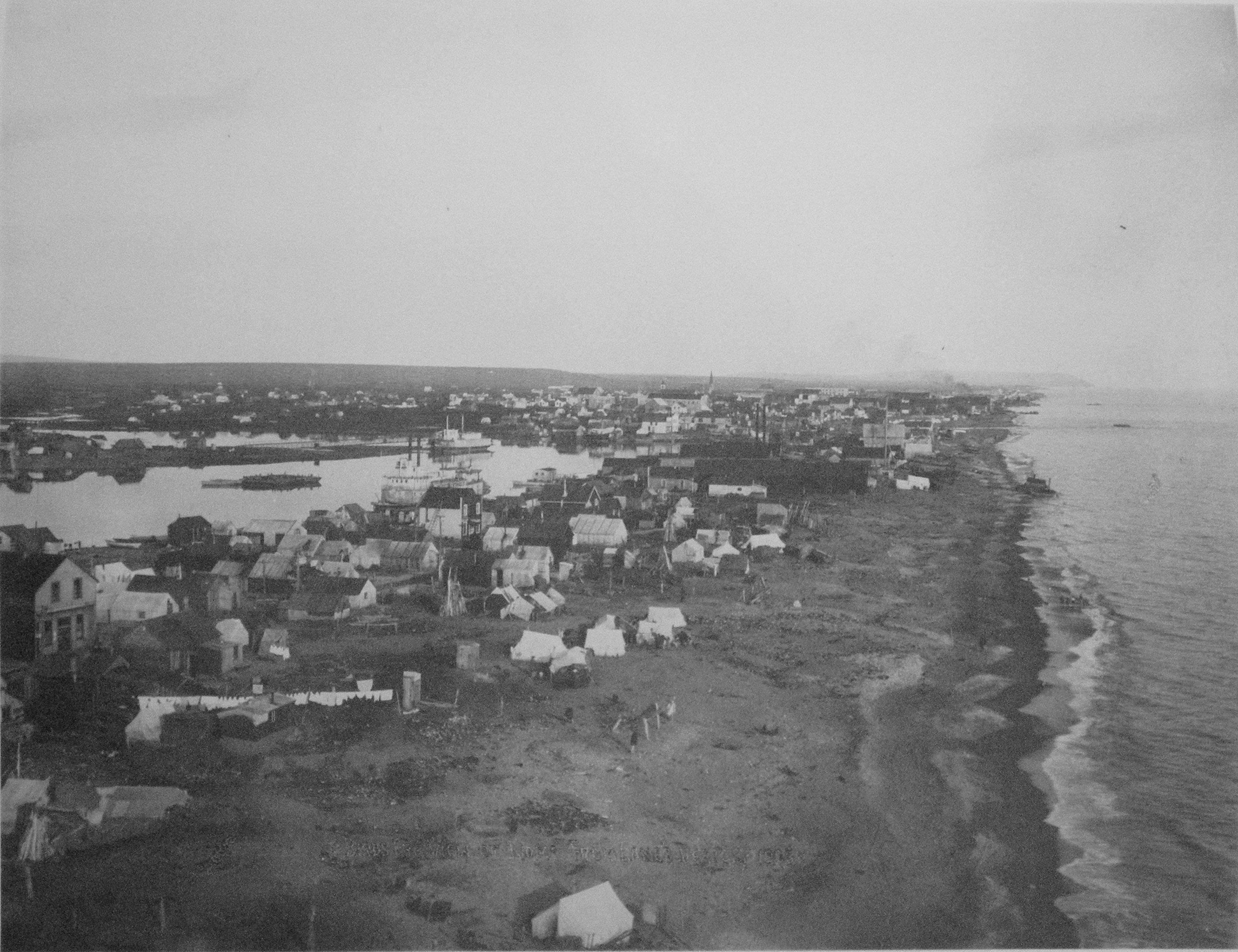
By 1907, houses had replaced the tents.

=== Pre-Goldrush ===
Inupiat hunted for game on the west coast of Alaska from prehistoric times. There is recent archeological evidence to suggest that there was an Inupiat settlement at Nome, known in Inupiat as Sitnasuak, before the discovery of gold.

=== Gold rush ===
In the summer of 1898, the "Three Lucky Swedes": Norwegian-American Jafet Lindeberg, and two naturalized American citizens of Swedish birth, Erik Lindblom and John Brynteson, discovered gold on Anvil Creek. News of the discovery reached the outside world that winter. By 1899, Nome had a population of 10,000 and the area was organized as the Nome mining district. In 1899, gold was found in the beach sands for dozens of miles along the coast at Nome, which spurred the stampede to new heights. Thousands more people poured into Nome during the spring of 1900 aboard steamships from the ports of Seattle and San Francisco. By 1900, a tent city on the beaches and on the treeless coast reached 48 km (30 mi), from Cape Rodney to Cape Nome. In June 1900, Nome averaged 1,000 newcomers a day.

In 1899, Charles D. Lane founded the Wild Goose Mining & Trading Co. His company constructed the Wild Goose Railroad from Nome to Dexter Discovery. It was extended in 1906–1908 to the village of Shelton, also known as Lanes Landing.

Many late-comers tried to "jump" the original claims by filing mining claims covering the same ground. The federal judge for the area ruled the original claims valid, but some of the claim jumpers agreed to share their invalid claims with influential Washington politicians. Alexander McKenzie took an interest in the gold rush and secured the appointment of Arthur Noyes as the federal district judge for the Nome region for the purpose of taking control of gold placer mines in Nome. McKenzie seized mining claims with an unlawfully procured receivership granted by Judge Noyes. McKenzie's claim-jumping scheme was eventually stopped by the federal Ninth Circuit Court of Appeals.

The practice provided the plot for Rex Beach's best-selling 1906 novel The Spoilers, which was made into a stage play, then five films, including one starring John Wayne: The Spoilers, co-starring Marlene Dietrich. The similarly themed Wayne film North to Alaska also takes place in the environs of Nome, and mentions Nome in its theme song. Wyatt Earp, of Tombstone, Arizona, fame, lived in Nome during gold-rush days. In September 1899, Earp and partner Charles E. Hoxie built the Dexter Saloon, the city's first two-story wooden building and its largest and most luxurious saloon out of more than 60 saloons.

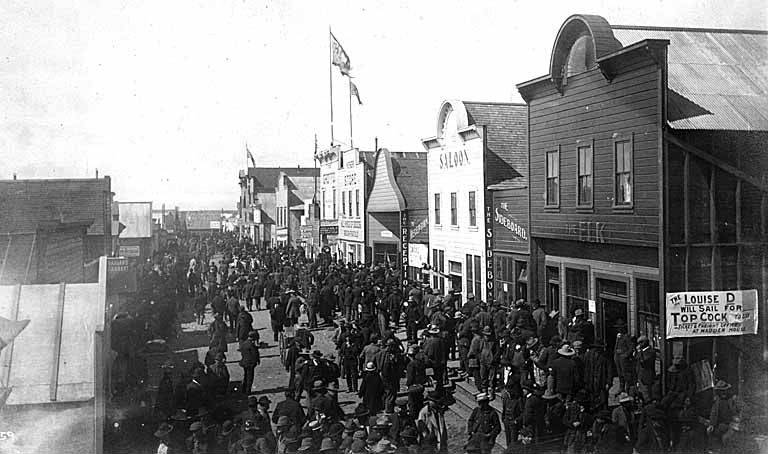
Street scene, Nome, c. 1907

Between 1900 and 1909, estimates of Nome's population reached as high as 20,000. The highest recorded population of Nome, in the 1900 United States Census, was 12,488. At this time, Nome was the largest city in the Alaska Territory. Early in this period, the U.S. Army policed the area, and expelled any inhabitant each autumn who did not have shelter, or the resources to pay for shelter, for the harsh winter.

In 1910, Nome's population had fallen to 2,600, and by 1934, to less than 1,500.

In May 1910, the Industrial Worker, the newspaper of the Industrial Workers of the World (IWW), published a notice from the Nome Miners' Union and Local 240 of the Western Federation of Miners for all unemployed workers to stay away, saying that "All the rich mines are practically worked out."

Fires in 1905 and 1934, and violent storms in 1900, 1913, 1945 and 1974, destroyed much of Nome's gold rush-era architecture. The pre-fire "Discovery Saloon" is now a private residence and is being slowly restored as a landmark.

The Black Wolf Squadron, under the command of Capt. St. Clair Streett, landed here on August 23, 1920, after the culmination of a 4,527-mile flight from Mitchel Field. Noel Wien and Gene Miller based their air services from Nome in June 1927.

=== Serum run ===
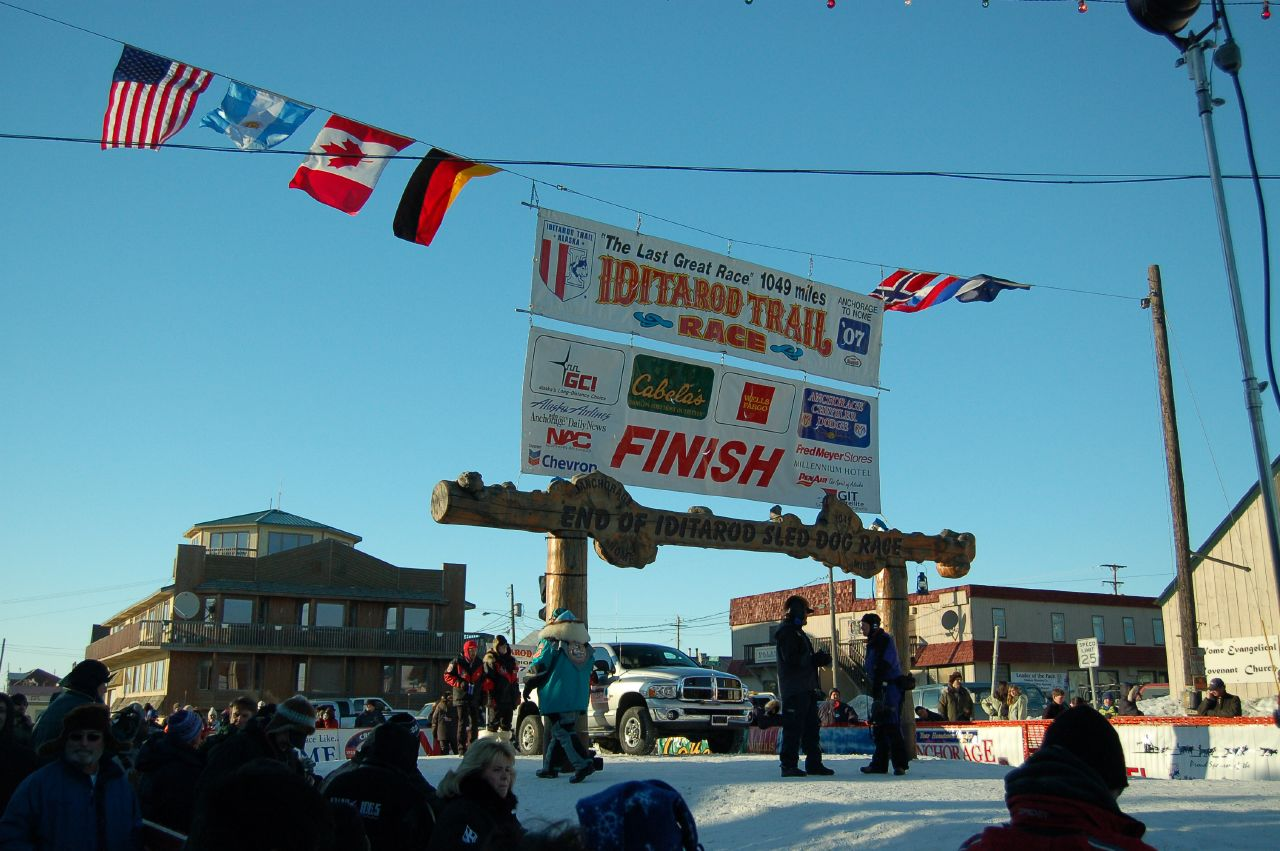
The annual Iditarod Trail Sled Dog Race, which finishes in Nome, commemorates the 1925 serum run.

In 1925, Nome was the destination of the famous Great Race of Mercy, in which dog sleds played a large part in transporting diphtheria antitoxin serum through harsh conditions. In 1973, Nome became the ending point of the 1,049+ mi (1,600+ km) Iditarod Trail Sled Dog Race. The latter part of its route was used in the serum run.

The sled driver of the final leg of the relay was the Norwegian-born Gunnar Kaasen. His lead sled dog was Balto. A statue of Balto by F.G. Roth stands near the Central Park Zoo in Central Park, New York City. Leonhard Seppala ran the penultimate, and longest, leg of the 1925 serum run to Nome. One of his dogs, Togo, is considered the forgotten hero of the Great Race of Mercy. Another of his dogs, Fritz, is preserved and on display at the Carrie M. McLain Memorial Museum in Nome.

=== World War II and later ===
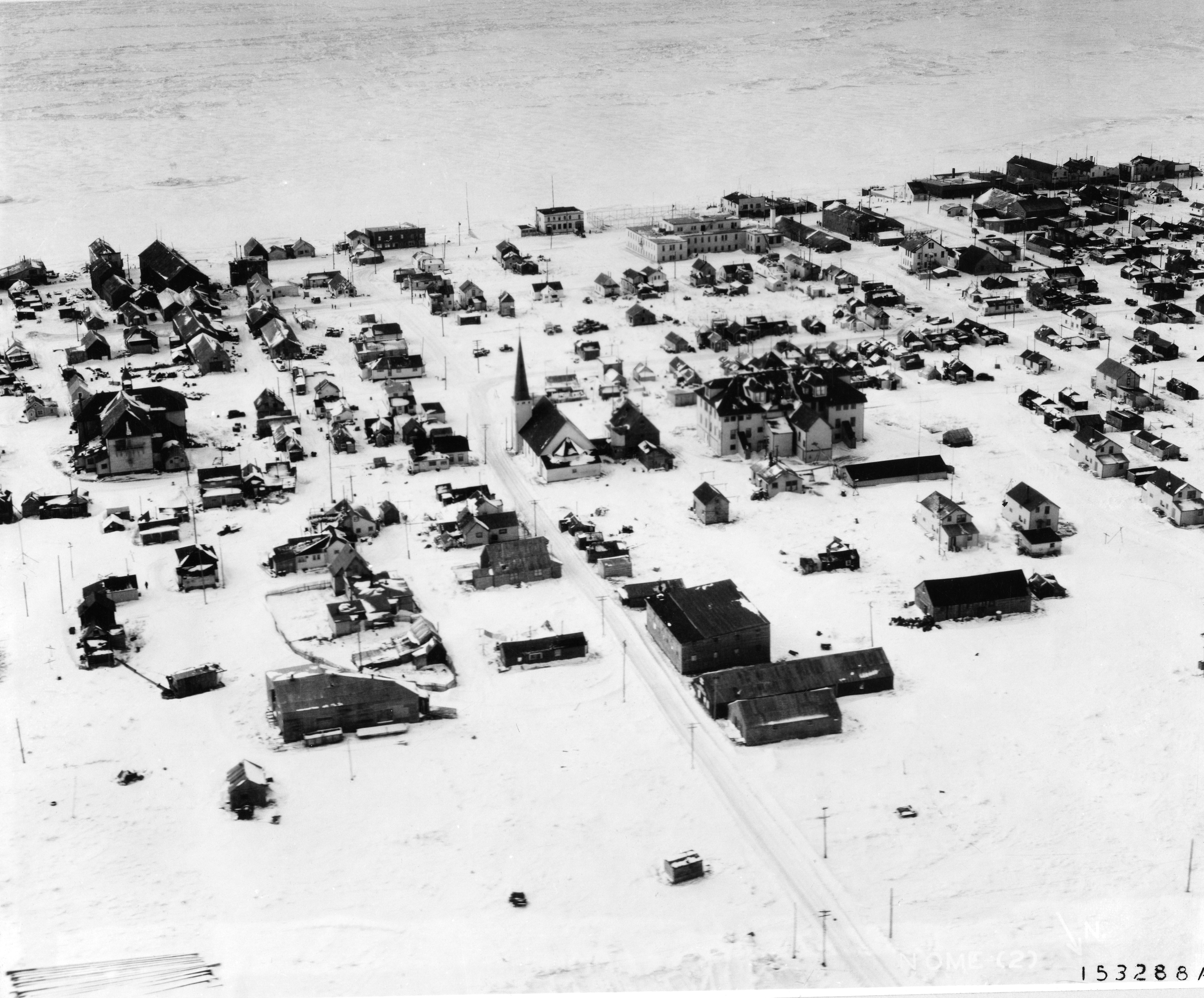
Winter in the 1940s

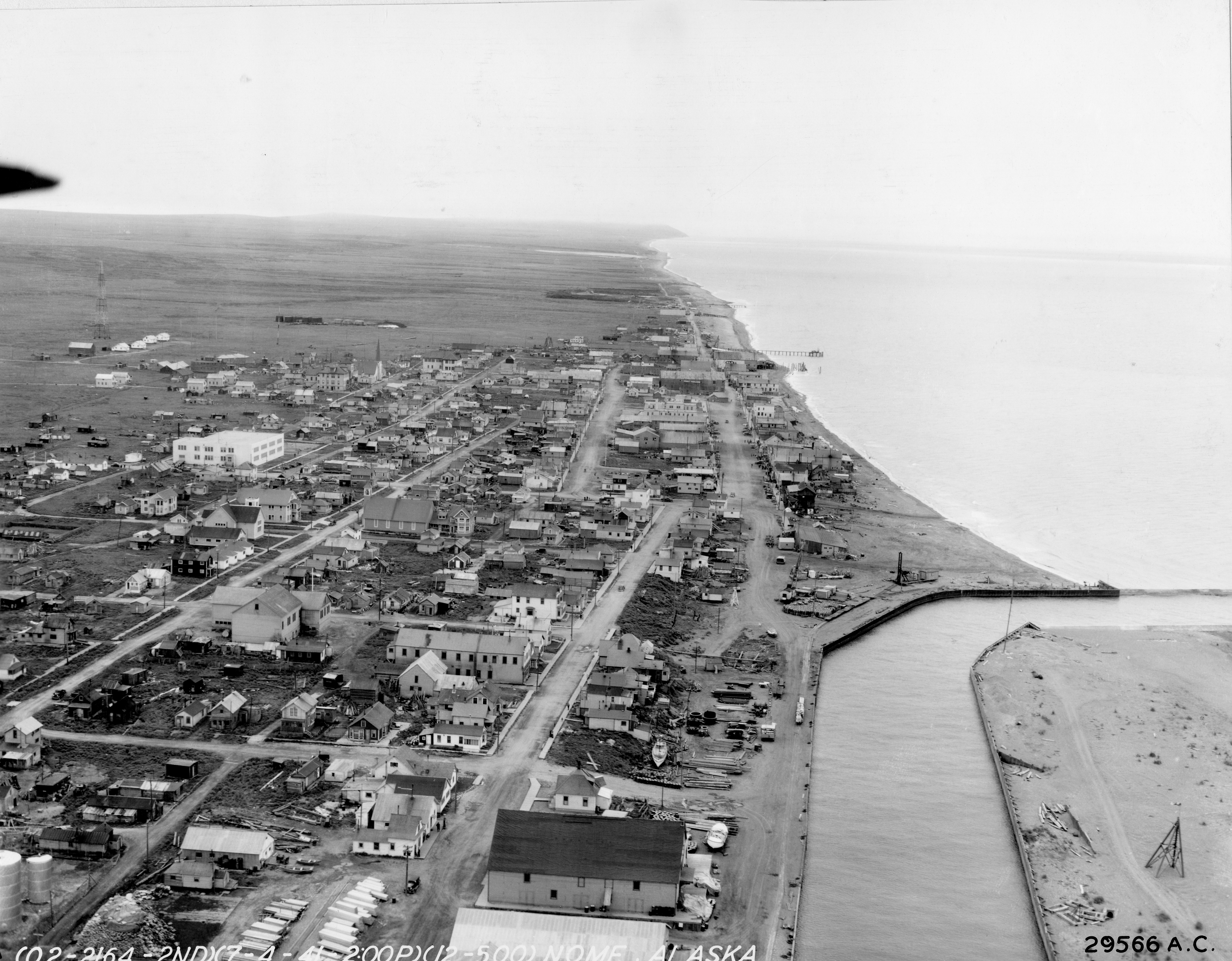
Summer in the 1940s

During World War II, Nome was the last stop on the ferry system for planes flying from the United States to the Soviet Union for the Lend-lease program. The airstrip currently in use was built, and troops were stationed there. One "Birchwood" hangar remains and has been transferred to a local group with hopes to restore it. It is not located on the former Marks Air Force Base, now the primary Nome Airport. Rather, it is a remnant of an auxiliary landing field a mile or so away: "Satellite Field". In the hills north of Nome, there were auxiliary facilities associated with the Distant Early Warning system that are visible from Nome but are no longer in use.

Total gold production for the Nome district has been at least 3.6 million troy ounces (110,000 kg).

Nome's population decline continued after 1910 although at a fairly slow rate. By 1950 Nome had 1,852 inhabitants. By 1960 the population of Nome had climbed to 2,316. At this point placer gold mining was still the leading economic activity. The local Alaska Native population was involved in ivory carving and the U.S. military had stationed troops in the city also contributing to the local economy. In 1995, Nome was "connected to the Internet."

The Hope Sled Dog Race was run between Anadyr, Russia, and Nome after the fall of the Soviet Union. The race continued for more than a decade, but has not been run since approximately 2004.

== Economy ==
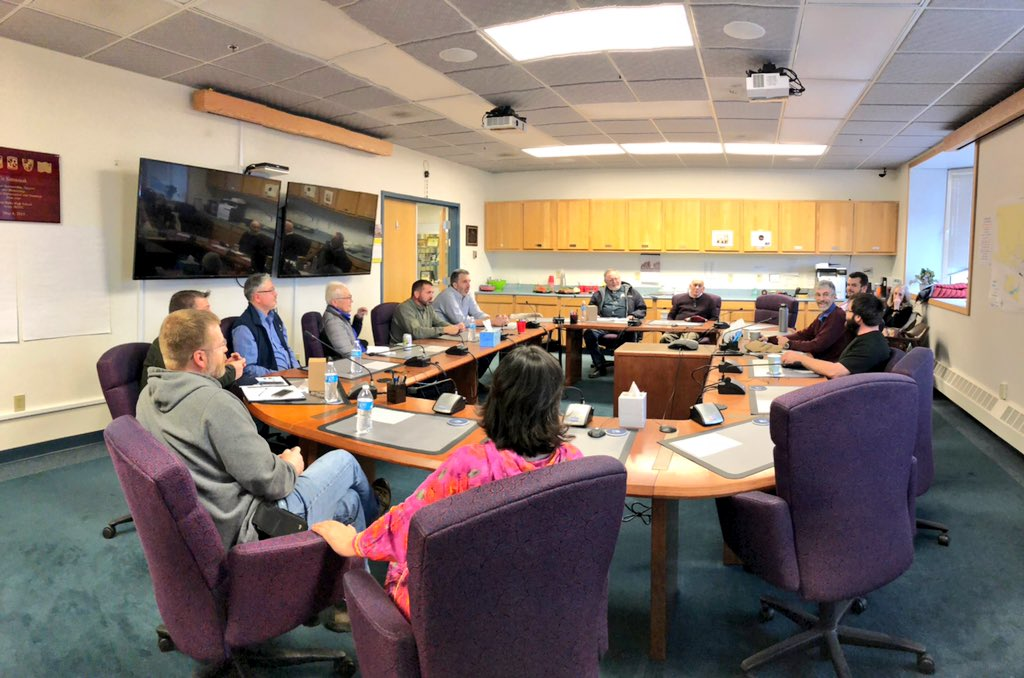
The Nome Chamber of Commerce meets with Don Young, Alaska's at-large member of the U.S. House of Representatives, in October 2018

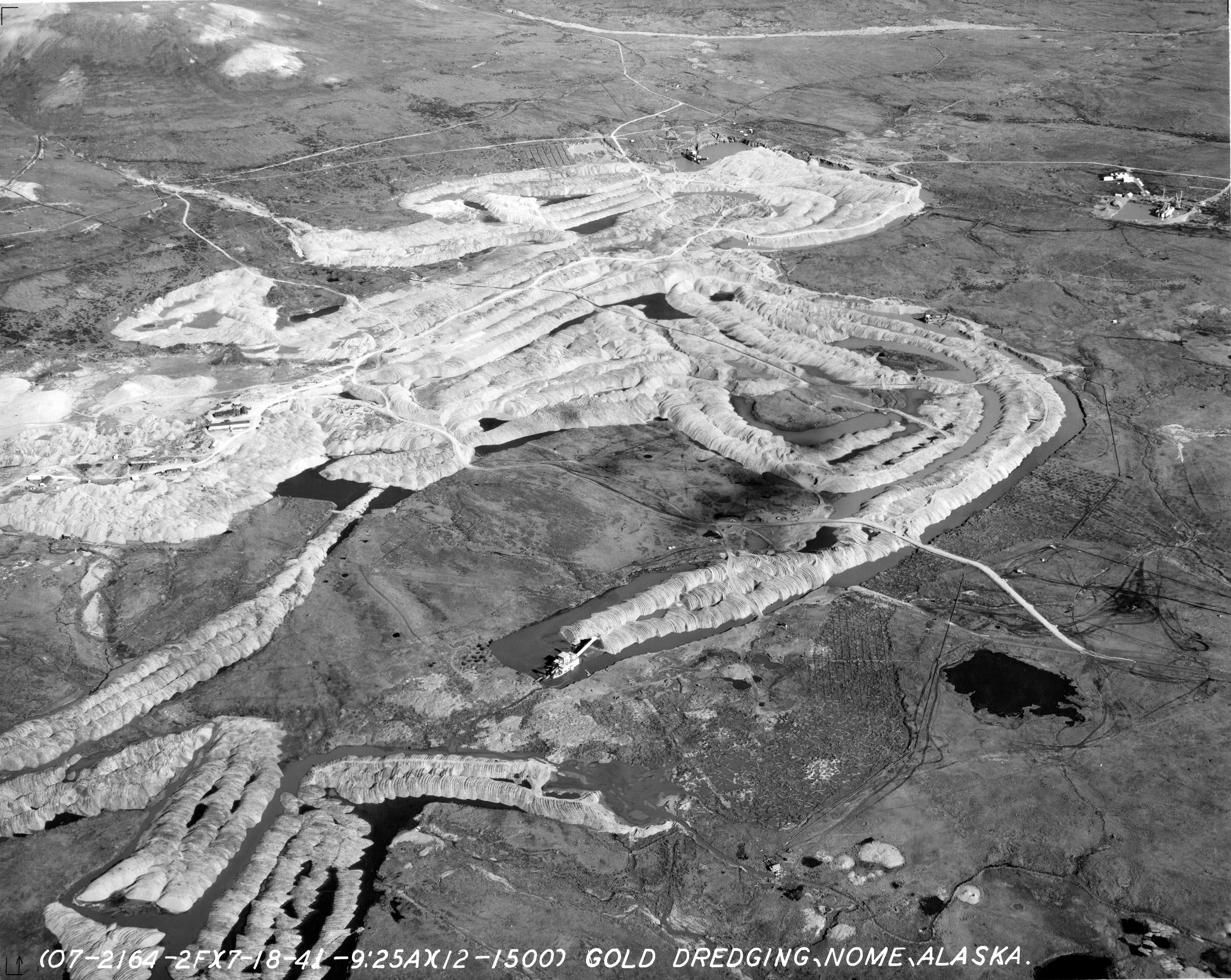
Gold mining in Nome, 1940s

Gold mining has been a major source of employment and revenue for Nome through to the present day. Mining's contribution to the town was estimated at $6 million a year in 1990 (~$13 million in 2025), before a major increase in the price of gold brought renewed interest to offshore leases, where 1,000,000 ounces (28,000,000 g) of gold were estimated to be in reserve and a subsequent boom in revenues and employment.

The Discovery Channel has featured 15 seasons of "Bering Sea Gold" concerning offshore efforts to dredge gold both in summer and winter; in the latter season access is gained by making holes in the ice and sending a diver beneath to dredge the sea floor.

== Education ==
=== Higher education ===
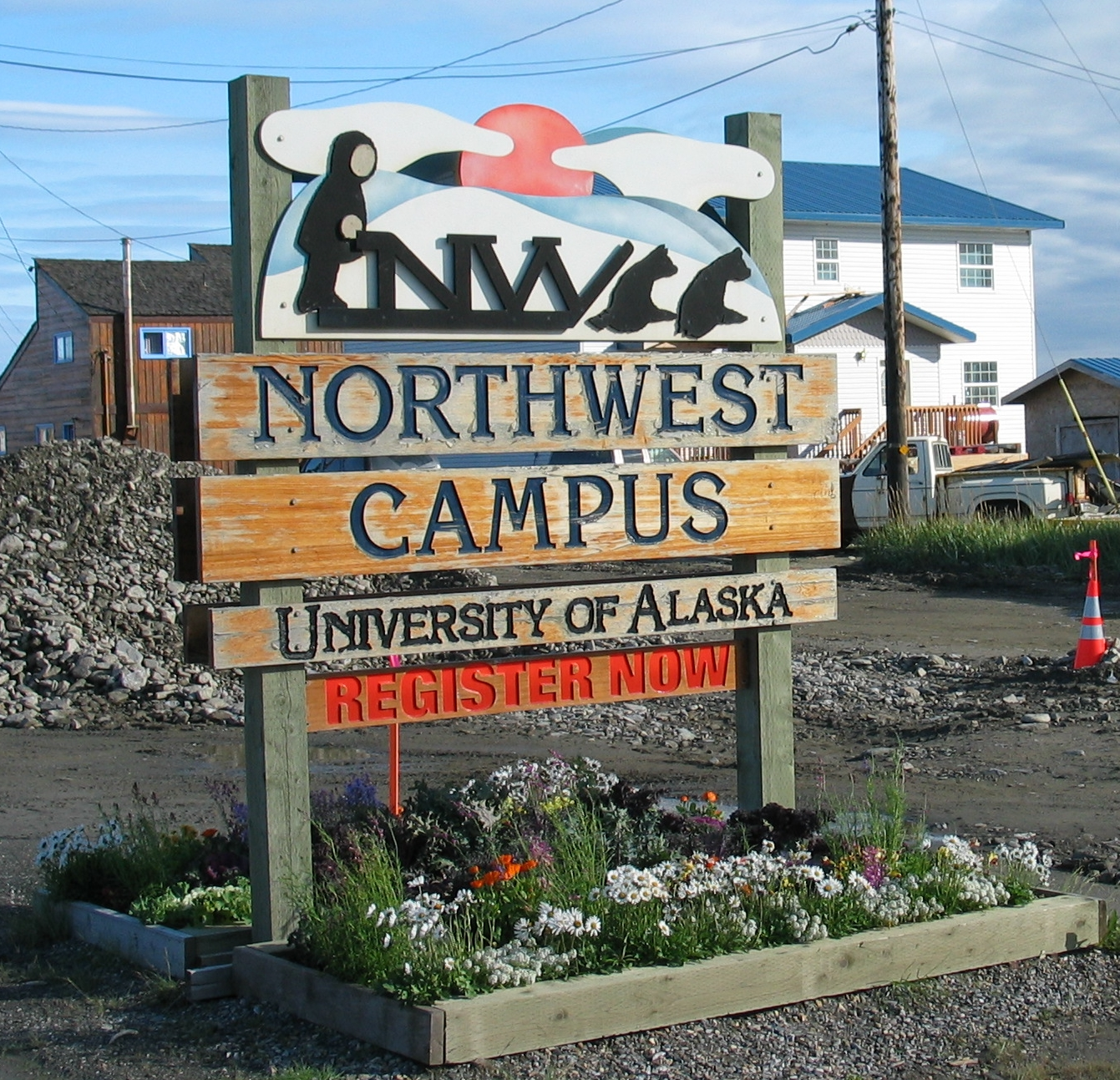
Northwest Campus sign

The University of Alaska Fairbanks operates a regional satellite facility in Nome called the Northwest Campus, formerly known as Northwest Community College.

=== Public schools ===
Nome is served by Nome Public Schools. The following public schools are attended by over 720 students:

- Anvil City Science Academy, a 5–8 charter magnet, is also part of the school district.
- Extensions Correspondence School
- Nome-Beltz Junior/Senior High School, serves grades 7–12.
- Nome Elementary School, serves grades K–6.
- Nome Youth Facility.

=== Private schools ===
- Nome Adventist School, a private school encompassing grades 1 through 9.

== Media ==
Nome's airwaves are filled by the radio stations KNOM (780 AM, 96.1 FM) and KICY (850 AM, 100.3 FM), plus a repeater of Fairbanks' KUAC, K217CK, on 91.3 FM.

Cable television and broadband in Nome is serviced by GCI, which has all popular cable channels, plus most of Anchorage's television stations. Nome has three local low-powered stations, K09OW channel 9 and K13UG channel 13, both carrying programming from ARCS, plus K11TH channel 11, a 3ABN owned and operated translator.

Nome is home to Alaska's oldest newspaper, the Nome Nugget.

== Transportation ==
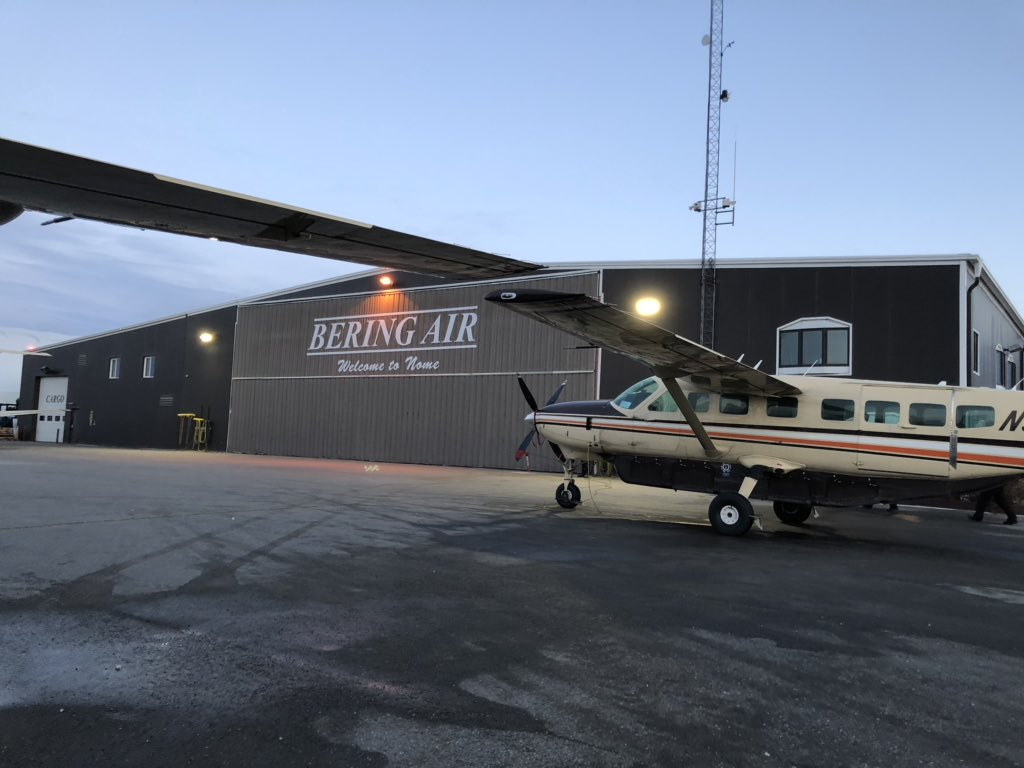
Nome Airport

=== Airports ===
Nome is a regional center of transportation for surrounding villages. There are two state-owned airports:

- Nome Airport – A public-use airport located two nautical miles (3.7 km) west of the central business district of Nome. It has two asphalt paved runways: 3/21 measures 5,576 x 150 feet (1,700 × 46 m) and 10/28 is 6,001 x 150 feet (1,829 × 46 m). An $8.5 million airport improvement project is nearing completion.
- Nome City Field – A public-use airport located one nautical mile (1.85 km) north of the central business district of Nome. It has one runway designated 3/21 with a gravel surface measuring 1,950 feet. It is used by general aviation.

=== Water ports ===
Nome seaport is used by freight ships and cruise ships, located at 64.5°N and 165.4°W on the southern side of the Seward Peninsula in Norton Sound. The Corps of Engineers completed the Nome Harbor Improvements Project in the summer of 2006 adding a 3,025 ft (922 m) breakwater east of the existing Causeway and a 270 ft (82 m) spur on the end of the Causeway making it to a total of 2,982 feet (909 m). The City Dock (south) on the Causeway is equipped with marine headers to handle the community's bulk cargo and fuel deliveries.

The City Dock is approximately 200 feet (61 m) in length with a depth of 22.5 feet (MLLW). The WestGold Dock (north) is 190 feet (58 m) in length with the same depth of 22.5 feet (ML, LW). The Westgold dock handles nearly all of the exported rock/gravel for this region and is the primary location to load/unload heavy equipment. The opening between the new breakwater and the Causeway (Outer Harbor Entrance) is approximately 500 feet (150 m) in width and serves as access to both Causeway deep water docks and the new Snake River entrance that leads into the Small Boat Harbor.

The old entrance along the seawall has been filled in and is no longer navigable (see photos on website). Buoys outline the navigation channel from the outer harbor entrance into the inner harbor. The Nome Small Boat Harbor has a depth of 10 feet (MLLW) and offers protected mooring for recreational and fishing vessels alongside two floating docks. Smaller cargo vessels and landing craft load village freight and fuel at the east, west and south inner harbor sheet pile docks, east beach landing and west barge ramp for delivery in the region.

An addition to the Nome facility in 2005 was a 60-foot-wide (18 m) concrete barge ramp located inside the inner harbor just west of the Snake River entrance. The ramp provides the bulk cargo carriers with a location closer to the causeway to trans-load freight to landing craft and roll equipment on and off barges. This location also has 2 acres (8,100 m^{2}) of uplands to be used for container, vessel and equipment storage.

In 2025, President Trump expressed interest in redeveloping the Port of Nome to become the first Arctic deepwater port in the United States. It is part of his larger goals to compete with Russia and China in the region. As Nome is struggling with "economic stagnation", some locals were hopeful of the project's effects, including the director of the Port of Nome, Joy Baker. The nearly $400 million plan includes digging approximately 18 additional feet of depth, bringing the port to a total depth of 40 feet.

=== Surface transportation ===
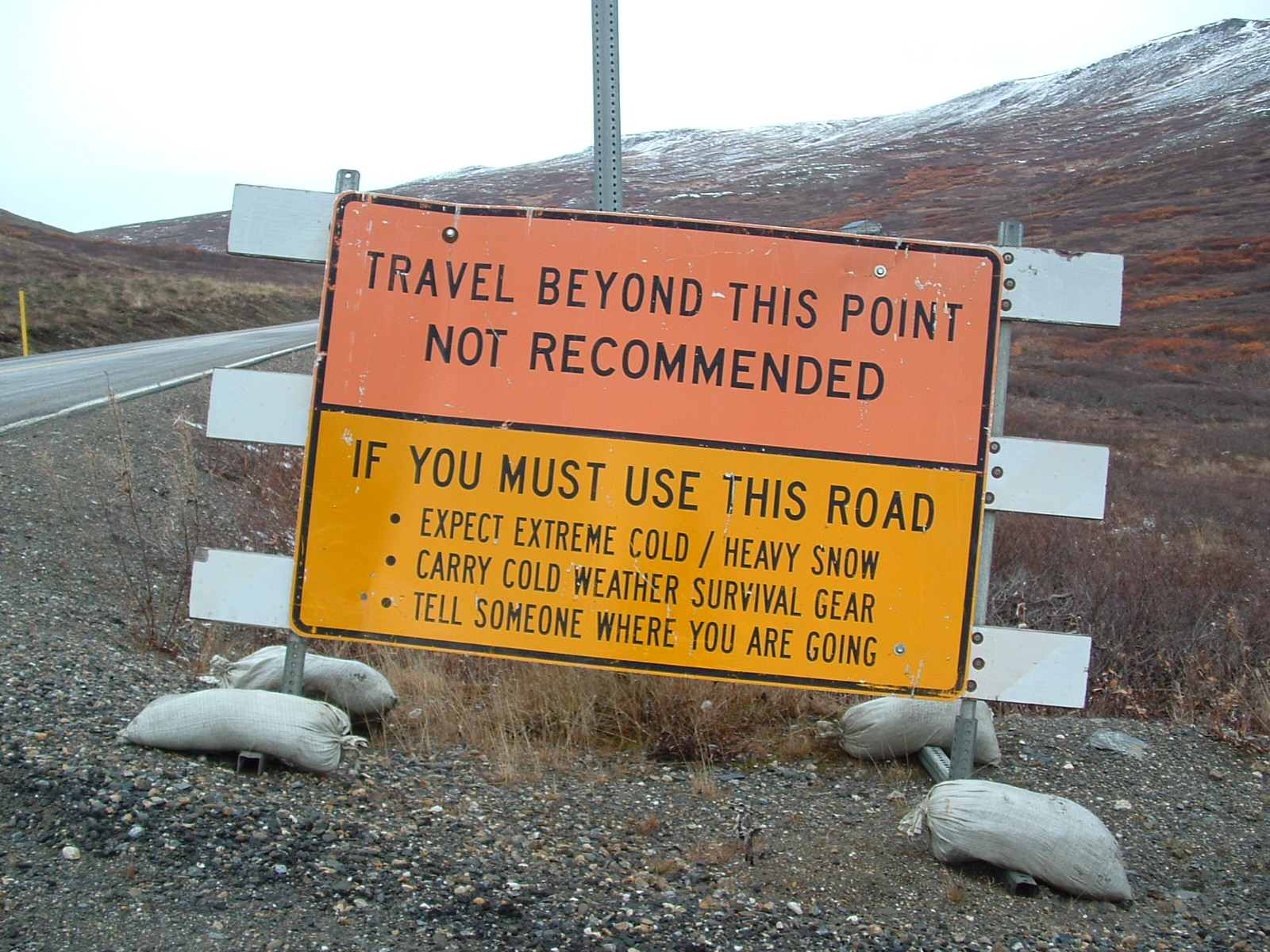
The road system leading from Nome is extensive, though sparsely used during the winter months and leads mostly through remote terrain.

Local roads lead to Council, the Kougarok River, and Teller: the Nome-Council, Nome-Taylor, and Nome-Teller Highways, respectively. There are smaller roads to communities up to 87 miles (140 km) from Nome, yet no road connection to the other major cities of Alaska.

There are no railroads going to or from Nome. A 500-mile (800 km) road project (Manley Hot Springs–Nome) is being discussed in Alaska. It has been estimated, as of 2010, to cost $2.3 to $2.7 billion, or approximately $5 million per mile.

== Healthcare ==
Local hospitals and medical centers include Norton Sound Regional Hospital and Nome Health Center. The hospital is a qualified acute care facility and medevac service. Long-term care is provided by Quyaana Care Center, a unit of the hospital.

Specialized care is available through facilities such as Norton Sound Community Mental Health Center, Turning Point – Saquigvik (transitional living), and XYZ Senior Center.

Nome is classified as a large town/Regional Center. Nome is in EMS Region 5A in the Norton Sound Region. Emergency Services have limited highway, coastal and airport access. Emergency service is provided by the 911 Telephone Service and by the Nome Volunteer Ambulance Dept.

== In popular culture ==
The reality television series Bering Sea Gold is set and filmed in Nome.

Nome is referenced in the songs "Marry the Man Today" from the 1950 Frank Loesser/Jo Swerling/Abe Burrows musical Guys and Dolls; in "A Little Brains, A Little Talent" from the 1955 Richard Adler and Jerry Ross musical Damn Yankees; “Ah, Paree!" from Stephen Sondheim's 1971 musical Follies, and the song “Roll the Bones” by the Canadian band Rush from the 1992 album of the same name.

Johnny Horton wrote the theme song "North to Alaska" for the film of the same name starring John Wayne. Nome is mentioned twice in the lyrics.

When Karen tries to buy the titular character a train ticket to the North Pole in the 1969 Rankin/Bass Christmas special Frosty the Snowman, Nome is mentioned by the ticket agent as one of many destinations for a northbound train.

In episode 1 of the 1997 BBC television travel series Full Circle, British actor, comedian, writer and presenter Michael Palin (of Monty Python fame) traveled to Nome and met a goldpanner on the "Golden Sands of Nome".

In The Simpsons Movie, the eponymous family move to Alaska, and Marge is shown knitting a quilt that reads, "Nome sweet Nome."

In the video game Rainbow Six Extraction, Nome appears as one of 12 playable locations.

The Great Alaskan Race is a movie (2019) about a group of brave mushers travel over 1100 km to save the small children of Nome, from a deadly epidemic.

Payne Lindsay hosted a season of hit podcast Up and Vanished in Nome.

=== Films set in Nome ===
- The Spoilers (1930)
- The Spoilers (1942)
- North to Alaska (1960)
- Balto (1995)
- Balto II: Wolf Quest (2002)
- Balto III: Wings of Change (2004)
- The Fourth Kind (2009)
- Snow Dogs (2002)
- Togo (2019)

== Notable people ==
- Frank E. Kleinschmidt (1871–1949), Arctic explorer, documentary film maker and film correspondent in World War I, lived in Nome with his family around 1905
- Carrie M. McLain (1895–1973), Nome-based writer and teacher.
- Donny Olson (born 1953), represents Nome and surrounding area in the Alaska State Senate
- Neal Foster (born 1972), represents Nome and surrounding area in the Alaska House of Representatives
- James "Jimmy" Doolittle (1896–1993), U.S. Air Force General, spent part of his youth living in Nome
- Dean Phillip Carter (born 1955), convicted spree killer, born in Nome, Alaska

== See also ==
- Eliot Staples Bering Sea Ice Golf Classic, an annual snow golf competition in the city
- Nome mining district
