= Nome City Field =

- IATA: none; ICAO: none; FAA LID: 94Z

Summary
- Airport type: Public
- Owner: Alaska DOT&PF
- Serves: Nome, Alaska
- Elevation AMSL: 59 ft / 18 m
- Coordinates: 64.51015°N 165.39301°W

Map
- Location of airport in Alaska

Runways
Direction	Length		Surface
Direction	ft	m	Surface
3/21	1,950	594	Gravel

Statistics (2008)
- Based aircraft: 31
- Source: Federal Aviation Administration

Nome City Field (FAA LID: 94Z) is a state-owned public-use airport located one nautical mile (1.85 km) north of the central business district of Nome, a city in the Nome Census Area of the U.S. state of Alaska.

== Facilities and aircraft ==
Nome City Field has one runway designated 3/21 with a gravel surface measuring 1,950 by 110 feet (594 x 34 m). There are 31 aircraft based at this airport: 30 single-engine and 1 ultralight.

== See also ==
- List of airports in Alaska
