= Jafet Lindeberg =

Gold prospector and co-founder of the city of Nome, Alaska

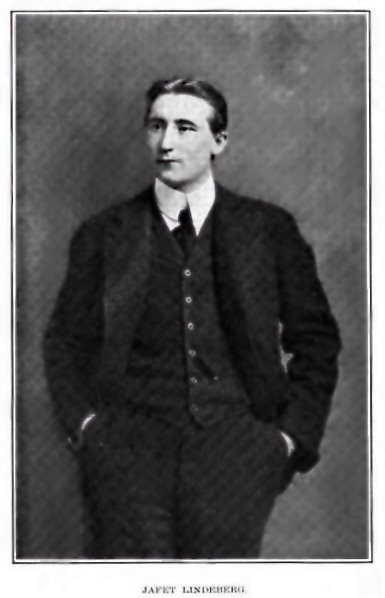
- 1905 photo
- Born: September 12, 1874; Kvænangen, Norway
- Died: November 5, 1962 (aged 88); San Francisco, California
- Occupation: Gold Prospector
- Known for: Co-founding Nome, Alaska

Jafet Lindeberg (September 12, 1874 – November 5, 1962) was a gold prospector and co-founder of the city of Nome, Alaska.

== Background ==
Jafet Isaksen Lindeberg was born in Kvænangen Municipality in Troms county in Norway. In his youth, he tried prospecting for gold in northern Norway. Lindeberg's father, Isak, was a farmer and fisherman. He had come to the region from the valley of Norrbotten, an ancient iron mining region in Norrbotten County, Sweden.

== Nome Gold Rush ==
In the autumn of 1897, the U.S. Congress decided to send help to the gold miners in Klondike. The gold rush had escalated. Thousands of people rallied to the area, most of them completely unfamiliar with the harsh climate. The authorities feared a humanitarian disaster, with famine, epidemics and lawless conditions. It was difficult to send supplies.

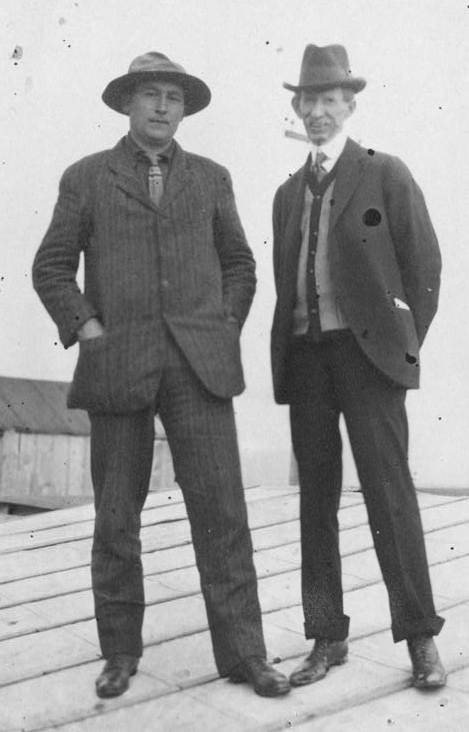
Jafet Lindeberg with photographer, Frank G. Carpenter.

It was therefore decided that reindeer and able keepers were to be shipped from Norway to Klondike. Reindeer were known as versatile animals, that could be used for food, clothing and transport. On February 4, 1898, Lindeberg left the port of Alta on the ship SS Manitoba, heading for New York City. He had been hired as a reindeer keeper. There were 113 people, 535 reindeer, and 250 tons of reindeer lichen on the ship. Upon arriving, he learned that the crisis was not as big as anticipated, and he was freed from his contract.

== The Three Lucky Swedes ==
On the Seward Peninsula at the Bering Strait he met the Swedish immigrants Erik Lindblom and John Brynteson. The three formed the mining firm, Pioneer Mining Company. Lindeberg was elected president of the new venture. The three partners also founded the city of Nome, where they later made a big find of gold. The rumors about "The Three Lucky Swedes" spread quickly. The following year, Nome experienced a gold rush similar to the Klondike rush. In 1899, Lindeberg joined in the development of Moonlight Springs which was founded by James M. Davidson (1853-1928) to supply water to the City of Nome.

Late-comers tried to "jump" the claims of the Pioneer Mining Company by filing mining claims over the same ground. A federal judge ruled that the Pioneer Mining Company claims were valid, but some of the claim jumpers gave partial interests in their claims to Washington politicians, including Alexander McKenzie, who engineered the naming of their own federal judge in the District of Alaska, Arthur Noyes (1854-1915). Noyes handed the Pioneer claims over to the claim jumpers. William W. Morrow, United States District Judge for the Northern District of California on the Ninth Circuit Court of Appeals in San Francisco, subsequently reversed Noyes' rulings, and ordered the gold mines restored to their rightful owners. After Noyes left Nome in disgrace, Lindeberg joined a group of masked vigilantes to seize their properties back from the claim jumpers.

The claim-jumping incident was the basis for Rex Beach's best-selling novel The Spoilers (1906), which was made into a stage play and five times into movies. Jafet Lindeberg lived long enough to see the character based on himself played on the big screen by John Wayne, although Lindeberg modestly said that he didn't see much resemblance between himself and Wayne's character in The Spoilers.

Lindeberg sold out his share in the Pioneer Mining Company to Wendell P. Hammon (1854-1938) in the 1920s. During a subsequent visit to Norway, Lindeberg convinced his old friend Leonhard Seppala to come work for him in America. Seppala later became a renowned musher, a hero of the 1925 serum run to Nome, and the foremost breeder of Siberian Husky of his time. Lindeberg was married to Josephine Elizabeth Metson (1874-1965), sister of William Henry Metson, attorney for Pioneer Mining. Lindeberg died in San Francisco, California in 1962.

== Legacy ==
- A statue of Jafet Lindeberg, together with Erik Lindblom and John Brynteson stands in Nome, Alaska.
- Jafet Lindeberg, Erik Lindblom and John Brynteson are all listed in the Alaskan Mining Hall of Fame
- Norwegian County Road 362 is named Jafet Lindebergs vei (Jafet Lindeberg Road) after Lindeberg

== See also ==
- Nome mining district

== Additional Sources ==
- Plazak, Dan A Hole in the Ground with a Liar at the Top (Salt Lake City: University of Utah Press, 2006)
- Harrison, Edward Sanford Nome and Seward Peninsula ( E.S. Harrison. 1905)
