= John Brynteson =

Swedish-American gold prospector

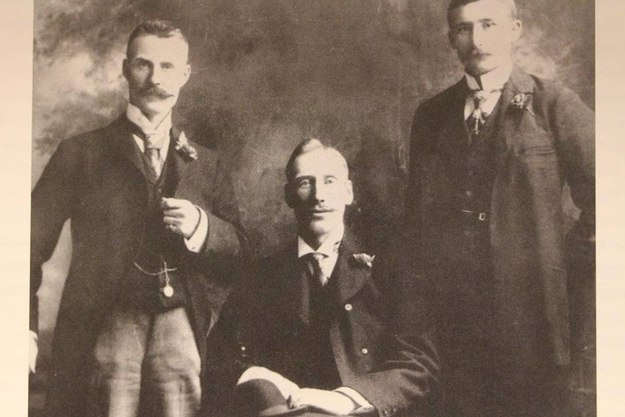
- John Brynteson seated in middle
- Born: Johan Bryntesson; August 13, 1871; Ärtemark, Dalsland, Sweden
- Died: December 17, 1959 (aged 88); Svaneholm, Säffle kommun, Sweden
- Occupation: Gold Prospector
- Known for: Co-founding Nome, Alaska
- Spouse: Emilia Amanda Forsberg (m. 1900; died 1934)

John Brynteson (August 13, 1871 – December 17, 1959) was one of the "Three Lucky Swedes" who founded and developed the Nome mining district.

Johan Bryntesson was born in the parish of Ärtemark in the traditional province of Dalsland, Sweden.

== Career ==
A gold-seeking venture which commenced in mid-September 1898 with Erik O. Lindblom and Jafet Lindeberg proved quite successful. In 1898, the three formed the Pioneer Mining and Ditch Company. The company was the largest mining company operating in Nome, Alaska, in the years following the discovery of gold. Brynteson purchased a farm in Santa Clara County, California later known as The Pruneyard.

== Personal life ==
Brynteson married Emma Forsberg on May 2, 1900 in San Francisco. The Bryntesons had three children. Brynteson died in Svaneholm, Säffle kommun, Sweden in 1959.

== Legacy ==
- A statue of John Brynteson, together with Erik Lindblom and Jafet Lindeberg stands in Nome, Alaska.
- Jafet Lindeberg, Erik Lindblom and John Brynteson are all listed in the Alaskan Mining Hall of Fame.

== Primary sources ==
- Harrison, Edward Sanford, Nome and Seward Peninsula: a book of information about northwestern Alaska (E.S. Harrison. 1905)
- Carlson, Leland H., Swedish Pioneers & the Discovery of Gold in Alaska(American Swedish Historical Museum: Yearbook. 1948)
- Olsson, Siv, Torparsonen som blev Guldkung (Dalslands Fornminnes- och Hembygdsförbund. 1989) Swedish
