= Nome mining district =

Unincorporated mining district

Cape Nome mining district
- unincorporated mining district
- Location within Alaska
- Coordinates: 64°34′N 165°20′W

The Nome mining district, also known as the Cape Nome mining district, is a gold mining district in the U.S. state of Alaska. It was discovered in 1898 when Erik Lindblom, Jafet Lindeberg and John Brynteson, the "Three Lucky Swedes", found placer gold deposits on Anvil Creek and on the Snake River few miles from the future site of Nome. Word of the strike caused a major gold rush to Nome in the spring of 1899.

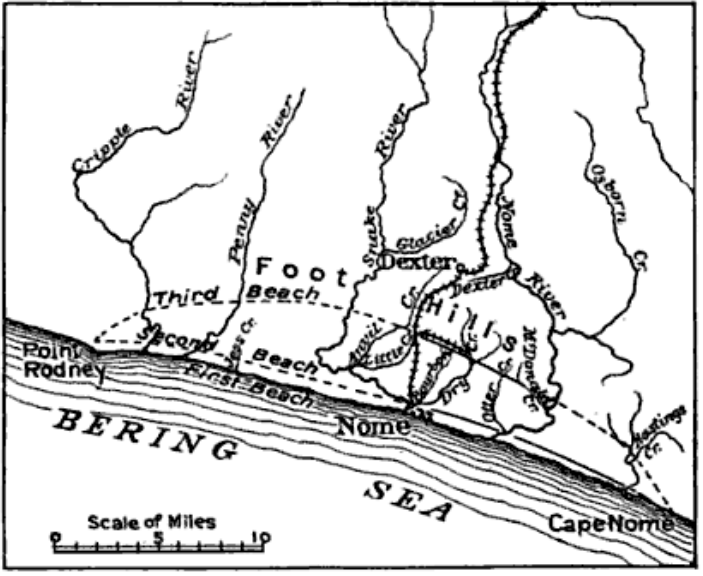
Sketch map of the Nome Beach deposits and area creeks 1908

This was one of the first and was the biggest Alaskan gold rush in North America, only the California and Klondike gold rushes were larger. A chaotic and lawless scene ensued, with rampant claim-jumping, crooked judges, and not enough gold found for the 20,000 prospectors, gamblers, shop and saloon-keepers, and prostitutes living in the tent city on the beachfront tundra, at least not at first. Then someone thought to pan the red-and-black streaked beach sands. Within days, gold was found for tens of miles up and down the beach from Nome. More than a million dollars' worth of gold was taken from the beach in 1899. Subsequently the second and third beach lines were discovered and mined. Anvil Creek produced the second-largest gold nugget found in Alaska (182 troy ounces), as well as the 6th, 7th, 9th, and 10th-largest.

Except while prohibited by law during WWII, placer mining near Nome has continued to this day. Over 3.6 million troy ounces of gold have been recovered from the creeks of the Nome District.

A myriad of small hard-rock gold deposits were exploited near Nome, but production was very small, compared to the placer deposits, and none of the hard rock mines operated for more than a few years.

In 1908, the Alaska Road Commission began constructing a trail from Seward to Nome, and in 1911, one year after the trail was completed, thousands of prospectors mushed or hiked to the Iditarod gold fields, a population boom that helped lead to Alaska becoming a territory. That trail is known as the Iditarod Trail, and is about 900 miles long.

== Rock Creek mine ==
A new hardrock gold mine, Rock Creek, has been built. Start-up procedures began in September 2008. Production efforts were suspended in November, due to design inadequacies in the mill and complications meeting regulatory requirements. NovaGold's Rock Creek project has two planned components; the Rock Creek mine and mill complex seven miles north of Nome and the historic underground Big Hurrah mine site 42 miles east. Both sites are on the road net. The gold deposit at Rock Creek consists of sheeted gold and sulfide-bearing quartz veins in metamorphosed and deformed pelitic sediments. A placer gold deposit exploited in the early and late 1900s overlies the hardrock deposit. Early miners sunk workings to explore for hardrock gold, but did not find the large and high-grade gold-in-quartz veins necessary to be economic at that time. A prescient USGS geologist in 1908 identified the cluster of small veins as essentially a "large low grade gold deposit". Underlying land is patented land owned by NovaGold and by the Sitnasauk Native village (surface) and Bering Sea regional (subsurface) Alaska Native Corporations.

Plans include additional ore from the Big Hurrah mine, 42 miles west in the Solomon River watershed, to be trucked to the mill at Rock Creek. Big Hurrah originally opened in 1908, an underground mine exploiting large quartz veins cutting black slates. The mine closed after only a few years; it was reopened for a few years in the 1950s and again in the 1970s. Big Hurrah was the largest underground mine on the Seward Peninsula.

Both sites will be mined from open pits and ore recovery will use a combination of gravity methods and vat cyanide leach procedures. Rock Creek and Big Hurrah have combined probable reserves of 510,000 ounces of gold, with 32,000 additional indicated and inferred ounces of gold. Ore grade is about 1.75 g/t gold (0.05 ounces per ton gold).

== See also ==
- Gold mining in Alaska
